= Berkshire Fencible Cavalry =

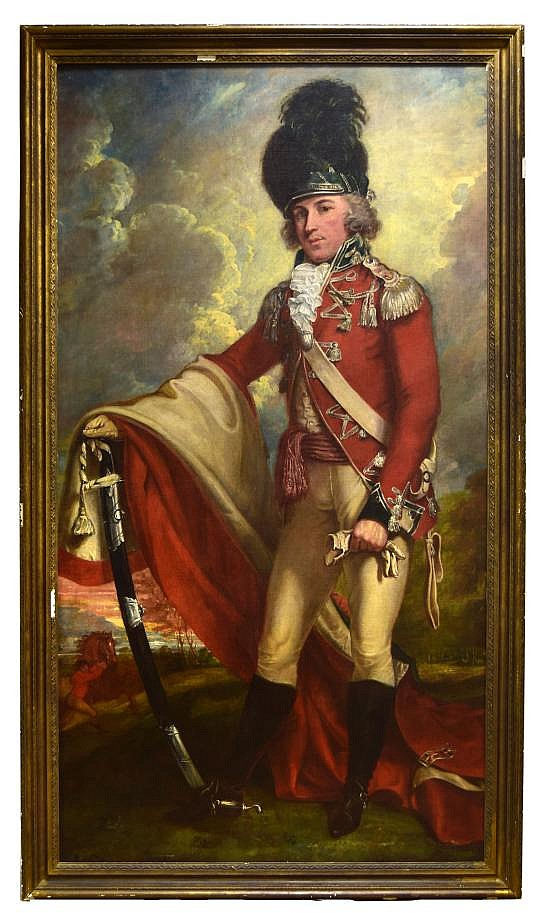
- Portrait of a Berkshire Fencible Cavalry officer
- Active: 1 May 1794 – 4 June 1800
- Country: Great Britain
- Branch: Fencibles
- Type: Light cavalry
- Size: 6 troops
- Garrison/HQ: Newbury, Berkshire
- Nickname: Windsor Foresters

The Berkshire Fencible Cavalry, popularly known as the Windsor Foresters, was a British fencible cavalry regiment raised in 1794 in the English country of Berkshire during the French Revolutionary Wars. It served in Lincolnshire and Scotland on coastal defence and anti-smuggling duties for the duration of the regiment's existence. In 1799, the Berkshire Provisional Cavalry, the county contingent of the Provisional Cavalry, was converted into a fencible cavalry regiment. Both regiments were disbanded in 1800, with several former members of the units transferring to a newly raised Yeomanry Cavalry troop at Wargrave.

== Windsor Foresters ==
Fencible regiments were full-time troops, raised to serve in any part of Great Britain and Ireland for the duration of a war, releasing Regular Army units for overseas service. A large number were raised in 1794 during the French Revolutionary War. The Windsor Foresters or Berkshire Fencible Cavalry (Note: The 1797 list of fencible officers only uses the less formal title of Windsor Foresters. It also indicates that the regiment was fifth in seniority among fencible cavalry.) were raised in Berkshire by Charles Rooke, who was appointed colonel on 1 May 1794, with Sir Nathaniel Dukinfield, Bt, as lieutenant-colonel. The regiment consisted of six Troops. Among the captains was Moses Ximenes of Bear Place, at Hare Hatch near Wargrave, whose younger brother David Ximenes, a half-pay captain in the Regular Army, was commissioned into the Foresters as a lieutenant in January 1795.

=== Service ===
In May 1795 the regiment was stationed in Lincolnshire with regimental headquarters (HQ) at Lincoln and detachments at Gainsborough and Newark-on-Trent. By October that year it had moved to Piers Hill Barracks, near Edinburgh in Scotland. In the summer of 1796 the regiment camped at Musselburgh, about five miles from the barracks. An eye-witness recorded that the Windsor Foresters rode bay horses and that the regiment 'appeared to us as the perfection of light dragoons'. For the winter of 1796/7 the regiment moved to barracks at Perth, and by autumn 1797 HQ was established at Aberdeen, with Troops detached to Arbroath and Montrose. The regiment concentrated for camp near Aberdeen in the summer of 1798 before breaking up in October and the Troops returning to their former stations. The regiment did not camp in the summer of 1799, but in October it moved south to Duns in Berwickshire, with one Troop detached at Dunbar. During the winter of 1799/1800 the men were scattered between Duns, Dunbar and Haddington. As well as anti-invasion duties on the coast, much of the unit's service was spent on anti-smuggling duties in support of HM Customs.

Service in the fencibles (who did not serve overseas) was popular, and the regiment succeeded in recruiting above its establishment strength. Although most of the original recruits probably came from Berkshire and the Home counties, Trooper Allen Mansfield (later a leading political activist) was enlisted at Cirencester. In August 1798 the recruiting parties were working in Birmingham in Warwickshire, Rugeley in Staffordshire and Glasgow in Scotland.

When it was proposed that the Berkshire Fencible Cavalry should volunteer for service in Ireland (as some of the Militia infantry regiments began to do in 1798) the officers objected strongly to being treated like professional soldiers, 'being pressed to extend or services beyond our abilities or inclinations by adopting a line of life which ought to have commenced at an earlier period when we might have secured an interest in the Profession if such had been our object'.

In mid-1798 the existing fencible cavalry regiments were numbered, the Berkshire becoming the 5th Regiment of Fencible Cavalry. Later the Berkshire Provisional Cavalry (see below) took over the title of Berkshire Fencible Cavalry.

In March 1800 the fencible cavalry were disbanded. The 5th Regiment sold off its horses and the men were progressively discharged, some of them re-enlisting with Regular units, especially the 12th Light Dragoons at Maidstone. By May, Regimental HQ and the cadres of the Troops were at Berwick-upon-Tweed, moving via Leeds to Warwick, where the regiment completed its disbandment on 4 June.

== Berkshire Provisional Cavalry ==
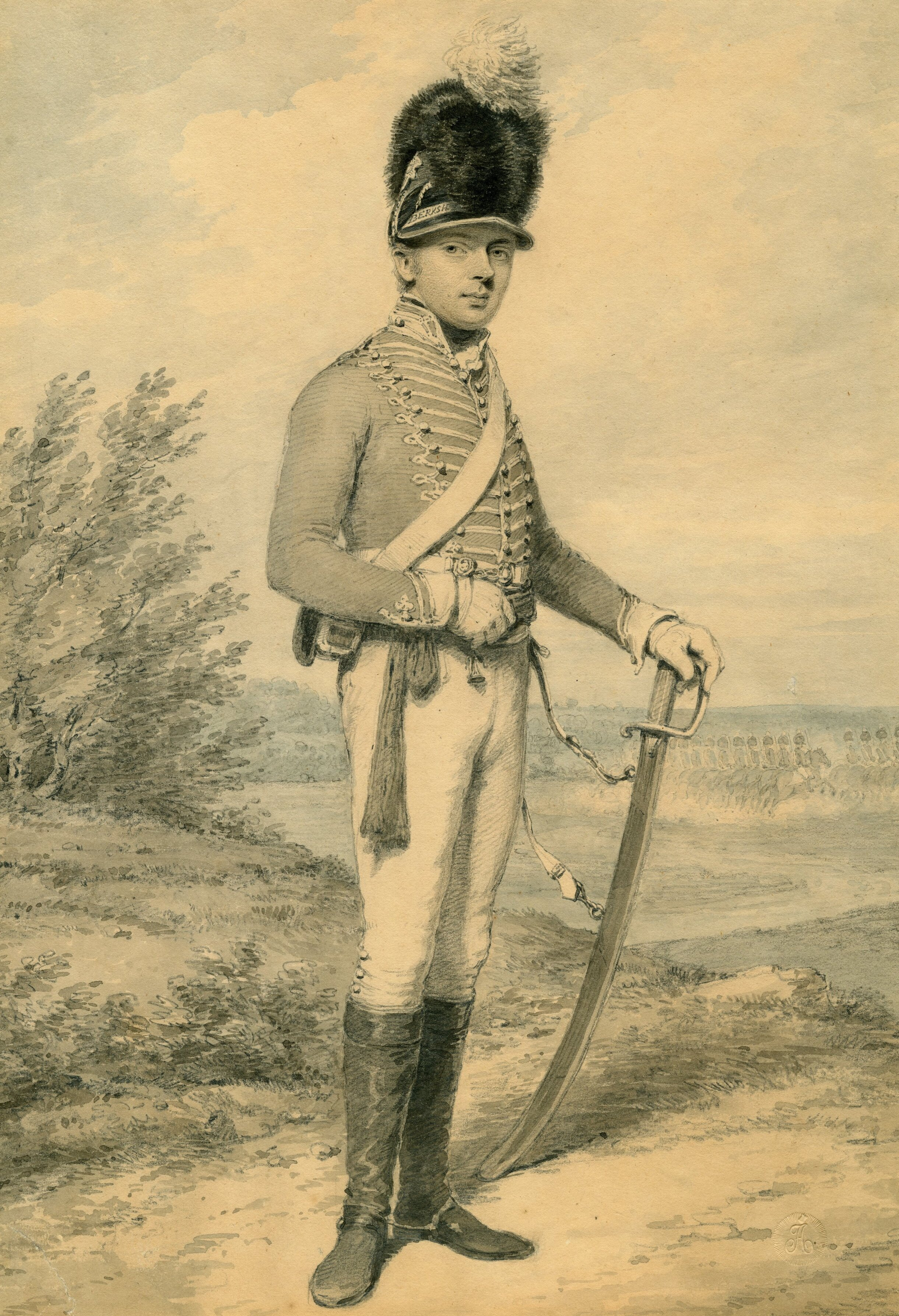
1800 portrait of a Berkshire Provisional Cavalry major

In November 1796 legislation was passed to create another body of home defence cavalry known as Provisional Cavalry. Like the Militia, these were raised by ballot if insufficient volunteers came forward, and were considered socially inferior by the Yeomanry and Volunteers. The Berkshire Provisional Cavalry was raised on 17 January 1797 under the command of Lt-Col the Hon Charles Dundas, with six Troops:

- N Troop at Newbury
- O Troop at Oakingham
- A Troop at Abingdon
- M Troop at Maidenhead
- F Troop at Faringdon
- R Troop at Reading

(Other sources give the Troop HQs as Abingdon, Hungerford, Maidenhead, Newbury, Reading and Thatcham.)

The regiment was embodied for full-time service at Newbury in August 1798 on the orders of the Earl of Radnor as Lord Lieutenant of Berkshire and Colonel of the Royal Berkshire Militia. It marched to Bristol under the second-in-command, Major F.S. Stead, and later served at Trowbridge in Wiltshire. In August 1799 the provisional cavalry were placed on the same footing as the fencible cavalry and the regiment's designation was confusingly changed to Berkshire Fencible Cavalry (the original unit now being the 5th Fencible Cavalry, see above). The former provisional cavalry regiments were disbanded in March 1800, at which time part of the Berkshire unit was at Monmouth and part at Reading. On disbandment, Lt-Col Dundas, Maj Stead and some other officers were granted commissions in the Berkshire Yeomanry.

== Wargrave Rangers ==
Wargrave Rangers
- Active: 1800–1814
- Country: United Kingdom
- Branch: Yeomanry
- Role: Light cavalry
- Size: 1 Troops
- Garrison/HQ: Wargrave, Berkshire

Commanders
- Notable commanders: Sir Morris Ximenes

When the Windsor Foresters were disbanded, Capt Moses Ximenes sought permission to raise a 'Troop of Gentlemen Cavalry' (Yeomanry) in Berkshire. He offered to pay for its clothing and kit if the arms and accoutrements of the disbanded Windsor Foresters were transferred to it. Royal permission was granted through the Lord-Lieutenant and the Wargrave Rangers was formed, with Ximenes as captain. All the Yeomanry were stood down at the Treaty of Amiens, but when war was resumed in 1803 the Wargrave Rangers were reactivated and the officers received new commissions in April. (Note: Captain David Ximenes returned to full-pay service in the 29th Foot, and his brother Morris raised sufficient recruits for him to obtain promotion to major. Sir David Ximenes went on to a distinguished military career, dying as a Lieutenant-General in 1848.) In August Ximenes offered to raise and pay for a corps of volunteer infantry to be attached to the Troop, with wagons to travel in. It is not known if this proposal was taken up.

Sir Morris Ximenes (as he had now become) retired from command of the Wargrave Rangers in March 1809 when he was appointed to a lieutenant-colonelcy in the 2nd Berkshire Local Militia, and Lieutenant William Soundby was promoted to succeed him. In late 1813, with the war drawing to a close, the independent Troops of Gentlemen Cavalry in Berkshire were invited to amalgamate with the 1st Berkshire Cavalry and the Wargrave Rangers was disbanded early in 1814, the officers having retired. However, the 1st Berkshire Cavalry (commanded by Lt-Col Dundas) maintained a Troop at Wargrave from 1817 to 1820, after which it may have joined the new Eastern Berkshire Cavalry.

== Uniforms and insignia ==
The style of uniform of the Windsor Foresters followed that of the Light Dragoons in the Regular Army, but with a red coat instead of blue; the facings were dark blue and the officers' lace silver. The waistcoat and pantaloons were white. The headdress was a Tarleton helmet with black crest and plume, and the title 'WINDSOR FORESTERS' on the scroll. The officers' sword closely resembled the Pattern 1796 light cavalry sabre, but with a plain white sword knot instead of the gold lace with scarlet stripe of the Regulars. The sword was carried in a black leather scabbard with steel mounts. Officers also wore a red cloak with white lining and dark blue cape, which was fastened with a silver metal clasp.

The uniform of the Berkshire Provisional Cavalry was a green jacket with red facings and white cords, with green pantaloons. A waistcoat was also worn. The cap was leather with a feather. The regimental guidon was of scarlet silk, with a crown, rose and thistle in the centre and 'Dieu et mon Droit' beneath. In the 1st and 4th corners was the White Horse of Hanover, in the 2nd and 3rd was the lettering 'Berks. Prov. Y.C.' with a rose and thistle wreath on a green ground.

The Wargrave Rangers wore a blue coat faced red with white lace or cords, conforming to the other Troops of Yeomanry Cavalry in Berkshire.

== See also ==
- List of British fencible regiments
- Berkshire Yeomanry

== External Sources ==
- The Napoleon Series
