= Berkshire Yeomanry =

- Badge of the Berkshire Yeomanry
- Active: 20 April 1794 – April 1828; 12 February 1831 – present
- Country: Kingdom of Great Britain (1794–1800); United Kingdom (1801–present)
- Branch: British Army
- Type: Yeomanry Cavalry (to 1921); Artillery (1921–61); Armoured reconnaissance (1961–67); Signals (1969–present)
- Role: Combat Support Signals
- Size: Three Regiments (First World War); One Regiment (Second World War); One Squadron (current)
- Part of: 39 (Skinners) Signal Regiment
- Garrison/HQ: Windsor
- Engagements: Second Boer War: Battle of Boshof; First World War: Gallipoli 1915; Egypt 1915–17; Palestine 1917–18; France and Flanders 1918; Second World War

Commanders
- Honorary Colonel: Brigadier Hugh J. Robertson, QVRM, TD, VR
- Notable commanders: Br.-Gen. John Tyson Wigan

The Berkshire Yeomanry was a part time regiment of the British Army formed in 1794 to counter the threat of invasion during the French Revolutionary Wars. It was the Royal County of Berkshire's senior volunteer unit with over 200 years of voluntary military service. After taking part in the Second Boer War, it saw action as mounted troops in the First World War and as artillery (145th (Berkshire Yeomanry) Field Regiment, Royal Artillery) in the Second World War. Its lineage is maintained by 94 (Berkshire Yeomanry) Signal Squadron, part of 39 (Skinners) Signal Regiment. The Headquarters of the Squadron is based in Windsor, Berkshire. The Berkshire Yeomanry had a number of battle honours won from Europe to the Far East and Private Frederick Potts was awarded a Victoria Cross for service during the Gallipoli Campaign.

== French Revolutionary and Napoleonic Wars ==
Under threat of invasion by the French Revolutionary government from 1793, and with insufficient military forces to repulse such an attack, the British government under William Pitt the Younger decided in 1794 to increase the Militia and to form corps (Note: Corps in this context meaning either an independent troop or a number of troops under a single command.) of volunteers for the defence of the country. The mounted arm of the volunteers became known as the "Gentlemen and Yeomanry Cavalry". The first Troop raised in Berkshire was the Abingdon Yeomanry on 10 April 1794. (Note: Wallingford, Wantage, Abingdon, Faringdon, and Didcot were all historically in Berkshire until the 1974 boundary changes transferred them to Oxfordshire.) Other corps followed so that eight were in existence by the end of 1800:

- Abingdon Yeomanry, raised 10 April 1794
- Reading Cavalry, raised 3 July 1794 – probably absorbed by Woodley corps 1798
- Newbury Association Cavalry (Donnington), raised 23 April 1798
- Woodley Cavalry, raised 11 May 1798 – two troops, probably absorbing Reading corps; reduced to one troop 1799
- Thatcham Association Cavalry, raised 24 May 1798
- Hungerford Association Cavalry, raised 1 June 1798
- Maidenhead United Cavalry Association, raised June 1798
- Loyal Windsor Cavalry, raised 30 September 1800

When the Fencible and Provisional cavalry regiments (full-time home defence troops) were disbanded in 1800, Sir Morris Ximenes of Bear Place, at Hare Hatch near Wargrave, and some of his fellow officers of the Windsor Foresters (5th Fencible Cavalry) offered to raise another part-time 'Troop of Gentlemen Cavalry' in Berkshire, which became the Wargrave Rangers on 21 March 1800.

The brief Peace of Amiens in 1802 saw a number of corps disbanding, to be re-raised in 1803 with the resumption of hostilities.

- Abingdon Yeomanry, service renewed 31 August 1802
- Donnington and Newbury Cavalry, reformed 22 August 1803
- Woodley Cavalry, service renewed 8 October 1802
- Thatcham Volunteer Cavalry, reformed 24 February 1803
- Hungerford Yeomanry, reformed 30 September 1803
- Maidenhead Cavalry, reformed 13 October 1803
- Loyal Windsor Cavalry, service renewed 30 September 1802
- Wargrave Cavalry, reformed 22 March 1803
- Aldermaston Cavalry, raised 13 August 1803
- Vale of White Horse Cavalry, two troops raised 3 September 1803

Sir Morris Ximenes offered to raise and pay for an additional corps of volunteer infantry to be attached to the Wargrave troop, with wagons to travel in; it is not known if this proposal was taken up.

In 1804, five troops in the north and west of the county – Abingdon, Donnington with Newbury, Hungerford, and the Vale of White Horse (two troops) – were regimented as the Western or 1st Berkshire Cavalry under the command of Lieutenant-Colonel the Hon Charles Dundas, MP, former commanding officer of the Berkshire Provisional Cavalry. An attempt the following year to regiment the Maidenhead, Windsor, Woodley (including Reading) and Wargrave troops was unsuccessful. The Aldermaston, Thatcham and Windsor Troops were disbanded in 1807, followed by the Maidenhead in 1809.

In late 1813, with the war drawing to a close, the remaining independent troops were invited to amalgamate with the 1st Berkshire Cavalry; the Woodley Troop joined while the Wargrave Rangers disbanded early in 1814, the officers having retired. However, the 1st Berkshire Cavalry maintained a troop at Wargrave from 1817 to 1820, after which the Woodley and Wargrave troops joined the Eastern Berkshire Yeomanry Cavalry raised on 14 January 1820 by Major Payn of the new Maidenhead Troop.

== 19th Century ==
After the Battle of Waterloo the Yeomanry were kept in being in 'for Military Service in aid of the Civil Power' in the absence of organised police forces, case of civil disorder. Government support for the Yeomanry was withdrawn in 1828 and many corps were disbanded; the 1st Berkshire Regiment was disbanded in January 1828 and the Eastern Regiment in April.

However, just two years later a wave of unrest swept the country and the government restored Yeomanry pay for drills and periods of service in aid of the civil power. Four independent troops of yeomanry were re-formed in Berkshire in 1831:

- Hungerford
- Newbury with Welford Park
- Vale of White Horse
- Woolley

These had dwindled to just the Hungerford Troop by 1838. This was increased to two troops by 1852, three in 1853 and four by 1874. About 1847 the unit adopted the title of Royal Berkshire Yeomanry Cavalry; although there is no evidence of official permission for the 'Royal' title, it remained in use until 1902. The official title was Berkshire Regiment of Yeomanry Cavalry (Hungerford). On 1 April 1893, the troops were reorganised into two squadrons.

Following the Cardwell Reforms a mobilisation scheme began to appear in the Army List from December 1875. This assigned Regular and Yeomanry units places in an order of battle of corps, divisions and brigades for the 'Active Army', even though these formations were entirely theoretical, with no staff appointed. The Berkshire Yeomanry were assigned as 'divisional troops' to 1st Division of II Corps based at Aldershot, alongside Regular units of infantry, artillery and engineers. This was never more than a paper organisation, but by 1899 the Berkshire Yeomanry together with the Middlesex Yeomanry formed the 1st Yeomanry Brigade. In the 1890s the regimental headquarters (RHQ) moved from Hungerford to Reading.

== Imperial Yeomanry ==
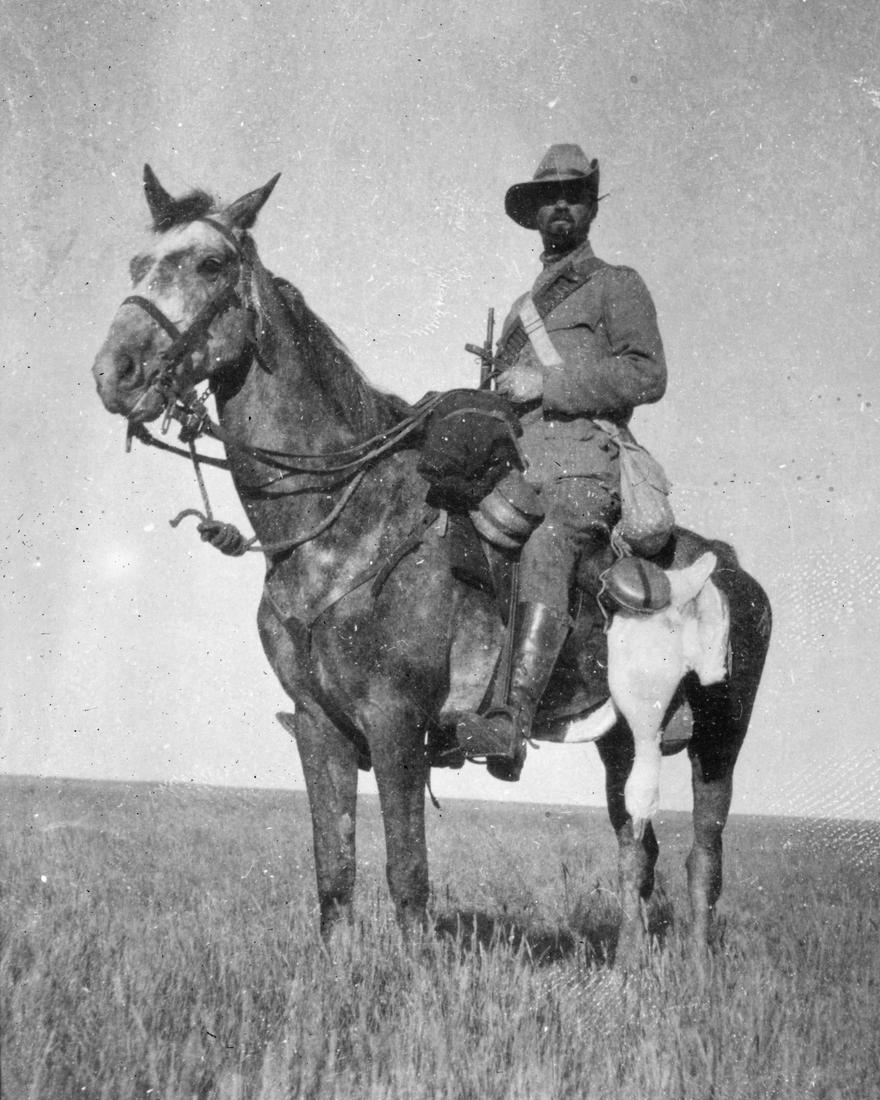
Imperial yeoman on the Veldt.

Following a string of defeats during Black Week in early December 1899, the British government realised that it would need more troops than just the regular army to fight the Second Boer War. On 13 December, the decision to allow volunteer forces to serve in South Africa was made, and a Royal Warrant was issued on 24 December. This officially created the Imperial Yeomanry (IY). The force was organised as county service companies of approximately 115 men signed up for one year, and volunteers from the Yeomanry and civilians (usually middle and upper class) quickly filled the new force, which was equipped to operate as Mounted infantry. Although there were strict requirements, many volunteers were accepted with substandard horsemanship or marksmanship and had little time to train before arriving in South Africa. The first contingent of recruits contained 550 officers, 10,371 men in 20 battalions of 4 companies, which arrived in South Africa between February and April 1900.

The Berkshire Yeomanry raised the 39th and 58th (Berkshire) Companies, which landed in South Africa on 28 February and 4 April 1900 and served in 10th and 15th Battalions, IY, respectively, alongside Buckinghamshire and Oxfordshire companies (10th Battalion was commanded by Lord Chesham of the Buckinghamshire Yeomanry). Upon arrival, the battalions were sent throughout the zone of operations.

Chesham's 10th Battalion IY was attached to 1st Division under the command of Lord Methuen and Chesham became Brigadier-General of the division's mounted troops. On 5 April Methuen learned of the presence of a small Boer Commando led by the French Comte de Villebois-Mareuil and ordered Chesham's IY and other mounted troops to saddle up at once. The force caught the commando, pinned it with a few rounds of artillery fire, and then advanced by small rushes on both flanks, the IY taking the left flank. De Villebois-Mareuil was killed and his men surrendered. The Battle of Boshof was the first action for the new IY, but with little field training, only a brief musketry course, and few officers, they 'acted like veteran troops'. Methuen was 'much struck by the intelligent manner in which they carried out the attack and made use of cover'.

By May 1900 both the 10th and 15th Battalions IY were serving in Methuen's Column, which quickly became known as the 'Mobile Marvels'. On 14 May Methuen marched on Hoopstad and then continued into Orange Free State protecting the flank of Lord Roberts' main army. Methuen's column reached Bothaville on 24 May, but Roberts became concerned about his communications, so Methuen was switched to protecting the rear, and marched to Kroonstad, where the column arrived on 28 May, having completed a march of 168 miles (270 km) in 15 days over poor roads. On 30 May, Metheun was informed that the 13th (Irish) Bn IY was cut off at Lindley, and he rode with his own IY battalions to relieve them, covering 44 miles (71 km) in 24 hours. The mounted column had a five-hour fight to force its way past 3000 Boers led by Christiaan de Wet. Most of the force in Lindley had already surrendered, but the 5th and 10th Battalions IY under Lt-Col George Younghusband were able to free a number of the prisoners. Methuen then pushed on to relieve 9th Division, which was besieged at Heilbron, completing a march of 267 miles (430 km) in under a month.

Methuen's Column now took part in the pursuit of de Wet's force south down the railway towards Kroonstad, beginning with a sharp action at Rhenoster River on 24 June. The 'Great de Wet Hunt' began in earnest in August. On 6 August Methuen set out with the 5th and 10th Battalions IY, some infantry and artillery to catch the Boer commander at Scandinavia Drift, switching to Schoeman's Drift when better intelligence arrived. De Wet and half his force had got across the drift before Methuen arrived, but the rearguard was cleared and the column pressed forward. Methuen sent Chesham and the IY towards Frederikstad to cut off de Wet, but after their long march the day before the yeomanry could not keep up with the Boers.

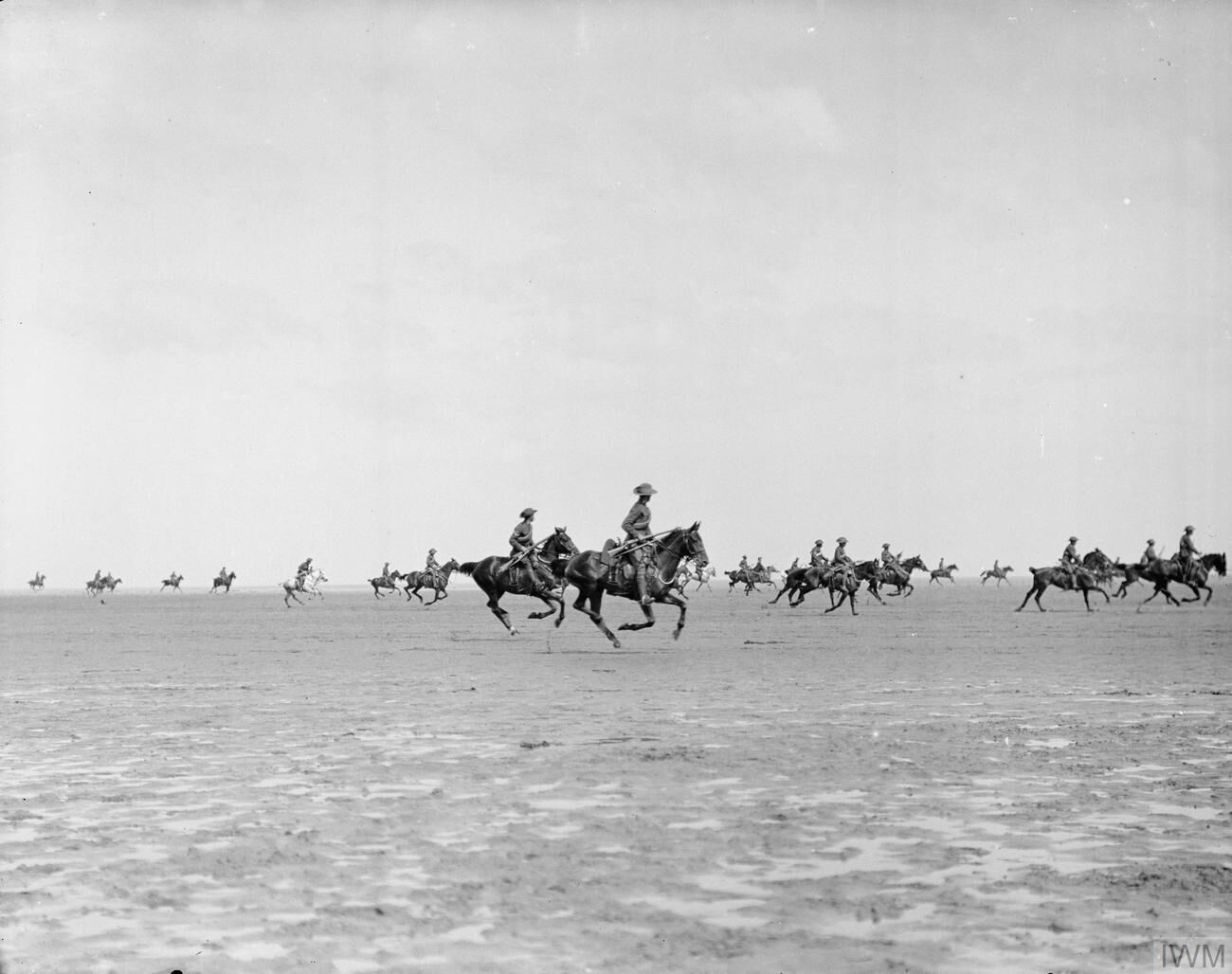
Imperial Yeomanry galloping over a plain during the Second Boer War.

The Great de Wet Hunt by numerous British columns continued through August and September, with Methuen personally leading a column including the 1st Yeomanry Brigade under Chesham. Methuen drove his force on with little rest, to Welverdiend Pass and Taaibosch Spruit, then to Frederikstad. On 12 August the column engaged the Boers at Mooi River Bridge for four hours, capturing guns and wagons and freeing British prisoners. Methuen's column had covered 150 miles (240 km) in six days, driving de Wet towards the Olifant's Nek pass, which Methuen believed was blocked by other columns. On the night of 13/14 August his troops set out to catch the Boers, engaging them at Buffelshoek about 6 miles (9.7 km) from the pass. However, the Boers escaped through the pass, which had not been blocked. With his troops exhausted, Methuen had to call off the pursuit.

Drives to catch the remaining commandos went on for almost another two years. The First Contingent of the Imperial Yeomanry completed their year's term of service in 1901 and were replaced by a Second Contingent. The two Berkshire companies, in which 600 men of all ranks of the Berkshire Yeomanry had served by the end of the war, earned the regiment its first Battle honour: South Africa 1900–01.

The Imperial Yeomanry were trained and equipped as mounted infantry. The concept was considered a success and before the war ended the existing Yeomanry regiments at home were converted into Imperial Yeomanry, with an establishment of HQ and four squadrons with a machine gun section. This included the Berkshire (Hungerford) Imperial Yeomanry (Dragoons), renamed on 17 April 1901.

== Territorial Force ==
On 1 April 1908, the regiment was renamed for the final time as the Berkshire (Hungerford) Yeomanry and transferred to the Territorial Force, trained and equipped as dragoons. Its organisation was:

	Berkshire (Hungerford) Yeomanry
HQ	Yeomanry House, Reading
A Squadron	Windsor (detachments at Maidenhead, Wokingham)
B Squadron	Reading (detachment at Wallingford)
C Squadron	Newbury (detachments at Hungerford, Lambourn)
D Squadron	Wantage (detachments at Abingdon, Faringdon, Didcot)

It was ranked as 26th (of 55) in the order of precedence of the Yeomanry Regiments in the Army List of 1914.

== First World War ==
In accordance with the Territorial and Reserve Forces Act 1907 (7 Edw. 7, c.9) which brought the Territorial Force into being, the TF was intended to be a home defence force for service during wartime and members could not be compelled to serve outside the country. However, on the outbreak of war on 4 August 1914, many members volunteered for Imperial Service. Therefore, TF units were split in August and September 1914 into 1st Line (liable for overseas service) and 2nd Line (home service for those unable or unwilling to serve overseas) units. Later, a 3rd Line was formed to act as a reserve, providing trained replacements for the 1st and 2nd Line regiments.

=== 1/1st Berkshire Yeomanry ===
The regiment was mobilized with its brigade on 4 August 1914 upon the outbreak of the First World War. Initially, it concentrated in Berkshire and on 5 August 1914 joined the 1st Mounted Division. On 2 September it was transferred to the 2nd Mounted Division and in mid November 1914 it moved with its division to Norfolk on coastal defence duties.

In April 1915, the 2nd Mounted Division moved to Egypt arriving at Alexandria between 19 and 21 April and was posted to Cairo by the middle of May. The regiment was dismounted in August 1915 and took part in the Gallipoli Campaign. It left a squadron headquarters and two troops (about 100 officers and men) in Egypt to look after the horses.

They landed at "A" Beach, Suvla Bay on 18 August and moved into bivouacs at Lala Baba on 20 August. On 21 August it advanced to Chocolate Hill via Salt Lake and Hetman Chair and took part in the attack on Scimitar Hill. Due to losses during the Battle of Scimitar Hill and wastage during August 1915, the 2nd Mounted Division had to be reorganised. On 4 September 1915, the 1st Composite Mounted Brigade was formed from the 1st (1st South Midland), 2nd (2nd South Midland) and 5th (Yeomanry) Mounted Brigades. Each brigade formed a battalion sized unit, for example, 2nd South Midland Regiment and each regiment a sub-unit. The brigade embarked for Mudros on 31 October and returned to Egypt in December 1915 where its component units were reformed and remounted.

The brigade left the 2nd Mounted Division on 17 January 1916 and was sent to the Western Frontier of Egypt as an independent formation. On 31 March 1916, the remaining Mounted Brigades were numbered in a single sequence. As a consequence, the 2nd South Midland Mounted Brigade was redesignated as 6th Mounted Brigade. The brigade served with the Western Frontier Force from January to October 1916. It joined the newly formed Imperial Mounted Division in January 1917 and took part in the First and Second Battles of Gaza.

The complete brigade was transferred to the newly formed Yeomanry Mounted Division on 27 June 1917, joining it at el Maraqeb. From 31 October it took part in the Third Battle of Gaza, including the Battle of Beersheba and the Capture of the Sheria Position. It took part in the Battle of Mughar Ridge on 13 and 14 November and the Battle of Nebi Samwil from 17 to 24 November. From 27 to 29 November, it withstood the Turkish counter-attacks during the Capture of Jerusalem.

In March 1918, the 1st Indian Cavalry Division was broken up in France. The British units (notably 6th (Inniskilling) Dragoons, 17th Lancers, 1/1st Queen's Own Yorkshire Dragoons and A, Q and U Batteries RHA) remained in France and the Indian elements were sent to Egypt. By an Egyptian Expeditionary Force GHQ Order of 12 April 1918, the mounted troops of the EEF were reorganised when the Indian Army units arrived in theatre. On 24 April 1918, the Yeomanry Mounted Division was indianized (Note: British divisions were converted to the British Indian Army standard whereby brigades only retained one British regiment or battalion and most support units were Indian (artillery excepted).) and its title was changed to 1st Mounted Division, the third distinct division to bear this title. (Note: See 1st Mounted Division and 3rd Mounted Division.) On 24 April 1918, the 6th Mounted Brigade was merged with elements of the 5th (Mhow) Cavalry Brigade: the Royal Buckinghamshire Hussars and the Berkshire Yeomanry left the brigade on 4 April and were merged to form C Battalion, Machine Gun Corps. They were replaced by 2nd Lancers (Gardner's Horse) and 38th King George's Own Central India Horse from 5th (Mhow) Cavalry Brigade.

C Battalion, MGC was posted to France, arriving on 28 June 1918. In August 1918 it was renumbered as 101st (Bucks. & Berks. Yeo.) Battalion, Machine Gun Corps. They remained on the Western Front for the rest of the war. At the Armistice, it was serving as Army Troops with the Second Army.

=== 2/1st Berkshire Yeomanry ===
The 2nd Line regiment was formed at Reading in September 1914. By March 1915 it was with 2/2nd South Midland Mounted Brigade in 2/2nd Mounted Division and was at King's Lynn in Norfolk. On 31 March 1916, the remaining Mounted Brigades were ordered to be numbered in a single sequence; the brigade was numbered as 11th Mounted Brigade and the division as 3rd Mounted Division.

In July 1916, the regiment was converted to a cyclist unit in 8th Cyclist Brigade, 2nd Cyclist Division, and was stationed in the Maidstone area of Kent. In September 1916 it moved to the Ipswich area of Suffolk. In November 1916, the division was broken up and regiment was merged with the 2/1st Hampshire Yeomanry to form 11th (Hampshire and Berkshire) Yeomanry Cyclist Regiment in 4th Cyclist Brigade. In March 1917 it resumed its identity as 2/1st Berkshire Yeomanry and by July 1917 it was at Wivenhoe. About January 1918 it went to Ireland with the 4th Cyclist Brigade and was stationed at Dublin and Dundalk until the end of the war.

=== 3/1st Berkshire Yeomanry ===
The 3rd Line regiment was formed in 1915; in the summer it was affiliated to the 7th Reserve Cavalry Regiment at Tidworth. Early in 1917 it was absorbed into the 6th Reserve Cavalry Regiment at Tidworth.

== Interwar ==
On 7 February 1920, the Regiment was reconstituted in the Territorial Army with HQ still at Reading. Following the experience of the war, it was decided that only the fourteen most senior yeomanry regiments would be retained as horsed cavalry, with the rest being transferred to other roles. As a result, on 22 June 1921, the Regiment was amalgamated with the Royal Buckinghamshire Yeomanry and simultaneously transferred to the Royal Artillery to form 99th (Buckinghamshire and Berkshire) Brigade, RFA with HQ at Aylesbury.

The two yeomanry regiments retained their own identities and badges within the amalgamated unit, with each providing two batteries. The Berkshire Yeomanry formed 395 (Berkshire Yeomanry) Battery at Reading and 396 (Berkshire Yeomanry) Battery at Newbury.

The brigade / regiment underwent a number of redesignations before the outbreak of the Second World War. In February 1922 it regained its yeomanry title as 99th (Buckinghamshire and Berkshire Yeomanry) Brigade, RFA. Another title change came in June 1924 as the Royal Field Artillery was reamalgamated back into the Royal Artillery and it became 99th (Buckinghamshire and Berkshire Yeomanry) (Army) Field Brigade, RA. The final change came in November 1938 as artillery brigades became regiments, hence 99th (Buckinghamshire and Berkshire Yeomanry) Field Regiment, RA.

== Second World War ==
By 1939, it became clear that a new European war was likely to break out, and the doubling of the Territorial Army was authorised, with each unit forming a duplicate. The Berkshire and Buckinghamshire Yeomanry were separated on 25 August 1939, with each being reconstituted as field regiments of the Royal Artillery. The Buckinghamshire contingent became 99th (Buckinghamshire Yeomanry) Field Regiment, Royal Artillery and the Berkshire contingent became 145th Field Regiment, Royal Artillery.

=== 145th Field Regiment, Royal Artillery ===
With the outbreak of war in September 1939, 145th Field Regiment, RA was mobilised at Newbury and assigned to 61st Infantry Division. Field regiments were organised in 1938 into two 12-gun batteries. The experience of the BEF in France 1940 showed the problem with this organisation: field regiments were intended to support an infantry brigade of three battalions. This could not be managed without severe disruption to the regiment. As a result, field regiments were reorganised into three 8-gun batteries. The third battery (509) was formed in the regiment at Antrim on 14 January 1941. It gained its subtitle, initially as 145th Field Regiment, RA (Buckinghamshire and Berkshire Yeomanry) (TA) from 17 February 1942, amended on 12 May 1942 to 145th Field Regiment, RA (Berkshire Yeomanry) (TA).

The regiment remained in the UK for most of the war, only moving to India in February 1945. There, it was successively assigned to 39th Indian Division at Dehra Dun, 36th British Infantry Division at Poona, 26th Indian Infantry Division at Bangalore, and 25th Indian Infantry Division at Cocanada. Post war, it moved to Malaya and Java. The regiment was placed in suspended animation in ALFSEA on 1 June 1946.

== Postwar ==
The regiment was reformed on 1 January 1947 as 345th (Berkshire Yeomanry) Medium Regiment, RA, with HQ at Newbury and a battery at Windsor. The Windsor battery was detached to form 662nd Medium Regiment, RA, which was shortly afterwards redesignated as 346th (Berkshire Yeomanry) Medium Regiment, RA. They were amalgamated on 16 August 1950 as 345th (Berkshire Yeomanry) Medium Regiment, RA. On 31 October 1956, the regiment was reduced to a single battery as R (Berkshire Yeomanry) Battery in 299th (Royal Buckinghamshire Yeomanry, Berkshire Yeomanry, and Queen's Own Oxfordshire Hussars) Field Regiment, RA.

On 1 May 1961, the battery was amalgamated with the Westminster Dragoons to form C (Berkshire Yeomanry) Squadron, Berkshire and Westminster Dragoons, RAC and converted to armoured cars. This was a short lived arrangement: on 1 April 1967 the Berkshire and Westminster Dragoons was reconstituted as two units with the Berkshire elements forming A Company (Berkshire Yeomanry), The Royal Berkshire Territorials at Windsor. At the start of 1969 it once more changed role as 94 (Berkshire Yeomanry) Squadron in 71st Signal Regiment, Royal Signals.

In 1996 the Squadron left 71 Signal Regiment and became an independent Signal Squadron tasked with providing Combat Net Radio for the Combat Service Support Group (CSSG).

The Squadron joined 31st Signal Regiment in 2003 and transferred to 39th Signal Regiment in 2006.

A second squadron was formed from C Company, 2nd Battalion, Wessex Regiment, in October 1995 as D (Berkshire Yeomanry) Squadron, Royal Yeomanry, at Slough. This was disbanded on 1 June 2000.

== Victoria Cross ==
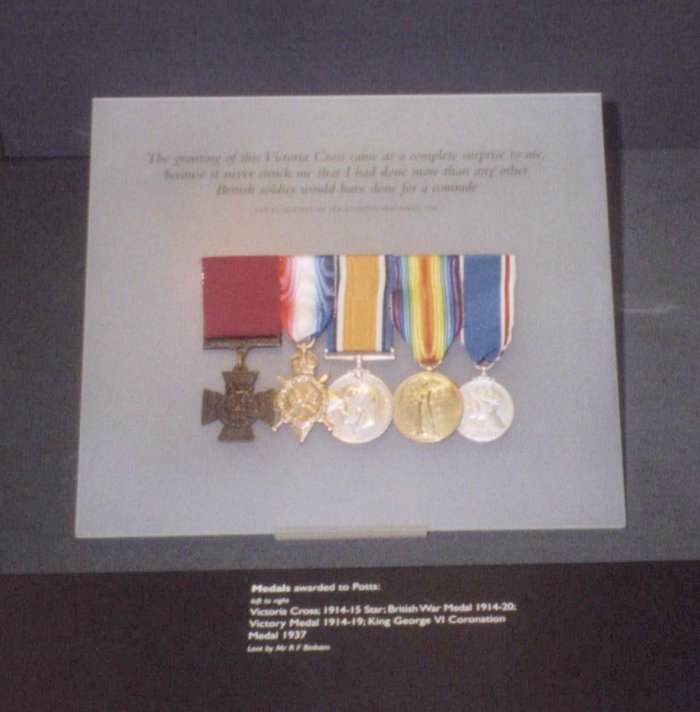
Potts' medal collection at the Imperial War Museum.

Trooper Frederick William Owen Potts, VC, 1/1st Berkshire Yeomanry, won the Victoria Cross, the highest and most prestigious award for gallantry in the face of the enemy that can be awarded to British and Commonwealth forces.

On 21 August 1915 in the attack on Hill 70, Private Potts (although wounded in the thigh) remained for over 48 hours under the Turkish trenches with another private from his regiment who was severely wounded, and unable to move. He finally fixed a shovel to the equipment of his wounded comrade and using this as a sledge, dragged the man back over 600 yards to safety, being under fire all the way.

== Present role of the squadron ==
Today the squadron is an Army Reserve squadron of the Royal Corps of Signals, serving within both of the Royal Signals UK Brigades. The squadron supports NATO's Allied Rapid Reaction Corps (ARRC), providing essential Combat Net Radio communications for the ARRC or international coalition force.

== Battle honours ==
The Berkshire Yeomanry has been awarded the following battle honours:

Second Boer War

South Africa 1900–01

First World War

Arras 1918, Scarpe 1918, Ypres 1918, Courtrai, France and Flanders 1918, Suvla, Scimitar Hill, Gallipoli 1915, Egypt 1915–17, Gaza, El Mughar, Nebi Samwil, Palestine 1917–18

Second World War

The Royal Artillery was present in nearly all battles and would have earned most of the honours awarded to cavalry and infantry regiments. In 1833, William IV awarded the motto Ubique (meaning "everywhere") in place of all battle honours.

== Badge ==
The regiment's badge features the Uffington White Horse in the Vale of White Horse, historically in Berkshire until the 1974 boundary changes when it was transferred to Oxfordshire.

== See also ==
- Imperial Yeomanry
- List of Yeomanry Regiments 1908
- Yeomanry
- Yeomanry order of precedence
- British yeomanry during the First World War
- Second line yeomanry regiments of the British Army
- List of British Army Yeomanry Regiments converted to Royal Artillery
- Royal Corps of Signals

== Bibliography ==
- L.S. Amery (ed), The Times History of the War in South Africa 1899-1902, London: Sampson Low, Marston, 6 Vols 1900–09.
- Becke, Archibald F. (1936). Order of Battle of Divisions Part 2A. The Territorial Force Mounted Divisions and the 1st-Line Territorial Force Divisions (42–56). London: HMSO. OCLC 4405016.
- Buzzell, Nora (1997). The Register of the Victoria Cross. This England. ISBN 0-906324-03-3.
- Andrew Cormack, 'Captain Moses Ximenes and the Berkshire Fencible Cavalry', Journal of the Society for Army Historical Research, Vol 97, No 389 (Summer 2019), pp. 109–19.
- Doyle, Peter; Foster, Chris (2012). British Army Cap Badges of the Second World War. Bloomsbury Publishing. ISBN 978-0-7478-1110-7.
- Col John K. Dunlop, The Development of the British Army 1899–1914, London: Methuen, 1938.
- Forty, George (1998). British Army Handbook 1939–1945. Stroud, Gloucestershire: Sutton Publishing Limited. ISBN 0-7509-1403-3.
- Frederick, J.B.M. (1984). Lineage Book of British Land Forces 1660–1978. Wakefield, Yorkshire: Microform Academic Publishers. ISBN 1-85117-009-X.
- James, Brigadier E.A. (1978). British Regiments 1914–18. London: Samson Books Limited. ISBN 0-906304-03-2.
- Kipling, Arthur L; King, Hugh L (2006). Head-Dress Badges of the British Army. Vol. 2: From the End of the Great war to the Present Day. Uckfield: Naval and Military Press. ISBN 1-84342-513-0.
- N.B. Leslie, Battle Honours of the British and Indian Armies 1695–1914, London: Leo Cooper, 1970, ISBN 0-85052-004-5.
- Cliff Lord & Graham Watson, Royal Corps of Signals: Unit Histories of the Corps (1920–2001) and its Antecedents, Solihull: Helion, 2003, ISBN 1-874622-92-2.
- Mileham, Patrick (1994). The Yeomanry Regiments; 200 Years of Tradition. Edinburgh: Canongate Academic. ISBN 1-898410-36-4.
- Stephen M. Miller, Lord Methuen and the British Army: Failure and Redemption in South Africa, London: Cass, 1999, ISBN 0-7146-4904-X.
- Perry, F.W. (1992). Order of Battle of Divisions Part 5A. The Divisions of Australia, Canada and New Zealand and those in East Africa. Newport: Ray Westlake Military Books. ISBN 1-871167-25-6.
- Perry, F.W. (1993). Order of Battle of Divisions Part 5B. Indian Army Divisions. Newport: Ray Westlake Military Books. ISBN 1-871167-23-X.
- Col H.C.B. Rogers, The Mounted Troops of the British Army 1066–1945, London: Seeley Service, 1959.
- Rinaldi, Richard A (2008). Order of Battle of the British Army 1914. Ravi Rikhye. ISBN 978-0-97760728-0.
- Snelling, Stephen (1995). VCs of the First World War: Gallipoli 1915. Stroud, Gloucestershire: Sutton Publishing Limited. ISBN 0-7509-0566-2.
- Edward M. Spiers, The Army and Society 1815–1914, London: Longmans, 1980, ISBN 0-582-48565-7.
- Maj G.Tylden, 'The Yeomanry in Berkshire', Journal of the Society for Army Historical Research, Vol 28, No 115 (Autumn 1950), p. 132.
- Westlake, Ray (1992). British Territorial Units 1914–18. Osprey Publishing. ISBN 978-1-85532-168-7.
- Westlake, Ray (1996). British Regiments at Gallipoli. Barnsley: Leo Cooper. ISBN 0-85052-511-X.
- Steve White, Strike Home: The Royal Bucks Yeomanry 1794–1967, Leicester?: Steve White, 1992, ISBN 0-95193810-X.
- Order of Battle of the British Armies in France, November 11th, 1918. France: General Staff, GHQ. 1918.
