= George Squibb =

George Squibb may refer to:

- George Drewry Squibb (1906–1994), English lawyer, herald and antiquary
- George Squibb (auctioneer) (c. 1764–1831), British auctioneer
