= Squibb =

Squibb is a surname. Notable people with the surname include:

- David Squibb (1935–2010), British conductor
- E. R. Squibb (1819–1900), American physician, inventor, and pharmaceutical company founder
- Geoff Squibb (born 1946), Australian politician
- George Drewry Squibb (1906–1994), British lawyer
- George Squibb (auctioneer) (1764–1831), British auctioneer
- Jimmy Squibb (1921–2004), English motorcycle speedway rider
- June Squibb (born 1929), American actress
- Katherine Squibb (1949–2018), American toxicologist
- Paul Squibb (fl. 1915), American college footballer
- Paul Squibb (educator) (1895–1984), American educator
- Penny Squibb (born 1993), Australian field hockey player

== See also ==
- Bristol Myers Squibb, pharmaceutical company
- Squib (disambiguation)
- Squibb Wilson (1913–1986), American football, basketball, and baseball coach
- Squibb Park, an urban elevated park in Brooklyn, New York
