= Yeomanry House =

Yeomanry Housemay refer to:

- Yeomanry House, Bloomsbury, a drill hall in Bloomsbury, London
- Yeomanry House, Buckingham, a drill hall in Buckingham
- Yeomanry House, Cupar, a drill hall in Cupar, Fife
- Yeomanry House, Hertford, a drill hall in Hertford
- Yeomanry House, Reading, a drill hall in Reading, Berkshire
