= Royal Berkshire Militia =

Auxiliary unit of the British Army

Royal Berkshire Militia 3rd (Reserve) Battalion, Royal Berkshire Regiment
- Active: 1661–1 April 1953
- Country: England 1661–1707; Kingdom of Great Britain (1707–1800); United Kingdom (1801–1953)
- Branch: Militia/Special Reserve
- Role: Infantry
- Size: 1 Battalion
- Part of: Royal Berkshire Regiment
- Garrison/HQ: Reading, Berkshire
- Motto: Pro aris et focis
- March: The Berkshire Militia March
- Engagements: Battle of Worcester

Commanders
- Notable commanders: Jacob Astley, 1st Baron Astley of Reading; Montagu Bertie, 7th Earl of Abingdon

The Royal Berkshire Militia was an auxiliary (Note: It is incorrect to describe the British Militia as 'irregular': throughout their history they were equipped and trained exactly like the line regiments of the regular army, and once embodied in time of war they were fulltime professional soldiers for the duration of their enlistment.) military regiment in the county of Berkshire in Southern England. From their formal organisation as Trained Bands, in 1572 and their service during the Armada Crisis and in the English Civil War, the Militia of Berkshire served during times of international tension and all of Britain's major wars. The regiment provided internal security and home defence but sometimes operated further afield, relieving regular troops from routine garrison duties and acting as a source of trained officers and men for the Regular Army. It later became a battalion of the Royal Berkshire Regiment, and prepared thousands of reinforcements for the fighting battalions of the regiment in World War I. After 1921 the militia had only a shadowy existence until its final abolition in 1953.

== Early history ==
The English militia was descended from the Anglo-Saxon Fyrd, the military force raised from the freemen of the shires under command of their Sheriff. It continued under the Norman kings. The force was reorganised under the Assizes of Arms of 1181 and 1252, and again by King Edward I's Statute of Winchester of 1285. In addition to the ams and armour kept by householders under these statutes, there are records from 1488 to 1489 of a 'Town Guard' of six men maintained by the Berkshire town of Reading. Reading provided a Troop of 24 horsemen on 12 September 1542 for King Henry VIII's campaign in Scotland that culminated in the Battle of Solway Moss on 24 November. Two years later the town sent 13 horsemen and 20 foot to serve in the Siege of Boulogne. Henry also issued orders for home defence: the county forces were to be mustered under the Lord Lieutenant, assisted by the Deputy Lieutenants and Justices of the Peace (JPs). On the death of King Edward VI Reading supplied a detachment of 10 men to support Queen Mary I against the rebellion of the Duke of Northumberland, and later to attend the coronation.

The legal basis of the militia was updated in Mary's reign with two acts of 1557 covering musters (4 & 5 Ph. & M. c. 3) and the maintenance of horses and armour (4 & 5 Ph. & M. c. 2). The entry into force of these acts in 1558 is seen as the starting date for the organised county militia in England.

== Berkshire Trained Bands ==
Berkshire was one of the southern counties called upon to send troops to suppress the Rising of the North in 1569. Although the militia obligation was universal, this assembly confirmed that it was impractical to train and equip every able-bodied man. After 1572 the practice was to select a proportion of men for the Trained Bands (TBs), who were mustered for regular training. The Armada Crisis in 1588 led to the mobilisation of the trained bands on 23 July. The previous April Berkshire had mustered 3120 able-bodied men, of whom 1000 were trained and a further 930 untrained men were 'pioneers'. In addition the county fielded 10 'lances' (heavy cavalry), 180 light horse, and 35 'petronels' (the petronel was an early cavalry firearm). The Berkshire TBs were present at the camp at Tilbury where Queen Elizabeth I gave her Tilbury speech on 9 August. The Berkshire contingent of the Queen's bodyguard comprised 230 horsemen. After the defeat of the Armada, the army was dispersed to its counties to avoid supply problems, but the men were to hold themselves in readiness. A further Spanish invasion alert in 1599 led to a partial mobilisation, with Reading furnishing 140 men.

In the 16th Century little distinction was made between the militia and the troops levied by the counties for overseas expeditions, and Berkshire supplied levies almost every year from 1585: by 1602, 469 had been sent to Ireland, 480 to France, and 675 to the Netherlands. However, the counties usually conscripted the unemployed and criminals rather than the Trained Bandsmen – in 1585 the Privy Council had ordered the impressment of able-bodied unemployed men, and the Queen ordered 'none of her trayned-bands to be pressed'. Replacing the weapons issued to the levies from the militia armouries was a heavy cost on the counties.

=== Bishops' Wars ===
With the passing of the threat of invasion, the trained bands declined in the early 17th Century, though there was a great muster in 1614 and the Berkshire TBs continued to carry out annual exercises. Later, King Charles I attempted to reform them into a national force or 'Perfect Militia' answering to the king rather than local control. In 1638 the Berkshire Trained Band consisted of 1100 men, of whom 680 were musketeers and 420 'corslets' (armoured pikeman), while the Berkshire Trained Band Horse comprised 59 Cuirassiers (armoured men) and 31 Harquebusiers (armed with carbines).

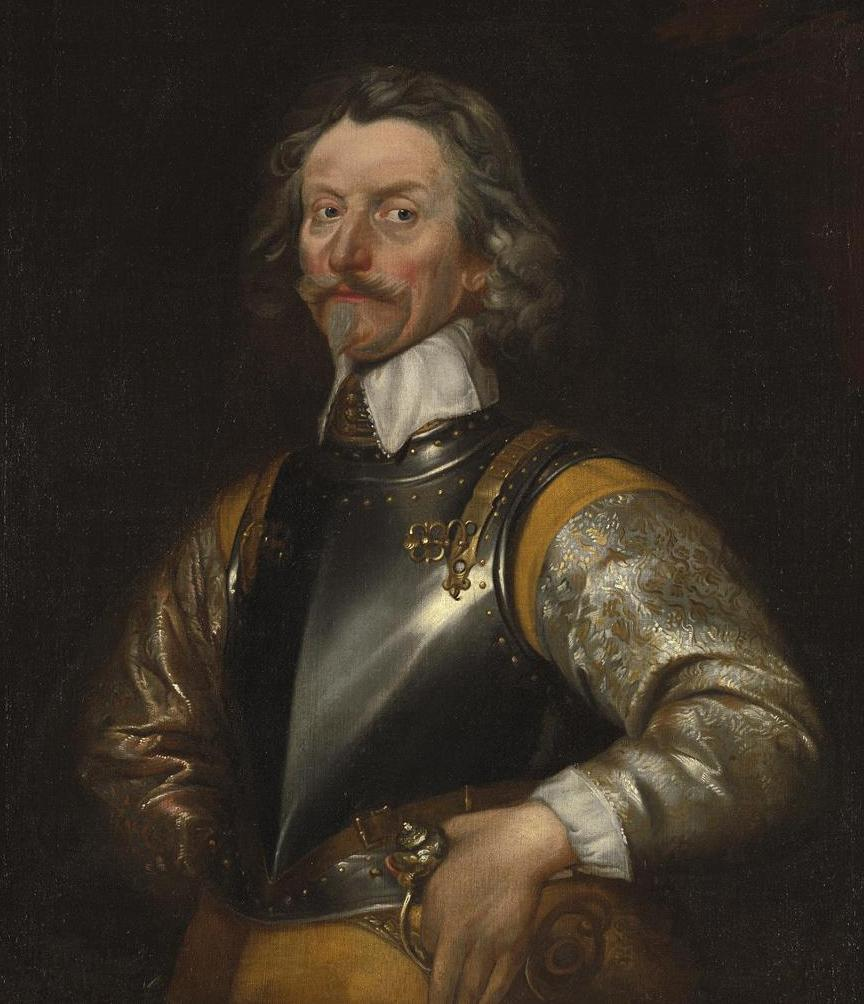
Sgt-Maj-Gen Sir Jacob Astley, later Lord Astley of Reading.

The Berkshire TBs were embodied in 1640 when a large force was called out for the Second Bishops' War. The county was ordered to send 600 men overland to join the army mustering at Newcastle upon Tyne. Sergeant-Major-General Sir Jacob Astley was appointed colonel of the Berkshire and Oxfordshire contingents. Once again, it seems that many of the trained bandsmen nationwide escaped service and raw substitutes were sent in their place. The deputy lieutenants of Berkshire encountered difficulty in raising the necessary money and men: only about 120 men from the Radley area came forward of the 240 due from Abingdon Division. Further, many of the men sent from the different counties bribed or bullied the conducting officers to release them. Captain William Lower led his Berkshire company through Brackley in Northamptonshire, where they met several mutineers from Daventry who told them tales of being sold into slavery. Lower promised that his men would not be forced to take a single step outside the kingdom, but they refused to believe him and threatened to beat out his brains. The men of the Reading Division told Astley they 'would not fight against the Gospel' or be commanded by 'Papists', and would march no further. After his Berkshire and Oxfordshire men disbanded themselves, Astley continued to the Scots Border to take up command of the King's infantry. Further efforts by the Lord Lieutenant, the Earl of Holland, raised a Troop of horse in Berkshire, but the men of the Vale of White Horse were particularly reluctant to serve.

=== Civil War ===
Control of the trained bands was one of the major points of dispute between Charles I and Parliament that led to the English Civil War. However, with a few exceptions neither side made much use of the trained bands during the war beyond securing the county armouries for their own full-time troops, many of whom were recruited from their ranks. Open warfare between the King and Parliament broke out in the autumn of 1642. Lieutenant-Colonel John Venn, MP, was sent with a detachment of 12 companies of the London Trained Bands (LTBs) to secure Windsor Castle for Parliament. Holland raised the Berkshire TBs for Parliament, and they and the Surrey TBs soon arrived to take over garrisoning the castle under Venn. Venn's permanent regiment, recruited in London and officered by former LTB officers, arrived to garrison Windsor on 29 October. After the inconclusive Battle of Edgehill Prince Rupert led the advance guard of the Royalist army through Berkshire, when the Parliamentarians evacuated Reading on 4 November. However, Windsor rejected his summons on 7 November and he continued towards London, joining the King's main body west of the city, where the Parliamentarian Army, supported by the LTBs, blocked the Royalists' advance on London at the Battle of Turnham Green on 13 November.

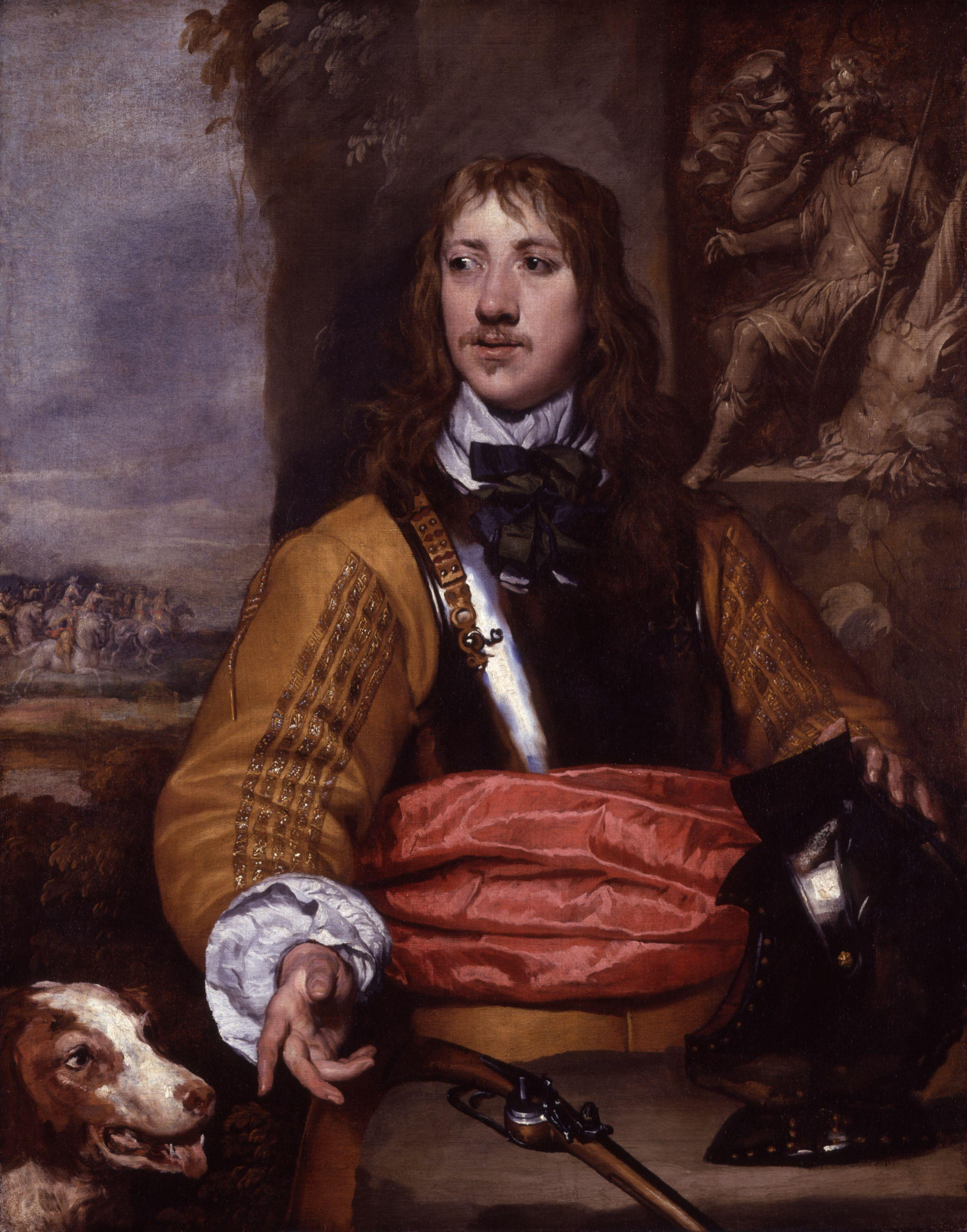
Sir Richard Neville by William Dobson

Berkshire was fought over continually in the subsequent campaigns in the Thames Valley – Reading changed hands several times – and effectively each side drew a regiment of TBs from the county for garrison duty. Berkshire TB detachments fought on both sides at the First Battle of Newbury on 20 September 1643, after which the Royalists regained Reading. In April 1644 Colonel Sir Richard Neville, the Royalist High Sheriff of Berkshire, was commissioned to raise an Auxiliary TB regiment, apparently of 3 companies, to garrison Reading. The following month the Royalists demolished the fortifications of the town and withdrew to their main base at Oxford, where Neville's regiment continued to serve. At the Second Battle of Newbury on 27 October 1644, Major John Blagrave of Reading commanded the 300-strong Berkshire detachment of horse under Col Dalbier in the Parliamentarian army. During the latter stages of the First Civil War, Col John Barkstead was appointed Parliamentary Governor of Reading 12 August 1645, and the town had to support the cost of his regiment.

As Parliament tightened its grip on the country it passed legislation to reorganise the militia. New Militia Acts in 1648 and 1650 replaced lords lieutenant with county commissioners appointed by Parliament or the Council of State. From now on the term 'Trained Band' began to disappear in most counties. The Berkshire TBs were reunited into a single regiment in 1650 and Christopher Whichcote, who had been Governor of Windsor Castle for Parliament, was appointed as its colonel. During the Scottish invasion of the Third English Civil War in 1651, English county militia regiments were called out to supplement the New Model Army. In August the Berkshire Militia was ordered to a rendezvous at Oxford, leaving one of its companies to garrison Windsor Castle. The Berkshire Militia Horse Troop was present at the Battle of Worcester and was commended for its service in the charge.

Under the Commonwealth and Protectorate the militia received pay when called out, and operated alongside the New Model Army to control the country. In 1655 a Maj Butler was appointed to command the militia of Berkshire, Huntingdonshire, Northamptonshire and Rutlandshire. After several periods of service, the Berkshire Militia Horse were finally stood down in January 1660.

== Berkshire Militia ==
After the Restoration of the Monarchy, the English Militia was re-established by the Militia Act 1661 under the control of the king's lords lieutenant, the men to be selected by ballot. This was popularly seen as the 'Constitutional Force' to counterbalance a 'Standing Army' tainted by association with the New Model Army that had supported Cromwell's military dictatorship, and almost the whole burden of home defence and internal security was entrusted to the militia. The Berkshire Militia was re-established in 1661.

Following the Act of Uniformity 1662, it became part of the militia's duties to enforce the Act against Dissenters. At the end of October 1662 the Berkshire lieutenancy was ordered to employ their civil and military powers to suppress dissenting conventicles and to arrest the teachers.

The Second Anglo-Dutch War broke put in 1665 and when the Royal Navy was defeated at the Four Days' Battle in June 1666 the militia were ordered to be ready to assemble. In July selected county regiments were embodied to protect the threatened coastline. Three well-equipped companies (300 men) of the Berkshire Militia under Maj Peacock were sent to reinforce the Isle of Wight. The British victory at the St. James's Day Battle on 25–26 July removed the threat and the militia were sent home, However, when the Dutch raided the Medway the following year, Berkshire sent three companies and a troop of horse under Lt-Col Saunders to the Isle of Wight once more.

There was a general muster of the militia in 1685 during the Monmouth Rebellion. As the Royal army under the Earl of Feversham advanced into the West Country to meet the rebels, the Berkshire Militia at Reading, supported by the Oxfordshire Militia, secured his lines of communication. However, King James II had lost much of his support when William of Orange invaded in 1688: although the lords lieutenant were ordered to call out the militia there seems to have been general apathy, while senior military commanders and James's own family deserted him. The skirmish at Reading on 9 December involved not the militia but individual citizens firing from upstairs windows in support of William's troops.

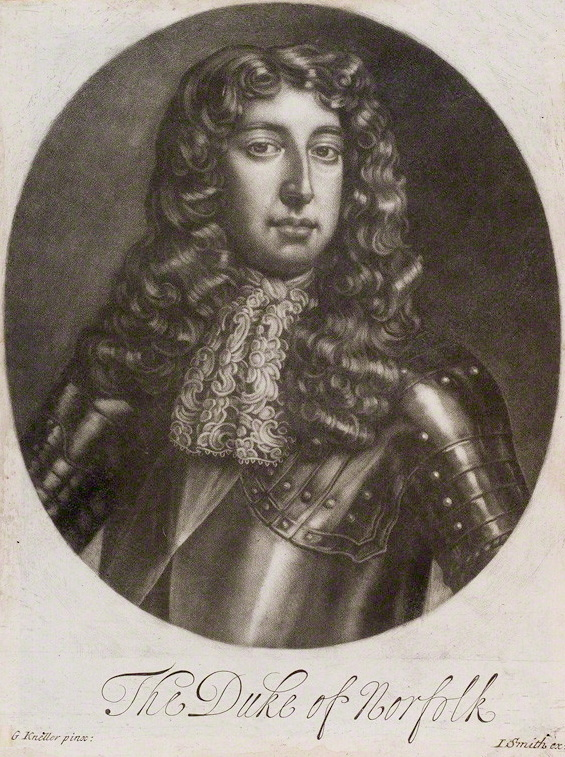
Henry Howard, 7th Duke of Norfolk

The militia were kept at a high level of efficiency during the subsequent reign of William III. During the winter of 1689–90, the Lord Lieutenant of Berkshire, the Duke of Norfolk, reported that the regiment of foot, consisting of 900 men in 9 companies, had good arms and were all clothed in grey, and there were 3 Troops of horse of between 50 and 60 men each, 'All which Militia have been lately settled and mustered in pursuance of their Majesties' commissions'. The following June the whole militia was called out after the Battle of Beachy Head, and the Berkshires joined a camp of 25,000 men at Portsmouth. The 1697 militia returns show that the Berkshire Militia were commanded by Norfolk as colonel, with 977 foot in 10 companies under Lt-Col Paul Coulston, and 175 horse in 3 troops under Captain-Lieutenant Edmund Sayer.

The militia were embodied in response to the Jacobite rising of 1715: on 25 October the Lord Lieutenant of Berkshire, the 2nd Duke of St Albans, was ordered to bring the county regiment, including the troop of horse, up to full strength and efficiency. Afterwards, the militia passed into virtual abeyance during the long peace that followed, although a few counties (not Berkshire) were called out during the Jacobite Rising of 1745.

== 1757 Reforms ==
=== Seven Years' War ===
Under threat of French invasion during the Seven Years' War a series of Militia Acts from 1757 re-established county militia regiments, the men being conscripted by means of parish ballots (paid substitutes were permitted) to serve for three years. There was a property qualification for officers, who were commissioned by the lord lieutenant. An adjutant and drill sergeants were to be provided to each regiment from the Regular Army, and arms and accoutrements would be supplied when the county had secured 60 per cent of its quota of recruits.

Berkshire was given a quota of 560 men to fill, and by the end of 1758 the Lord Lieutenant, the 3rd Duke of St Albans, had appointed Sir Willoughby Aston, 5th Baronet of Wadley, as colonel, Arthur Vansittart as lieutenant-colonel, and the Reading MP John Dodd as major. The Berkshire Militia was issued with its arms on 6 June 1759, when Maj Dodd exercised the Reading company for the first time. The regiment was embodied for permanent service on 26 July when the country was on high alert for a French invasion. The Berkshires were ordered to quarters in Marlborough, Hungerford and Devizes, but Sir Willoughby Aston was so keen to drill the men together that he persuaded the townsfolk of Devizes to billet the whole regiment for a few days. In October it went into winter quarters at Winchester Barracks.

In June 1760 the regiment left barracks to join an encampment outside Winchester where they were brigaded with the 34th Foot and the Gloucestershire, Bedfordshire, Dorsetshire and Wiltshire Militia, all under the command of Lieutenant-General the Earl of Effingham. This training camp was broken up in October, when the Berkshire Militia were marched in two divisions to quarters at Hungerford and Ilsley, and Newbury and Speen respectively. The following month it moved into its winter quarters, with five companies at Reading and two each at Wallingford and Oakingham (Wokingham).

On 18 March 1761 Col Aston was ordered to send two of his companies by the fastest route from Reading to Witney in Oxfordshire in support of the civil magistrates in suppressing riots. In April the regiment was sent out of Reading while elections were held there, and then concentrated once more to march back to Winchester. Here they camped near the Hessian troops along with the Wiltshire, Dorset, North and South Gloucestershire and South Hampshire Militia, once again under Effingham's command. In October the regiment was marched back to Reading and the following month went into winter quarters at Newbury. In March 1762 the regiment went back to Winchester, this time to guard French prisoners of war, returning to Newbury in April.

On 15 April 1762 Lt-Col Vansittart took over from Sir Willoughby Aston as colonel of the regiment, and Maj Dodd was promoted to replace him. The senior captain, William Mackworth Praed, accused Dodd of impeding his anticipated promotion to major, but Dodd was acquitted of unsoldierlike conduct by a Court-martial held at Reading.

The regiment spent June to October 1762 at its usual summer camp at Winchester. Peace negotiations were now under way (leading to the Treaty of Paris in February 1763) and the militia was disembodied in November 1762. From 1766 to 1777 the Berkshire Militia was regularly mustered for its 28 days' training each year, alternately at The Forbury, Reading, and the Market Place in Newbury.

=== American War of Independence ===
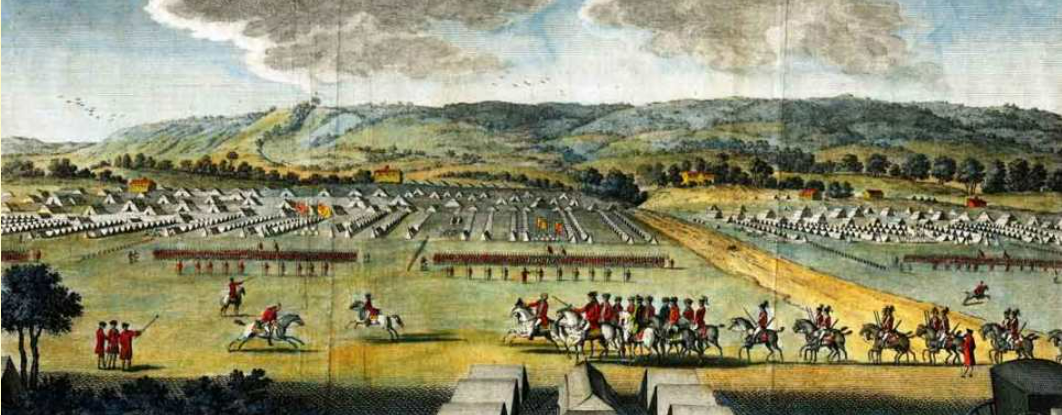
Coxheath Camp in 1778.

The American War of Independence broke out in 1775, and by 1778 Britain was threatened with invasion by the Americans' allies, France and Spain. The militia were embodied in March 1778, and on 1 June the Berkshires under Col Vansittart were ordered to Coxheath Camp near Maidstone in Kent, which was the army's largest training camp. Here the completely raw militia were exercised as part of a division alongside regular troops while providing a reserve in case of French invasion of South East England. The regiment returned to Reading for the winter on 17 November.

In February 1779 two companies were sent to quarters in Oxfordshire, one at Banbury and the other at Woodstock. In April the men reaching the end of their engagements were marched hime, and replaced by newly balloted men. The regiment also had to provide escorts to groups of prisoners from Reading Gaol who were being impressed into the army. In May the seven companies at Reading were dispersed across Oxfordshire to Henley-on-Thames, Nettlebed, Wallingford and Bensington, then in June it was concentrated again at Reading and marched to Essex, to be quartered at Romford, Ilford and Hare Street until their summer camp at Adarley Common was ready.

In March 1780 the regiment provided detachments to escort Spanish prisoners as far as Woodstock on their journey from Portsmouth to Shrewsbury, and then in May five companies were sent to Winchester to relieve the Staffordshire Militia who were guarding prisoners there. The remaining companies were sent from Reading to Hilsea Barracks, Portsmouth, a notoriously sickly site and much disliked by militia regiments unlucky enough to be stationed there. Illness was so widespread that the remaining fit junior officers had to do double duty, which irritated them to the point of resignation. In October the regiment was widely dispersed across Oxfordshire for winter quarters. For the General Election held that autumn, no less than 43 officers and 8 other ranks claimed leave in order to go home to vote.

In April 1781 the regiment marched from Oxfordshire to be quartered in villages north and east of London, then in May it went through the city to quarters around Sevenoaks and Maidstone in Kent, finally being sent on 6 June to join the encampment on Lenham Heath. At the end of the summer, it was quartered in Kentish villages from 31 October, with headquarters at Tunbridge Wells. On 24 June 1782 it was ordered back to Coxheath Camp where it spent the summer. In November it was ordered to quarters in villages around Rochester and Gillingham, but then returned to winter quarters in Newbury in early December. A peace treaty having been agreed in Paris, the militia was disembodied in March 1783.

=== French Revolutionary and Napoleonic Wars ===
From 1785 to 1791 the militia carried out 28 days' annual training, but to save money only two-thirds of the men were actually called out each year. As the international situation deteriorated in late 1792, the militia began to be embodied. Two thirds of the Berkshires were assembled at the Forbury, Reading, on 18 December, and a week later orders were issued to call out the remainder and to hold a ballot to fill vacancies. Hence the militia was already embodied when Revolutionary France declared war on Britain on 1 February 1793. However, the colonel, the Earl of Radnor, found that the fines levied in Berkshire on balloted men who did not wish to serve were not enough to hire volunteer substitutes, and in 1794 he proposed to keep repeating the ballot for each vacancy until it was filled.

The French Revolutionary Wars saw a new phase for the English militia: they were embodied for a whole generation, and became regiments of full-time professional soldiers (though restricted to service in the British Isles), which the regular army increasingly saw as a prime source of recruits. They served in coast defences, manning garrisons, guarding prisoners of war, and for internal security, while their traditional local defence duties were taken over by the Volunteers and mounted Yeomanry.

Early in 1793 the Royal Berkshires were quartered in towns along the South Coast of England. On 6 March, while commanding a detachment escorting French prisoners from Rye to Dover, Lieutenant the Earl of Barrymore died when the fusil he was carrying went off as he boarded his carriage. In July the regiment joined a large encampment at Broadwater Common, Waterdown Forest, outside Tunbridge Wells, one of several established in the invasion-threatened South East of England. The whole camp moved to Ashdown Forest at the beginning of August and then to Brighton for two weeks before returning to Broadwater Common. The camps were broken up on 29 October and the regiment went into winter quarters at Romsey in Hampshire.

In the spring of 1794 the Berkshire Militia marched to camp at Eastbourne, and then spent the summer as part of the defence cordon along the Kent coast. It was quartered in Deal and Sandwich for the winter, then was part of a great camp at Hythe in 1795. The next winter was spent in quarters in the Isle of Thanet. In 1796 the regiment marched into the West Country and was stationed around Totnes in Devon.

In a fresh attempt to have as many men as possible under arms for home defence in order to release regulars, in 1796 the Government created the Supplementary Militia, a compulsory levy of men to be trained in their spare time, and to be incorporated in the Regular Militia in emergency. Berkshire's quota was fixed at 749 men, but no additional regiments were formed. In January 1797 the Berkshire Militia sent a training cadre of two officers, two sergeants, a drummer and nine rank and file to Wokingham to train the first contingent of the supplementary militia for 20 days. The process was repeated at other Berkshire towns such as Wantage and Wallingford until the whole quota had undergone training. Later, many of the supplementaries were recruited into the Regular Army.

On 1 October 1797 the Berkshire Militia went into winter quarters at Bristol, where Lt-Col Francis Sykes was involved in a duel in which he was slightly wounded. In February 1798 the Berkshire Supplementary Militia was called out for training, and in May half of them (374 men) were drafted into the main body at Bristol, bringing it up to a strength of 12 companies. The regiment was relieved at Bristol on 9 June when it marched into Dorset, to barracks in Poole and Weymouth (6 companies each). On 27 August the whole regiment concentrated at Weymouth, joining a number of other militia regiments while King George III and the Royal Family were in residence during September. The regiment was reviewed by the king on two occasions. In October the Berkshires went into winter quarters in Portsmouth, with the Flank (Grenadier and Light) companies at Winchester until they joined the main body in June 1799.

A manpower crisis in the Regular Army in June 1799 led to a call for volunteers to transfer from the militia: six officers and 333 privates of the Berkshires volunteered, but according to regulations only four officers and 263 men could be accepted. However, another call in October for volunteers for the campaign in Holland led Captain Holdsworth and 150 men to transfer to the 15th Foot. When the Supplementary Militia were stood down another 150 men left the regiment, so that ballots had to be held to maintain its strength: by July 1800, while at Netley Camp outside Southampton, it was only 500 strong, half the numbers in 1798. In September a detachment escorting French prisoners at Winchester was diverted to help deal with bread riots at New Alresford. After wintering at Portsmouth the regiment returned to Weymouth in June 1801, where the Royal Family was again in residence for the summer. Peace negotiations were now under way, and in December the Berkshire Militia returned to Reading. They marched out to Weymouth again in early 1802, but after the Treaty of Amiens was signed in March they were disembodied at Reading on 24 April.

However, the peace was short-lived and the militia were called out again in 1803. The Berkshires were embodied at Reading on 30 March. After newly balloted men had been incorporated, the regiment marched to Ashford Barracks in Kent, which they shared with the 2nd Royal Surrey Militia, Meanwhile, the Berkshire Supplementary Militia was called out for internal security duty in Berkshire. On 15 October the regiment moved to Shorncliffe Camp, then from 1 December spent the winter at Walmer Barracks and North Infantry Barracks, Deal.

On 23 April 1804 the King conferred the title 'Royal' on 12 militia regiments, several of which had served at Weymouth during the Royal Family's summer residences, including the Berkshires. (Note: Though some sources suggest that the Berkshires bore the Royal title from 1760.)

The Royal Berkshire Militia (RBM) left Kent on 30 October for Chelmsford in Essex, and by 28 December was at Stoke Barracks at Ipswich. During the summer of 1805, when Napoleon was massing his 'Army of England' at Boulogne for a projected invasion, the regiment, with 611 men in 10 companies under the command of Lt-Col Thomas William Ravenshaw, was still stationed at Ipswich as part of Maj-Gen John Robinson's brigade. While at Ipswich the regiment took part in a grand review on Rushmere Heath before the Commander-in-Chief, the Duke of York. From Ipswich the regiment went back to Walmer on 28 August, where it provided working parties for Dover. It then marched to Taunton in Somerset. On the way it passed through Reading on 30/31 October, where the church bells were rung to greet the local regiment. From Taunton the regiment sent detachments to Bridgwater with prisoners of war, and to the coast defences at Berry Head, Torbay, Brixham and Fishcombe Battery. In the winter of 1806–7 the regiment was around Portsmouth, in Colewort Barracks and at Portsea. Its spent the summer of 1807 in Sussex at Steyning and Blatchington Barracks, with men quartered in Lewes, and in 1808 was at Hailsham Barracks.

=== Local Militia ===
While the Regular Militia were the mainstay of national defence during the Napoleonic Wars, they were supplemented from 1808 by the Local Militia, which were part-time and only to be used within their own districts. These were raised to counter the declining numbers of Volunteers, and if their ranks could not be filled voluntarily the militia ballot was employed. Berkshire raised three regiments:

- 1st Berkshire Local Militia: 10 companies commanded by Lt-Col F. Page
- 2nd Berkshire Local Militia 8 companies commanded by Lt-Col Henry Kearney, formerly of the Beynhurst Volunteers, later by Sir Morris Ximenes, formerly of the Wargrave Rangers
- 3rd or Queen's Regiment of Berkshire Local Militia: 7 companies commanded by Lt-Col the Marquess of Blandford

At the first annual training in 1809, there were disturbances among some of the new local militia units. At Reading the men were incited to lay down their arms by members of the Reading Loyal Volunteers, who had been drinking after the King's birthday parade.

=== Luddite riots ===
Meanwhile, the RBM continued its movements around the country. By July 1809 the regiment was at Great Yarmouth, and by the end of November 1810 it was at the great Prisoner-of-war camp at Norman Cross. Luddite riots began around Nottingham in November 1811, and the RBM was sent to the city from Weeley Barracks in Essex to reinforce the Local Militia and Volunteer Cavalry. 'Frame-breaking' by the rioters continued around the city despite the military presence. The disturbances spread across Northern England early in 1812, and the regiment sent detachments in February to maintain order in Manchester and Liverpool. In April the regiment passed through Derby in wagons to be deployed across Lancashire, at Liverpool, Preston, Blackburn and Colne Barracks. In November 1812 the regiment was transferred to South West England where corn riots had broken out around Plymouth. It was stationed at Somerton and then Bideford before going into Millbay Barracks at Plymouth for the winter.

=== Ireland ===
Legislation passed in 1798 and 1811 permitted English militia regiments to serve in Ireland for periods of two years, and in 1813 the RBM volunteered for this service. The men sailed from Plymouth between 29 April and 7 May, landing at Cobh of Cork on 12 May. They marched through Midleton to Athlone where they were quartered until the summer, receiving at least one draft of recruits from Reading. On 16 August the regiment left Athlone for Galway. A year later they were stationed at Tuam. A number of the Berkshire Local Militia also volunteered for overseas service in December 1813, but they were too late to be accepted as a formed regiment, though many transferred to the Regular Army.

Napoleon abdicated in April 1814 and it appeared that the wars were over. In September the English militia regiments in Ireland were ordered back to their home counties to be disembodied. The RBM marched from Tuam to Newry and then embarked for Liverpool in two ships on 29–30 September. Having concentrated after landing, the regiment was ordered to return to Reading for disembodiment, but the order was countermanded and it remained at Liverpool during the winter, at St Domingo House Barracks and Fort Barracks. Early in 1815 Napoleon returned from Elba, sparking off the short Waterloo campaign. Large numbers of embodied militiamen volunteered for the Regular Army, and it was said that a whole Troop of the 7th Hussars at Waterloo was composed of men from the Royal Berkshires while many other fought in the ranks of the Royal Horse Guards. It was not until September 1815 that the Royal Berkshire Militia finally arrived at Reading. The regiment was disembodied on 14 March 1816.

After Waterloo there was another long peace. Although officers continued to be commissioned into the militia and ballots were still held, the regiments were rarely assembled for training and the permanent staffs of sergeants and drummers (who were occasionally used to maintain public order) were progressively reduced. The ballot was suspended by the Militia Act 1829. In 1845–46 there was an effort to replace elderly members of the permanent staff and to appoint a few younger officers from the county gentry, though they had no duties to perform.

== 1852 Reforms ==
The Militia of the United Kingdom was revived by the Militia Act 1852, enacted during a renewed period of international tension. As before, units were raised and administered on a county basis, and filled by voluntary enlistment (although conscription by means of the Militia Ballot might be used if the counties failed to meet their quotas). Training was for 56 days on enlistment, then for 21–28 days per year, during which the men received full army pay. Under the Act, militia units could be embodied by Royal Proclamation for full-time home defence service in three circumstances:

1. 'Whenever a state of war exists between Her Majesty and any foreign power'.
2. 'In all cases of invasion or upon imminent danger thereof'.
3. 'In all cases of rebellion or insurrection'.

Berkshire's new militia quota was set at 777 men in eight companies. Of the officers still listed for the regiment only the colonel, John Blagrave, Lt-Col Charles Bacon, Major John Leveson-Gower of Bill Hill, one captain, one ensign and the surgeon were deemed to be 'effective', and it was not until 1855 that the regiment was fully officered. The revived regiment's first training took place at the Forbury, Reading, from 11 November to 1 December 1852, and a period of 28 day's training was carried out in each of the next two years. In 1855 men were selected to form the Grenadier (No 1) and Light (No 8) companies.

=== Crimean War and after ===
War having broken out with Russia in 1854 and an expeditionary force sent to the Crimea, the militia began to be called out for home defence. The Royal Berkshires were embodied at Reading on 1 January 1855, and the men were billeted in the town. About 700 men volunteered for the Line regiments, but by active recruiting the regiment was kept up to strength. Meanwhile, the whole regiment volunteered for overseas garrison duty and in July was accepted to serve in the Ionian Islands. In September it went by train to Portsmouth, leaving a small depot at Reading, and embarked for Corfu under the command of Lt-Col Bacon. The bulk of the regiment sailed aboard the Saldhana, while two companies sailed with the 3rd Middlesex Militia aboard the Great Tasmania. During the regiment's time in Corfu it lost about 50 men to Cholera, with about the same number of wives and children. The war ended with the Treaty of Paris on 30 March 1856, and on 16 May regular battalions returning from the Crimea relieved the militia in the Ionian Islands. The RBM sailed for home aboard the Imperador on 26 May, arriving at Spithead on 11 June. It returned to Reading and was disembodied on 4 July. For this service the regiment received the Battle honour Mediterranean, awarded on 9 June 1856.

When the Indian Mutiny broke out the following year, militia regiments were once again called out to release regulars for service there. The Royal Berkshires were embodied on 30 September 1857 and served at North Camp, Aldershot, until they were disembodied on 7 May 1858.

Thereafter, annual training (21 or 27 days) was carried out each year from 1859 to 1866. As an experiment in May 1867 the annual training was held at Aldershot in conjunction with the regulars stationed there. The Royal Berkshires, together with the 1st and 2nd Royal Surrey, the Oxfordshire and the Hampshire Militia formed a brigade attached to the Aldershot Division. The camp ended with a field day and was considered a success, being repeated in subsequent years. The RBM attended again in 1868 and 1870–75, usually forming part of 3rd Brigade.

The Militia Reserve introduced in 1867 consisted of present and former militiamen who undertook to serve overseas in case of war.

== Cardwell Reforms ==
Under the 'Localisation of the Forces' scheme introduced by the Cardwell Reforms of 1872, militia regiments were brigaded with their local regular and Volunteer battalions. Sub-District No 41 (Berkshire) was formed at Reading:

- 49th (Princess Charlotte of Wales's) (Hertfordshire) Regiment of Foot
- 66th (Berkshire) Regiment of Foot
- Royal Berkshire Militia
- 1st Berkshire Rifle Volunteer Corps

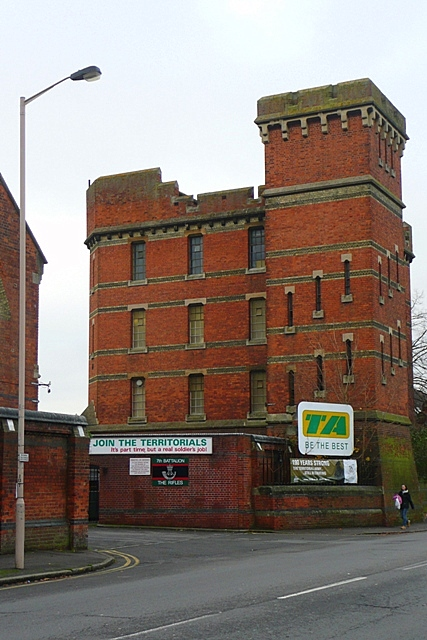
Brock Barracks, Oxford Road, Reading.

The sub-districts were to establish a brigade depot for their linked battalions: Brock Barracks, on Oxford Road, Reading, was completed as the depot in 1881, and the militia store at Mill Lane, Reading, was closed. It was intended that each sub-district would have two regular and two militia battalions, but the proposed 2nd Royal Berkshire Militia was never formed. The militia now came under the War Office rather than their county lords lieutenant. Around a third of the recruits and many young officers went on to join the regular army.

Following the Cardwell Reforms a mobilisation scheme began to appear in the Army List from December 1875. This assigned Regular and Militia units to places in an order of battle of corps, divisions and brigades for the 'Active Army', even though these formations were entirely theoretical, with no staff or services assigned. The RBM was assigned to 2nd Brigade of 3rd Division, V Corps. The division would have mustered at Gloucester in time of war, and did actually undertake collective training at Minchinhampton Common in 1876 during the international crisis that led to the Russo-Turkish War; the Militia Reserve were also called out during this crisis. In 1877 the annual training was carried out at Rushmoor, Aldershot, with the RBM camped alongside the 49th Foot and the depot companies of the 66th Foot. For the next two years training was carried out at the new depot at Reading, with a musketry range at Coley.

== Royal Berkshire Regiment ==
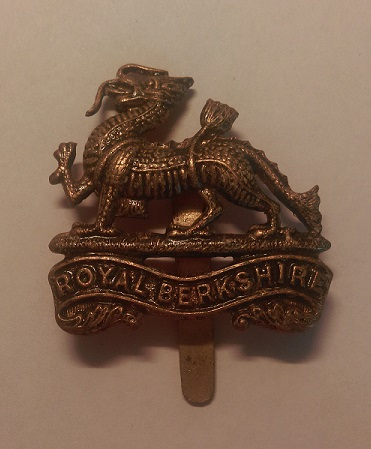
Cap badge of the Royal Berkshires, featuring the Chinese Dragon of the 49th Foot.

The Childers Reforms took Cardwell's reforms further, with the linked battalions forming single regiments. From 1 July 1881 the 49th and 66th Regiments became the 1st and 2nd Battalions of Princess Charlotte of Wales's (Berkshire Regiment), with the Royal Berkshire Militia as the 3rd Battalion. The militia were dissatisfied at losing the 'Royal' title conferred upon the regiment in 1804, but the Berkshire Regiment was itself awarded the title on 29 September 1885 after its distinguished service at the Battle of Tofrek.

The 3rd Battalion returned to Aldershot for its annual training in 1882, in which year it was re-equipped with Martini–Henry rifles in place of the old Snider Rifle. In following years (except 1882 and 1887 at Aldershot, and 1884 when there was an outbreak of smallpox) the battalion camped behind the depot in Reading for its annual training. In 1893, after completing its musketry course at Reading, the battalion moved to Ashdown Forest to take part in home defence manoeuvres as part of 18th Brigade in II Corps. In 1894 the battalion was re-equipped with the magazine Lee–Metford rifle, the increased power of which made the range at Coley unsafe: a new range was established on Churn Down on the Berkshire Downs, on land provided by the Lord Lieutenant of Berkshire, Lord Wantage. In 1895 the battalion was again mobilised for manoeuvres with 18th Brigade, which were carried out at Lydd where the ranges wee also used. In 1896 the battalion was invited to participate in summer manoeuvres at Aldershot, but Lt-Col Bowles pointed out that some 500 men would be engaged in the harvest, so the battalion trained as usual at Reading and Churn in the spring of 1896 and 1897.

=== Second Boer War ===
After the disasters of Black Week at the start of the Second Boer War in December 1899, most of the regular army was sent to South Africa, and many militia units were called out to replace them for home defence. The 3rd Berkshires were embodied from 19 February 1900 to 13 July 1901 and were stationed at Kilkenny in Ireland.

== Special Reserve ==
After the Boer War, there were moves to reform the Auxiliary Forces (militia, yeomanry and volunteers) to take their place in the six army corps proposed by St John Brodrick as Secretary of State for War. However, little of Brodrick's scheme was carried out. Under the sweeping Haldane Reforms of 1908, the militia was replaced by the Special Reserve, a semi-professional force similar to the previous militia reserve, whose role was to provide reinforcement drafts for regular units serving overseas in wartime. The 3rd (Royal Berkshire Militia) Bn became the 3rd (Reserve) Battalion, Princess Charlotte of Wales's (Royal Berkshire Regiment) in the SR on 7 June 1908.

Lt Col Frederick Barker took over command on 20 April 1909. Annual training took place at Salisbury Plain (1910), Felixstowe (1911), Churn Camp (1912) and Perham Down Camp (1913). The battalion's last ever annual training was at Landguard Fort, Felixstowe, in May 1914.

== World War I ==
=== 3rd (Reserve Battalion ===
On the outbreak of World War I, the battalion mobilised at Reading on 4 August 1914 under Lt-Col Barker. Later that month it went to its war station at Purbrook Camp, Portsmouth.

The 3rd Battalion's role was to equip the Reservists and Special Reservists of the Royal Berkshire Regiment and send them as reinforcement drafts to the regular battalions on the Western Front. Once the pool of reservists had dried up, the 3rd Bn trained thousands of raw recruits for the active service battalions. The 9th (Reserve) Battalion (see below) was formed in October 1914 alongside the 3rd Bn in Portsmouth to provide reinforcements for the 'Kitchener's Army' battalions of the Royal Berkshires, and in May 1916 the 10th (Labour) Battalion was also formed at Portsmouth from men who were unfit for frontline service.

In November 1917 the 3rd Bn was moved to Ireland, and it served at Dublin until the end of the war. It continued working after the Armistice with Germany until 21 August 1919, when the remaining personnel were transferred to the 2nd Bn, and the 3rd Battalion was disembodied on 5 September 1919.

=== 9th (Reserve) Battalion ===
After Lord Kitchener issued his call for volunteers in August 1914, the battalions of the 1st, 2nd and 3rd New Armies ('K1', 'K2' and 'K3' of 'Kitchener's Army') were quickly formed at the regimental depots. The SR battalions also swelled with new recruits and were soon well above their establishment strength. On 8 October 1914 each SR battalion was ordered to use the surplus to form a service battalion of the 4th New Army ('K4'). Accordingly, the 3rd (Reserve) Battalion formed the 9th (Service) Battalion at Portsmouth. It was to be part of 96th Brigade in 32nd Division and began training for active service. On 10 April 1915 the War Office decided to convert the K4 units into 2nd Reserve battalions to train reinforcement drafts for the K1–K3 battalions, in the same way that the SR did for the regular battalions. The battalion became 9th (Reserve) Bn, and 96th Bde became 8th Reserve Brigade. In May 1915 the battalion moved with the brigade to Wool, Dorset. On 1 September 1916 the 2nd Reserve battalions were transferred to the Training Reserve (TR) and the battalion was redesignated as 37th Training Reserve Bn, still in 8th Reserve Bde. The training staff retained their Berkshire badges. On 1 July 1917 it was redesignated again as 210th (Infantry) Battalion, TR, and on 16 July it joined 193rd Brigade in 64th Division at Taverham in Norfolk. On 27 October 1917 it was transferred to the Devonshire Regiment as 52nd (Graduated) Battalion and went into winter quarters in Norwich. On 26 February 1918 it moved to 192nd Bde in 64th Division, and in May it was at Holt, Norfolk, where it remained for the rest of the war. On 8 February 1919 it was converted into a service battalion and joined the British Army of the Rhine, where it was disbanded on 19 February.

=== Postwar ===
The SR resumed its old title of Militia in 1921 but like most militia units the 3rd Berkshires remained in abeyance after World War I. By the outbreak of World War II in 1939, no officers remained listed for the battalion. The Militia was formally disbanded in April 1953.

== Commanders ==
Regimental commanders included:

Colonels

- Sgt-Maj-Gen Sir Jacob Astley, 1640
- Col Sir Richard Neville, commissioned to raise Royalist Berkshire Auxiliary TBs
- Col John Barkstead, appointed Parliamentary Governor of Reading 12 August 1645
- Col Christopher Whichcote, Parliamentary Governor of Windsor Castle, commissioned 1650
- Arthur Evelyn, Parliamentary Governor of Abingdon, commissioned as captain of the horse troop 23 August 1650, promoted to colonel 30 October 1650
- Henry Howard, 7th Duke of Norfolk in 1688–89 and 1697 as Lord Lieutenant
- Sir Willoughby Aston, 5th Baronet of Wadley, commissioned 1758
- Arthur Vansittart of Shottesbrooke Park, promoted 15 April 1762
- William Craven, 6th Baron Craven, appointed Lord Lieutenant 1786, died 1791
- Jacob Pleydell-Bouverie, 2nd Earl of Radnor, Lord Lieutenant from 1791, commissioned 24 December 1791, resigned 1801
- Arthur Vansittart, son of the above, promoted 18 February 1801, resigned 25 September 1812
- Thomas Ravenshaw of Bracknell, promoted 9 December 1812, died 14 August 1842
- John Blagrave of Southcote and Calcot, promoted November 1842; resigned 1861

Lieutenant-Colonel Commandant
After the 1852 reforms, the rank of colonel in the militia was abolished, and replaced by a lieutenant-colonel commandant:

- Adam Blandy, promoted 6 April 1861; appointed Chief Constable of Berkshire 1863
- Montagu, Lord Norreys (succeeded as 7th Earl of Abingdon 1884), promoted 31 July 1863, retired 27 October 1880
- Victor van de Weyer of Kingston Lisle and New Lodge, Windsor, promoted 22 February 1881, resigned 17 April 1886
- John Blandy-Jenkins of Kingston and Llanharran, promoted 18 July 1885, resigned 16 June 1888
- George Houblon-Archer of Welford Park, promoted 16 June 1888, resigned 28 March 1894
- Thomas John Bowles, promoted 21 April 1894
- Walter Thornton, promoted 21 April 1904
- Frederick G. Barker, promoted 20 April 1909

Honorary Colonel
The following served as Honorary Colonel:

- Charles Bacon of Elcott, former Lt-Col, appointed 19 April 1861
- Lt-Col Montagu Bertie, 7th Earl of Abingdon, former Lt-Col, appointed 27 October 1880, reappointed to SR 7 June 1908

Other officers
Other notable officers who served with the regiment included:

- William Flower, 3rd Viscount Ashbrook (1787–95)
- Richard Barry, 7th Earl of Barrymore (1789–93), and his brother the Hon Augustus Barry (1790–93)
- Richard Griffin-Neville, 2nd Baron Braybrooke (1779) and his son the Hon Richard Neville (1803–4)
- The Hon Charles Brudenell-Bruce later 1st Marquess of Ailesbury (1792, to Wiltshire Yeomanry 1796)
- George Brudenell-Bruce, Viscount Savernake, later 4th Marquess of Ailesbury (1881–86)
- Sir George Bowyer, 6th Baronet of Radley (1803–4)
- William Craven, 2nd Earl of Craven (1829–30) grandson of 6th Baron above, father of William, Viscount Uffington (1864–65) and the Hon Osbert Craven (1878–72, later to Berkshire Yeomanry) and grandfather of the Hon Rupert Craven (1890–95)
- John Anthony Fonblanque (1780)
- Arthur Gore, Viscount Sudley, later 6th Earl of Arran (1887, to Royal Horse Guards 1889)
- Sir Claudius Hunter, 2nd Baronet (1852–56, later 1st Berkshire Rifle Volunteers) and his son Sir Charles Hunter, 3rd Baronet (1875, to 64th Foot 1878)
- Edward Loveden Loveden of Buscot (1779 to ca 1800) and his son Pryse Pryse Loveden (1794)
- Sir William Milman, 2nd Baronet (1808–12)
- Henry Bromley, 3rd Baron Montfort (1798; to 26th Foot 1803)
- Elliot Morres (1855; to 47th Foot 1855)
- Sir Warwick Morshead, 3rd Baronet (1863–64)
- Sir Robert Mowbray, 2nd Baronet (1872–74)
- Sir Charles Nepean, 5th Baronet (1887 to early 1900s)
- Christopher Oldfield, formerly of the 85th Foot (1873)
- Lord Algernon Percy, formerly of the Grenadier Guards (1881, to 3rd Northumberland Fusiliers 1886)
- William Pleydell-Bouverie, 3rd Earl of Radnor (1803–4), and his son the Hon Edward Pleydell-Bouverie (from 1839), and nephew Hon Mark Bouverie (1870–72)
- John Edward Rhodes of Hennerton, (1887, to King's Royal Rifle Corps 1888) and his brother Hubert Victor Rhodes (1892, Later Sherwood Foresters)
- Clement Saxton (1762–87)
- Sir Francis Sykes, 2nd Baronet (resigned 1799)
- Mortimer George Thoyts of Sulhamstead (1832–3) and his son William Richard Mortimer Thoyts (1852–73)
- William John Bates van de Weyer (1890 to early 1900s) and his brother Bates Grimston van de Weyer (1894; to Scots Guards 1897), sons of Lt-Col W.V.B. van de Weyer (above)
- Sir Howard Vincent, joined from 23rd Foot 1873–75; later commanded the Queen's Westminsters
- Sir Morris Ximenes, Capt 1802–03, formerly commanded the Windsor Foresters or Berkshire Fencible Cavalry, later commanded the Wargrave Rangers, retiring in March 1809 to command the 2nd Berkshire Local Militia

== Heritage and ceremonial ==
=== Uniforms and insignia ===
In 1553 the Reading contingent at Queen Mary and King Philip's coronation wore blue coats with red crosses. In 1689–90 the Berkshire Militia wore grey coats. The Regimental Colour issued in 1759 carried the Coat of arms of the Duke of St Albans (as Lord Lieutenant) on a blue background, implying that the uniform Facing colour was also blue, which was retained when it became a 'Royal' regiment in 1804. In 1779 the regiment wore red coats faced in light blue. In 1794 militia officers were permitted to wear a blue undress uniform faced in red; this may have been extended to the permanent staff because in 1799 the Pay Sergeant was recorded as wearing a 'new blue coat and a new round hat' (the latter probably similar to the headgear of the Royal Marines). On joining the Berkshire Regiment in 1881 the militia battalion adopted its white facings but reverted to blue when the regiment was awarded the 'Royal' title in 1885.

Around 1810 the officers' shoulder-belt plate bore a crown within a pierced rope garter inscribed 'Berkshire Militia'. From at least 1815 the officers' buttons carried the Royal cypher within a crowned star and garter, with 'Berkshire' (later 'Royal Berkshire') above the crown and 'Militia' beneath the star. These continued to be worn until 1881.

The Shako star plate and officer's shoulder-belt plate around 1830 also had the St George's cross within the garter, with the title below. From 1855 the shako plate had a stag beneath a branch of an oak tree, surrounded by a garter inscribed Pro aris et focis ('For hearth and home'). This badge and motto also appeared on the new regimental colour embroidered by 'the ladies of Berkshire' in 1855. The stag and oak tree was later adopted by the whole of Princess Charlotte's (Royal Berkshire Regiment) for their Home Service helmet plates and Glengarry caps. The helmet plate had a red background, traditionally worn by the 49th Foot after the Battle of Brandywine in 1777. A simpler dragon badge (awarded to the 49th Foot after service in China) was used throughout the regiment on Forage caps and collars.

=== Regimental march ===
In 1792 Col the Earl of Radnor commissioned Zerubbabel Wyvill, a harpsichord and music master of Bray, near Maidenhead, to compose a Berkshire Militia March. It was scored for eight wind instruments, but by 1798 the regimental band was 20 strong. The band was maintained until the regiment was disembodied in 1816.

=== Precedence ===
During the American War of Independence the militia were given an order of precedence (by counties) determined by ballot each year. For the Berkshire Militia the positions were:

- 1 June 1778: 34th
- 12 May 1779: 11th
- 6 May 1780: 25th
- 28 April 1781: 29th
- 7 May 1782: 20th

The militia order of precedence balloted for in 1793 (Berkshire was 30th) remained in force throughout the French Revolutionary War. Another ballot for precedence took place at the start of the Napoleonic War in 1803, when Berkshire was 37th.This order continued until 1833. In that year the King drew the lots for individual regiments and the resulting list remained in force with minor amendments until the end of the militia. The regiments raised before the peace of 1763 took the first 47 places, and Berkshire was 7th. Most militia regiments paid little attention to the numeral.

=== Battle Honour ===
The regiment bore the single Battle honour Mediterranean, awarded on 9 June 1856 for its service in Corfu. This was rescinded in 1910 when the Special Reserve battalions assumed the same honours as their parent regiments.

== See also ==
- Trained Bands
- Militia (English)
- Militia (Great Britain)
- Militia (United Kingdom)
- Special Reserve
- Royal Berkshire Regiment
