= Squib =

Squib may refer to:

- Squib (explosive), a miniature explosive with a very small charge
  - Bullet hit squib, a practical effect simulating a gunshot wound in film and theatre
- Squib (Harry Potter)
- Squib (Star Wars)
- Squib (writing)
- Squib kick, an American football play
- Squib load, a firearm malfunction
- Squib sailboat
- Squibs (1921 film), a 1921 film starring Betty Balfour
- Squibs (1935 film), a 1935 remake film also starring Balfour

== See also ==
- Squibb, surname
