= David Ximenes =

British Army Lieutenant-General

Lieutenant-General Sir David Ximenes KCH JP
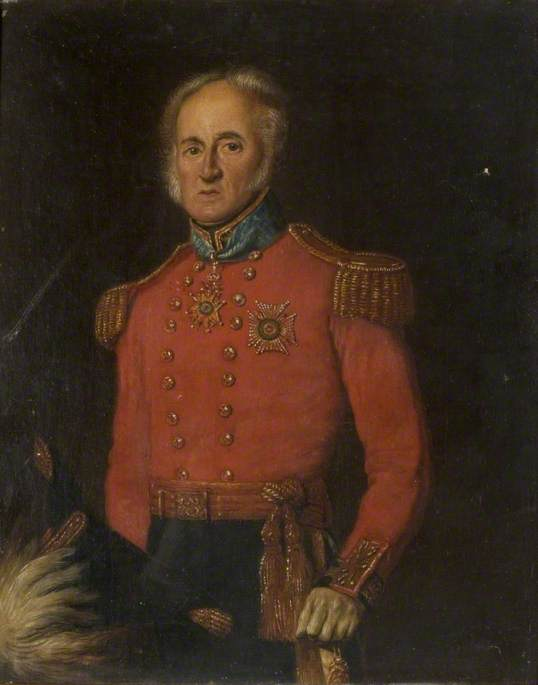
- Portrait of Ximenes as a lieutenant-colonel
- Born: 1777; London
- Died: 16 August 1848, age 71; Bear Ash, Maidenhead, Berkshire
- Relatives: Sir Morris Ximenes (brother)
- Military career
- Allegiance: United Kingdom
- Branch: British Army
- Service years: 1794–1847
- Rank: Lieutenant-General
- Commands: 62nd Regiment of Foot
- Conflicts: French Revolutionary War; Napoleonic Wars; Peninsular War; War of 1812; Battle of Hampden
- Awards: Knight Commander of the Royal Guelphic Order (1832); Knight bachelor (1832)
- Other work: Magistrate for Berkshire

Lieutenant-General Sir David Ximenes KCH JP (1777–1848) was a British Army officer, magistrate and Berkshire landowner.

He was a descendant of Cardinal Ximenes de Cisneros, the Grand Inquisitor. His family converted to the Anglican faith in the late 18th century and were amongst the first Jewish families to do so. This was in order to serve in official capacities within the British power structure, then prohibited to non-Anglicans. It appears that they did not have to do much with the Jewish community in England after that time. He was the youngest son of David Ximenes Senior of Bear Place at Hare Hatch, near Wargrave in Berkshire, and brother to Sir Morris Ximenes of the same place. He was present at the Battle of Waterloo. In England, he lived at Bear Ash, also at Hare Hatch in Berkshire.
