= Christopher Oldfield =

English cricketer and British Army officer

Personal information
- Full name: Christopher Campbell Oldfield
- Born: 30 October 1838; Patna, Bengal Presidency, British India
- Died: 14 May 1916 (aged 77); Westminster, London, England

Domestic team information
- Years: Team
- 1864: Gentlemen of Kent
- 1865: Gentlemen of England
- 1865–1873: Gentlemen of the MCC

Career statistics
Competition	First-class
Matches	4
Runs scored	24
Batting average	4.80
100s/50s	0/0
Top score	19
Balls bowled	421
Wickets	9
Bowling average	15.22
5 wickets in innings	0
10 wickets in match	0
Best bowling	4/45
Catches/stumpings	1/–
- Source: Cricinfo, 11 October 2018

Christopher Campbell Oldfield JP (30 October 1838 – 14 May 1916) was an English British Army officer who played first-class cricket.

== Early life and education ==
Oldfield was born at Patna in British India in October 1838, to Edith Frances Sheridan Guinness and her husband, William (or Henry) Swann Oldfield of the Bengal Civil Service. He studied in England at Exeter College, Oxford. In December 1859 he was commissioned into the British Army as an Ensign in the 10th Foot Regiment. He was promoted to Lieutenant in May 1863.

== Career ==
Oldfield made his debut in first-class cricket in 1864, playing for the Gentlemen of Kent against the Gentlemen of the Marylebone Cricket Club during Canterbury Cricket Week. (Note: At the time Canterbury week was a major social event. Many amateur cricketers, who would not otherwise have played first-class cricket, played matches during the week which usually featured two or three matches which have since been awarded first-class cricket status.) He made two further first-class appearances in 1865, first for the Gentlemen of England against the Gentlemen of Middlesex at Islington, and then for the Gentlemen of the MCC against the Gentlemen of Kent during that year's Canterbury Week.

From 1866, Oldfield was posted to Ireland, where he played cricket, including in noon-first-class matches for Ireland until 1871. By 1867, he was serving with the 85th Foot Regiment, rising to the rank of Captain in August 1867. He married Edith Frances Sheridan Guinness, of the Guinness family, in December 1872.

By 1873, Oldfield was serving in the 38th Foot, retiring on half-pay in November of that year. Following his retirement, he joined the Royal Berkshire Militia, serving from 1873 until 1877. Following an eight-year gap, Oldfield made his fourth and final appearance in first-class cricket during the 1873 Canterbury Week, playing again for the Gentlemen of the MCC, this time with Kent County Cricket Club as the opponents. In May 1877, he resigned his commission from the reserve militia. Beyond his military service and playing cricket, Oldfield was a Justice of the Peace. He was also in the service of the East India Company.

== Personal life ==
He died at Westminster in May 1916, his wife, with whom he had three children, having predeceased him sixteen years prior.
