= Morris Ximenes =

British Army captain & landowner

Sir Morris Ximenes (1762–1837), also known as Moses Ximenes, was a captain in the British Army and Berkshire landowner who had converted to Anglicanism from Judaism.

== Biography ==
Morris was born in London about 1762. He was a member of the London Exchange, where he made a large fortune. In 1802, he was elected a warden of the Bevis Marks Synagogue, but declined to accept; and on being fined he resigned from the community and became converted to Christianity. However, "he embraced his new faith while expressing the most friendly feelings towards the professors of the old faith."

In 1794, after the outbreak of the French Revolutionary War, Ximenes raised a Troop of the 'Windsor Foresters' or Berkshire Fencible Cavalry, a home defence regiment, and was given the rank of captain. His brother David Ximenes, a half-pay captain in the Regular Army, was commissioned into the Foresters as a lieutenant in January 1795. The regiment served in Lincolnshire and Scotland on anti-invasion and anti-smuggling duties. When it was disbanded in 1800 Morris Ximenes sought permission to raise a 'Troop of Gentlemen Cavalry' (Yeomanry) in Berkshire. He offered to pay for its clothing and kit if the arms and accoutrements of the disbanded Windsor Foresters were transferred to it. Royal permission was granted through the Lord Lieutenant and the Wargrave Rangers was formed, with Ximenes as captain. All the Yeomanry were stood down at the Treaty of Amiens, but when war was resumed in 1803 the Wargrave Rangers were reactivated and the officers received new commissions in April. David Ximenes returned to full-pay service in the 29th Foot, and Morris raised sufficient recruits for him to obtain promotion to major. In August 1803 Morris Ximenes offered to raise and pay for a corps of volunteer infantry to be attached to the Wargrave Rangers with wagons to travel in. It is not known if this proposal was taken up. Sir Morris Ximenes (as he had now become) retired from command of the Wargrave Rangers in March 1809 when he was appointed to a lieutenant-colonelcy in the 2nd Berkshire Local Militia.

He afterwards served in the Peninsular War as Captain Ximenes. (Note: Or is this a confusion with his brother David?)

He was appointed High Sheriff of Berkshire in 1805 and knighted in 1806. His chief residence was Bear Place at Hare Hatch, near Wargrave in Berkshire. He died in London in 1837.

It was suggested that he was perhaps descended from Francisco Jiménez de Cisneros, (1436–1517), twice regent of Spain and sometime Grand Inquisitor. (Ximenes and Jiménez: homonyms)

His younger brother, Sir David Ximenes, had no connection with the Jewish community.

== Notes ==
Honorary titles
Preceded by Nicholas Matthews	High Sheriff of Berkshire; 1805	Succeeded by John Englebert Liebenrood
