= Bear Place =

Listed country house in Berkshire, England

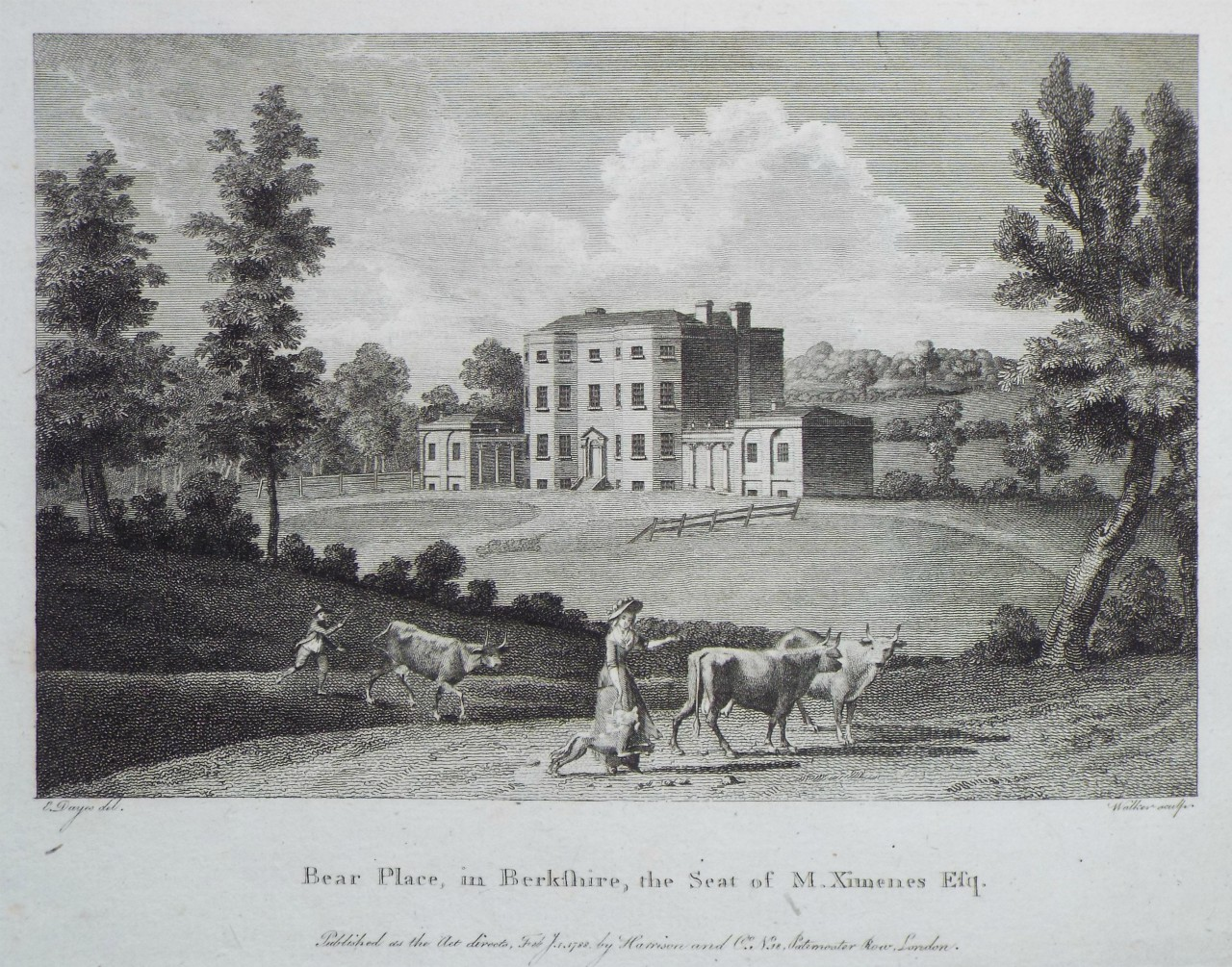
- Bear Place in 1788

- Location within Berkshire

General information
- Type: Country house
- Architectural style: Georgian
- Location: Hare Hatch, Berkshire, England
- Coordinates: 51°30′18″N 0°50′01″W
- Year built: 1784–85
- Client: David Ximenes, Senior

Design and construction
- Architect: Edward Edgerly

Listed Building – Grade II*
- Official name: Bear Place
- Designated: 26 January 1967; 59 years ago
- Reference no.: 1118177

Scheduled monument
- Official name: Moated site 100m south-west of Bear Place
- Designated: 3 March 1977; 49 years ago
- Reference no.: 1013137

Bear Place is an English country house. It is a historic Grade II* listed building. The house is located northeast of Wargrave, Berkshire.

== History ==
The house was built in 1784–1785 for David Ximenes, Senior, father of David Ximenes and Morris Ximenes.

In the 20th century, the house was owned by the Barons Remnant, beginning with James Remnant, 1st Baron Remnant in around 1930.

== Architecture ==
Bear Place is a three-storey, seven bay, Georgian brick house built with materials from a demolished Elizabethan house on the site, the moat of which still remains to the southwest of the current house. An unusual architectural feature of the house is that the three bays on either side of the entrance curve out to create bows. It was designed and built by Edward Edgerly of Hurley, and cost £843 (equivalent to £114,470 in 2025).

== See also ==
- Grade II* listed buildings in Berkshire
