= Richard Barry, 7th Earl of Barrymore =

English nobleman

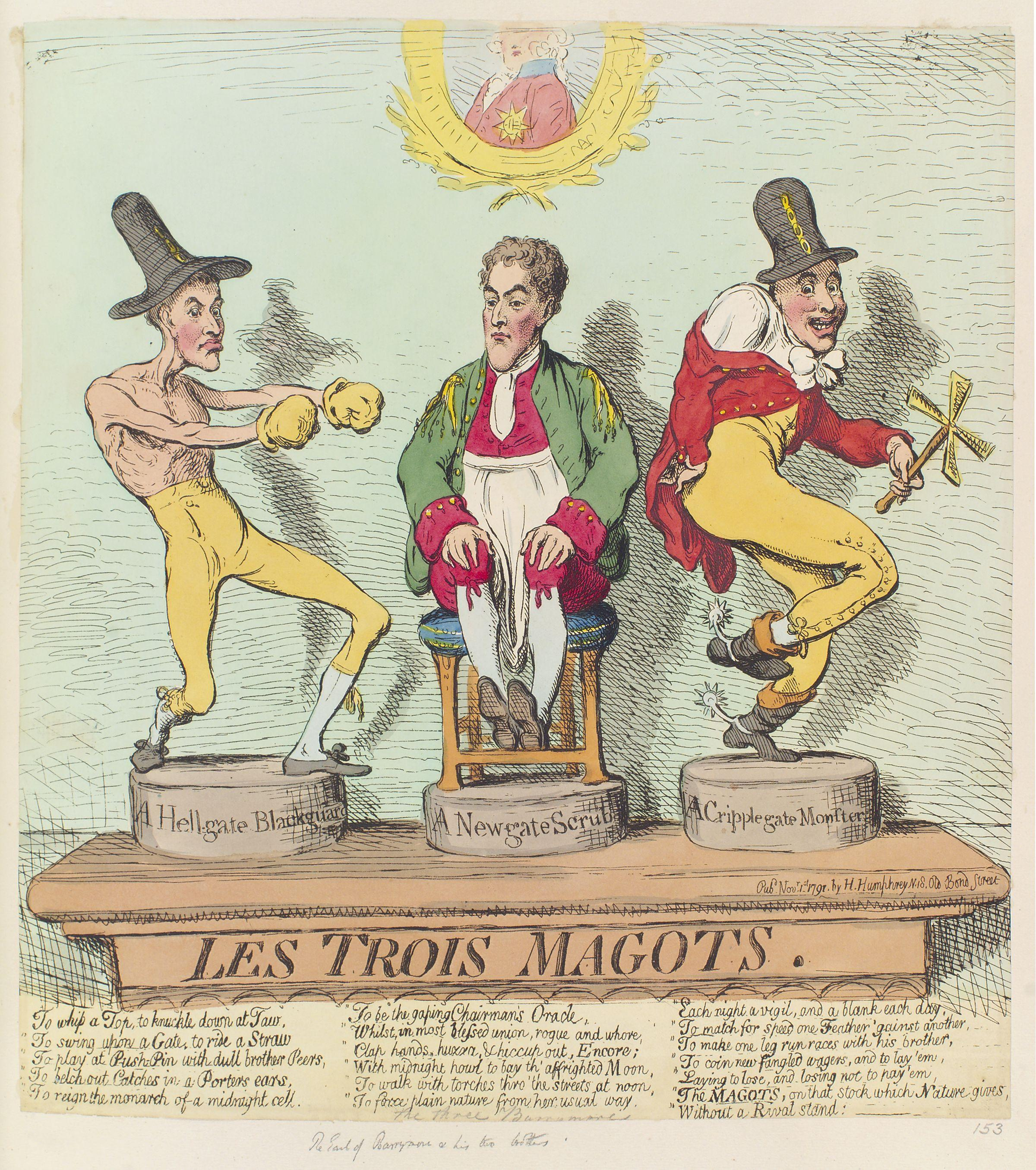
Richard "Hellgate" Barry and his brothers Augustus "Newgate" Barry and Henry "Cripplegate" Barry in a 1791 caricature by James Gillray. The Prince of Wales is portrayed in the background.

Richard Barry, 7th Earl of Barrymore (14 August 1769 – 6 March 1793) was an English nobleman of Irish heritage, as well as an infamous rake, gambler, sportsman, theatrical enthusiast and womanizer.

He was known as the Rake of Rakes and died at the age of 23.

== Family ==
Barrymore was born on 14 August 1769 in Marylebone, Middlesex, to Richard Barry, 6th Earl of Barrymore and Lady Amelia Stanhope, daughter of William Stanhope, 2nd Earl of Harrington and the Lady Caroline Fitzroy. He succeeded his father as Earl on 1 August 1773. His mother placed him under the care of the vicar of Wargrave in Berkshire, where he spent his pre-public school childhood and later settled.

He was educated at Eton College and arrived with an unusually large sum of £1,000 to his free will (equivalent to £145,923 in 2025). Soon he regularly summoned a London cab driver who would take him to London several times a week to satisfy his sexual appetite with a variety of 'ladies of the night'. He was a daring prankster, an attribute which was greatly attractive to the mischievous and impressionable future George IV. One of his most favoured practical jokes would involve pretending to kidnap girls from the streets of London and place coffins outside of their houses with a view to terrifying their servants. His infamy as a gambler was considerable at the time, including his wager that he could consume a large live tomcat in one sitting; however, he did not do so.

He was heavily in debt before marrying, but instead of "marrying into money" as was common for nobility at the time, he married Charlotte Goulding, niece of the infamous Letty Lade, and the daughter of a sedan chair man on 7 June 1792. After his death the next year, when she was eighteen years old, she remarried to Captain Robert Williams of the 3rd Foot Guards, but she eventually "...passed...to the lowest grade of prostitution...and possessed great pugilistic skill". However, she proved a useful and trustworthy assistant as matron of the female prisoners at the Tothill Fields Bridewell.

His sister Caroline (1768–?) was known as "Billingsgate", due to her use of foul language. Henry (1770–1823), his younger brother, was "Cripplegate", due to a physical disfigurement. His youngest brother Augustus (1773–1818) was nicknamed "Newgate", after Newgate Prison in London.

== Sport ==
Barrymore became a recognized sportsman, particularly in running, horse-racing, boxing, and swordsmanship. He bred his own racehorses and rode as his own jockey. He was known for placing huge bets on both these sports and other highly unconventional challenges.

He patronised his own personal bare-knuckle boxer, and his wife also boxed.

== Theatre ==
He attended regularly the theatre, and had built, acted at and ran a costly theatre in Wargrave before his early death.

== Politics ==
He expended money to be one of the two MPs for Heytesbury from 1791, able to contribute to the national debate until his death. (Note: This was a pocket borough by this time without any contested elections between the 1780s until the Reform Act 1832.)

== Military career and early death ==
Barrymore retired to life in the Berkshire Militia, into which he had been commissioned in 1789 and was later promoted Captain, but was accidentally killed at Folkestone on 6 March 1793. When driving a gig his musket discharged while escorting French prisoners of war to Dover.

He was buried on 17 May 1793 in St Mary's Church in Wargrave.

== Aftermath ==
=== Barrymore family estate ===
Lord Barrymore died in perhaps unexpected solvency, with no legitimate son. He had alienated much of his Cork patrimony in 1792, at which time the Buttevant estate passed to Viscount Doneraile and to a Scottish banker, John Anderson.

=== Literary references ===
In the 20th century historic novel Regency Buck by Georgette Heyer, a character remarks tolerantly that "the Barrymores, you know, really cannot be held accountable for their odd manners". In April Lady, however, Heyer, as narrator, states that the earl of Barrymore "generally presided" over the "unsavoury" Beggars Club. She states that he had "introduced the fashionable practice of driving with a small Tiger perched up beside him... but society, with the exception of the Prince Regent... was obstinate in avoiding him." (A Tiger is a reference to the use of diminutive grooms).

== Notes and references ==
Notes

Parliament of Great Britain
Preceded by The Lord Auckland; Michael Angelo Taylor	Member of Parliament for Heytesbury; 1791–1793; With: The Lord Auckland	Succeeded by The Lord Auckland; Charles Rose Ellis
Peerage of Ireland
Preceded by Richard Barry	Earl of Barrymore; 1773–1793	Succeeded by Henry Barry
