= Yeomanry House, Reading =

Yeomanry House
- Reading, Berkshire
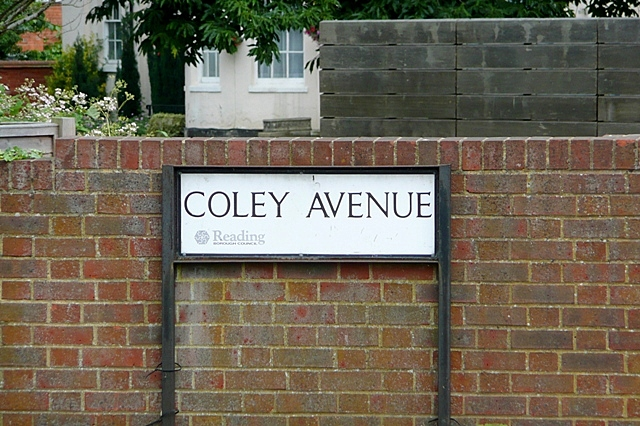
- Yeomanry House (just visible in the background behind the wall)

Site information
- Type: Military headquarters

Location
- Berkshire
- Coordinates: 51.45096°N 0.98177°W

Site history
- Built: Early 19th century
- In use: Early 19th century-Present

Yeomanry House is a former military installation in Reading, Berkshire. It is a Grade II listed building.

== History ==
The house, which was originally known as Castle Hill House, was built in the early 19th century. It became the headquarters of the Berkshire Yeomanry in around 1906. A riding school was built on the site around the same time and evolved to become a drill hall. The regiment was mobilised at the drill hall in August 1914 before being deployed to Gallipoli and, ultimately, to the Western Front. After the war the presence at the drill hall was maintained by 395 (Berkshire Yeomanry) Battery Royal Artillery.

In the 1930s, the divisional ordnance unit for 48th (South Midland) Division was based at the drill hall. Following the defence cuts of 1967, the drill hall was decommissioned. It was demolished in 1995 and that part of the site became the Berkshire Record Office in 2000.
