= George Squibb (auctioneer) =

British auctioneer

George Squibb (c. 1764 – 1831) was a British auctioneer, succeeding his father James, who founded the auction house of Squibb & Son, and working from public rooms in Boyle Street, facing down Savile Row, London, where the elder Squibb had set up in 1778. The grand rooms had been built in the 1730s, at the time Lord Burlington was developing the second phase of his real estate venture at the end of Burlington House gardens; they were extended by Squibb with a top-lit auction room. In 1813 he sold the collection of paintings of the late Duke of San Pietro. Among the country house auctions that fell under his hammer was that of the contents of Streatham Park, sold for Hester Thrale Piozzi in May 1816. Among those associated with Squibb was Michael Bryan, the connoisseur and author of the Dictionary of Painters

When not used as an auction venue, the large room Squibb added to the premises might be temporarily converted to a theatre, as Horace Walpole noted in 1790:

I found Little Burlington Street blocked up by coaches. Lord Barrymore, his sister Lady Caroline, and Mrs. Goodall the actress, were performing the Beaux Stratagem in Squib's auction-room, which his lordship has converted into a theatre.

George Squibb's son Francis succeeded him briefly in the family business, but died prematurely in 1833. The firm's successors were Rushworth, Abbott & Co.
