= Hare Hatch =

Village in Berkshire, England

Coordinates: 51.495089°N 0.843311°W

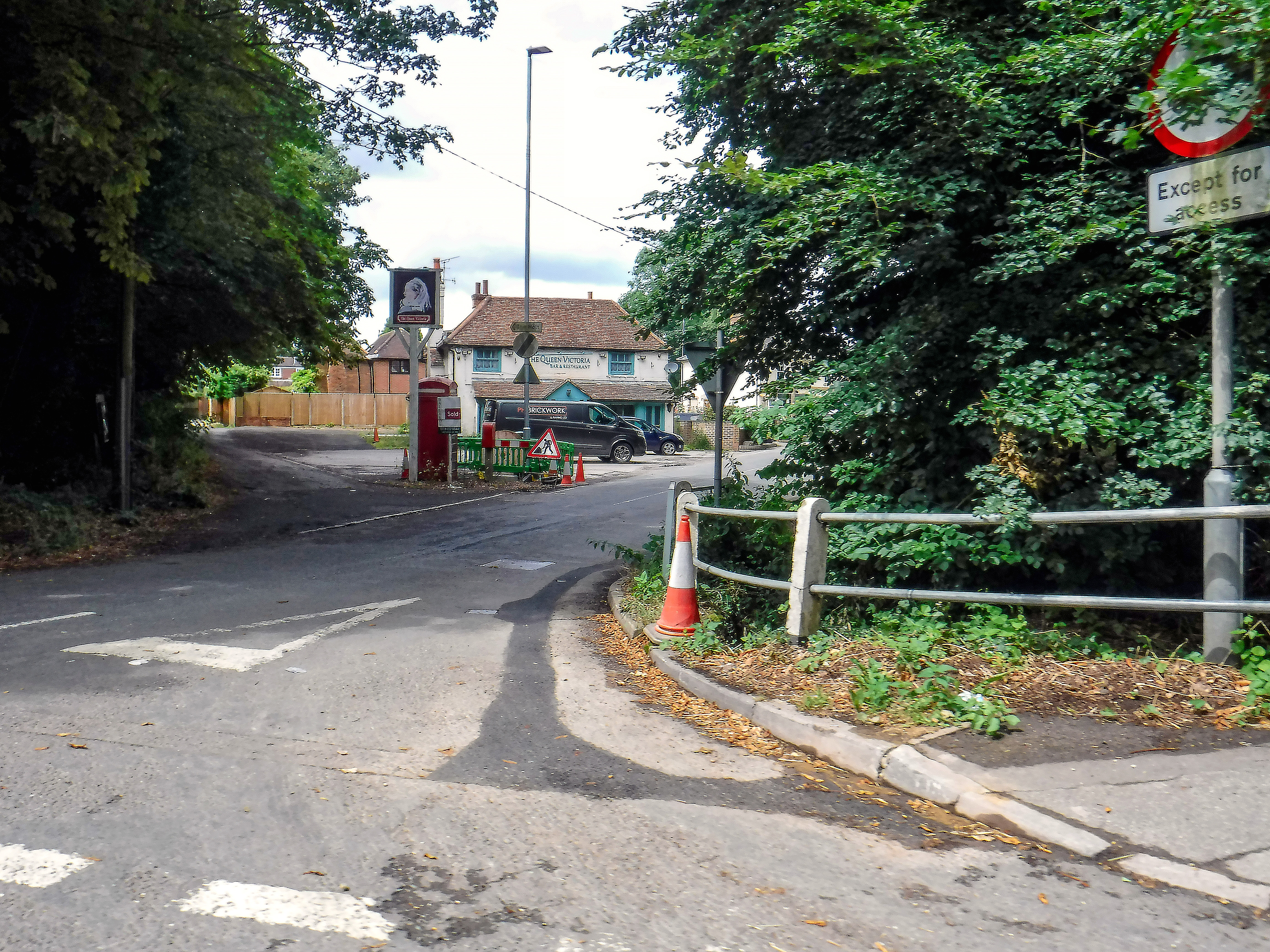
- Blakes Lane

- Location within Berkshire
- OS grid reference: SU806778
- Metropolitan borough: Wokingham
- Metropolitan county: Berkshire
- Region: South East
- Country: England
- Sovereign state: United Kingdom
- Post town: Reading
- Postcode district: RG10
- Dialling code: 0118
- Police: Thames Valley
- Fire: Royal Berkshire
- Ambulance: South Central
- UK Parliament: Berkshire

Hare Hatch is a hamlet in Berkshire, England, and part of the civil parish of Ruscombe. According to the Post Office the majority of the population at the 2011 Census was included in the civil parish of Wargrave. The settlement lies near to the A4 road, and is located approximately 7 miles (11 km) north-east of Reading. It is close to Twyford, and also lies approximately 6 miles (9.7 km) west of Maidenhead.

On 27 April 1927 seven Reading FC fans were killed when their bus crashed in Hare Hatch on the way home from a match against Chelsea.

== Garden centres ==
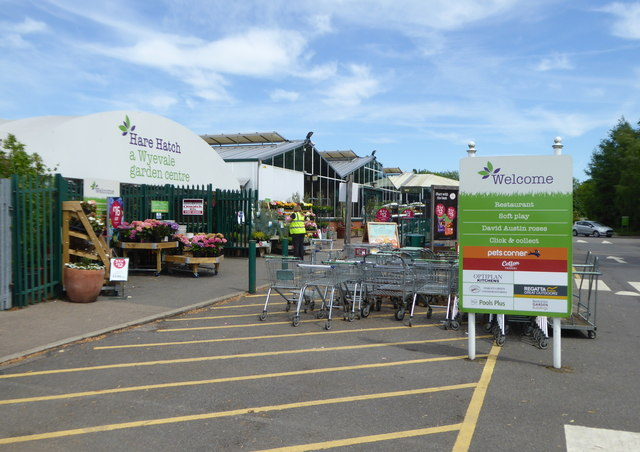
Garden centre

The area is perhaps best known for its three garden centres, two of which are situated directly across the A4 road from each other. The largest of the three garden centres, Hare Hatch Sheeplands, has frequently had difficulties with the local council in arranging planning permission, and issues revolving around the change of use of the existing buildings on site, from a nursery, farm shop and cafe, to mixed retail with a cafe and play area on green belt land. This is still unresolved, and a judicial review of the council's refusal to grant a Certificate of Lawful Use was heard at the High Court in September 2016.

Ultimately, an injunction held in 2017 ruled that the business must comply with the council's requirements, forcing several of the site's concessions to close as of May 2017. In 2018, a judge ruled that Wokingham Borough Council had "offended the court's sense of justice" in their handling of the planning dispute, by waiting for Sheeplands to withdraw their appeal, then promptly prosecuting them. The case has since been ‘indefinitely halted’ as a result of this misconduct by the borough council, effectively closing the case in Sheeplands' favour.
