= 25 (Close Support) Engineer Group =

- Brigade flash
- Active: 1947–1957; 1957–1961; 2014–Present
- Country: United Kingdom
- Branch: British Army
- Role: Military Engineering
- Part of: 3rd (United Kingdom) Division
- Garrison/HQ: Bulford Camp

25 (Close Support) Engineer Group is an engineering group of the British Army's Corps of Royal Engineers.

== History ==
The group was formed in 2014 under the Army 2020 programme.

== Current structure ==
After the Army 2020 Refine, the group now has the following structure (Volunteer units have RHQ location shown);

- Group Headquarters, at Wing Barracks, Bulford Camp
  - 21 Engineer Regiment, Royal Engineers, at Claro Barracks, Ripon
  - 22 Engineer Regiment, Royal Engineers, at Swinton Barracks, Perham Down
  - 26 Engineer Regiment, Royal Engineers, at Swinton Barracks, Perham Down

== Commanding officers ==
The Commanding officers have been:

- 2014–2015: Col. Charles S.E. Thackway
- 2015–2019: Col. Paul B. Nicholson
- 2019–present: Col. Stephen W. Davies
