= 224 Signal Squadron (United Kingdom) =

224 Signal Squadron (Wireless Training) 224 Signal Squadron (Radio Training) 224 Signal Squadron
- Cap badge of the Royal Corps of Signals
- Active: 1959–1980; 2004–2009; 2020–Present
- Country: United Kingdom
- Branch: British Army
- Role: Cyber Protection
- Size: Squadron
- Part of: 13th Signal Regiment
- Garrison/HQ: Azimghur Barracks, Colerne
- Engagements: Operation Telic; Operation Herrick

Insignia
- Tactical Recognition Flash

224 Signal Squadron (Cyber) is a company sized military communications unit of the British Army's Royal Corps of Signals and forms part of the corps' new 13th (Cyber) Signal Regiment. The squadron was originally formed in 1959 as part of the army's wider expansion of the Royal Signals, but disbanded in 1980 after its tasks were taken over by a joint communications training group. In 2020, the squadron was reformed as part of the June 2020 reorganisation of the corps.

== First Formation (1959) ==
In 1959, the Royal Corps of Signals went through a massive reorganisation, the first of its type since 1944. As part of the 1959 reorganisations, led by the 1957 Defence White Paper, the Royal Signals former squadrons were all brought into a 'standard numbering and organisation' system. This system was brought in and was to be modelled on the Royal Artillery and Royal Engineers recent reorganisations. As part of these reorganisations, 224 Signal Squadron (Wireless Training) was formed in Loughborough as the immediate successor to the former 10 Wireless Training Squadron.

In 1961 the squadron was renamed as 224 Signal Squadron (Radio Training), while initially remaining independent, however shortly after this change, the squadron moved into Garats Hay Barracks in Loughborough, which were specially built for the squadron's tasks. The squadron was tasked with providing the radio training in the East Midlands and support to Eastern District. Eventually in March 1976 following the 1975 Defence White Paper, the squadron absorbed 223 Signal Squadron (Radio) without a change of title.

On 1 November 1980 the squadron was disbanded and its tasks taken over by 4 Special Communications Unit. Part of the squadron then became the Communications & Security Group (UK) located at the same barracks. The squadron's lineage though officially ended, was unofficially continued through the Special Projects Agency of the same group. The training section of the group then moved to Chicksands in 1990, and elements moved to RAF Digby. It was this later group that would reform the squadron in 2004.

== Second Formation (2004) ==
On 21 June 2004, 224 Signal Squadron was formed as a joint service sub-unit of the 14th Signal Regiment (Electronic Warfare) and based at RAF Digby, as the successor to the Joint Service Signal Unit. The new squadron became a fully deployable field unit, with the specific role of providing specialist operators, equipment, and enhanced communications to elements of 14 Signal Regiment deployed on operations worldwide (notably Operation Herrick). The squadron on formation comprised around 90 specialist personnel drawn from the British Army (Royal Corps of Signals and Intelligence Corps) and RAF (RAF Signal Service). The squadron also comprised a handful of personnel from the Royal Electrical and Mechanical Engineers (LAD), Royal Logistic Corps, and Adjutant General's Corps.

By 2009, the squadron was again officially disbanded, its size reduced to a troop (equivalent of a platoon), with its personnel moving to the army element of the Joint Signals Intelligence Unit, still based at RAF Digby.

== Third Formation (2020) ==
In 2020, as part of the Army 2020 Refine, it was announced a new dedicated cyber regiment would be formed in the Royal Corps of Signals, though this regiment would be multi-capbadged and joint service unit. This new regiment was formed on the basis of the 15th Signal Regiment based in Colerne, and became known as the 13th Signal Regiment (Cyber), which stood up on 1 June 2020. As part of this reorganisation, which then affected the entire corps, 224 (Cyber Protection Teams) Signal Squadron was reformed and based at Azimghur Barracks, drawing personnel from the cyber teams of 14 Signal Regiment.
