= 1st Signal Regiment (United Kingdom) =

1 Signal Regiment, Royal Signals
- Active: 1905–1992; 1993–Present
- Country: United Kingdom
- Branch: British Army
- Type: Signals
- Size: Regiment; 383 personnel
- Part of: 1st (UK) Division
- Garrison/HQ: Swinton Barracks, Perham Down

1 Signal Regiment is a military communications regiment of the British Army.

== History ==
The regiment's antecedents date to the formation of the 1st Division, Telegraph Battalion, Royal Engineers, in 1905. From 1905 to 1960, the regiment title changed several times, for example, from 1st Divisional Signal Company to 1st Divisional Signal Regiment. As a result of the 1957 Defence White Paper, the regiment was re-titled as 1st Division Headquarters and Signal Regiment, and moved to Verden in 1978. In 1993, as a result of the Options for Change force reductions, 1st Armoured Division disbanded, reforming as HQ Lower Saxony District.

After the Army 2020 Refine reforms the regiment was titled as 1 Signal Regiment, and fell under operational command of 11th Signal Brigade. Under Army 2020 Refine, the regiment will support the 20th Armoured Infantry Brigade as a close support signal communications regiment. By 2025, the regiment will move from its current location at MOD Stafford to Swinton Barracks in Perham Down, thereby co-locating with the remainder of the regular units of 7th Signal Group.

== Organisation ==
The Regiment is currently based at Perham Down, Wiltshire.

As of 2020, after its conversion to a "armoured infantry brigade signals" unit, the regiment's squadron include:

- 200 (Armoured) Signal Squadron
- 246 Gurkha Signal Squadron
- Support Squadron

== Alliances ==
- Germany – Panzergrenadier Division Signal Regiment Fernmeldebataillon 1
- Canada – 1st Canadian Signal Regiment
