= 21st Signal Regiment (Electronic Warfare) =

British Army regiment

21 Signal Regiment (Electronic Warfare)
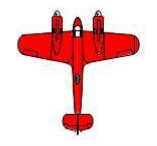
- 21 Signal Regiment’s emblem is the Red Beaufighter
- Active: 5 March 1943 – 1954 (as 12th (Air Formations) Signals) 1954 – 1958 (as 83 Group (12) Air Formation Signal Regiment); 1958 – 1959 (as 12th Air Formation Signal Regiment); 1959 – 1971 (as 21st Signal Regiment (Air Formation)); 1971 – 2014 (as 21 Signal Regiment; 2014 – 2022 (as 21 Signal Regiment) 2022 – current (as 21 Signal Regiment (Electronic Warfare))
- Country: United Kingdom
- Branch: British Army
- Type: Military Communications
- Role: Electronic Warfare and Signals Intelligence (EWSI)
- Size: Regiment; 340 personnel (2020)
- Part of: Cyber and Electro Magnetic Activities Effects Group
- Garrison/HQ: Azimghur Barracks, Colerne, Wiltshire – to move to Imjin Barracks, Innsworth NB 2028

Insignia
- Cap Badge

- Tactical Recognition Flash

21 Signal Regiment (Electronic Warfare) is an electronic warfare and signals intelligence regiment of the Royal Corps of Signals within the British Army. The regiment was, until the initial Army 2020 reforms, the only signal regiment to support the Royal Air Force.

== History ==
The regiment can trace its roots to the 12th (Air Formations) Signals formed in 1943, in Kirkburton, England, for the purpose of supporting the Second Tactical Air Force in the forthcoming invasion of France on D-Day.

The regiment was divided into two companies in 1944 upon moving into Normandy, France;

- 2nd Tactical Air Force (Main) Company
- 2nd Tactical Air Force (Reserve) Company.

At the end of the Second World War, the regiment's two companies were stationed at Bad Eilsen and Bueckeburg in Western Germany, supporting the Royal Air Force's Second Tactical Air Force (2TAF).

From 1952 to 1958, the unit supported the West Germany-based No. 83 Group RAF.

In 1954, the regiment expanded to become 83 Group (12) Air Formation Signal Regiment.

In 1958, No. 83 Group RAF was disbanded, and the regiment was renamed 12th Air Formation Signal Regiment, before being redesignated in 1959 as 21st Signal Regiment (Air Formation).

In July 1971, the regiment was re-designated as 21 Signal Regiment (Air Support).

From 1971 until 1992, the regiment was part of the 4 Signal Group supporting the British Army of the Rhine and was based at RAF Wildenrath. It also took on the additional role of providing communication links for the RAF Germany Harrier Force.

After the Options for Change restructuring in 1990, the regiment moved from Laarbuch to Azimghur Barracks, Colerne, where it remains presently.

During Operation Telic in Iraq, the regiment provided ground to air tactical communications to aircraft within RAF Support Helicopter Force, which operated under the command of JHC (and consisted of Puma, Merlin and Chinook helicopters as well as around 1,100 personnel).

In 2011, 21st Signal Regiment (Air Support) deployed to Afghanistan for a 6 month operational tour of duty on Operation Herrick. Members of 214 Signal Squadron supported 3 Commando Brigade, and subsequently 20 Armoured Brigade, by delivering communications to the front line, as well as installing equipment that allowed tactical commanders to direct their troops, target insurgents, and support helicopter operations including casualty evacuation (CASEVAC).

Elements of 21st Signal Regiment (Air Support) also deployed to Afghanistan in October 2013, and operated within Helmand, Kandahar and Kabul.

As part of the initial Army 2020 reforms, the regiment was no longer designated as an Air Support Signal Regiment and 244 (now carrying the Air Support designation) and 214 Signal Squadrons were transferred to 30 Signal Regiment and 2 Signal Regiment respectively.

After the initial Army 2020 reforms, the regiment was assigned as part of 7th Signal Group within 11th Signal Brigade and Headquarters West Midlands, and was classified as a Multi-Role Signal Regiment.

Following further changes under Army 2020 Refine, from 2018 to 2022 the regiment supported 1st Armoured Infantry Brigade as the Brigade transitioned to become the Army’s first STRIKE Brigade (1st Deep Recce Strike Brigade).

== Future ==
In 2021, it was announced that under the Army's Future Soldier programme, the regiment would re-role to become the Army's second dedicated Electronic Warfare and Signals Intelligence (EWSI) unit.

In 2024, 21 Signal Regiment joined the newly formed Cyber and Electro Magnetic Activities (CEMA) Effects Group, within Field Army Troops. The Group commands the Army’s two Electronic Warfare and Signals Intelligence (EWSI) regiments, 21 and 14 Signal Regiments, as well as the cyber regiment, 13 Signal Regiment.

21 Signal Regiment is set to move from Azimghur Barracks, Colerne to Imjin Barracks, Innsworth NB (not before) 2028, to be based alongside 14 Signal Regiment, the British Army's only other Electronic Warfare and Signals Intelligence regiment.

== Organisation ==
The current organisation of the regiment is:

- Regimental Headquarters, at Azimghur Barracks, Colerne
- 234 Signal Squadron
- 237 Signal Squadron
- 255 Signal Squadron

Previously, the regiment included 204 Signal Squadron, before the squadron was disbanded in 2018, with personnel bolstering the other squadrons throughout 21 Sig Regt.

== Freedoms ==
Bath – 21 Signal Regiment was granted Freedom of the City in 2011.
