= Corunna Barracks =

Military installation in Ludgershall, Wiltshire, England

- Ludgershall
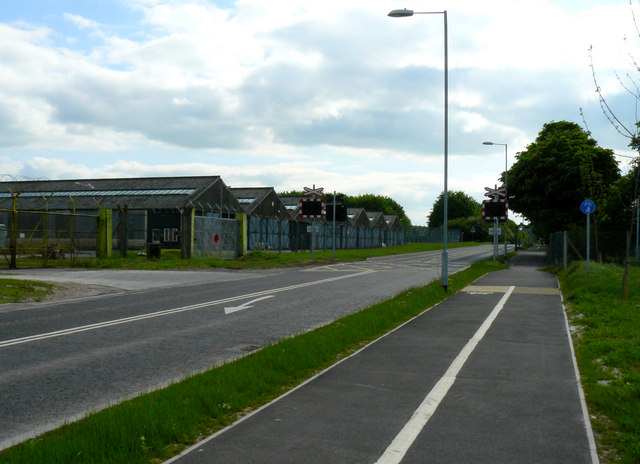
- Former military buildings in May 2008

Site information
- Type: Barracks
- Owner: Ministry of Defence
- Operator: British Army

Location
- Location within Wiltshire
- Coordinates: 51.2531°N 1.6344°W

Site history
- Built: 1939
- Built for: War Office
- In use: 1939–2005

Corunna Barracks was a military installation in Ludgershall, Wiltshire, England.

== History ==
The site was originally a Romano-British cemetery dating back to the 4th century A.D.

During the Second World War, Army depots were built to the north and south of Tidworth Road, and the War Office transferred the Army Medical Store to a site west of the railway station around that time. The US Army prepared vehicles for the invasion of Europe at the depot in 1943. The site was then home to the Central Vehicle Depot of the British Army until the 1970s.

The installation was renamed Corunna Barracks in 2001, when 26 Engineer Regiment, Royal Engineers, relocated from Corunna Barracks in Iserlohn in Germany, where the regiment had been based for over 30 years. The regiment was engaged in land mine clearance operations in Helmand Province in Afghanistan in 2007, before moving to Swinton Barracks at Perham Down.

In 2015, the barracks were demolished to make way for military housing.
