= 11th Signal and West Midlands Brigade =

- Active: 1967–2024
- Country: United Kingdom
- Branch: British Army
- Type: Communications and Regional Point of Command
- Size: Brigade
- Part of: 3rd UK Division
- Garrison/HQ: Venning Barracks, Donnington, Shropshire, England.

The 11th Signal and West Midlands Brigade was a signal formation of the British Army's 3rd UK Division. By November 2024, it had been disbanded, with its sub-units resubordinated.

== History ==
The brigade was formed as 11th Signal Group in Liverpool in 1967. It became 11th Signal Brigade in 1982 and was redesignated 11th (ARRC) Signal Brigade in 1992 and reverted to 11th Signal Brigade in 1997. In November 2014, in accordance with the Army 2020 reorganisation, 11th Signal Brigade amalgamated with 143 (West Midlands) Brigade to create a new formation, based at Venning Barracks in Donnington, named 11th Signal and West Midlands Brigade, with an additional role as a regional brigade for army regular and reserve units in the West Midlands counties. A formation parade took place at Donnington on 15 November 2014.

== Role ==
One of the brigade's responsibilities, as Regional Point of Command West Midlands, was to provide administrative support for around 8,000 Army personnel who were based in the West Midlands region, as well as forming a vital link between the Army and its local communities. The brigade had five Regular Army signal regiments and five Army Reserve signal regiments. In addition, it has command responsibilities for the Army Cadet Forces and some of the Army Reserve units in the region.

== Structure ==
=== 11th Signal Brigade ===
The operational structure of the brigade on disbandment, was:

- 10th Signal Regiment, Royal Corps of Signals, at Basil Hill Barracks, Corsham
  - 81 Signal Squadron, in Corsham (Army Reserve)
- 32nd (Scottish) Signal Regiment, Royal Corps of Signals, HQ in Glasgow (Army Reserve – Apps/Data support, paired with 16 Signal Regiment in 1 (UK) Signal Brigade)
- 39th (Skinners) Signal Regiment, Royal Corps of Signals, HQ in Bristol (Army Reserve – Apps/Data support, paired with 22 Signal Regiment in 1 (UK) Signal Brigade)
- 7 Signal Group, at Venning Barracks, Donnington (to move to Kiwi Barracks, Bulford)
  - 1st Signal Regiment, Royal Corps of Signals, at Beacon Barracks, Stafford (to move to Swinton Barracks, Perham Down to support 20th Armoured Brigade Combat Team)
  - 15th Signal Regiment, Royal Corps of Signals, at Blandford Camp (to move to Swinton Barracks, Perham Down to support 12th Armoured Brigade Combat Team)
  - 21st Signal Regiment, Royal Corps of Signals, at Azimghur Barracks, Colerne (to move to Catterick Garrison in 2020/21 to provide support to the 3rd Deep Reconnaissance Strike Brigade)
  - 71st (City of London) Yeomanry Signal Regiment, Royal Corps of Signals, HQ in Bexleyheath (Army Reserve – Paired with 3 Signal Regiment under 3 (UK) Division)

== See also ==
- Units of the Royal Corps of Signals
