= 21 Engineer Regiment (United Kingdom) =

- Active: 1949–1958; 1961–1992; 1993–present
- Country: United Kingdom
- Branch: British Army
- Type: Regiment
- Role: Close Support Engineers
- Size: Four squadrons 629 personnel
- Part of: 8th Engineer Brigade: 25 (Close Support) Engineer Group
- Garrison/HQ: Claro Barracks
- Engagements: Northern Ireland; Gulf War; Operation Telic; Operation Herrick
- Website: 21 Engr Regt RE

21 Engineer Regiment is a regiment of the British Army's Royal Engineers. It is currently based at Claro Barracks, Ripon, North Yorkshire.

21 Engineer Regiment will move from Claro Barracks to Marne Barracks, Catterick in 2025.

== History ==
21 Engineer Regiment was first formed in 1949 at Holzminden to fulfill 7th Armoured Division engineer support requirements as the 21st Field Regiment. In 1958, the regiment was split as the 7th Armoured Division was disbanded and became the new 5th Infantry Division. As a result of the change, the regiment was broken up and became the new 21st Engineer Regiment, the divisional engineer regiment for the 1st Armoured Division. In 1969, the regiment was reformed as 21 Engineer Regiment. In 1978, the regiment was renamed to 1st Armoured Division Engineer Regiment. In 1992, as a result of the Options for Change, the division, along with the regiment, were disbanded, but later reformed in 1993. The regiment remained in Germany until 2008 when it moved to Ripon.

15 Field Support Squadron of 21 Engineer Regiment were the first troops to use the Talisman suite of counter-IED tools operationally in Afghanistan, in 2010. In 25 October 2013, the British Army had 18 Honeywell RQ-16 T-Hawk UAVs in service as part of the Talisman C-IED suite.

Under Army 2020, the regiment joined the 12 (Force Support) Engineer Group. As a result of the Better Defence Estate strategy, and Army 2020 Refine, the regiment will move to Marne Barracks, Catterick and gain a Mechanised Infantry Vehicle variant.

== Structure ==
Reportedly after the Army 2020 reforms:

- 21 Engineer Regiment, in Ripon
  - 7 Headquarters and Support Squadron
  - 1 Field Squadron
  - 4 Field Squadron
- 23 Amphibious Engineer Squadron, Royal Engineers, based at Talbot Barracks Sennelager, Germany
- REME Light Aid Detachment
