= 608 Signal Troop (United Kingdom) =

- 608 Sig Tp
- Cap badge of the Royal Corps of Signals
- Active: 1959–1965; 1965–2002?
- Country: United Kingdom
- Branch: British Army: Royal Corps of Signals
- Role: Military Communications
- Size: Troop
- Part of: Commander Communications, British Army of the Rhine
- Garrison/HQ: Viersen, later MOD Ashchurch

608 Signal Troop was a special communications unit of the British Army's Royal Corps of Signals and served as part of the British Army of the Rhine before being disbanded after 2001.

== First Formation (1959) ==
In 1959, the Royal Corps of Signals went through a massive reorganisation, the first of its type since 1944 during that year's reorganisations. As part of the 1957 Defence White Paper, all former squadrons were all brought into a 'standard numbering and organisation' system. This system was brought in and was to be modelled on the Royal Artillery and Royal Engineers recent reorganisations.

As part of this number reorganisation, the old 1 Signal Equipment Troop in Viersen was converted to 608 Signal Troop (Equipment), later (British Army of the Rhine). In June 1965 this troop was disbanded and its personnel transferred to the 15th Advanced Base Ordnance Depot, a unit of the Royal Army Ordnance Corps, located halfway between Viersen and 614 Signal Troop at RAF Brüggen.

== Second Formation (1965) ==
Just a few months after the former 608 signal troop was disbanded, 614 Signal Troop was disbanded and subsequently re-raised as 608 Signal Troop (Cipher Equipment). This time, the troop was subordinated to the 15th ABOD, and provided the Royal Corps of Signals inspection teams. Unlike other signal troops, 608 troop maintained its own workshop.

In 1989, the troop reported to Commander Communications, British Army of the Rhine and was commanded by Major A. G. Morgan. In 1989 the troop's name was again altered, to become 608 Signal Troop (SSIT) providing support solutions improvement teams (SSITs) to all the locations controlled by the BAOR.

In 1992, following the disbandment of the 4th Signal Group, the troop remained independent until it joined the new formed 1st (United Kingdom) Signal Brigade in 1997. As a result of the Options for Change, the troop was renamed to become 608 Signal Troop (Systems Support & Inspection Team), still providing equipment for the British forces still based in Germany.

In 1995 when the Viersen location was shut down, the troop was withdrawn to Saint Barbara's Barracks at Ashchurch and by 2001 was renamed simply as 608 Signal Troop. The remainder of the history of the troop after 2001 is unknown, it is possible it was disbanded in 2002.
