= 4th Signal Group (United Kingdom) =

British Army group

- Active: 1 October 1969 - 1992
- Country: United Kingdom
- Branch: Army
- Type: Signals
- Role: Military Communications
- Size: Group
- Part of: British Army of the Rhine
- Garrison/HQ: JHQ Rheindahlen

The 4th Signal Group was a group sized unit of the Royal Corps of Signals within the British Army that supported the British Army of the Rhine. The group's main job was to supervise all of the static communications used by the British Forces in Germany. It supported the British Army of the Rhine and 2nd Allied Tactical Air Force for just under 30 years.

== History ==
The 4th Signal Group was originally formed in 1969 after major reforms to the British Army, the group was created from the original HQ Chief Air Formation Signals Branch, British Army of the Rhine. The group was interestingly created as a result of an agreement between the Royal Air Force and British Army. The army agreed to take control of the signals between the British Army of the Rhine and the 2nd Tactical Air Force of the RAF. The group's first HQ was at JHQ Rheindahlen where it commanded the 16th Signal Regiment (Supported BAOR), 21st Signal Regiment (Supported 2nd TAF), and Signals Works Service Troops (Static Rear Communications). Because there was no war with the Soviet Union the group never saw active service. In 1992 as a result of the Options for Change the group was disbanded and in its place the new Headquarters Communications Branch, British Army of the Rhine was created. In 1990 during Operation Granby, the 16th Signal Regiment, making is the only regiment of the entire group to deploy during its entire existence,

== Units ==
Structure of the group in 1969;

- 16th Signal Regiment
- 21st Signal Regiment
- Signals Works Service Troops (Note: Made of ex-Wehrmacht personnel)

Structure of the group in 1989:

- 4th Signal Group (British Army of the Rhine), HQ at Joint Headquarters, Rheindahlen
  - 13th Signal Regiment (Radio), Royal Corps of Signals, at Mercury Barracks, Birgelen (Signals Intelligence unit)
    - No. 3 Signal Squadron, at RAF Gatow, West Berlin
  - 16th Signal Regiment (British Army of the Rhine), Royal Corps of Signals, at Bradbury Barracks, Krefeld
    - No. 1 Signal Squadron, at Joint Headquarters, Rheindahlen
    - No. 4 Signal Squadron, at Joint Headquarters, Rheindahlen
  - 21st Signal Regiment (Air Support), Royal Corps of Signals, at RAF Wildenrath (tasked with supporting RAF Germany and 2nd Allied Tactical Air Force)
  - 608 Signal Troop (Cipher Equipment), Royal Corps of Signals, in Viersen
  - Signal Works Service Troop, Royal Corps of Signals
