= 3rd (UK) Division Signal Regiment =

British Army regiment

3rd Signal Regiment
- Active: 1885–1947; 1951–Present
- Country: United Kingdom
- Branch: Army
- Type: Signals
- Role: Military Communications
- Size: Regiment; 480 personnel
- Part of: 7th Signals Group
- Garrison/HQ: Bulford

3rd (UK) Division Signal Regiment is a regiment of the Royal Corps of Signals within the British Army. The regiment is based at Bulford.

== History ==
The regiment can trace its history back to "The Telegraph Battalion, Royal Engineers". In 1903, it was designated as the 'telegraph battalion' for 3rd Division. In 1945, the regiment was re-titled as the "3rd Infantry Division Signal Regiment".

In 1947 upon returning from British Palestine the regiment disbanded, but re-formed in 1951 as part of the new Army Strategic Command and later deployed during the Suez Crisis in 1956. After further re-organisation, the regiment had three squadrons under its command, namely, 202 squadron, 206 squadron and 222 squadron.

In early 1993, as a result of Options for Change, the regiment moved to Bulford where it was re-titled as "3rd (UK) Division Headquarters and Signal Regiment".

As part of the Future Soldier reforms, the regiment has fallen under the command of the 7th Signals Group.

== Organisation ==
The current organisation of the regiment is:

- Regimental Headquarters, at Kiwi Barracks, Bulford Garrison
- 202 Signal Squadron (High Readiness, 5 days notice)
- 228 Signal Squadron (Armoured HQ support)
- 249 (Gurkha) Signal Squadron (HQ support)
- Support (The Somme) Squadron

== Alliances and affiliations ==
United Kingdom - Oxford University Officers' Training Corps

United Kingdom - Southampton University Officers' Training Corps
