= 13th Signal Regiment (United Kingdom) =

Specialist signals unit of the Royal Corps of Signals

- Active: 1934–1995; 2020–present
- Country: United Kingdom
- Branch: British Army
- Role: Defensive Cyber Operations
- Size: Regiment (Note: In the Royal Corps of Signals, a 'Regiment' is equivalent to a battalion in the Infantry) ("nearly 250 personnel")
- Part of: Cyber and Electro Magnetic Activities Effects Group
- Garrison/HQ: Blandford Camp – moving to MoD Corsham NB 2028

Insignia
- Tactical Recognition Flash

- Regimental Badge

13 Signal Regiment is a signal regiment of the Royal Corps of Signals within the British Army.

Originally formed in 1934, the regiment had a long history of service before being disbanded in 1994, following the initial Options for Change reforms.

The regiment was reformed in June 2020, to provide the Army's first dedicated cyber regiment aimed at protecting Ministry of Defence networks in the UK and overseas.

13 Signal Regiment is set to move from their current base at Blandford Camp to Basil Hill Barracks, MoD Corsham, but not before 2028.

== History ==
During the First World War, the Wireless Observation Groups of the Corps of Royal Engineers were proven to be successful. As a result, a Corps of Signals was planned to be formed in 1917, however its formation was delayed until 1920.

The 4th Wireless Signal Company (War Office Signals) was formed in 1934 at Aldershot Garrison to provide signal intelligence activities under the command of the War Office.

In 1938, the company was re-titled as No. 2 Company, General Headquarters Signals. The company later expanded its responsibility to provide secure communications for the army.

In September 1939, the unit was deployed to France as part of the British Expeditionary Force. It was later evacuated at Dunkirk and renamed as the 1st Special Wireless Group on 18 July 1940. Following a short re-organisation, the group was deployed to the Middle East under the command of the 2nd Special Wireless Group.

During the Cold War years, the group was based in Minden and re-titled as the 1st Special Wireless Regiment. In August 1946, the regiment moved to Peterborough Barracks and then moved again in 1950 to Nelson Barracks in Münster. By 1953, the regiment was moved as a result of an analysis of Soviet Forces in East Germany and by 1955, a brand new set of barracks was constructed in Wassenberg-Rothenbach, near Birgelen, on the German-Dutch Border. In 1959, as a result of the 1957 Defence White Paper reforms, the regiment was further renamed as 13th Signal Regiment (Radio).

In 1994, the regiment was disbanded as part of the Options for Change reforms.

As a result of the Army 2020 Refine reforms, the regiment was stood up on 1 June 2020 under the command of 1st Signal Brigade.

== Future ==
In 2021, it was announced that under the Army's Future Soldier reforms programme, the regiment would be re-organised to form part of the Cyber and Electro Magnetic Activities (CEMA) Effects Group alongside 14 Signal Regiment and 21 Signal Regiment, the Army's Electronic Warfare units.

13 Signal Regiment is set to move from their current headquarters at Blandford Camp to Basil Hill Barracks, MoD Corsham NB (not before) 2028.

== Organisation ==
The current organisation of the regiment is:

- Regimental Headquarters, at Blandford Camp
- 224 (Cyber Protection Teams) Signal Squadron
- 233 (Global Communication Networks) Signal Squadron, at Basil Hill Barracks, MoD Corsham
  - 605 (Army HQ ICS) Signal Troop, at Marlborough Lines, Andover
- 259 (Global Information Systems) Signal Squadron
  - Combat Information Systems (CIS) Trails and Development Unit (CISTDU)
- Specialist Group Information Services (SGIS)

== See also ==
- Units of the Royal Corps of Signals

== Sources ==
- Lord, Cliff, and Graham Watson. The Royal Corps of Signals Unit Histories of the Corps (1920-2001) and Its Antecedents. Helion and Company, 2003. ISBN 1874622922
- "Royal Signals". www.army.mod.uk. Retrieved 2019-10-20.
- Watson, Graham E. and Rinaldi, Richard A. The British Army in Germany (BAOR and After): An Organisational History 1947-2004 Tiger Lily Publications LLC 2005. ISBN 0-9720296-9-9
