= Berlin Infantry Brigade =

British army garrison 1953–1994

- Active: October 1953–1994
- Country: United Kingdom
- Branch: British Army
- Type: District Command
- Garrison/HQ: Berlin

The Berlin Infantry Brigade was a British Army brigade-sized garrison based in West Berlin during the Cold War. After the end of World War II, under the conditions of the Yalta and Potsdam agreements, the Allied forces occupied West Berlin. This occupation lasted throughout the Cold War. The French Army also had units in West Berlin, called the French Forces in Berlin and the US Army's unit in West Berlin was the Berlin Brigade. The Soviet Army unit in East Berlin was the 6th Separate Guards Motor Rifle Brigade.

== History ==
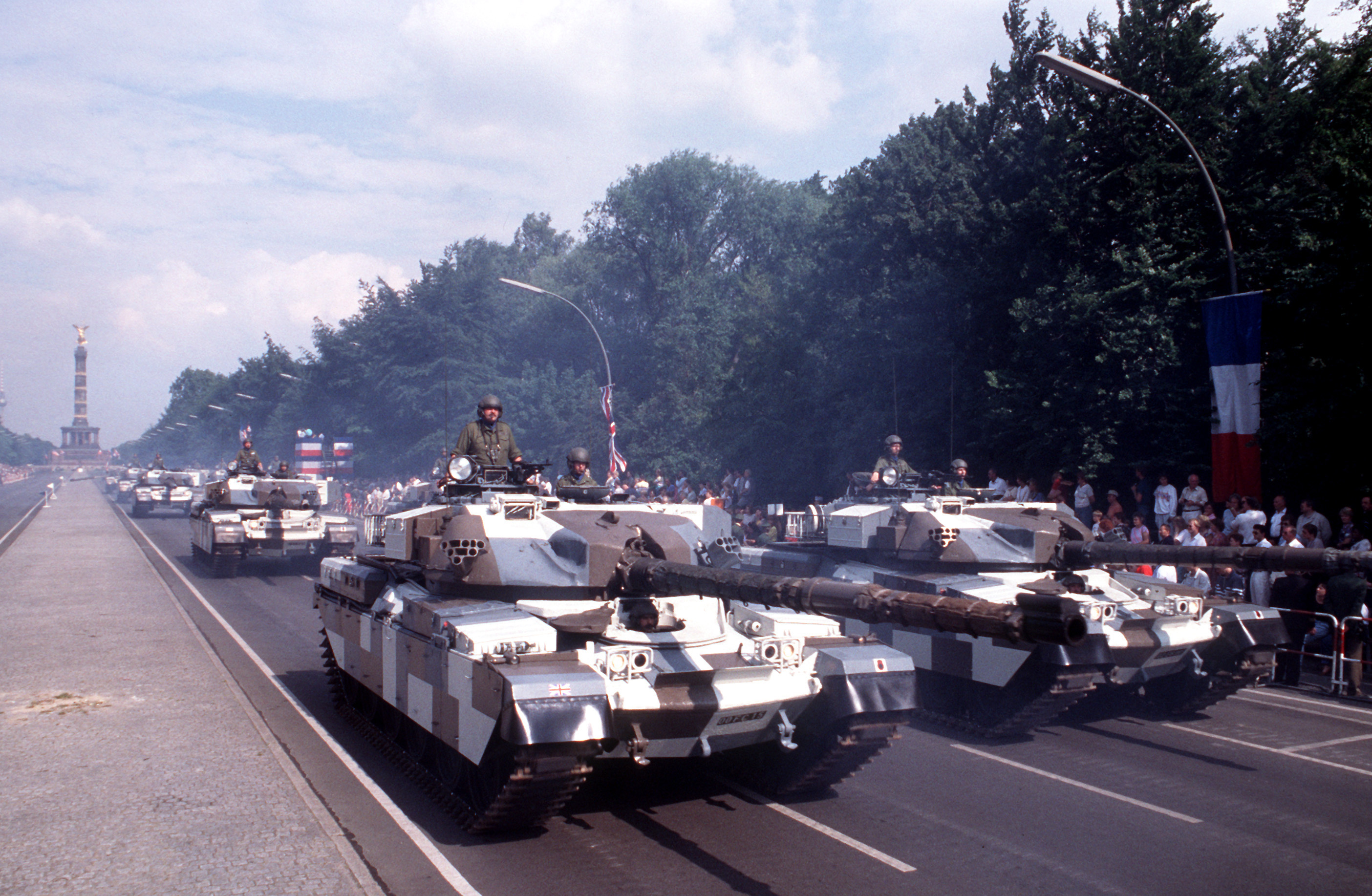
British Army Chieftain tanks of the Berlin armoured squadron, taking part in the Allied Forces Day parade in June 1989

The Berlin Infantry Brigade was formed in October 1953 out of the force called "Area Troops Berlin" and consisted of some 3,100 men in three infantry battalions, an armoured squadron, and a number of support units. Its shoulder sleeve insignia was a red circle over a black background with the word Berlin in red on a black background running around the top. It was not initially part of the British Army of the Rhine despite being based in Germany. However, by the mid-1980s, the brigade is recorded to have become part of the BAOR, being its second major component after I (BR) Corps.

In 1946 the military postal address for Berlin-based British troops was 'BAOR 2' but when the BFPO indication number was introduced in 1951 to was changed to 'BFPO 45' and remained its address until the British troops were withdrawn from Berlin in 1994.

The three infantry battalions and armoured squadron assigned to Berlin were rotated regularly; the single armoured squadron was detached from an armoured regiment assigned to I (BR) Corps. The infantry battalions were rotated every two years. All other units were permanently based in Berlin.

== Structure ==
At the time when the Berlin Wall fell (9 November 1989), the operational structure of the British forces in Berlin was as follows:

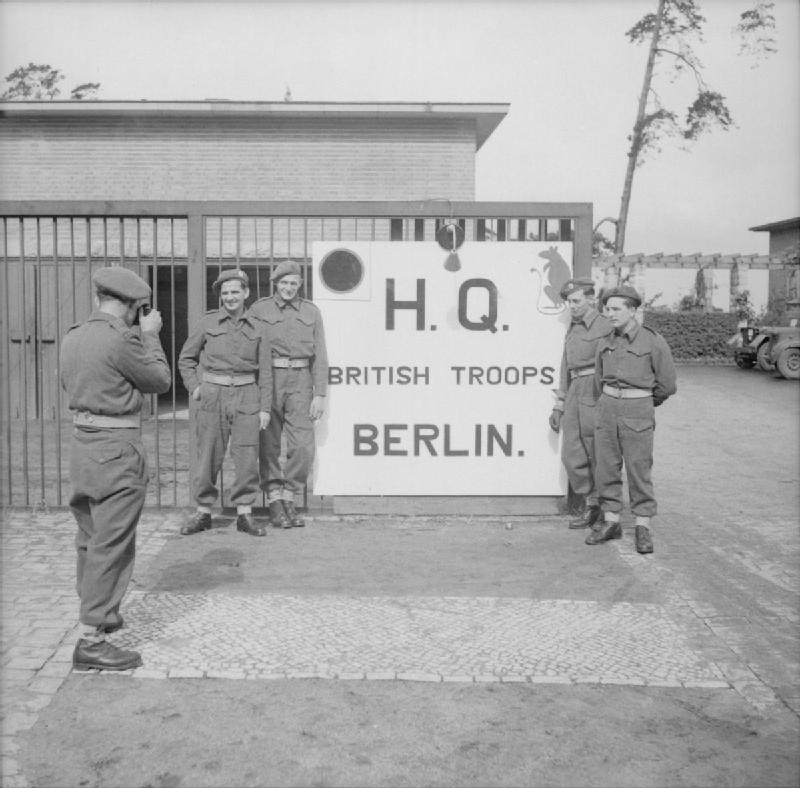
- British troops photographed at their headquarters in Berlin.
  HQ Berlin
  - Berlin Infantry Brigade
    - Berlin Infantry Brigade HQ & (29th) Signal Regiment, Royal Signals
    - 1st Btn, King's Regiment, Wavell Barracks, (replaced by 1st Btn, Irish Guards December 1989)
    - 1st Btn, The Light Infantry, Brooke Barracks
    - 1st Btn, Royal Welch Fusiliers, Montgomery Barracks
    - C Squadron, 14th/20th King's Hussars, Smuts Barracks, (14x Chieftain)
    - 6 Troop, 46 (Talavera) Air Defence Battery, 2 Field Regiment, Royal Artillery, (12x Javelin)
    - 38 (Berlin) Field Squadron, Royal Engineers Smuts Barracks
    - Detachment, Special Projects Team (OP FRESH AIR) Royal Engineers RAF Gatow
    - Detachment, 164 Railway Operations Company, Royal Engineers
    - Berlin Postal & Courier Troop, Royal Engineers
  - 2nd Regiment, Royal Military Police
    - 246 (Berlin) Provost Company, Royal Military Police, in Helmstedt, mans Checkpoint Alpha
    - 247 (Berlin) Provost Company, Royal Military Police, mans Checkpoint Bravo and Checkpoint Charlie
    - 248 German Security Unit, support unit with German personnel
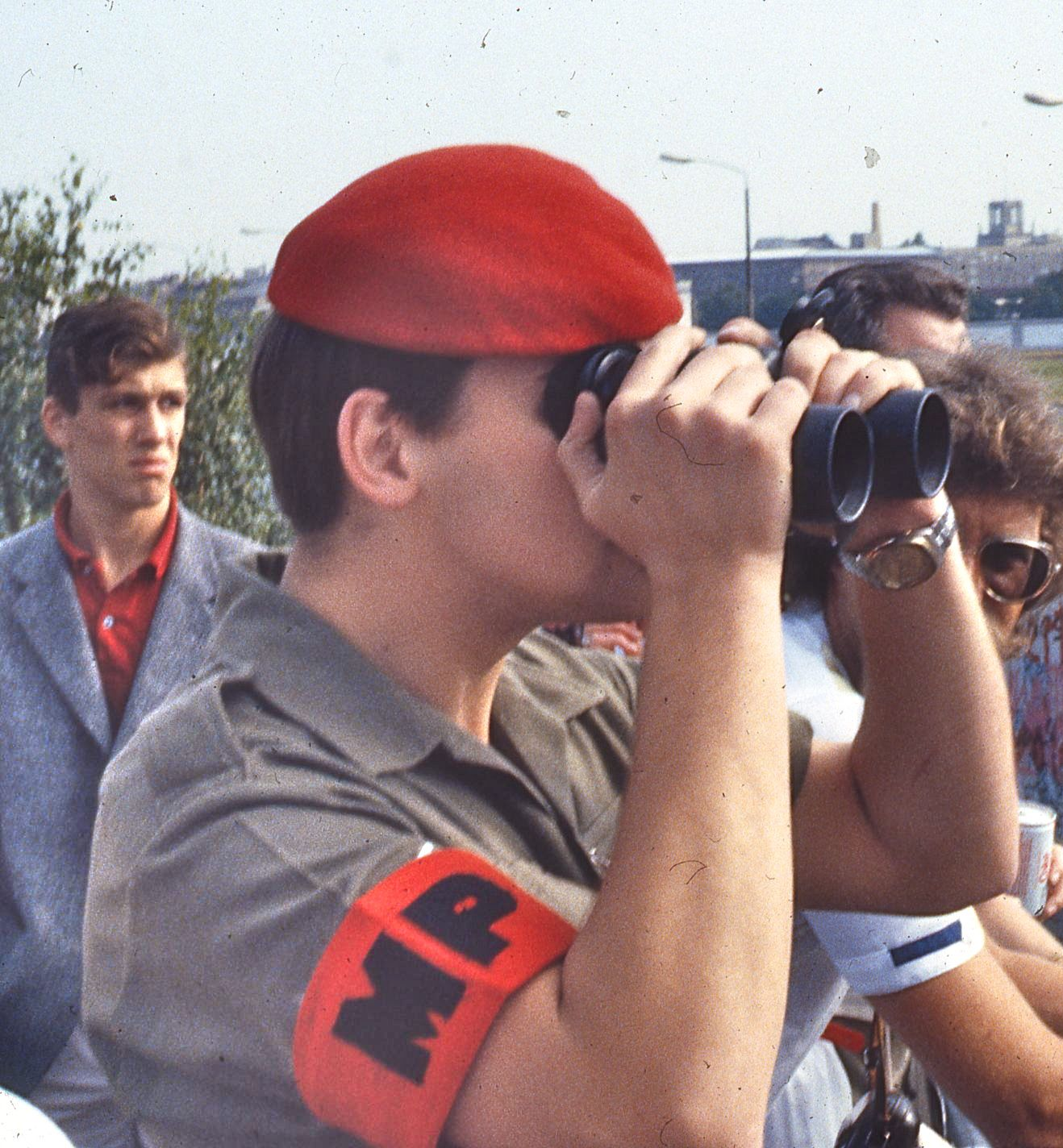
      British military police officer from the 247 Provost Company looks across Berlin Wall with field glasses, 1984
  - 3 Squadron, 13 Signal Regiment (Radio), Royal Signals, Signals Intelligence at RAF Gatow & Olympic Stadium
  - 3 Intelligence and Security Company, Intelligence Corps
  - 7 Flight AAC, RAF Gatow, (4x Gazelle AH.1)
  - Royal Air Force Gatow Station Flight, (2x Chipmunk T10)
  - No. 26 Signals Unit, Royal Air Force, (Signals intelligence at RAF Gatow and Teufelsberg
  - British Military Hospital Berlin
    - 2 Field Sanitation Section
    - 50 British Red Cross Convalescent Home
    - 194 Field Dental Centre
  - 62 Transport & Movements Squadron, Royal Corps of Transport
  - Movement Control Office (MCO) Gatow
  - 14 (Berlin) Field Workshop, Royal Electrical and Mechanical Engineers, Alexander Barracks
  - Berlin Ordnance Company, Royal Army Ordnance Corps
  - Ordnance & Ammunition Depot, Royal Army Ordnance Corps
  - 93 Section Special Investigation Branch, Royal Military Police
  - 31 Quartering and Barracks Office, Royal Army Ordnance Corps
  - 504th Commander Royal Army Service Corps (CRASC) (Overseas Deployment Training)
  - Detachment, 2 Independent Petrol Platoon, Royal Army Ordnance Corps
  - 121 Barracks Stores, Royal Army Ordnance Corps
  - 122 Barracks Stores, Royal Army Ordnance Corps
  - 131 Detail Issue Depot, Royal Army Ordnance Corps
  - 3 Station Maintenance Section, Royal Army Ordnance Corps
  - District Depot Railways Berlin - Lines of Communication
  - Railway Transport Officer Station Spandau
  - Railway Transport Officer Station Grunewald
  - Railway Transport Officer Station Charlottenburg
  - BRIXMIS, British Commanders'-in-Chief Mission to Soviet Forces in Germany administered by Berlin Bde HQ

Under the treaties that enabled the German reunification, all non-German military forces were required to leave Berlin. Therefore, the brigade was reduced to two battalions in 1992, then further reduced in 1993 to a single battalion. Finally Berlin Infantry Brigade was officially disbanded in September 1994 and its troops moved to the United Kingdom or British Forces Germany garrisons.

Different names of the Berlin Infantry Brigade from 1945 to 1994:
| Month, Year | Name |
|---|---|
| November 1946 - | British Troops Berlin |
| February 1949 - | Area Troops Berlin |
| October 1953 - | Berlin Infantry Brigade Group |
| December 1963 - | Berlin Infantry Brigade |
| April 1977 - | Berlin Field Force |
| January 1981 – September 1994 | Berlin Infantry Brigade |

== External links and references ==
- 248 German Security Unit Veterans Association
- Berlin Brigade Memories
- History of the Berlin Brigade
- History of the French, American and British Berlin Brigades
- Berlin 1969 – the Allies in Berlin at midpoint of the Cold War
- British Army of the Rhine Locations
- Berlin-Brigade Installations
- "West Alliierte in Berlin". The history of the three Western Allied Forces and their civilian employees in Berlin from 1945–1994.
- BerlinBrigade.com Dedicated to all that served in West Berlin from 1945 to 1994
