= 1 Field Engineer Squadron =

Engineer unit of the Corps of Royal Engineers within the British Army

1st Field Engineer Squadron
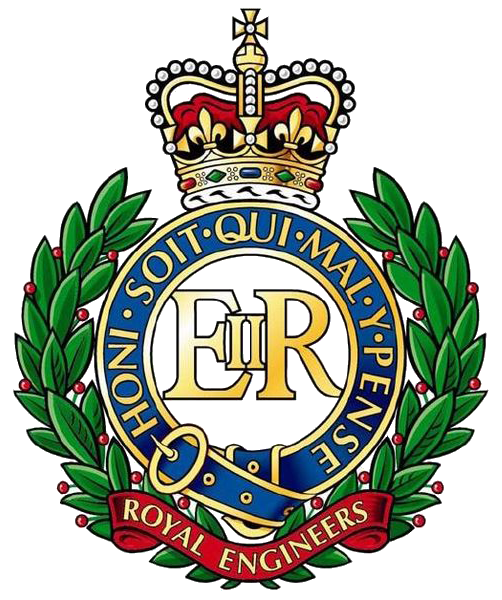
- Cap badge of the Corps of Royal Engineers
- Active: 1887—1919; 1925—1971; 1948—Present
- Country: United Kingdom
- Branch: British Army: Corps of Royal Engineers
- Role: Combat Engineers
- Size: Squadron
- Part of: 21 Engineer Regiment
- Nicknames: Dog Sqn, 1st Field Sqn
- Engagements: First World War: Gallipoli Campaign; Second World War: Defence of Gibraltar; Operation Banner; Operation Granby; Operation Grapple; Operation Agricola; Operation Telic: Operation Telic V; Operation Telic XI; Operation Herrick: Operation Herrick XII; Operation Herrick XVII
- Website: 21 Engineer Regiment

The 1st Field Engineer Squadron is an engineer unit of the Corps of Royal Engineers within the British Army. The squadron was first formed in 1914 following the mobilisation of the Army for the First World War. The squadron later supported The Cavalry Division and the first British Army of the Rhine. The squadron later saw service in the Second World War and today supports the 21st Engineer Regiment of the new 1st Strike Brigade.

== History ==
=== Early years ===
In October 1887, the 1st Fortress Company was formed in Bermuda. The formation was part of the major expansion and numbering of the Corps of Royal Engineers following the Childers Reforms. In May 1890 the company moved to Chatham and by October moved to Cork. By January 1903 the company moved to Gibraltar where they remained as one of the major fortress companies in the area. Before mobilisation, the company was still based in Gibraltar in the same role as a fortress company supporting the engineering units in the area. In addition to supporting the troops, the company was assigned to support the fortifications and bases in the area.

In 1915, Sir Ian Hamilton proposed a planned invasion of the Ottoman Empire via the Dardanelles. This expedition later became known as the Gallipoli Campaign, of which would become world known for many of the wrong reasons many years later. Because of this expeditionary force, known as the Mediterranean Expeditionary Force was assembled. Among the troops assigned for this force was the 1st Fortress Company of the Corps of Royal Engineers. The company embarked from Gibraltar en route for Egypt where it joined the force later moving to Mudros that same month. By January 1916 the expedition was called off due to failures of moving through the peninsula. The company as a result moved to France on the Western Front where it joined the BEF.

After moving to France, the company was retitled and reroled as the 1st Advance Park Company, and later that year as the 1st Base Park Company. The company was finally disbanded in 1919.

=== Second World War ===
By July 1925, the company was reformed as the 1st Fortress Company and based in Gibraltar. This reformation came as part of the reorganisation of the Corps of Royal Engineers. The company was formed from the former 15th Fortress Company. By 1935 the company was reorganised as a mixed Electrical and Antiaircraft Searchlight Company, this reorganisation came after the War Office realised the importance of antiaircraft defences and searchlight support.

While based in Gibraltar, the company was under command of Gibraltar Command Royal Engineers. The company spent the entire war in Gibraltar providing support for the troops there and construction and maintenance of the defences.

=== Postwar ===
Following the end of the war, the company continued to be based in Gibraltar in 1971 when it was disbanded. In 1948 the 1st Field Squadron was reformed after the end of the war, this was the 2nd regiment to be part of the lineage of the squadron. By later 1948 the squadron moved to Singapore, in 1949 was in Hong Kong in the independent role, and by February 1950 moved to St Georges Barracks in Minden under the 27th Field Engineer Regiment.

After moving to Minden, the 27th Field Regiment was formed, and the squadron was designated as the senior unit of the regiment. In 1957 the 27th Field Regiment was disbanded and the squadron moved under the control of the 4th armoured divisional engineer regiment. After moving to Alanbrooke Barracks in Paderborn, the squadron was assigned to the 20th Armoured Brigade for operational support.

By 1960, the squadron was placed under the control of the 1st Divisional Engineers, and by 1962 moved to Assaye Barracks in Neinburg as a result of the regiment's move. In 1964 the squadron was placed under the 11th Infantry Brigade following the re-organisation of the divisional engineer regiment. In 1969 the Corps of Royal Engineers went through a major re-organisation, this meant that all former engineer regiment will given a number thus, the 1st Division's Engineers became 21st Engineer Regiment. Following this change, the squadron was placed under the direct control of the regiment, but remained in their barracks in Neinburg.

From 30 April—5 August 1971, the squadron saw a deployment with the 21st Engineer Regiment to Long Kesh in the infantry role. This deployment was the first of many deployments the squadron would see in support of Operation Banner . The squadron then saw four deployments to Northern Ireland; 8 November 1972—6 March 1973 (Ballykelly), 15 December 1974—11 April 1975 (Long Kesh), and 25 September 1976—29 December 1976 (Londonderry). In 1978, the British Army of the Rhine was re-organised as a result of the 1975 Mason Review. Part of the changes was the elimination of titles e.g.; 20th Armoured Brigade became Task Force Hotel. In accordance with these reforms, the 21st Engineer Regiment was renamed as the 1st Armoured Divisional Engineer Regiment, yet the squadron remained in their barracks. After this minor change, the squadron deployed to Ballykelly in Northern Ireland from 23 June 1978—25 October.

In 1981, another major set of reforms was enacted by the Government. These reforms became known as "The Way Forward" and reduced the regular army while expanding the territorial army. Among many other changes to the other services and corps, the British Army of the Rhine was renamed back to their old titles with the 1st Armoured Divisional Engineers being separated back into the 21st Engineer Regiment. Again, the squadron remained part of the new regiment and remained in their barracks. From July—November 1984 the squadron saw deployment to the Falkland Islands assigned to the 37th Engineer Regiment as part of the routine engineer squadron deployment.

Later in 1990, the squadron saw deployment to Kuwait in support of Operation Granby supporting the 7th Armoured Brigade. In 1992 the Options for Change reforms were announced (See: Options for Change), but these reforms had no effect on the regiment or squadron. From May—October 1993 the squadron deployed to Yugoslavia as part of Operation Grapple II replacing the 35th Engineer Regiment. In 1994 the "Front Line First" paper was announced, these paper's main purpose was to reduce, namely the army's, forces in Germany. As a result, the 21st Engineer Regiment was told they were to move to Assaye Barracks Nienburg, another location in Germany as part of the closing of many stations in the western part of Hanover. In 1995 the squadron saw deployment to Gornji Vakuf and Bugojno on Operation Grapple VI. In January 1996 the squadron moved along with 21 Engineer Regiment to Quebec Barracks in Osnabrück. From early 1997—September 97 the squadron deployed to the Falkland Islands and in 1998 on Operation Agricola I in the Serbian Autonomous Province of Kosovo. Following the Strategic Defence Review of 1998, the squadron along with 21 Engineer Regiment again moved, this time to Roberts Barracks.

=== Modern Day ===
In 2000, the squadron was re-designated as 1 Armoured Engineer Squadron under 21st Engineer Regiment. By 2003 the squadron was re-designated as 1 Field Squadron. The squadron then deployed with 21 Engineer Regiment on Operation Telic two times; Operation Telic V (November 2004—April 2005) and Operation Telic XI (December 2006—June 2008). By 2008 following the Delivering Security in Changing World reforms of 2003, the 21st Engineer Regiment moved to Ripon Lines in Catterick in 2008 along with the brigade they were supporting, the 4th Mechanised Brigade. Just before move as a result of the Army 2020 reforms, the squadron had the following structure;

- Squadron Headquarters (2 FV436, 2 FV432, 3 Spartans, 1 FV432 Ambulance)
  - Administrative Echelon (No armoured vehicles assigned)
  - Fitters Section (1 FV434, 1 FV432, 1 Samson)
- 1 Field Troop (42 Personnel) [1 Spartan and 5 FV432]
- 2 Field Troop (Same as 1st) [Same as 1st]
- 3 Field Troop (Same as 1st) [Same as 1st]
- Support Troop (1 FV432, 1 Spartan, 4 CET)

In 2010, the initial Army 2020 reforms were announced, and the 21st Engineer Regiment was moved under control of the 12th Force Support Engineer Group [Being name to Force Support from Air Support in 2014], itself under the 8th Engineer Brigade. This group was initially assigned to support the army through engineering support and providing engineering to the Adaptable Force (1st (United Kingdom) Division). The regiment saw two more deployments in Afghanistan; Operation Herrick XII (April—October 2010) and Operation Herrick XVII (October 2012—April 2013). Following the Army 2020 refines, the squadron is still part of 21 Engineer Regiment, now supporting the 1st Strike Brigade. The squadron and regiment are currently based at Claro Barracks.

== Sources ==
- The Monthly Army List, July 1914. (1914). [ebook] London, County of London, England: The War Office. Available at: https://deriv.nls.uk/dcn23/1032/4427/103244277.23.pdf [Accessed 13 Sep. 2019].
- Watson Graham E and Rinaldi Richard A. The Corps of Royal Engineers: Organisation and Units 1889–2018. Tiger Lilly Books ISBN 9781717901804
- “British Army Units from 1945 On.” British Army Units from 1945 on - 1 Squadron, http://british-army-units1945on.co.uk/royal-engineers/squadrons/1-squadron.html.
- Watson, Graham E. and Rinaldi, Richard A. The British Army in Germany (BAOR and After): An Organisational History 1947-2004 Tiger Lilly Publiscations LLC 2005. ISBN 0-9720296-9-9
