= Berlin Headquarters and Signal Regiment =

Cyprus District Signal Regiment 29th Signal Regiment Berlin Headquarters and Signal Regiment
- Active: 1955–1962; 1983–1994
- Country: United Kingdom
- Branch: British Army
- Role: Military Communications

The Berlin Headquarters and Signal Regiment, also previously known as 29th Signal Regiment was a regiment of the Royal Corps of Signals. The regiment served as the garrison signal regiment for both Cyprus and Berlin.

== Cyprus Signal Regiment ==
The Regiment traces its history back to the Cyprus District Signal Regiment which was formed in 1955 at Kykko Camp. The regiment ran several geographically separate outstations:

- G Troop at Lakitamia (Jamming)
- Radio Center at Limassol
- Radio Center at Dhekelia
- Radio Center at Paphos
- Radio Center at Platres

By September 1959 the regiment was renumbered as 29th Signal Regiment and in 1962 it was disbanded. The regiment played a role during the Cyprus Emergency confronting EOKA. Following the end of the crisis the regiment's duties were taken over by 15th (Cyprus) Signal Regiment.

== Berlin Signal Regiment ==
29 Signal Regiment was later reformed again in 1983 by enlarging the former 229 Signal Squadron to form 29 (Berlin) Headquarters and Signal Regiment. In 1986 the 229 squadron was awarded the Freedom of Wilmersdorf.

By 1988 the regiment was retitled as Berlin Headquarters and Signal Regiment. While stationed in Berlin the regiment worked with 4th Signal Group to provide communications from the west to the city. Finally following the end of the Cold War the regiment disbanded. One of its squadrons, 229 Signal Squadron, remained at Stadium Barracks in Berlin until 1994. 229 Squadron then joined 7 Signal Regiment (United Kingdom) and moved to Bradbury Barracks in Krefeld.
