= Ludgershall, Wiltshire =

Town in Wiltshire, England

Coordinates: 51.256°N 1.622°W

Ludgershall
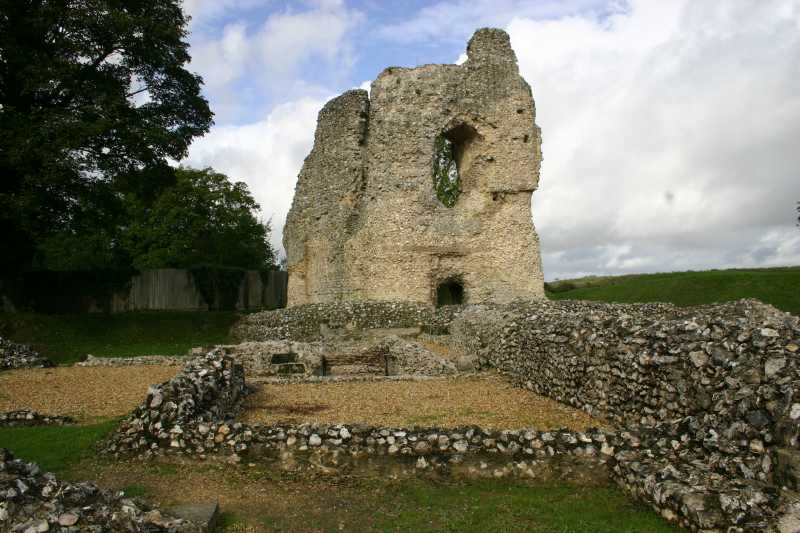
- Ludgershall Castle

- Location within Wiltshire
- Population: 5,390 (2021 Census)
- OS grid reference: SU265508
- Civil parish: Ludgershall
- Unitary authority: Wiltshire
- Ceremonial county: Wiltshire
- Region: South West
- Country: England
- Sovereign state: United Kingdom
- Post town: ANDOVER
- Postcode district: SP11
- Dialling code: 01264
- Police: Wiltshire
- Fire: Dorset and Wiltshire
- Ambulance: South Western
- UK Parliament: East Wiltshire
- Website: Town Council

Ludgershall (/ˈlʌɡərʃɔːl/ LUG-ər-shawl, with a hard g) is a town and civil parish 16 miles (26 km) north east of Salisbury, Wiltshire, England. It is on the A342 road between Devizes and Andover. The parish includes Faberstown which is contiguous with Ludgershall, and the hamlet of Biddesden which lies 2 miles (3.2 km) to the east, on the border with Hampshire.

== History ==
There is evidence of settlement in the late Bronze Age or early Iron Age at Windmill Down on the western edge of the parish.

The name Ludgershall derives from the Old English lūtegār "a spear set as a trap to impale wild animals" and halh "a nook of land". The Domesday Book of 1086 recorded small settlements at Ludgershall and Biddesden. The entry for Litlegarsele reads: "Edward of Salisbury holds Ludgershall. Alfward held it before 1066; it paid tax for one hide (about 24 acres). Land for 3 ploughs. In Lordship 2 ploughs, 3 slaves; 8 Cottagers with 1 plough. Pasture 3 furlongs long and 1 furlong wide; woodland ½ league long and 2 furlongs wide." The value was 100 shillings.

Ludgershall Castle was constructed by 1103, and was one of King John's favourite residences, one of five outside London where apartments were kept ready for him. The village may have been a planned borough of the early 12th century. It lay on the old Marlborough to Winchester road, which was an important route in the early 13th century. Later, the village lost its importance, and was damaged by fire in 1679. Among the oldest buildings are the Queen's Head public house, from the 16th and 18th centuries, and cottages on Castle Street from the late 17th.

Windmill Hill has been part of the Salisbury Plain Training Area since c.1898, and land in the west of the parish has been used by the Army since 1939. Military activity, including the construction of Tidworth Camp nearby, led to a substantial increase in the population of the parish.

=== Faberstown ===
At the beginning of the 20th century, a local MP, Walter Faber, began building to the east of the town on land in Hampshire. This settlement became known as Faberstown. By 1970 Ludgershall and Faberstown were in essence a single village, and in 1992 a boundary change brought Faberstown into Wiltshire.

=== Biddesden ===
Biddesden is a hamlet to the east of Ludgershall, reached via Faberstown along Biddesden Lane. It is on the Hampshire/Wiltshire border and while most of Biddesden is in Wiltshire, Biddesden Bottom, the site of the Ludgershall Roman Villa, and the public footpath sign thereto, are in Hampshire.

== Buildings and structures ==
=== Castle ===
In 1141 the Empress Maud took refuge in Ludgershall Castle as she fled from King Stephen's army. She was accompanied by Milo Fitzwalter and escaped disguised as a corpse to Vies (Devizes) and thence to Gloucester. Some 600 years later a seal was found by a ploughman, bearing a knight in armour and holding a lance shield with the inscription "Sigillum Millonis De Glocestria". It is thought Fitzwalter threw away the seal to avoid identification when he escaped as a beggar. During succeeding centuries the castle was occupied by many distinguished persons and royalty frequently resided there. The village grew around the castle.

The building was turned into a hunting lodge by King Henry III but fell into disuse by the 15th century. The property is now under the care of English Heritage. Three large walls and extensive earthworks remain, although a large section of the original plot is now a private residence.

=== Cross ===
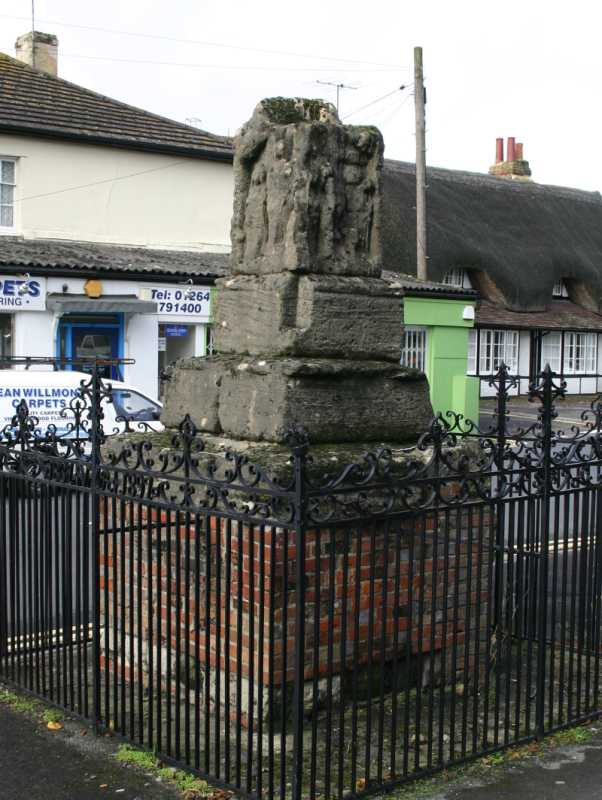
The preaching cross in Ludgershall

The remains of a Medieval preaching cross known as Ludgershall Cross are situated in the town centre and the cross dates to the 14th century, likely during the reign of Edward III (r.1327-77). This is also under the care of English Heritage. It was re-erected some time in the early 19th century in the area that formed the old market place, near the present Queen's Head pub at the end of High Street. It is some 12 feet in height and in 1897, to celebrate the Diamond Jubilee of Queen Victoria, an ornamental iron fence was erected around the cross. The cross has carved representations on four sides but they are badly eroded. It is thought the original sculptured panels represented:

- North side – The Ascension of Jesus
- South side – The Three Marys
- East side – The Crucifixion of Jesus
- West side – The Command to Saint Paul

The railings were designed by A. H. Huth and bear a crown in each corner. A local Masonic lodge, The Border Lodge no.3129, consecrated in 1905 and meeting at the old Prince of Wales House hotel building, uses the preaching cross as its emblem.

=== Parish church ===
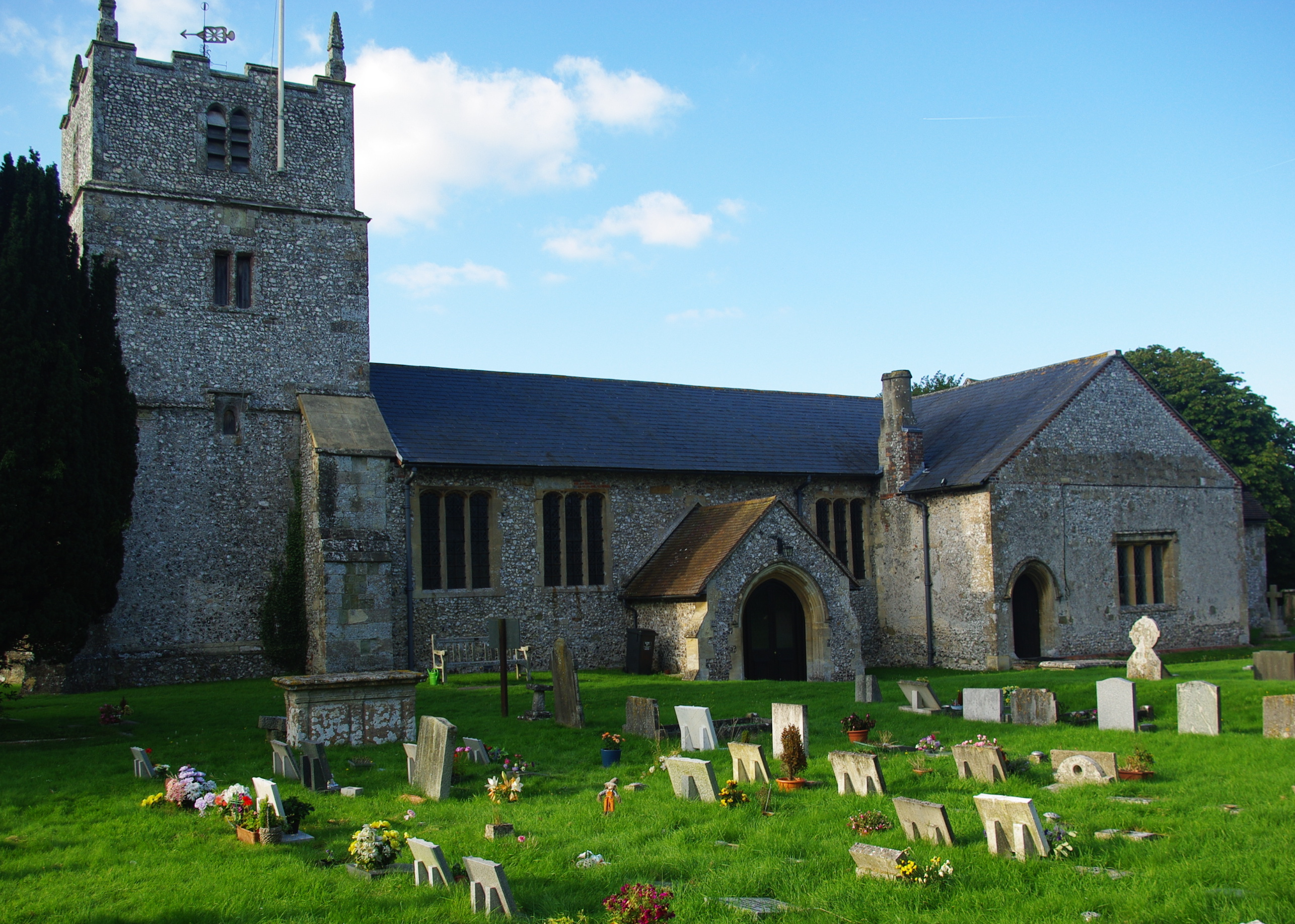
St James' Church

There has been a church at Ludgershall since the 12th century; it was granted to Amesbury Priory in 1228 and united with Biddesden in 1446. Faberstown was added to the ecclesiastical parish in 1945, and since 1979 the name of the parish is Ludgershall and Faberstown.

The parish church of St James has a blocked doorway and a north window from the 12th century. The chancel was rebuilt in the early 13th century and the transepts and north chapel were added in the 14th. The tower was rebuilt or extensively repaired in 1675. Wiltshire Museum, Devizes, has an 1805 watercolour of the church by John Buckler. In restoration of 1873 by J.L. Pearson and David William Hunt the roofs were replaced, the tower heightened and the south porch added.

The tower has six bells, two from the 17th century. The building was designated as Grade I listed in 1964.

The font is probably from the 15th century. There is a large monument to Richard Brydges (1500–1588), his wife Jane Spencer and their family, described by Pevsner as "one of the most important of its date in England". Also buried in the church is John Webb (1667–1724). The organ was built by Walker in 1853.

=== Biddesden House ===
Biddesden House, now a Grade I listed house and home to an Arabian Horse stud farm, is described in the Imperial Gazetteer of England and Wales (1870–72) as being the chief residence of the parish of Ludgershall. The previous building was built before 1693 and the present building was built between 1711 and 1712.

=== Corunna Barracks ===
Corunna Barracks was established during the Second World War; the US Army prepared vehicles for the invasion of Europe at the depot in 1943. The barracks were later home to 26 Engineer Regiment, Royal Engineers. The buildings were demolished in 2015 to make way for military housing.

== Railway ==
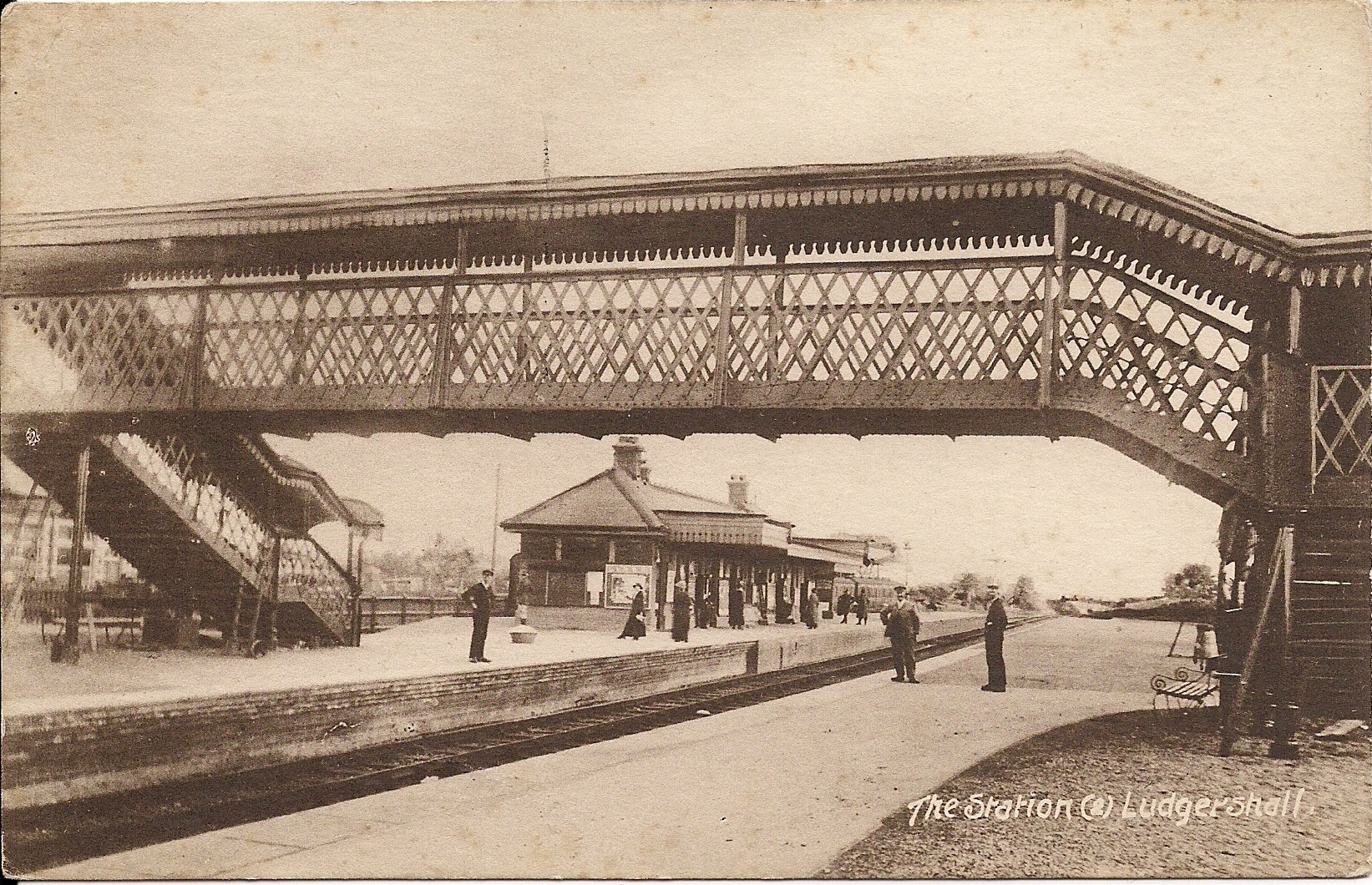
Ludgershall station in the 1900s

Ludgershall railway station opened on the Swindon, Marlborough and Andover Railway in 1882. By 1894 the operator was the Midland and South Western Junction Railway, providing services between Cheltenham and Southampton. A branch from Ludgershall was built to serve Tidworth Camp in 1901, and was opened to public traffic in 1902. In 1943 a short spur was added to serve the military depot at Ludgershall, to the south of the main road.

Ludgershall station closed in 1961, along with the line north to Swindon, followed in 1963 by the branch to Tidworth. The spur at Ludgershall and line south to Andover remain open, to allow the Army to transport tanks and other equipment to and from the depot (until its closure in 2015) and onwards to the Salisbury Plain Training Area. There is a level crossing on Tidworth Road.

Ludgershall Town Council and the pressure group Railfuture have been campaigning for the line between Ludgershall and Andover to be reopened for passenger services.

== Media ==
Local news and television programmes are provided by BBC South and ITV Meridian. Television signals are received from either the Hannington or Rowridge TV transmitters.

The town is served by BBC Radio Wiltshire and BBC Radio Berkshire. Other radio stations are Greatest Hits Radio Salisbury and Castledown FM, a community-based station.

The local newspapers that cover the town are the Salisbury Journal and Andover Advertiser.

== Government ==
The civil parish elects a parish council which styles itself as Ludgershall Town Council. It is in the area of Wiltshire Council unitary authority, which is responsible for all significant local government functions.

The parish falls in the 'Ludgershall and Perham Down' electoral ward. The ward stretches south east from the Ludgershall area to Perham Down. The total ward population at the 2011 census was 5,874.

Ludgershall was a parliamentary borough which elected two members of parliament (MPs) to the House of Commons from 1295 until 1832, when the borough was abolished by the Great Reform Act. The small size of Ludgershall led to it being cited as an example of a "rotten borough".

== County confusion ==
A common misconception is that the town is in the county of Hampshire rather than Wiltshire. This is compounded by the postal code of SP11 and telephone dialling code of 01264 which are both associated with Andover, Hampshire.

== The modern town ==
Ludgershall has developed considerably in the late 20th and early 21st centuries, and is now an important town supporting a number of flourishing businesses and a considerable amount of housing. Part of the former Army depot site became Castledown Business Park. The community is well provided for in terms of entertainment and shops with two pubs and social clubs, a number of small independent traders, and two supermarket chains.

There is a primary school – Ludgershall Castle Primary School, built in 1965 as a secondary school for girls – and a secondary school: The Wellington Academy, opened in 2011. A second primary school, Wellington Eagles, was opened in 2020.
