= Scottish Division =

Infantry command of the British Army

The Scottish Division was a British Army Infantry command, training and administrative apparatus designated for all Scottish line infantry units. It merged with the Prince of Wales' Division, to form the Scottish, Welsh and Irish Division in 2017.

== History ==
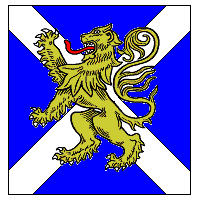
The Tactical Recognition Flash of the Scottish Division

The Scottish Division was formed on 1 July 1968 with the amalgamation of the Lowland Brigade and Highland Brigade. From 1970, junior soldiers of the Scottish Division were trained at the Scottish Infantry Depot (SID), Bridge of Don, in Gordon Barracks, and adult recruits trained in the SID Glencorse.

In 1994, due to the Options for Change review, the Gordon Highlanders were amalgamated with the Queen's Own Highlanders (Seaforth and Camerons) to form the Highlanders (Seaforth, Gordons and Camerons). Changes announced in 2004 involved the amalgamation of the Royal Scots and the King's Own Scottish Borderers to form the Royal Scots Borderers and the formation of a single large regiment to be known as the Royal Regiment of Scotland.

Regular Army Units

- The Royal Scots Borderers, 1st Battalion, Royal Regiment of Scotland
- The Royal Highland Fusiliers, 2nd Battalion, Royal Regiment of Scotland
- The Black Watch, 3rd Battalion, Royal Regiment of Scotland
- The Highlanders 4th Battalion, Royal Regiment of Scotland
- Balaklava Company, The Argyll and Sutherland Highlanders 5th Battalion, Royal Regiment of Scotland

Army Reserve Units

- 52nd Lowland, 6th Battalion, Royal Regiment of Scotland
- 51st Highland, 7th Battalion, Royal Regiment of Scotland

In addition, the Scottish Division also maintains a single regular military band in the Corps of Army Music, the regimental Band of the Royal Regiment of Scotland. This was formed in 2006 by the amalgamation of two former divisional bands, the Highland Band and the Lowland Band.

In December 2016, the government announced changes to the administrative structure of the infantry as part of the continuing reorganization of the Army under "Army 2020". This saw the Royal Regiment of Scotland (which encompassed the entirety of the Scottish Division) transferred to a single administrative formation with the Royal Welsh and the Royal Irish Regiment (which came under the Prince of Wales' Division), known as the Scottish, Welsh and Irish Division.

== Past units ==
Past units include:

- 1st Battalion, The Royal Scots (The Royal Regiment) – (1633–2006)
- 1st Battalion, The Royal Highland Fusiliers (Princess Margaret's Own Glasgow and Ayrshire Regiment)] – (1959–2006)
- 1st Battalion, The King's Own Scottish Borderers – (1689–2006)
- 1st Battalion, The Black Watch (Royal Highland Regiment) – (1881–2006)
- 1st Battalion, The Queen's Own Highlanders (Seaforth and Camerons) – (1961–1994)
- 1st Battalion, The Gordon Highlanders – (1881–1994)
- 1st Battalion, The Argyll and Sutherland Highlanders (Princess Louise's) – (1881–2006)
- Royal Scots Battalion, The Royal Regiment of Scotland – (2006)
- King's Own Scottish Borderers Battalion, The Royal Regiment of Scotland – (2006)
- The Argyll and Sutherland Highlanders, 5th Battalion, The Royal Regiment of Scotland – (2006–2014)

== Sources ==
- Heyman, Charles (2012). The British Army: A Pocket Guide, 2012–2013. Pen & Sword. ISBN 9781848841079.
