= 22 Engineer Regiment (United Kingdom) =

- Active: 1948 – Present
- Country: United Kingdom
- Branch: British Army
- Role: Engineer
- Size: Regiment; 621 personnel
- Part of: 3rd Division (United Kingdom)
- Garrison/HQ: Swinton Barracks
- Website: 22 Engr Regt RE

22 Engineer Regiment is a regiment of the British Army's Royal Engineers. It is based at Swinton Barracks, Perham Down, Tidworth, Wiltshire.

== History ==
22 Engineer Regiment can trace its postwar history back to 1948 when the 22nd Field Engineer Regiment was formed in British Libya from the former 1st Infantry Divisional Engineers. In 1951, the regiment moved to the Suez Canal Zone. In 1954, the regiment returned to Libya and in 1955 transferred to the British Middle East Land Forces. When the 1st Division returned to the United Kingdom, the regiment fell under the command of the 10th Armoured Division until 1957 when it shifted to Chiseldon, Wiltshire and joined the 3rd Infantry Division.

The regiment was broken up in March 1960 and its headquarters was renamed as the Headquarters Royal Engineers, 3rd Division. In 1972 the regiment served in Northern Ireland. By 1975, the regiment moved to Perham Down, also in Wiltshire, and in 1979 assisted the civil community in the Dominican Republic during Hurricane David. In 1977, the regiment was assigned to the 8th Field Force and in 1982 fell under the command of the 1st Mechanized Brigade. In 1996, the regiment deployed as part of the United Nations Protection Force in Bosnia and returned in a second deployment in 1999.

As part of Operation Telic, the regiment deployed to Iraq and served in TELIC IV (April–November 2004) and TELIC X (June–December 2007). As part of Operation Herrick the regiment deployed for its last time to Afghanistan as part of HERRICK XVIII (April–October 2013).

== Organization ==
The regiment's structure is as follows:

- 22 Engineer Regiment, in Tidworth
  - 6 Headquarters and Support Squadron
  - 3 Armoured Engineer Squadron
  - 5 Armoured Engineer Squadron
  - 52 Armoured Engineer Squadron
  - Royal Electrical and Mechanical Engineers Light Aid Detachment (Army Reserve)
