= 26 Engineer Regiment (United Kingdom) =

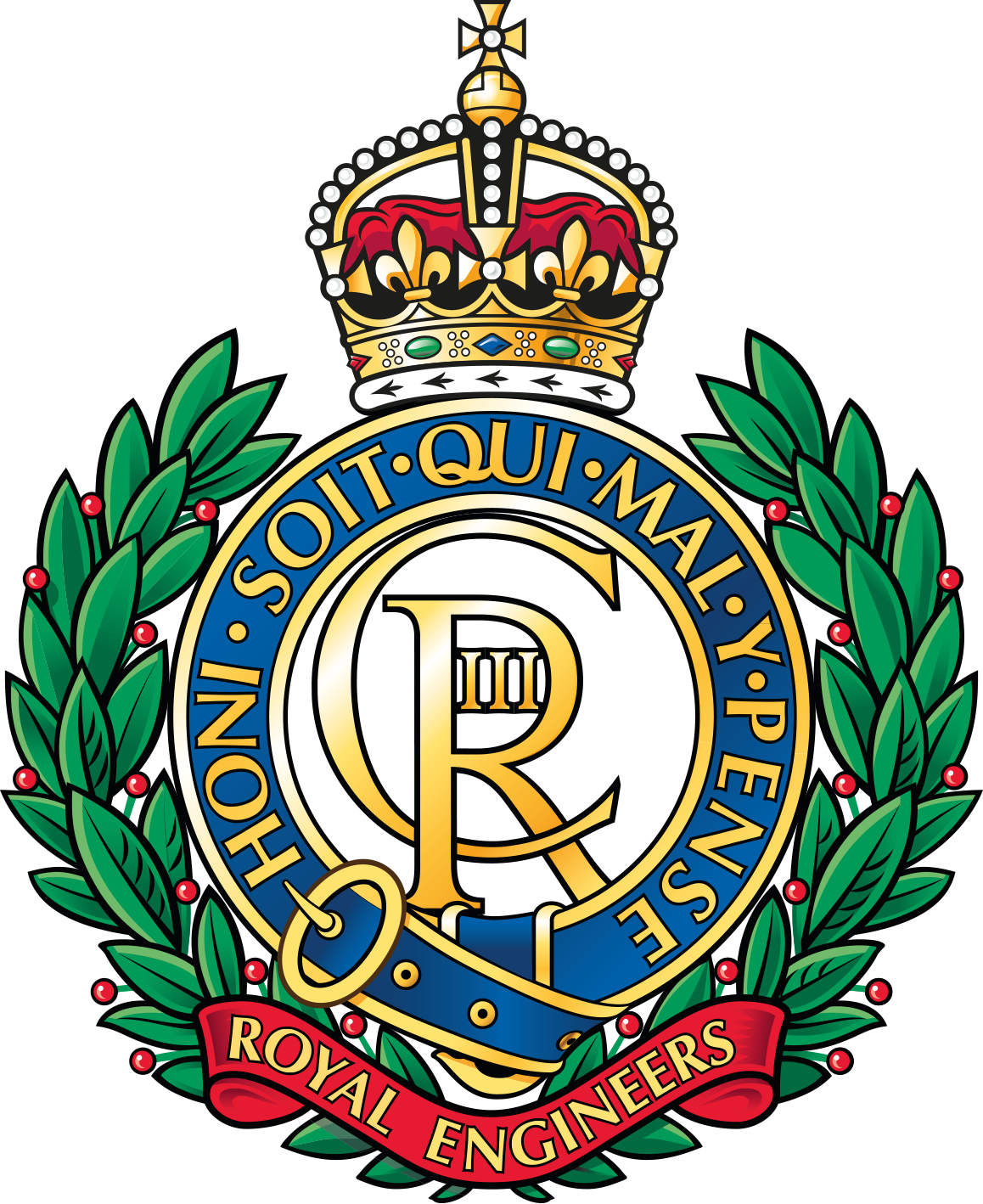
- Regimental Badge of the Royal Engineers.
- Active: 1950 – 1994; 2000 – present
- Country: United Kingdom
- Branch: British Army
- Role: Engineer
- Size: Regiment; 622 personnel
- Part of: Royal Engineers
- Garrison/HQ: Swinton Barracks, Salisbury Plain
- Website: 26 Engr Regt RE

26 Engineer Regiment is a regiment of the British Army's Royal Engineers. It is based at Swinton Barracks, Salisbury Plain, Wiltshire.

== History ==
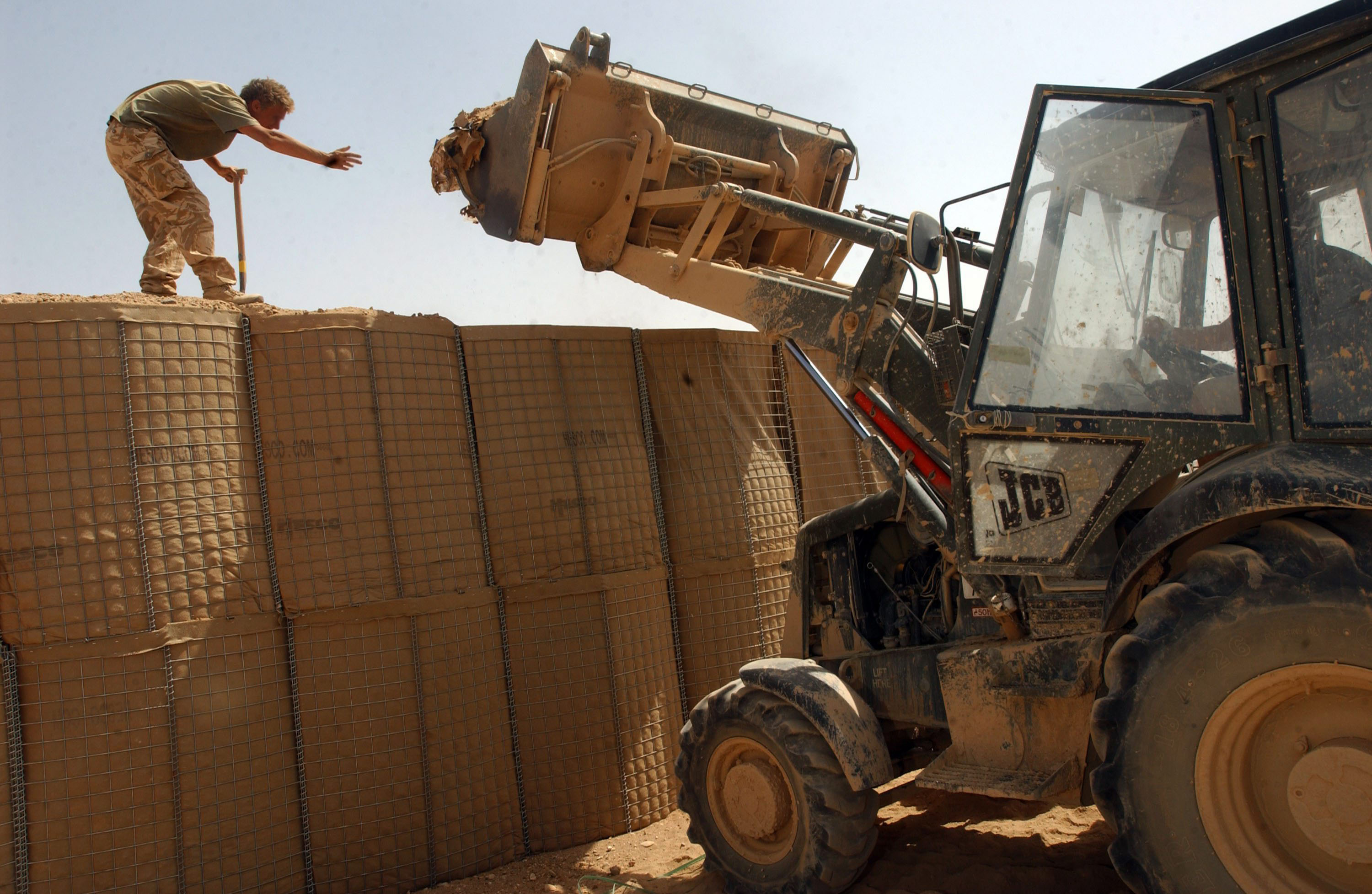
26 Engineer Regiment working at a desert camp in Afghanistan

The unit was formed in 1950 and in April 1956 moved to 4th Armoured Division in the same role. In November 1957, the regiment was reorganised and re-titled as "Headquarters Royal Engineers, 4th Division" and moved to Paderborn, Germany. By 1969, it was expanded in size and in 1970, the regiment moved to Iserlohn. From July to November 1974, the regiment was tasked as an infantry unit and served in Northern Ireland. By 1978, the regiment was reorganised again as the new 3rd Armoured Division's Armoured Engineer Regiment. The Regiment reformed in 2000 with 38 HQ and Support Squadron and 8 Armd Engr Sqn and from August to February of the same year the regiment served as part of Kosovo Force. When the regiment came back from operations it moved to Horne Barracks, Larkhill, but later moved to Corunna Barracks, Ludgershall. The regiment served in both Operation Telic and Operation Herrick, namely TELIC VI, HERRICK VI and HERRICK XVI. In January 2009 the regiment moved to Swinton Barracks at Perham Down.

Under Army 2020 the regiment moved to 25 (Close Support) Engineer Group.

In September 2026, personnel from 33 Armoured Engineer Squadron, part of the regiment, took the duties of the King’s Guard at Buckingham Palace and other locations.

== Organization ==
Its structure is as follows:

- 26 Engineer Regiment, in Swinton Barracks
  - 38 Headquarters and Support Squadron
  - 8 Armoured Engineer Squadron
  - 30 Armoured Engineer Squadron
  - 33 Armoured Engineer Squadron
