= 15th Signal Regiment (United Kingdom) =

Special signal regiment of the British Army's Royal Corps of Signals

15th Signal Regiment Headquarters Northern Ireland and 15th Signal Regiment 15th (Cyprus) Signal Regiment General Headquarters Signals, Middle East
- Mau the unit insignia of 15 Signal Regiment
- Active: 1936—1938; 1940—1963; 1965—1967; 1992—2007; 2011—Present
- Country: United Kingdom
- Branch: British Army: Royal Corps of Signals
- Role: Global Communications
- Size: Regiment; 326 personnel
- Part of: Swinton Barracks, Perham Down

The 15th Signal Regiment (15 Sig Regt) is military communications unit of the British Army's Royal Corps of Signals.

== History ==
The regiment was originally formed before World War II during the expansion of British Army signals units. The unit provided communications for the island of Cyprus but was disbanded shortly after 1963. In 1992, following the Options for Change reforms, it was reformed to support HQ Northern Ireland and other units deployed during Operation Banner.

=== World War Period ===
==== Inter-war ====
Before World War II, the Egypt Signals unit was formed. It was tasked with providing communications and signals support for British Army units based in Egypt. Their area of responsibility was not limited to Egypt itself, but included the following areas: Mandatory Palestine, Sudan, and Cyprus. During this time, the unit was collectively known as Egypt Command Signals.

==== World War II ====
In 1940, the regiment was based in Cairo. Following Italy's entry in the war, the regiment's support ranged from providing signals and communications for units in Cyprus, Greece, Macedonia, the Balkans, and Eastern Africa.

==== Cyprus ====
Following the end of World War Two, the regiment was re-titled in 1946 as the 3rd General Headquarters Signal Regiment. In 1959, Middle East Command was dissolved and split into two new formations, namely, British Forces Suez Canal and British Forces Arabian Peninsula. As a result, the regiment was renamed as 15th (Cyprus) Signal Regiment to better represent their new role.

=== Cold War ===
On 15 January 1965, the regiment was reformed in Aden. After this reform, the regiment was re-titled as 15th Signal Regiment.

=== Post-Cold War ===
The regiment was reformed for the third time at Thiepval Barracks in Lisburn, Northern Ireland in 1990 and was re-titled as 15th Signal Regiment.

After the Options for Change reforms, the Regiment gained command of more signal squadrons. After the end of Operation Banner in Northern Ireland, the Regiment was disbanded.

On 30 September 2011, the Unified Systems Support Organisation (USSO), based in Blandford Forum in Dorset, was renamed as the 15th Signal Regiment (Information Support), or abbreviated as 15 Sig Regt (IS), and so resurrecting for the fifth time the name of the Regiment. Responsible for providing level 3 and 4 specialist support to all MoD units in Information Communication Services (ICS) and Communication Information Systems (CIS).

According to a FOI Response, the Regiment will fall under the command of 11th Signal Brigade and Headquarters West Midlands. By 2019 the Regimental HQ will move from its current location at Blandford Camp to Swinton Barracks in Perham Down, thereby co-locating with the remainder of the regular units of 7th Signal Group. The remainder of the old Squadrons will reform as 13 Sig Regt, and remain based under a new Regimental HQ at Blandford Camp.

The Regiment under this reform is to re-organise and become a close support signals unit. The Regiment will support the 12th Armoured Infantry Brigade by 2020.

In 2019, the 15 Sig Regt HQ moved from Blandford Camp to Swinton Barracks in Perham Down.

== Structure ==
The regiment's current structure in April 2025 is as follows:

- 15th Signal Regiment, at Swinton Barracks, Perham Down
  - Regimental Headquarters
  - 207 (Armoured) Signal Squadron
  - 243 (Gurkha) Signal Squadron
  - Support Squadron

== Sources ==
- Lord, Cliff, and Graham Watson. The Royal Corps of Signals Unit Histories of the Corps (1920-2001) and Its Antecedents. Helion and Company, 2003. ISBN 1874622922
- "HQ 11th Signal and West Midlands Brigade". www.army.mod.uk. Retrieved 2019-10-20.
- "Royal Signals". www.army.mod.uk. Retrieved 2019-10-20.
