= Scottish, Welsh and Irish Division =

Infantry command in British Army

The Scottish, Welsh and Irish Division was a British Army Infantry command, training and administrative formation for Scottish, Welsh and Irish line infantry regiments.

== History ==
In 2016, following the further planned reorganization of the Army that was started under the 2010 SDSR, the Ministry of Defence announced that the Prince of Wales' Division was to be disbanded. The three infantry regiments that formed the Prince of Wales' Division would be reassigned, with the Mercian Regiment transferred to the King's Division, while the Royal Welsh and Royal Irish Regiment would move to the administration of the Scottish Division, bringing together all three remaining non-English line infantry regiments. Taking into account the new formation, the division was announced as being renamed to the Scottish, Welsh and Irish Division.

The command was officially "stood-up" in April 2017, with the first troops having their passing out ceremony from the Infantry Training Centre at Catterick in August 2017.

== Current units ==
The division consists of the following units.

Regular Army units

- Royal Highland Fusiliers, 2nd Battalion, Royal Regiment of Scotland (Light infantry)
- Black Watch, 3rd Battalion, Royal Regiment of Scotland (Light infantry)
- The Highlanders, 4th Battalion, Royal Regiment of Scotland (Heavy protected mobility infantry)
- Balaklava Company, 5th Battalion, Royal Regiment of Scotland (Public duties)
- 1st Battalion, Royal Welsh (Armoured infantry)
- 1st Battalion, Royal Irish Regiment (Light infantry)

Army Reserve units

- 52nd Lowland, 6th Battalion, Royal Regiment of Scotland
- 51st Highland, 7th Battalion, Royal Regiment of Scotland
- 3rd Battalion, Royal Welsh
- 2nd Battalion, Royal Irish Regiment
