= Army 2020 Refine =

Mid-to-late 2010s reorganisation of the British Army

Army 2020 Refine was the name given to the restructuring of the British Army in the mid-to-late 2010s, in light of the Strategic Defence and Security Review 2015. As its name suggests, it was a "refinement" of Army 2020, an early 2010s reorganisation of the Army to be completed by 2020, originally conducted in light of the Strategic Defence and Security Review 2010. It was succeeded by Future Soldier.

== Reorganisation ==
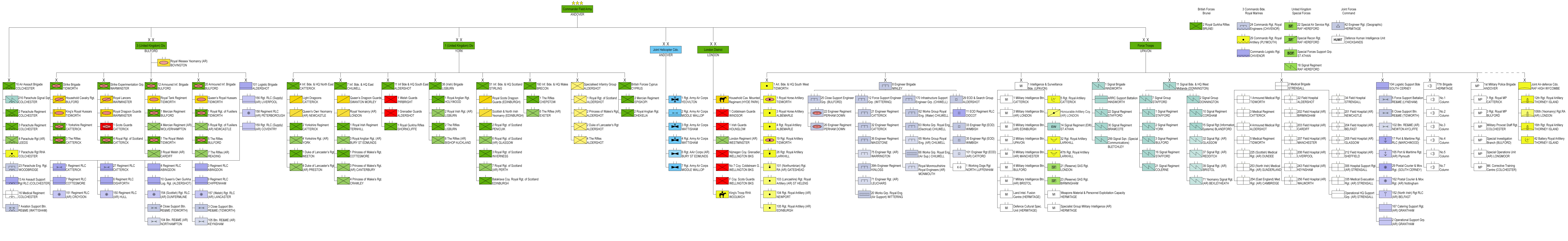
Structure of the British Army after the "Army 2020 Refine" reform (click to enlarge)

The Strategic Defence and Security Review 2015 announced that the structure of the Reaction and Adaptable Forces would further change, in an evolution of the previous Army 2020 plan. The main changes of Army 2020 Refine were:

- The creation of two new "strike brigades", to be formed by converting an Armoured Infantry brigade and an Infantry brigade. These will be formed by 2025, comprising 5,000 personnel each, equipped with Ajax vehicles.
- The UK's 3rd Division will, by 2025, comprise two armoured infantry brigades, a strike brigade, and a strike experimentation group (which would later convert to a second Strike brigade).
- Creation of a Specialised Infantry Group, to be formed by converting four infantry battalions and creation of a new battalion and training cell.
- Two innovative brigades were to be established, comprising a mix of regulars and specialist capabilities from the reserves, that were able to contribute to strategic communications, tackle hybrid warfare and deliver better battlefield intelligence.

=== Strike brigades & Armoured Infantry brigades ===
The armoured infantry brigades were reduced from three to two, as one was converted to a Strike Brigade. In a Defence Committee hearing, Chief of the General Staff Sir Nicholas Carter stated that "each of these [Strike] brigades will have two AJAX regiments and probably two Mechanised Infantry Vehicle (MIV) battalions as well". There was to be around 50 to 60 Ajax vehicles per Strike Brigade.

A December 2016 written statement stated that the first Strike Brigade to form would consist of:

- Household Cavalry Regiment
- King's Royal Hussars
- 1st Battalion, Scots Guards
- The Highlanders, 4th Battalion, Royal Regiment of Scotland

Other units such as 1 Regiment RLC, 1 Close Support Battalion REME, 3 Medical Regiment and 21 Engineer Regiment would provide close support to this Strike Brigade. 3rd Regiment, Royal Horse Artillery, and 4th Regiment, Royal Artillery were to provide artillery support to the Strike Brigades.

=== Specialised Infantry Group ===
A total of five Specialised Infantry battalions, around 300 personnel strong:

- Royal Scots Borderers, 1st Battalion, Royal Regiment of Scotland
- 4th Battalion, The Rifles
- 2nd Battalion, Princess of Wales’s Royal Regiment
- 2nd Battalion, Duke of Lancaster's Regiment
- 3rd Battalion, Royal Gurkha Rifles (formed in 2018)

=== Other changes ===
Several units were initially meant to be rationalised, with all manpower in those units being redeployed to other areas of the Army in its refined structure. These were originally:

- Headquarters, 102nd Logistic Brigade
- 35 Engineer Regiment
- Headquarters, 64 Works Group, Royal Engineers
- 2 Medical Regiment
- Headquarters, 4th Regiment, Royal Military Police
- 33 Field Hospital
- 104, 105 and 106 Battalions of the Royal Electrical and Mechanical Engineers
- 32nd Regiment, Royal Artillery

However, 35 Engineer Regiment was retained and reformed as an explosive ordnance and search regiment. 32nd Regiment, Royal Artillery, was also retained in October 2019.

The Scottish and Prince of Wales' Divisions of infantry merged, incorporating the Royal Regiment of Scotland, Royal Welsh and Royal Irish Regiment. This administrative division was called the Scottish, Welsh and Irish Division. The Mercian Regiment transferred from the Prince of Wales’ Division to the King's Division.

=== Field Army restructuring 2019 ===
The Field Army was restructured in July/August 2019 as set out below.

- 1st (United Kingdom) Division
  - 4th Infantry Brigade and Headquarters North East
  - 7th Infantry Brigade and Headquarters East
  - 11th Infantry Brigade and Headquarters South East
  - 51st Infantry Brigade and Headquarters Scotland
  - 8th Engineer Brigade
  - 102nd Logistic Brigade
  - 104th Logistic Support Brigade
  - 2nd Medical Brigade
- 3rd (United Kingdom) Division
  - 1st Armoured Infantry Brigade
  - 12th Armoured Infantry Brigade
  - 20th Armoured Infantry Brigade
  - 1st Artillery Brigade
  - 101 Logistic Brigade
  - 25 (Close Support) Engineer Group
  - 7th Air Defence Group
- 6th (United Kingdom) Division (formerly Force Troops Command)
  - 1st Signal Brigade (United Kingdom)
  - 11th Signal Brigade
  - 1st Intelligence, Surveillance and Reconnaissance Brigade
  - Specialised Infantry Group
  - 77th Brigade

== See also ==
- Future of the Royal Navy
- Future of the Royal Air Force
- List of equipment of the British Army
- List of units and formations of the British Army 2020
