= Prince of Wales's Division =

- Active: 1968–2014
- Country: United Kingdom
- Branch: British Army
- Type: Administrative Command

The Prince of Wales's Division was a British Army command, training and administrative apparatus designated for all land force units in the West of England and Wales. It merged with the Scottish Division, to form the Scottish, Welsh and Irish Division; at the same time the Mercian Regiment joined with the King's Division.

== History ==
The Prince of Wales's Division was formed in 1968 with the union of the Mercian Brigade, Welsh Brigade and Wessex Brigade. The depot was established at Whittington Barracks in Staffordshire.

Under the restructuring announced in 2004, the Prince of Wales's Division lost the remaining Westcountry infantry regiments and was reorganised into two large regiments:

- Royal Welsh - formed on 1 March 2006 by amalgamation of the 1st Battalion, Royal Welch Fusiliers, 1st Battalion, Royal Regiment of Wales (24th/41st Foot) and the Royal Welsh Regiment.
- Mercian Regiment - formed on 1 September 2007 by amalgamation of the 1st Battalion, 22nd (Cheshire) Regiment, 1st Battalion, Worcestershire and Sherwood Foresters Regiment (29th/45th Foot), 1st Battalion, Staffordshire Regiment (The Prince of Wales's) and the West Midlands Regiment. In 2014 the Royal Irish Regiment joined the division. The Division comprised the following infantry battalions:
- Regular Army Units
  - 1st Battalion, The Mercian Regiment (Cheshires, Worcesters and Foresters, and Staffords)
  - 2nd Battalion, The Mercian Regiment (Cheshires, Worcesters and Foresters, and Staffords)
  - 1st Battalion, The Royal Welsh
  - 1st Battalion, The Royal Irish Regiment (27th (Inniskilling), 83rd, 87th and Ulster Defence Regiment)
- Army Reserve Units
  - 4th Battalion, The Mercian Regiment (Cheshires, Worcesters and Foresters, and Staffords)
  - 3rd Battalion, The Royal Welsh
  - 2nd Battalion, The Royal Irish Regiment (27th (Inniskilling), 83rd, 87th and Ulster Defence Regiment)

The Division maintained a regular army band, The Band of The Prince of Wales Division through the amalgamation of the two former divisional bands, the Clive Band and the Lucknow Band.

Under the Army 2020 reorganisation, the 3rd Battalion, Mercian Regiment (Staffords) and the 2nd Battalion, Royal Welsh (Royal Regiment of Wales) will both be disbanded, while the Royal Irish Regiment (27th (Inniskilling), 83rd, 87th and Ulster Defence Regiment) will be transferred to the administration of the Prince of Wales' Division.

In December 2016, the government announced changes to the administrative structure of the infantry as part of the continuing reorganization of the Army under "Army 2020". This saw the Mercian Regiment being moved to the King's Division, with the Royal Regiment of Scotland (which encompassed the entirety of the Scottish Division) transferred to a single administrative formation with the Royal Welsh and the Royal Irish Regiment. This new administrative formation became known as the Scottish, Welsh and Irish Division.

== Past Units ==
Past units include:

- 1st Battalion, The 22nd (Cheshire) Regiment - (1688-2007)
- 1st Battalion, The Royal Welch Fusiliers - (1689-2006)
- 1st Battalion, The South Wales Borderers - (1689-1969)
- 1st Battalion, The Gloucestershire Regiment - (1881-1994)
- 1st Battalion, The Worcestershire Regiment - (1881-1970)
- 1st Battalion, The Royal Hampshire Regiment - (1881-1992)
- 1st Battalion, The Welch Regiment - (1881-1969)
- 1st Battalion, The Sherwood Foresters (Nottinghamshire and Derbyshire Regiment) - (1881-1970)
- 1st Battalion, The Devonshire and Dorset Regiment - (1958-2005)
- 1st Battalion, The Duke of Edinburgh's Royal Regiment (Berkshire and Wiltshire) - (1959-1994)
- 1st Battalion, The Staffordshire Regiment (The Prince of Wales's) - (1959-2007)
- 1st Battalion, The Royal Regiment of Wales (24th/41st Foot) - (1969-2006)
- 1st Battalion, The Worcestershire and Sherwood Foresters Regiment (29th/45th Foot) - (1970-2007)
- 1st Battalion, The Royal Gloucestershire, Berkshire and Wiltshire Regiment - (1994-2005)
- 2nd Battalion, The Royal Welsh - (2006-2014)
- 3rd Battalion, The Mercian Regiment - (2007-2014)

== Sources ==
- Heyman, Charles (2012). The British Army: A Pocket Guide, 2012-2013. Pen & Sword. ISBN 9781848841079.
