= Units of the Royal Corps of Signals =

This is a list of units of the British Army's Royal Corps of Signals.

== Brigades ==
- 1st Signal Brigade (1982—1987)
  - 1st Signal Group (1968—1982)
- 1st (United Kingdom) Signal Brigade (1995—Present)
- 2nd (National Communications) Signal Brigade (1982—2012)
  - 2nd (Static Communications) Signal Group (1968—1982)
  - 2nd Signal Brigade (1982—1992)
- 11th Signal Brigade and Headquarters West Midlands (2014—2024)
  - 11th Signal Brigade (V) (1967—1992)
  - 11th (Allied Rapid Reaction Corps) Signal Brigade (1992—1997)
  - 11th Signal Brigade (1997—2014)
- 12th Signal Brigade (1982—1992)

== Groups ==
- 1st Signal Group (1968—1982), later 1st (United Kingdom) Signal Brigade
- 2nd (Static Communications) Signal Group (1968—1982), later 2nd (National Communications) Signal Brigade
- 3rd Signal Group (V) (1967—1975)
- 4th Signal Group (1969—1992)
- 12th Signal Group (1967—1982), later 12th Signal Brigade
- 13th Signal Group (V) (1967—1972)
- Headquarters, Radio Group British Army of the Rhine (1963—1977)
- Headquarters, Communications and Security Group (United Kingdom)
- Headquarters, Royal Signals Malta
- Headquarters, Commonwealth Communications Network

== Regiments ==
Air Formation

- 10 Air Formation
- 11 Air Formation
- 12 Air Formation

Line of Communications

- 2 LoC

HQ and Signal

- HQ BAOR
- 1 Corps
- 1 Division
- 2 Infantry Division
- 2 Division
- 3 Armoured Division Signal Regiment
- 4 Infantry Division
- 4 Division
- 5 Division
- 6 Armoured Division
- 7 Armoured Division
- 11 Armoured Division

Signal

- HQ Northag
- 1 Wireless
- 7 (Corps)
- 7
- 7 (ARRC)
- 9 Signal Regiment (Cyprus)
- 10
- 13 (Radio)
- 14 Army
- 14 (EW)
- 16
- 18 Army Group
- 19 Army Group
- 21 (Air Formation)
- 21 (Air Support)
- 22 (Air Formation)
- 22 (Corps)
- 22
- 28
- 83 Group

== Squadrons ==
- 200
- 201
- 202
- 204
- 205
- 206
- 207
- 208
- 209
- 210
- 211
- 212
- 217
- 218
- 229
- 230
- 231
- 232
- 252
- 253
- 255
- 262
- 280

== See also ==
- List of Royal Air Force Radio & Signals units
