= Claro Barracks =

British Army barracks in North Yorkshire, England

- Ripon
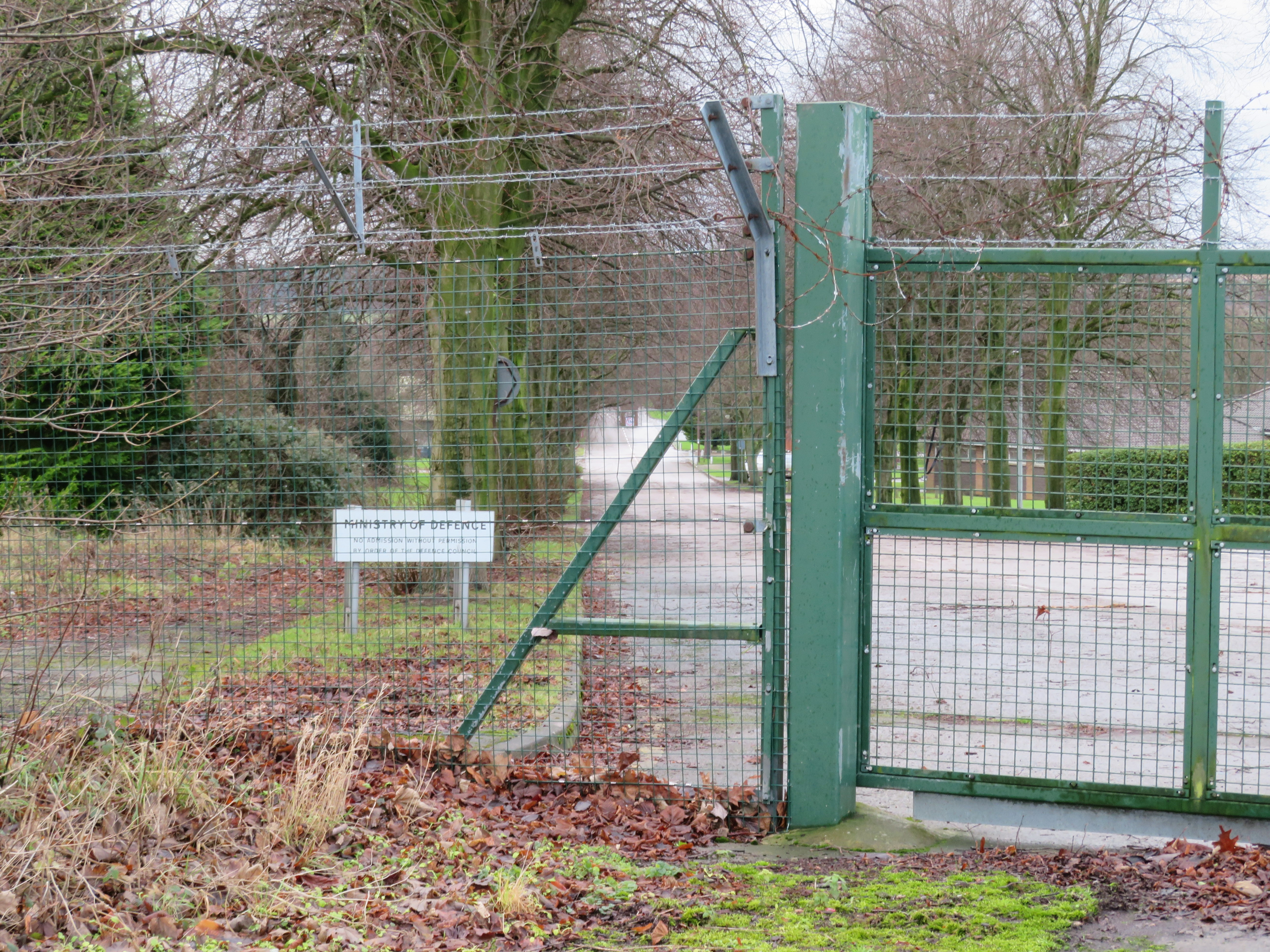
- Part of the Claro Barracks site

Site information
- Type: Barracks
- Owner: Ministry of Defence
- Operator: British Army

Location
- Location within North Yorkshire
- Coordinates: 54°8′37″N 01°33′0″W

Site history
- Built: 1914-1915
- Built for: War Office
- In use: 1915-Present

Garrison information
- Occupants: 21 Engineer Regiment

Claro Barracks is a British Army installation in Ripon, North Yorkshire.

== History ==
The barracks, which were originally established as the command depot i.e. convalescent camp for Northern Command, opened in April 1915 during the First World War. Wilfred Owen wrote many of his poems when based at the barracks, known at the time as Ripon Army Camp, in spring 1918.

At the start of the Second World War, the School of Military Engineering, which had been based in Chatham, was split into two training battalions, one of which re-located to the barracks. The barracks were renamed Harper Barracks, after Lieutenant-General Sir George Harper, a famous engineer general.

In 1940, an Experimental Tunnelling Section was formed, followed in January 1942 by the School of Bomb Disposal.

Both the School of Military Engineering and the School of Bomb Disposal returned to Chatham in 1949. During the 1950s, Harper Barracks was the home of a Royal Signals training regiment.

In 1959, the barracks became the home of 38 Engineer Regiment, who would remain there for nearly half a century. The barracks was rebuilt and renamed Claro Barracks, after Claro Hill - a local beauty spot, in the 1960s. In 1974, a bomb attack by the Provisional Irish Republican Army badly damaged the barracks.

The barracks went on to become the home of 21 Engineer Regiment in 2008.

=== Future closure ===
The Ministry of Defence announced in March 2013 that the site had been earmarked for closure. Consequently, in November 2016, it was announced that the site would close in 2019. This was later extended to 2028.

== Current units ==
The following notable units are based at Claro Barracks.

=== British Army ===
Corps of Royal Engineers

- 21 Engineer Regiment
  - 7 Headquarters and Support Squadron
  - 1 Field Squadron
  - 4 Field Squadron
  - 29 Field Squadron
