= Colerne Airfield =

British Army facility in Wiltshire, England

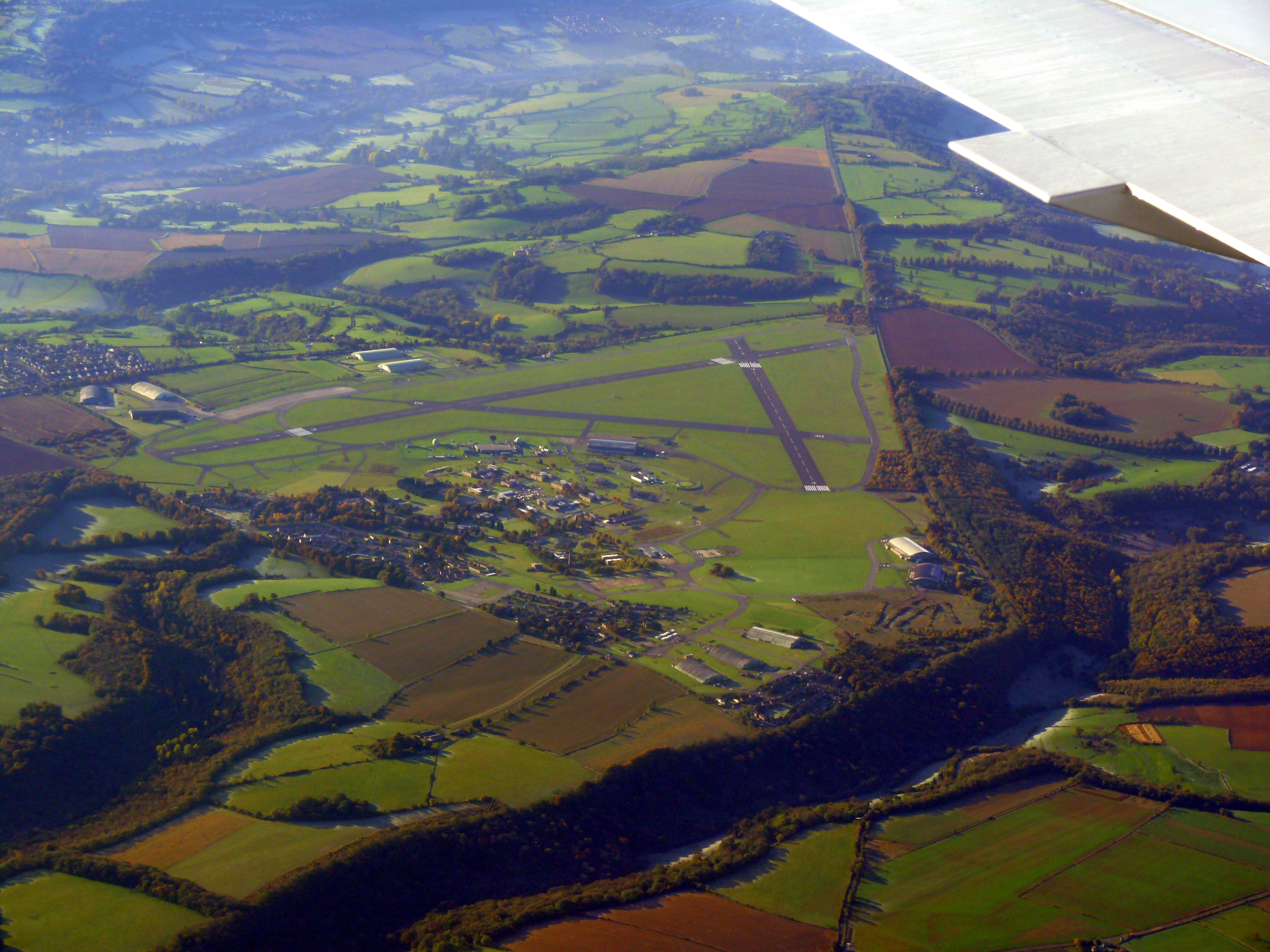
- IATA: none; ICAO: EGUO

Summary
- Airport type: Military
- Owner: Ministry of Defence
- Operator: British Army
- Location: Colerne, Wiltshire
- Occupants: 21 Signal Regiment
- Elevation AMSL: 593 ft (181 m)
- Coordinates: 51°26′21″N 002°17′11″W

Map
- Location in Wiltshire

Runways
| Direction | Length | | Surface |
| Direction | m | ft | Surface |
|---|---|---|---|
| 01/19 | 1,095 | 3,593 | Asphalt |
| 07/25 | 1,664 | 5,459 | Asphalt |
- "Airport information for EGUO". World Aero Data. Archived from the original on 5 March 2019. Data current as of October 2006.

Colerne Airfield (ICAO: EGUO), now known as Azimghur Barracks, is a British Army facility just north-west of the village of Colerne, Wiltshire, England. It is set to close in 2029.

== History ==
RAF Colerne was opened on this site in 1940, and was in operation until 1976. From 1940 to 1955, RAF Fighter Command units were based here. During the Battle of Britain, the airfield served as a satellite field to RAF Middle Wallop, and squadrons rotated back and forth from there on a daily basis.

From the early 1970s until closure in 1976, Colerne was home to part of the RAF Museum collection of historic aircraft, such as the Handley Page 115, Me163, Gloster Meteors, DH114 Vampire, PBY6 Catalina, Supermarine Spitfire, Percival Provost, Bleriot replica, Gloster Javelin, Douglas DC-3 Dakota, Hawker Hunter and many others.

In the 1970s and 1980s, Azimghur Barracks was used as a training depot by the Royal Corps of Transport's and The Royal Army Ordnance Junior Leaders Regiment.

The airfield was the headquarters of Bristol University Air Squadron, a Volunteer Reserve unit which recruits from several universities in south-west England, until their move to MoD Boscombe Down in 2022.

== Present day ==
The site is a ground station for the Skynet 5 military satellite system that provides battlefield support (e.g. real-time imagery from remote-piloted drones in various theatres of war). It is in close proximity to the underground Corsham Computer Centre.

The Azimghur Barracks part of the site is home to 21 Signal Regiment.

Since November 1992, the airfield is used by Air Cadets and 3 Air Experience Flight. Since 2026, the airfield has been the home of the RAF Brize Norton Gliding club, who moved from Keevil Airfield.

== Future ==
In November 2016, the Ministry of Defence announced that the airfield would close in 2018 (later extended to 2029), and Azimghur Barracks in 2031 (later brought forward to 2030).
