= 7th Signals Group (British Army) =

7th Signal Group
- Formation badge
- Active: September 2014–Present
- Country: United Kingdom
- Branch: British Army
- Type: Military Communications Headquarters
- Size: Group
- Part of: 3rd (UK) Division
- Group HQ: Picton Barracks, Bulford

7th Signal Group (7 Sig Gp) is a military communications formation of the British Army's Royal Corps of Signals, currently subordinated to 3rd (UK) Division. The group oversees the close-support signal units of the corps tasked with supporting 3rd (UK) Division.

== History ==
After the announcement of Army 2020 in 2010, the 7th Signal Group was formed in 2014 as part of the expanded 11th Signal Brigade and Headquarters West Midlands. Along with the formation of the new group, the 2nd Signal Group was also formed, which oversaw the home resilience units. 7th Signal Group's mission was to control all the multi-role signal regiments under the Army 2020 programme.

Following the disbandment of the 2nd Signal Group in 2018, 7th Signal Group took control of the reserve regiments within 2nd Signal Group, and was subsequently reorganised in 2022 into its current structure following the Future Soldier reforms and the disbandment of 11th Signal Brigade. It now provides all close-support signal units for 3rd (UK) Division.

== Structure ==
The current structure of the group, as of July 2025 is:

- Headquarters, 7th Signal Group, at Picton Barracks, Bulford
  - 3rd (United Kingdom) Division Signal Regiment, Royal Corps of Signals, at Kiwi Barracks, Bulford Camp — supports HQ 3rd (UK) Division
  - 15th Signal Regiment, Royal Corps of Signals, at Swinton Barracks, Perham Down — supports 12 ABCT
  - 71st (City of London) Yeomanry Signal Regiment, Royal Corps of Signals, at Bexleyheath — supports the wider Division
