= Swinton Barracks =

Military installation at Tidworth in Wiltshire, England

- Part of Tidworth, Netheravon and Bulford Garrison
- Perham Down, Wiltshire in England
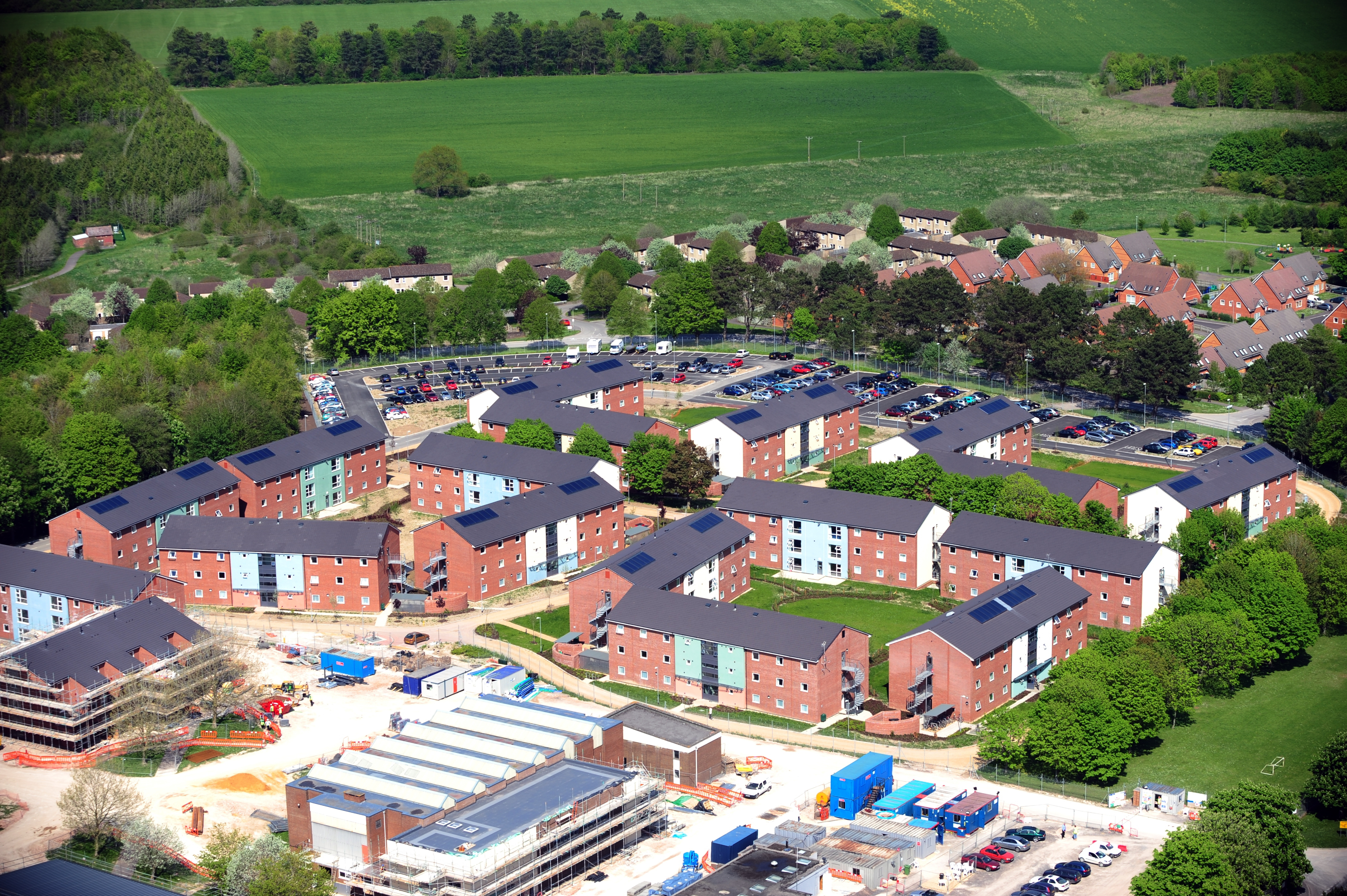
- Swinton Barracks

Site information
- Type: Army barracks
- Owner: Ministry of Defence
- Operator: British Army

Location
- Location within Wiltshire
- Coordinates: 51.239°N 1.632°W
- Area: 130 hectares (320 acres)

Site history
- Built: 1915
- Built for: War Office
- In use: 1915 – present

Garrison information
- Occupants: 1 Signal Regiment; 15 Signal Regiment; 22 Engineer Regiment; 26 Engineer Regiment

Swinton Barracks is a military installation accommodating two engineer regiments and two signals regiments at Perham Down in Wiltshire, England. The site is on the east edge of Salisbury Plain, about 1 1/2 miles (2.4 km) east of the garrison at Tidworth. The camp forms part of the Tidworth, Netheravon and Bulford (TidNBul) Garrison.

== History ==
After 2nd London Division held their annual camp at Perham Down in 1914, a hutted army camp was built in the village to provide proper accommodation for the training of large military units.

During the Second World War the barracks were used as a training camp by the 99th Infantry Battalion of the United States Army.

The barracks were rebuilt between 1972 and 1974 and renamed Swinton Barracks at that time. 22 Engineer Regiment arrived at the barracks in January 1975 and were later joined by 26 Engineer Regiment. The barracks became a specialist centre for armoured engineering, and its name was chosen to commemorate Major-General Sir Ernest Swinton, who was an early advocate of armoured vehicles and responsible for the recruitment and training of the Tank Detachment in 1916, and, later, Colonel Commandant of the Tank Corps.

Extensive reconstruction at the barracks involving new or refurbished buildings was carried out under Project Allenby Connaught between 2006 and 2014.

== Units ==
The units currently based at the barracks are:

- 1st Signal Regiment
- 15th Signal Regiment, Royal Corps of Signals
- 22 Engineer Regiment
- 26 Engineer Regiment

== See also ==
- List of British Army installations
