= Options for Change =

1990 post–Cold War restructuring of the British Army

Options for Change was a restructuring of the British Armed Forces in summer 1990 after the end of the Cold War.

Until this point, UK military strategy had been almost entirely focused on defending Western Europe against the Soviet Armed Forces, with the Royal Marines in Scandinavia, the Royal Air Force (RAF) in West Germany and over the North Sea, the Royal Navy in the Norwegian Sea and North Atlantic, and the British Army in Germany.

With the collapse of the Soviet Union and the Warsaw Pact occurring between 1989 and 1991, the threat of a Soviet invasion of Western Europe fell away. While the restructuring was criticised by several British politicians, it was an exercise mirrored by governments in almost every major Western military power, reflecting the so-called peace dividend.

Total manpower was cut by approximately 18 per cent to around 255,000 (120,000 army; 60,000 navy; 75,000 air force).

Other casualties of the restructuring were the UK's nuclear civil defence organisations – the United Kingdom Warning and Monitoring Organisation and its field force, the Royal Observer Corps (a part-time volunteer branch of the RAF), both disbanded between September 1991 and December 1995.

== British Army ==
- Halving the troop strength in Germany by replacing the British Army of the Rhine with British Forces Germany in 1994.
- Several British Army regiments amalgamated: (Those new units which were formed are in bold, not all units are shown, only those which changed, for full list see: List of British Regular Army regiments (1994))
- Brigade of Gurkhas:
  - Regimental Headquarters, The Gurkha Engineers disbanded
  - **The Royal Gurkha Rifles** formed by amalgamation of: 2nd King Edward VII's Own Gurkha Rifles (The Sirmoor Rifles), 6th Queen Elizabeth's Own Gurkha Rifles, 7th Duke of Edinburgh's Own Gurkha Rifles, and 10th Princess Mary's Own Gurkha Rifles, 3 Battalion establishment
  - **The Queen's Own Gurkha Transport Regiment** formed by grouping of former independent Gurkha transport squadrons

=== Royal Corps of Signals ===
- 1st Armoured Division Headquarters and Signal Regiment disbanded and concurrently reformed from 4th Signal Regiment as Lower Saxony Signal Regiment, then re-titled as **1st (United Kingdom) Armoured Division Headquarters and Signal Regiment**
- 4th Armoured Division Headquarters and Signal Regiment disbanded to help reform 1st Signal Regiment
- 8th Signal Regiment absorbed into 11th (Royal School of Signals) Signal Regiment, Royal Corps of Signals
- 13th (Radio) Signal Regiment reduced to cadre and later disbanded
- **15th Signal Regiment and Headquarters Northern Ireland** formed to administer those signal squadrons in Northern Ireland
- 22nd Signal Regiment disbanded
- 28th (British) Signal Regiment (Northern Army Group) reduced to 280 (United Kingdom) Signal Squadron
- Berlin Headquarters and Signal Regiment reduced to 229 Signal Squadron

=== Royal Armoured Corps ===
Overall the Royal Armoured Corps was a merger of 18 regiments; of those were 10 regiments either newly formed or through amalgamations.

Bands

- **Band of the Dragoon Guards** formed by amalgamation of: 4th/7th Royal Dragoon Guards Band, 5th Royal Inniskilling Dragoon Guards Band, Royal Scots Dragoon Guards Band, and 1st The Queen's Dragoon Guards Band
- **The Royal Tank Regiment Cambrai Band** formed by amalgamation of: Cambrai Band of the Royal Tank Regiment, Alamein Band of the Royal Tank Regiment, Rhine Band of the Royal Tank Regiment
- **Band of the Hussars and Light Dragoons** formed by amalgamation of: 13th/18th (Queen Mary's Own) Royal Hussars Band, 15th/19th The King's Royal Hussars Band, The Queen's Own Hussars Band, The Queen's Royal Irish Hussars Band, The Royal Hussars (Prince of Wales's Own) Band, 14th/20th King's Hussars Band
- **Band of the Royal Lancers** formed by amalgamation of: 9th/12th (Prince of Wales's) Royal Lancers Band and The Queen's Royal Lancers Band

Regulars

- **Household Cavalry Regiment** formed by union of The Life Guards and The Blues and Royals (Royal Horse Guards and 1st (Royal) Dragoons)
- **The Royal Dragoon Guards** formed by amalgamation of 4th/7th Royal Dragoon Guards and 5th Royal Inniskilling Dragoon Guards as cavalry county regiment of: Belfast, Fermanagh, Cumbria, Wirral, Cheshire, and Yorkshire, formed **Pipes and Drums of the Royal Dragoon Guards** in September 1993, RHQ in York
- **The Queen's Royal Hussars (The Queen's Own and Royal Irish)** formed by amalgamation of The Queen's Own Hussars and The Queen's Royal Irish Hussars as cavalry county regiment of: Northern Ireland (minus Belfast and Fermanagh), Warwickshire, Worcestershire, West Midlands, Surrey, and Sussex, formed **Pipes and Drums of the Queen's Royal Hussars**, RHQ in London
- **The King's Royal Hussars** formed by amalgamation of The Royal Hussars (Prince of Wales's Own) and 14th/20th King's Hussars as county cavalry regiment of: Buckinghamshire, Berkshire, Gloucestershire, Hampshire, Oxfordshire, Wiltshire, Isle of Wight, Channel Islands, Lancashire, Cumbria, and Greater Manchester, two regimental depots; North Depot in Preston and South Depot in Winchester
- **Light Dragoons** formed by amalgamation of 13th/18th (Queen Mary's Own) Royal Hussars and 15th/19th The King's Royal Hussars as cavalry county regiment of: Tyne and Wear, County Durham, Northumberland, and North Yorkshire, depot in Newcastle upon Tyne
- **The Queen's Royal Lancers** formed by amalgamation of 16th/5th The Queen's Royal Lancers and 17th/21st Lancers as cavalry county regiment of: Staffordshire, West Midlands, Nottinghamshire, Lincolnshire, and South Humberside, depot in Grantham
- Royal Tank Regiment
  - **Pipes and Drums of the Royal Tank Regiment** formed from transfer from 4th RTR
  - **1st Royal Tank Regiment** and 4th Royal Tank Regiment amalgamated without change of title, recruiting from: Scotland and Merseyside
  - **2nd Royal Tank Regiment** and 3rd Royal Tank Regiment amalgamated without change of title, recruiting from: South East London, Somerset, Devonshire, Dorset, and Cornwall

Territorial Army

- **The Royal Mercian and Lancastrian Yeomanry** formed by amalgamation of The Queen's Own Mercian Yeomanry and The Duke of Lancaster's Own Yeomanry as county yeomanry regiment of: Shropshire, Warwickshire, Worcestershire, Staffordshire, Lancashire, and Greater Manchester
- **The Scottish Yeomanry** new formed regiment: resuscitation of old yeomanry units, country yeomanry of Scotland

=== Infantry ===
- Guards Division based at Wellington Barracks
  - Grenadier Guards' 2nd Battalion placed in suspended animation and reduced to Nijmegan Company, and became independent, and Inkerman Company transferred from 2nd Btn to 1st as No.3 Company
  - Coldstream Guards' 2nd Battalion placed in suspended animation and reduced to No.7 Company, and became independent
  - Scots Guards' 2nd Battalion placed in suspended animation and reduced to F Company, and became independent, Corps of drums also disbanded
- Scottish Division based at Glencorse Barracks covering the areas: Scotland.
  - All regimental bands amalgamated to form **The Lowland Band** and **The Highland Band**
  - The Royal Highland Fusiliers (Princess Margaret's Own Glasgow and Ayrshire Regiment): 1st Btn, 52nd Lowland Volunteers re-designated as 3rd (V) Battalion
  - The Black Watch (Royal Highland Regiment): 1st Btn, 51st Highland Volunteers re-designated as 3rd (V) Btn
  - The Highlanders (Seaforth, Gordons and Camerons): formed by amalgamation of the Queen's Own Highlanders (Seaforth and Camerons) and the Gordon Highlanders former as county regiment of: Caithness-shire, Elginshire, Nairnshire, Ross-shire, Sutherland, Orkney, Inverness-shire, Aberdeenshire, Banffshire, and Shetland. 1st Btn Regular, 2nd Btn, 51st Highland Volunteers re-designated as 3rd (V) Btn, RHQ in Inverness with outstation in Aberdeen
  - The Argyll and Sutherland Highlanders (Princess Louise's): 3rd Btn, 51st Highland Volunteers re-designated as 7th/8th (V) Btn
- The Queen's Division based at Warminster covering the areas of: London, Kent, Surrey, Sussex, Hampshire, Middlesex, Isle of Wight, and the Channel Islands, Northumberland, Norfolk, Suffolk, Essex, Northamptonshire, Lincolnshire, Rutland, and Cambridgeshire.
  - The Duke of Kent's Band and Saint George's Band of The Royal Regiment of Fusiliers amalgamated to form **The Normandy Band of the Queen's Division**
  - Bands of the 1st and 2nd Btns, Princess of Wales's Royal Regiment and 1st and 2nd Btns The Royal Anglian Regiment amalgamated to form **The Minden Band of the Queen's Division**
  - The Princess of Wales's Royal Regiment: formed by amalgamation of The Queen's Regiment and The Royal Hampshire Regiment as regular county regiment of: London, Kent, Surrey, Sussex, Hampshire, Middlesex, Isle of Wight, and the Channel Islands, RHQ & Depot in Canterbury part of Queen's Division
  - The Royal Regiment of Fusiliers' 3rd Btn disbanded
  - The Royal Anglian Regiment's 3rd Btn amalgamated with 1st and 2nd Btns
- The King's Division based at Imphal Barracks covering the areas of: Cumbria, Westmorland, Greater Manchester, Lancashire, Merseyside, East Riding of Yorkshire, North Yorkshire, and West Riding of Yorkshire.
  - Bands of the King's Own Royal Border Regiment, King's Regiment, and Queen's Lancashire Regiment amalgamated to form **The Normandy Band**
  - Bands of The Prince of Wales's Own West Yorkshire Regiment, The Green Howards (Alexandra, Princess of Wales's Own Yorkshire Regiment), and The Duke of Wellington's Regiment (West Riding) amalgamated to form **The Waterloo Band**
  - The Prince of Wales's Own Regiment of Yorkshire: 2nd Btn, Yorkshire Volunteers re-titled as 3rd (Yorkshire Volunteers) Btn,
  - The Green Howards (Alexandra, Princess of Wales's Own Yorkshire Regiment): 1st Btn, Yorkshire Volunteers re-titled as 4th/5th Btn
- The Prince of Wales's Division based at Whittington Barracks covering the areas of: Devonshire, Dorsetshire, Cheshire, Wales, Gloucestershire, Worcestershire, Staffordshire, Berkshire, and Wiltshire.
  - All regimental bands of the division amalgamated to form **The Clive Band** and **The Lucknow Band**
  - Royal Regiment of Wales: 3rd (V) and 4th (V) Btns amalgamated to form 2nd (V) Btn
  - **The Royal Gloucestershire, Berkshire and Wiltshire Regiment**: formed by amalgamation of the Gloucestershire Regiment and the Duke of Edinburgh's Royal Regiment (Berkshire and Wiltshire) as county regiment of: Gloucestershire, Berkshire, and Wiltshire with regimental depot in Gloucester with 1st Btn and 2nd (V) Btn
  - The Worcestershire and Sherwood Foresters Regiment (29th/45th Foot)'s 4th (V) Btn disbanded
- The Light Division based at Battlesbury Barracks covering the areas of: Somerset, Cornwall, South Yorkshire, Shropshire, County Durham.
  - The Light Infantry's 3rd Btn disbanded
  - The Royal Green Jackets' 3rd Btn disbanded
- **Royal Irish Regiment (27th (Inniskilling), 83rd, 87th and Ulster Defence Regiment)** formed by amalgamation of Ulster Defence Regiment and Royal Irish Rangers, while territorials retained Royal Irish Rangers title
- The Parachute Regiment: 15th (Scottish) Btn reduced to 15 (Scottish) Company in the 4th (V) Btn

=== Royal Artillery ===
- 2nd Field Regiment Royal Artillery placed in suspended animation, batteries transferred to: 1st RHA, 3rd RHA, and 32nd RA
- The Depot Regiment Royal Artillery placed in suspended animation
- 27th Field Regiment Royal Artillery placed in suspended animation, battery transferred to 29th RA

=== Corps of Royal Engineers ===
Regulars

- **Commander Royal Engineers (Airfields)** formed to control non-deployable royal engineer airfield elements at RAF bases in the UK
- 29th (Volunteer) Engineer Brigade along with its signal troop disbanded
- 30th (Volunteer) Engineer Brigade along with its signal troop disbanded
- 26th Engineer Regiment disbanded
- **1st Royal School of Military Engineering Regiment** formed by amalgamation of the Depot Regiment, Royal Engineers and 12th Royal School of Military Engineer Regiments, Royal Engineers
- **3rd Royal School of Military Engineering Regiment** formed by amalgamation of 1st Training and 3rd Training Regiments, Royal Engineers

Territorial Army

- 74th (Antrim Artillery) Engineer Regiment reduced to 74 Independent Field Squadron
- **76th Engineer Regiment** formed to control existing airfield damage repair squadrons in: Scotland and North of England
- **77th Engineer Regiment** formed to control existing airfield damage repair squadrons in: Eastern and Southern England
- **78th (Fortress) Engineer Regiment** formed to provide a new support regiment for the 3rd (United Kingdom) Mechanised Division
- 111th Engineer Regiment disbanded

=== Other Corps ===
- **Royal Logistic Corps**
  - Royal Corps of Transport
  - Royal Army Ordnance Corps
  - Royal Pioneer Corps
  - Army Catering Corps
  - Postal and Courier Service, Royal Engineers
- **Adjutant General's Corps**
  - Royal Army Educational Corps
  - Royal Army Pay Corps
  - Women's Royal Army Corps
  - Army Legal Corps
  - Corps of Royal Military Police
  - Military Provost Staff Corps
- **Army Medical Services**
  - Royal Army Medical Corps
  - Queen Alexandra's Royal Army Nursing Corps
  - Royal Army Dental Corps
  - Royal Army Vetinerary Corps

== Royal Air Force ==
=== Strike Command ===
- Withdrawal of the Blackburn Buccaneer strike aircraft and the disbandment of the RAF Lossiemouth-based Nos. 12 and 208 Squadrons and No. 237 Operational Conversion Unit (OCU).
- Closure of RAF Wattisham and transfer to the British Army, together with the withdrawal of the McDonnell Douglas Phantom from service and the disbandment of Nos. 56 and 74 Squadrons and the Leuchars-based No. 228 OCU.
- Closure of RAF Honington as a flying station, with it becoming the depot for the RAF Regiment – replacing RAF Catterick which was transferred to the British Army. The Panavia Tornados of No. 13 Squadron and the Tornado Weapons Conversion Unit relocated to RAF Marham and Lossiemouth respectively.
- The relocation of the Tornados of Nos. 27 (later renumbered to No. 12 Squadron) and 617 Squadrons from Marham to Lossiemouth and the modification of 28 aircraft to use the Sea Eagle anti-ship missile.
- Closure of RAF Brawdy and transfer to the British Army as Cawdor Barracks, and the disbandment of 1 Tactical Weapons Unit.
- Withdrawal of the remaining Handley Page Victor tankers, and the disbandment of No. 55 Squadron.
- A reduction of three Nimrod maritime patrol aircraft, together with the disbandment of No. 42 Squadron which merged with No. 236 OCU and relocated from RAF St Mawgan to RAF Kinloss.
- Withdrawal of the Bloodhound SAM and the disbandment of No. 85 Squadron.

=== RAF Germany ===
- Closure of RAF Wildenrath in April 1992 and RAF Gutersloh in March 1993, halving the number of RAF bases in Germany.
- Disbandment of Wildenrath's two Phantom air defence squadrons (Nos. 19 and 92 Squadrons).
- Disbandment of the three RAF Laarbruch Tornado strike/attack squadrons (Nos. XV, 16, and 20 Squadrons), and the transfer of No. II Squadron to Marham.
- Transfer of the Harriers of Nos. 3 and 4 Squadrons and the Chinooks of No. 18 Squadron from Gutersloh to Laarbruch, and the transfer of No. 230 Squadron from Gutersloh to RAF Aldergrove.

RAF Germany itself was disbanded on 1 April 1993, being downgraded to group-level and becoming No. 2 Group of Strike Command.

=== Procurement ===
- Cancelling the Brimstone air-to-surface missile project (later restarted).

== Royal Navy ==
- Cutting the number of frigates and destroyers from around 50 to 40. This was largely achieved through the decommissioning and disposal of aging types such as the remaining Leander-class frigates, as well as the sale of the remaining Type 21 frigates to Pakistan and the early Type 22 frigates to Brazil.

== On television ==
A dramatisation of the effects that Options for Change had on the ordinary men and women serving in the armed forces came in the ITV series Soldier Soldier. The fictional infantry regiment portrayed in the series, the King's Fusiliers, was one of those selected for amalgamation. It showed the whole process of negotiation over traditions, embellishments, etc. between the two regiments involved, and the uncertainty that many of those serving felt for their jobs in the light of two separate battalions merging into one, with the resulting loss of manpower.

== See also ==
- Delivering Security in a Changing World – 2003 British white paper
- Front Line First – United Kingdom defence review of 1994
- Strategic Defence and Security Review 2010 – United Kingdom Ministry of Defence defence review
- Strategic Defence Review (1998) – United Kingdom Ministry of Defence defence review (1998)
