= Perham Down =

Village in Wiltshire, England

Coordinates: 51.239°N 1.632°W

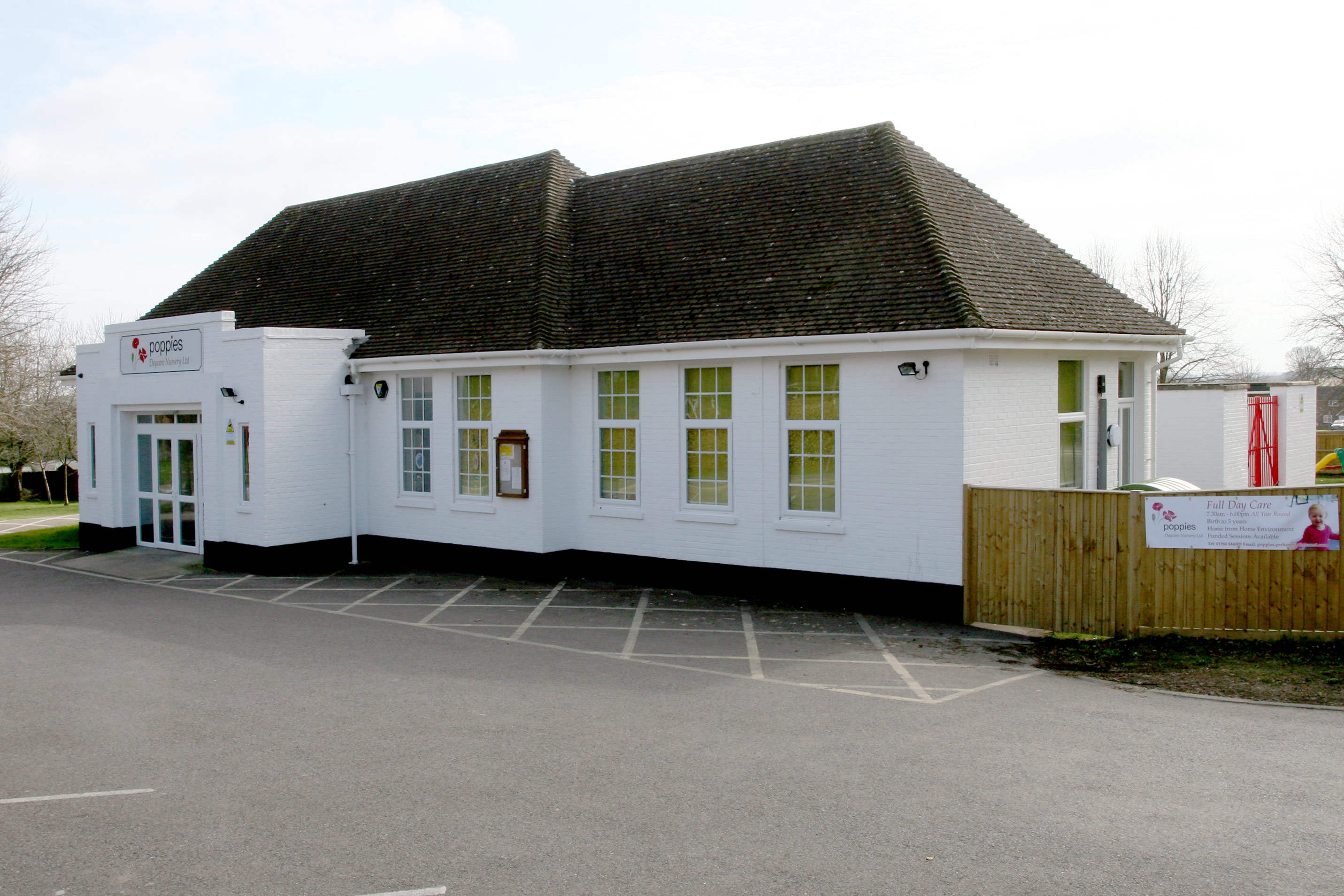
- Poppies Daycare Nursery in Perham Down

- Location within Wiltshire
- OS grid reference: SU258489
- Civil parish: Tidworth
- Unitary authority: Wiltshire
- Ceremonial county: Wiltshire
- Region: South West
- Country: England
- Sovereign state: United Kingdom
- Post town: Andover
- Postcode district: SP11
- Dialling code: 01980
- Police: Wiltshire
- Fire: Dorset and Wiltshire
- Ambulance: South Western
- UK Parliament: East Wiltshire

Perham Down is a village in Wiltshire, England, in Tidworth parish on the eastern edge of Salisbury Plain. It lies on a minor road about 1 1/2 miles (2.4 km) east of the town of Tidworth and 1 1/4 miles (2.0 km) southwest of the town of Ludgershall. The county border with Hampshire is nearby and the nearest large town is Andover, Hampshire, about 7 miles (11 km) to the southeast.

The main feature of the village is Perham Down Camp which was rebuilt between 1972 and 1974 and renamed Swinton Barracks at that time.

On Lamb Down to the south of the village is a linear earthwork, possibly a prehistoric boundary marker; it may have extended further north but that section would have been destroyed when the barracks were built.

For elections to Wiltshire Council, Perham Down falls within Ludgershall and Perham Down electoral division, electing one councillor. Boundary changes in 2020, effective from the 2021 election, place Perham within the Tidworth East & Ludgershall South division.
