= 30 Signal Regiment =

30th Signal Regiment
- Active: 1959 - Present
- Country: United Kingdom
- Branch: British Army
- Type: Signals
- Size: Five Squadrons
- Part of: 1st Signal Brigade
- Garrison/HQ: Gamecock Barracks, Bramcote
- Nickname: The Globetrotters
- Website: https://www.army.mod.uk/who-we-are/corps-regiments-and-units/royal-corps-of-signals/30-signal-regiment/

Commanders
- Current commander: Lt Col Terry Harrison

Insignia
- Cap Badge

- Tactical Recognition Flash

30th Signal Regiment is a unit of the Royal Corps of Signals within the British Army. The regiment is held at very high notice to move, and primarily supports Standing Joint Force Headquarters.

The Commanding Officer of 30th Signal Regiment is also the Commander Queen's Gurkha Signals (QGS).

== History ==
1951 - 5th Corps Signal Regiment

1956 - 90th Signal Regiment (Trials)

1959 - 30th Signal Regiment (Trials)

1967 - 30th Signal Regiment

30th Signal Regiment claims descent from 1st Middlesex Engineer Volunteers which became 2nd London Division Telegraph Company in 1908. In 1935, that unit became London Corps Signals TA and which evolved into V (5th) Corps Signals by 1942, only to be disbanded in 1946. To help support NATO forces in Germany, 5th Corps Signal Regiment was formed in 1951. The regiment moved to Cherry Tree Camp, Colchester, and was renumbered 90th Signal Regiment on 1 April 1956. It then moved to AAC Middle Wallop in November 1958. In 1959, it was redesignated 30th Signal Regiment.

The regiment moved to Blandford Camp on 21 March 1960 and absorbed 14th Signal Regiment on 1 November 1976. It remained at Blandford until the move to its present location at Gamecock Barracks, Bramcote, in November 1993.

The regiment sent detachments to British Guiana, Swaziland, Zambia, Kenya, Sarawak, Cyprus, Borneo, Aden, Bahrain, Aldabara Island, Benghazi, Sharjah and Anguilla during the 1960s.

=== Falklands War ===
During the Falklands War, 30 Signal Regiment set up a communications centre at the staging post on Ascension Island and provided Rear Link communications from most fighting units. By 1st June 1982, 5 Infantry Brigade HQ and Signal Squadron had landed at St Carlos using mainly Clansman radios. 30 Signal Regiment, with detachments from 1 Infantry Brigade and 19 Infantry Brigade Signal Squadrons, formed a unit to support the Land Forces HQ. 50 Signallers ran 15 nets on HMS Fearless which was the Main Force HQ. 30 Signal Regiment also provided satellite communications back to UK and secure telegraph for the two brigades.

=== Operations 1983-present ===
Since the Falklands War, the regiment has been involved in operations in:

Operation Hyperion, Beirut, 1983–1984

Operation Prosperous, Namibia, 1989–1990

Operation Granby, Gulf, 1990–1991

Operation Pinseeker, Kuwait, 1991

Operation Haven/Warden, Iraq/Turkey, 1991

Operation Hanwood/Cheshire, Croatia, 1992–1993

Operation Jural, Saudi Arabia, 1992

Operation Grapple/Lodestar, Croatia/Bosnia, 1992–1995

Operation Gabriel, Rwanda, 1994

Operation Chantress, Angola, 1995

Operation Purposeful, Uganda, 1996

Operation Determinant, Zaire, 1997

Operation Bolton, Kuwait, 1998

Operation Telic, Iraq

Operation Herrick, Afghanistan

In 2023, 256 and 258 Signal Squadrons deployed on Operation Polar Bear to No. 12 Downing Street (Foreign, Commonwealth, & Development Office), Cyprus, and Sudan to deliver a variety of support to enable command & control for a number of headquarters and deployed elements, which allowed an evacuation of 4387 people from Sudan during the War in Sudan (2023).

== Role ==
The regiment is part of 1st Signal Brigade, within the British-led NATO Allied Rapid Reaction Corps. The British Army describes the regiment as being "responsible for enabling PJHQ's deployable Joint Force Headquarters and supporting other High Readiness Formations such as the Very High Readiness Field Hospital, the Air Assault Task Force and Joint Aviation Command."

=== The regiment consists of ===
- 244 Signal Squadron (Air Support)
- 250 Gurkha Signal Squadron
- 256 Signal Squadron
- 258 Signal Squadron
- Support Squadron

== Freedoms and Affiliations ==
The regiment has a long association with The Worshipful Company of Dyers dating back to 1960.

The regiment has been granted the Freedom of Blandford, the Borough of Nuneaton and Bedworth and the Island of Alderney.
