= The Hemel Hempstead School =

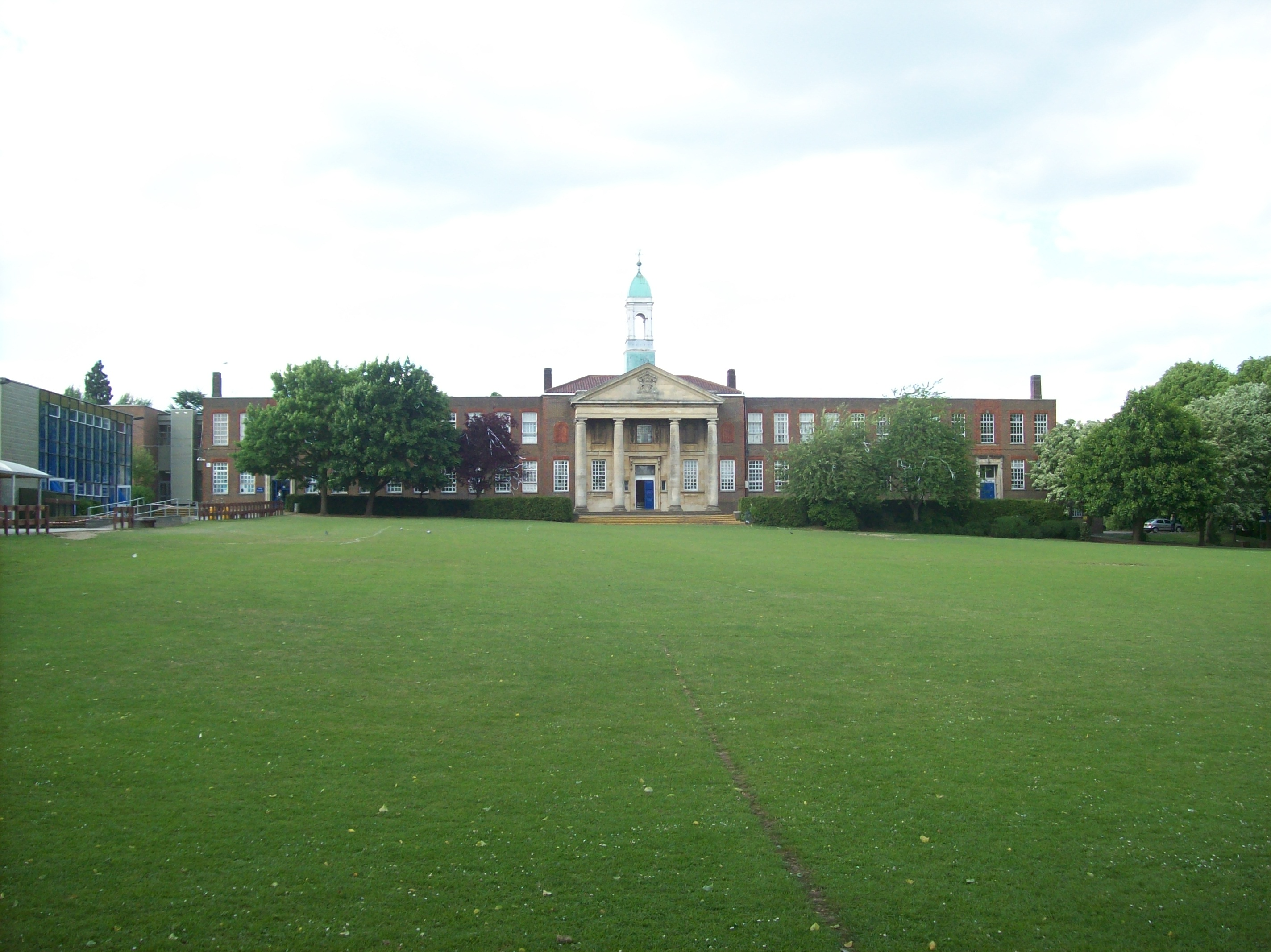

Location
- Heath Lane; Hemel Hempstead, Hertfordshire, HP1 1TX; England; 51°44′57″N 0°28′44″W

Information
- Type: Academy
- Motto: Esse Quam Videri (To be rather than to seem to be)
- Established: 1931
- Local authority: Hertfordshire
- Trust: Scholars' Education Trust
- Department for Education URN: 149500 Tables
- Ofsted: Reports
- Headteacher: Neil Hassell NPQH FCCT
- Gender: Coeducational
- Age: 11 to 18
- Enrolment: 1,259 as of March 2023
- Houses: Ashridge, Chalfont, Flaunden, Gaddesden, Latimer, Nettleden, Pendley
- Colours: Blue & gold
- Website: http://www.hhs.herts.sch.uk/

The Hemel Hempstead School is a coeducational secondary school and sixth form located in the town of Hemel Hempstead, Hertfordshire, England.

== History ==
=== Grammar school ===
The school was officially opened on 14 October 1931 as Hemel Hempstead Grammar School. It was opened by Lady Cicely Gore, the Marchioness of Salisbury and wife of James Gascoyne-Cecil, 4th Marquess of Salisbury. Another grammar school, the Apsley Grammar School, opened in the town in 1955.

The original Hemel Hempstead School building (known as 'Main Block' today) opened in 1931 along with a canteen and gymnasium block to the west and north of it. In the early 1960s an outdoor swimming pool was installed. In the latter half of the 1960s a new assembly hall, canteen, sports hall and changing rooms, and technology block were constructed. Work was completed shortly before the school became comprehensive. In the late 1960s, a 15th-century Grade II listed barn (called Heath Barn) to the south of the school fields was reconfigured and put back into use as a Music block.

=== Comprehensive ===
It became a comprehensive school in 1971, when schools in the town were reorganised.

In 1974 a "temporary" languages block was opened, which had been built on the land of the old canteen building which had been disused since 1969.

In 1990 a new Technology block was built adjacent to the swimming pool.

In 1999 the swimming pool was demolished and replaced with car parking. In the same year a new block containing Maths, Geography and ICT classrooms was constructed next to the old Sports hall, with 12 classrooms.

In 2004 a new Sixth Form block was completed, essentially an extension to the Main Block (but east of West Block), that replaces storage space.

In 2008 and 2010 new Drama and Food Technology blocks were opened.

Sometime around 2017, an astro turf playing field was completed on the site's southern grassland.

In 2019, the Heath Barn building was sold, with the music department moved to a newly built two-storey mixed use block commonly referred to as "North block". In May of the same year, a new sports hall was opened on the site of the old sports hall.

In 2021, a consultation was started for the demolition of West Block, the technology blocks, and the Chemistry block. This is to be replaced with a new building on the Northern school field.

In 2018 the school was chosen by Hertfordshire County Council to expand to meet the growing need in Hemel Hempstead for school places; this expansion included a £10m investment in sports, music, science and dining facilities.

In the academic year 2021-2022 the school celebrated its 90th anniversary with a series of events called 9 for 9000 for 90, including the publication of a school history. These events were organised by the senior prefects of charity who were responsible for raising money for charity.

=== Academy ===
Previously a foundation school administered by Hertfordshire County Council, in April 2023 The Hemel Hempstead School converted to academy status. The school is now sponsored by the Scholars' Education Trust.

== House system ==
The pupils are divided into one of the 7 house groups each named after local villages (with the exception of Ashridge, which is named after the Ashridge country estate).

- Ashridge (Green)
- Chalfont (Purple)
- Flaunden (Orange)
- Gaddesden (White)
- Latimer (Blue)
- Nettleden (Red)
- Pendley (Yellow)

The houses compete against each other to win annual events such as sports day, house drama/house art, house music/house dance, house science and house Christmas decorating competitions, as well as a house book challenge for Years 7 and 8, and a reading challenge for Years 7 through 9.

When the school was a grammar school, there were four Houses – Dacorum (Yellow), Salisbury (Blue), Tudor (Green), and Halsey (Red).

== Notable former pupils ==
=== Hemel Hempstead Grammar School ===
- Derrick Collier, sporting journalist, and production editor of the Sunday Times.
- Robert Burns, author, musician and associate professor in music 2001–2018 at the University of Otago
- Carl Dixon, air vice-marshal, commander from 2011 to 2014 of the Joint Helicopter Command, station commander from 2002 to 2004 of RAF Benson
- Les Ebdon, vice-chancellor of the University of Bedfordshire from 2003 to 2012, and former professor of analytical chemistry from 1986 to 2003 at the University of Plymouth
- Allan Ewing
- Bruce Grocott, Baron Grocott, Labour MP from 1974 to 1979 for Lichfield and Tamworth, from 1987 to 1997 for The Wrekin and from 1997 to 2001 for Telford
- Dale Sanders, professor of biology from 1992 to 2010 at the University of York
- Jean Marian Stevens, poet and teacher.
- Josephine Tewson, actress

=== The Hemel Hempstead School ===
- Matt Dickinson, film-maker
- Pallab Ghosh, a science correspondent for BBC News
- Richard Grayson, historian and political activist.

=== HHS sporting alumni ===
- Catherine Murphy, represented Great Britain in 2004 Olympic Games in Athens, competing in the 4 × 400 m relay.
- Jack Smith, professional footballer without a club since 2016 who has also represented Watford F.C. and Swindon Town F.C. and younger brother of Tommy W. Smith.
- Tommy W. Smith, retired professional footballer who has represented Watford, Derby County, Sunderland, Portsmouth, Queens Park Rangers, and Brentford
- Marc Bircham, ex-professional footballer who represented Millwall F.C., Queens Park Rangers and Yeovil Town.
- Ronnie Henry, Stevenage F.C. all time appearance holder.
- Cauley Woodrow currently playing for Wycombe Wanderers, has also represented England at under-21 level
- Ondine Achampong, British gymnast finished her time at HHS in 2022.
