= Nigel Colman =

Nigel Colman may refer to:

- Nigel Colman (politician) (1886–1966), British businessman and politician
- Nigel Colman (RAF officer) (born 1971), British retired Royal Air Force officer
