= David Niven (RAF officer) =

RAF officer

Air Vice-Marshal David Niven CB CBE
- Military career
- Allegiance: United Kingdom
- Branch: Royal Air Force
- Service years: 1968–2003
- Rank: Air Vice-Marshal
- Commands: Joint Helicopter Command; RAF Aldergrove; No. 78 Squadron; No. 18 Squadron
- Conflicts: Operation Banner; Falklands War; Gulf War
- Awards: Companion of the Order of the Bath; Commander of the Order of the British Empire; Queen's Commendation for Valuable Service

Air Vice-Marshal David Miller Niven, CB, CBE is a former Royal Air Force officer who served as the inaugural Commander of Joint Helicopter Command from 1999 to 2002.

== RAF career ==
Educated at the University of St Andrews, Niven joined the Royal Air Force (RAF) in 1968. He served as Commanding Officer of No. 18 Squadron and then No. 78 Squadron, before becoming Station Commander at RAF Aldergrove; he was air advisor to the Director SAS during the Falklands War in 1982 and Deputy Assistant Chief of Staff, Plans during the Gulf War in 1991.

Niven was a member of the implementation team to establish the Permanent Joint Headquarters at Northwood and then became the first commander of the new Joint Helicopter Command in October 1999 before retiring in January 2003.

Niven became Air Officer Northern Ireland on 1 September 2011 as a member of the Royal Air Force Volunteer Reserve.

Military offices
New command	Commander Joint Helicopter Command; 1999–2002	Succeeded by Paul Luker
