= MOD Stafford =

Ministry of Defence site in Stafford, in England

MOD Stafford Beacon Barracks
- Stafford, Staffordshire in England
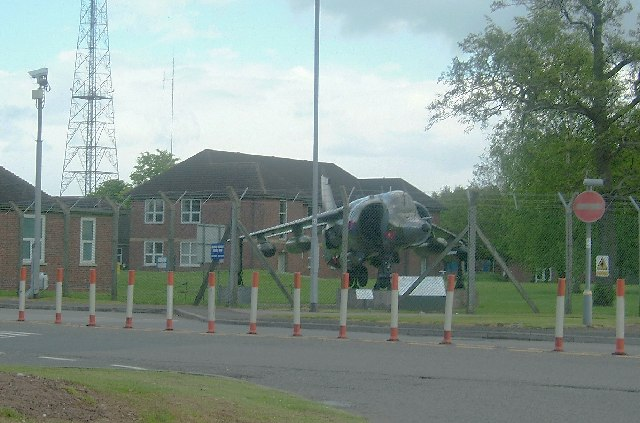
- Beacon Barracks' gate guardian is a Hawker Siddeley Harrier

Site information
- Type: Military barracks and support establishment
- Owner: Ministry of Defence
- Operator: British Army

Location
- Location within Staffordshire
- Coordinates: 52.824°N 2.099322°W
- Area: 165 hectares

Site history
- Built: 1938
- In use: 2006–present

Ministry of Defence Stafford otherwise known as MOD Stafford, Stafford Station or Beacon Barracks is a Ministry of Defence site in Stafford, in England. It was formerly Royal Air Force Stafford or more simply RAF Stafford, a non-flying Royal Air Force station.

== History ==
The station was originally established as the home of No. 16 Maintenance Unit in the 1930s. It became home to No 2 Mechanical Transport Squadron in 1958. The RAF Tactical Supply Wing was also formed at RAF Stafford in 1970 and operates still from MOD Stafford. An RAF Mountain Rescue Team was based at RAF Stafford.

== RAF Closure ==
In April 2004 it was announced that units from RAF Stafford would be moved to RAF Wittering, effectively closing the station. RAF Stafford officially ceased to be an RAF station on 31 March 2006 to become Beacon Barracks. However, as of July 2026, the RAF's "gate guardian" aircraft, a Harrier GR3 (pictured), remains in place.

Beacon Barracks was renamed from RAF Stafford in 2006, after the Royal Air Force moved out. In 2013, the British Government announced the redevelopment of the barracks, to allow 16 Signal Regiment to move there, in 2015.

== Based units ==
The following notable units are based at MOD Stafford.

=== British Army ===
Royal Corps of Signals

- 1st Signal Brigade
  - 16th Signal Regiment
    - 230 (Malaya) Signal Squadron
    - 247 (Gurkha) Signal Squadron
    - Support Squadron
  - 22nd Signal Regiment
    - 222 Signal Squadron
    - 242 (Gurkha) Signal Squadron
    - 248 (Gurkha) Signal Squadron
    - Support Squadron
  - 37th Signal Regiment
    - 48 Signal Squadron
      - 897 Troop
- Staffordshire & West Midlands (North Staffordshire) Army Cadet Force
  - As of March 2026, all ACF units at MOD Stafford have relocated to a dedicated joint cadet centre nearby the base.

=== Defence Equipment and Support (DE&S) ===
- DE&S Deca Stafford

=== Royal Air Force ===
Joint Aviation Command

- Tactical Supply Wing RAF

No. 22 Group (Training) RAF

- Royal Air Force Air Cadets
  - Staffordshire Wing Headquarters
  - As of March 2026, 395 (Stafford) Squadron RAFAC have relocated to a dedicated joint cadet centre nearby the base.
