= Mark Collier =

British businessman (born 1954)

- Born: May 17, 1954; Watford, Herts, UK
- Education: Berkhamsted School
- Occupations: CEO; Entrepreneur
- Years active: 1971 to 2025
- Employer(s): Fidelity Investments, Charles Schwab
- Known for: Corporate Leadership, Fintech Entrepreneurialism
- Parent: Derrick Collier

Mark Collier is a British former business executive and fintech entrepreneur, who served as CEO of Charles Schwab International before founding Investia and FundsHub.

== Career ==
In 1996, Collier resigned from his position at Fidelity to become CEO of Charles Schwab International. He was appointed to lead Schwab's European operations as part of a broader expansion strategy.

By the late 1990s, he was serving as President of Charles Schwab Europe, where he helped expand the firm's brokerage operations into the UK market. In 1998, he oversaw the launch of a touchtone trading platform designed to give UK retail investors access to automated share trading by phone - a first in the region at the time. Collier described the innovation as part of Schwab's aim to replicate its U.S. model in Europe.

Collier left Schwab in 1998 to co-found Investia Ltd, a UK-based financial technology company focused on mutual fund distribution. With a team of engineers from firms such as Sun Microsystems and Fidelity, Investia developed Javelin, a web-enabled platform designed to connect fund managers with banks and financial advisors. The system used a modular architecture with APIs and FIX-based messaging, enabling cross-border fund transactions for both retail and institutional markets.

In 2000, Investia partnered with Chase Manhattan Bank to create FundsHub, an outsourced investment platform for banks and insurers. Collier became chairman and CEO of the joint venture. The platform was described at the time as a strategic attempt to transform fund distribution in Europe by enabling financial institutions to offer online investment services under their own brands.

FundsHub was eventually acquired by JPMorgan Chase in 2002, which bought out Investia's stake in the platform. The transaction marked a successful exit for Investia and was reported in industry publications including Global Custodian.

In subsequent years, Investia continued developing technology products for investment processing. Collier was frequently quoted in the financial press, as well as making occasional appearances on TV news items as both a subject matter expert and guest.

== Later career ==
In later years, Collier held advisory and non-executive positions at several companies in the financial services and private equity sectors, including roles at Alexander Forbes, Assupol, Sigma Pensions, Bajaj Capital, XP Investimentos, and Duddell Street Acquisition Corp.
