= Lee Turner =

Air Vice-Marshal Lee Turner
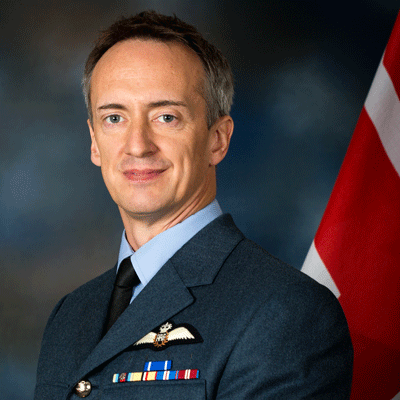
- Turner in 2018
- Military career
- Allegiance: United Kingdom
- Branch: Royal Air Force
- Rank: Air Vice-Marshal
- Commands: Joint Aviation Command; RAF Odiham
- Conflicts: War in Afghanistan

Air Vice-Marshal Lee Turner is a senior Royal Air Force officer who serves as commander, Joint Aviation Command.

== RAF career ==
After joining the Royal Air Force, Turner became commander No. 18(B) Squadron at RAF Odiham in 2013, Assistant Director Commitments and Chief of Staff at Joint Helicopter Command in 2015, and station commander of RAF Odiham and commander of the Chinook Force in September 2017. He went on to be Chief of Staff at Standing Joint Command in March 2022 and commander Joint Aviation Command in March 2026.

Military offices
| Preceded by Alastair Smith | Commander Joint Aviation Command; 2026–present | Incumbent |
