= Paul Luker =

Air Vice-Marshal Paul Luker CB OBE AFC DL
- Born: 8 July 1951 (age 75)
- Military career
- Allegiance: United Kingdom
- Branch: Royal Air Force
- Service years: 1968–2006
- Rank: Air Vice-Marshal
- Commands: Joint Helicopter Command; RAF Odiham; No. 7 Squadron
- Conflicts: Gulf War; Bosnian War; War in Afghanistan
- Awards: Companion of the Order of the Bath; Officer of the Order of the British Empire; Air Force Cross; Bronze Star Medal (United States)

Air Vice-Marshal Paul Douglas Luker (born 1951) CB, OBE, AFC, DL is a British former Royal Air Force officer who was Commander of Joint Helicopter Command from 2002 to 2005.

== RAF career ==
Luker joined the Royal Air Force (RAF) in 1968, trained as a support helicopter pilot and served in Hong Kong, Northern Ireland, the Persian Gulf, the Balkans and Belize. He became Officer Commanding No. 7 Squadron and then Station Commander at RAF Odiham. After attending the Royal College of Defence Studies, he went on to be Director of Overseas Military Activity at the Ministry of Defence in 1998 and then Commander of Joint Helicopter Command in 2002, and latterly served for seven months as Deputy Commanding General of the US-led coalition in Afghanistan before retiring in 2006.

== Other interests ==
From 2006 to 2016 Luker was Chief Executive of the Council of Reserve Forces' and Cadets' Associations, Secretary General of the UK Reserve Forces Association and, for the final five years acted as Clerk to the RFCA External Scrutiny Team, drafting their annual report to Parliament. He was Chairman of Blind Veterans UK from 2017 to 2021, and is a Deputy Lieutenant for Hampshire, and Honorary President of the Hampshire & Isle of Wight Wing of the Air Training Corps.

Military offices
Preceded by David Niven	Commander, Joint Helicopter Command; 2002–2005	Succeeded by Gary Coward
