= Derrick Collier =

English sports journalist (1923–2017)

- Born: 23 May 1923; Berkhamsted, Hertfordshire, UK
- Died: 14 February 2017 (aged 93); Banbury, Oxfordshire, UK
- Education: Hemel Hempstead Grammar School
- Occupations: Journalist; Editor; Author
- Years active: 1940 to 1988
- Employer(s): Allied/Kemsley Newspapers, News International
- Known for: Golf Journalism, Sports Journalism, Wapping Dispute
- Spouse: Beatrice Mary Collier (née Yiend)
- Children: Neil Collier; Mark Collier
- Writing career
- Pen name: Mark Neil; Robert Stoten; Derrick Collier
- Military career
- Allegiance: United Kingdom
- Branch: Royal Air Force
- Service years: 1942-1947
- Rank: AC1 Wireless Operator, AC2 Wireless Mechanic (Simultaneously held)
- Units: Chindits (on attachment); 230 Air-Sea Rescue

Derrick Collier (1923–2017) was an English sports journalist, editor and author, most well known for his role as production editor of the Sunday Times, where he played an important part in the Battle of Wapping. He joined the Daily Sketch newspaper as a trainee in 1940, a day after leaving school, and retired in 1988 having spent a continuous 48 years in the employment of Kemsley Newspapers and, after a takeover of The Times and Sunday Times by Rupert Murdoch, News International.

== Early life ==
Collier was born above a shop in Berkhamsted, Hertfordshire, in 1923, to Robert Collier, and Evelyn Stoten. He grew up in Apsley, Hertfordshire, initially attending a local school, before his parents paid for him to attend Hemel Hempstead Grammar School. He sang as a chorister in the local church. In his youth he was a somewhat successful school athlete and enthusiastic cricketer.

== World War II ==
Collier was too young to be conscripted at the outbreak of World War II, and commenced a career in journalism, initially as an operator in the tape-room, where incoming stories arrived telegraphically on paper tape, and were transcribed, assessed, and passed to journalists for inclusion in a newspaper where appropriate. During the Blitz, his office in Gray's Inn Road was bombed, after which production moved into the basement.

A remarkable incident occurred when Collier was tasked with naming all of the faces on a photograph of a conference of leaders of the dominions of the British Empire. After hitting a few dead ends, he resolved to solve the problem directly, by visiting the prime minister's office in Storey's Gate, behind Whitehall. Upon gaining entry, he became caught in a doorway with Winston Churchill.

"Who are you?" he demanded. The blast would have halted a regiment. he listened to my few words, held out his hand for the photograph and, with kindly understanding, said "Come over to the desk. I know them all."

We sat side by side. Churchill held the print up to the light and meticulously arrowed and labelled the faces his personal assistant had not known. Deliberately he wrote with unaccustomed clarity, so there would be no mistake with the spellings.

Finished, he leant back, looked at me, asked my name, age, laughed and said I was starting off in a great profession.

It was a cosy talk, great-uncle and grand-nephew chatter. Then, with a sharp rap at the door, a Royal Marine, all starch and blanco, stood in the middle of the carpet.

"Excuse me sir", he said. "Your armoured car is waiting outside". The war had started again.

Like his peers in the industry, Collier assiduously checked the Press Association tape machine for news of call-ups. When he discovered that he was due shortly to be called into the Army, he used this information to his advantage by instead enlisting "at will" as a wireless operator with the RAF, before the instruction could be published.

After basic training, and a number of rather easy-going postings at UK air-force bases, he was attached to the Chindits, who were planning a third expedition behind Japanese lines in the Burmese jungle. They were to fly in on gliders, and Collier was tasked with attaching his radio equipment to a mule, which was to be flown in with him. After rigorous training with this special operations unit, the expedition was cancelled due to the unexpected progress of the Fourteenth Army.

From there he was posted to the Air-Sea Rescue, and joined the crew of HSL 2685, a high-speed launch, initially operating around Akyab, before moving to Rangoon after it was taken from the Japanese. The crew led an unorthodox life, with little in the way of formality on board. After VJ Day the crew had little to do, and operated an illicit ferry and oil-trading business in their spare time.

== Sporting journalism ==
On returning from the war, later than most of this colleagues, Collier discovered that his employers were unwilling to give him his job back, as mandated by law. The company was already overstaffed with a combination of wartime new-joiners and earlier war-returnees. This was eventually resolved, and he shortly joined the new sports department, set up by John Graydon.

After working the greyhounds and the horses, Collier found his place in golf journalism. He would write stories for a number of the Kemsley newspapers nationwide, often employing the pseudonym "Robert Stoten" (based on his middle names) where a distinction from his real persona was required. This pen-name persisted throughout his career.

Collier mixed with all of the greats of the time, producing many exclusives by going out onto the fairway and hunting for stories, such as the "Ball in the Bottle" incident, and interviews with the likes of Ben Hogan.

In addition to golfing stars, Collier became a close friend of Freddie Mills, leading him onstage for his appearance on the television programme This Is Your Life.

Collier was made Sports Editor for Kemsley, the youngest person to hold the post on Fleet Street, before moving to the Sunday Times and taking the role of Deputy Sports Editor, and Sports Production Editor.

Alan Gibson opined that Collier's tenure was marked by excellent coverage, albeit at the cost of a reduction in the depth of the articles in the sports section of the Sunday Times:

'I cherish a remark made to me by Derrick Collier, who had as much to do as anyone with their sports pages revolution. I was to be at a cricket match: close of play seven or thereabouts. "Four hundred words at four o'clock, Alan. And remember it must be a rounded, comprehensive piece." But they have produced notable journalism in word and picture, and during the stoppage the loss I most often heard bewailed was that of the Sunday Times sport.'

== Production editor of the Sunday Times ==
From his position as Sports Production Editor, Collier later became Production Editor for the Sunday Times in toto.

To attempt to improve the editorial performance in the composing room and to strengthen relations between the editorial and production management, the board, through its production director, asked the editor to appoint a full time production editor on the paper, and he nominated me. The reason for this was that I knew the composing room, with its readers, the process, and stereo, who took the forms to produce the flongs for plate-making, better than anyone else, having been around with them for so many years.

— When Said and Done (p.274)

The role played to his strengths, and by this point he had become, in his own words, although with some reserve, "the doyen of the Sunday Times".

One colleague said of him: "He was rather scary on the press floor in the hot metal days until you realised what a decent man he was. He was the type of bloke that made you really feel you were on a newspaper."

— Obituary, Sports Journalists' Association

== Wapping dispute ==
During this period relations with the print trade unions became increasingly fractious, and in 1981, after one prolonged strike - an eleven-month closure - the owners of the paper became tired of the constant struggle, and sold it, along with The Sun and others, to Rupert Murdoch and News International. Murdoch quickly set about modernising the newspapers, and Collier was sent to the United States and Finland to learn about modern compositing and printing technologies which had not been taken up in Fleet Street, largely as a result of the intransigence of the unions.

Despite some initial progress, it was clear that wholesale change would be needed. Murdoch set about building a new "plant" for the production of his newspapers, entirely secretly, with a cover story that he was thinking of launching a new paper. Key members of the team "went on holiday" or "went off sick", and shortly afterwards, Collier made the move as well.

Eventually, production was moved to the new site, resulting in massive demonstrations and riots, which lasted for years. Collier was instrumental in getting the paper out at the new premises:

When the paper moved to Wapping, in 1986, there was pressure on Collier to get the paper out on time and the proprietor, Rupert Murdoch, went down to the press floor to make sure the deadline was met. When Murdoch asked Collier what he required, Collier replied: “If you get out the way we can get the paper finished.” There were no hard feelings.

— Obituary in The Times

The words in this account have been considerably softened up, if the alternate version in Collier's autobiography is anything to go by. The battle raged outside, and whilst most of the staff were ferried into the site in an armoured bus, Collier took the position that he had consciously made the decision to move, and that he would look the protestors, his former colleagues, in the face:

"But Derrick Collier had taken the decision to walk come rain or shine the three quarters of a mile from Tower Bridge tube station, down The Highway to Pennington Street where the plant had its entrance. I was usually spotted coming down the road on the pavement on the opposite side of the road to the unofficial pickets, and when I was something like 100 yards from them the cat calls and chanting would start. "Collier the scab, Collier the scab", plus a vast and varied choice of four letter word insults. The tirade reached a peak when I was plumb opposite to them and gradually died down as I came face to face with the official picket line. I became accustomed to the ritual so much so that I treated the confrontation with a sense of humour to the extent of giving the "royal wave" as I walked in front of the crowd, and at the same time offered them a hearty "Good morning all". I never ever knew the reaction to this bravado, or Collier showmanship, but in the office one day Andrew Neil, the editor, said, "I saw you make your usual grand entrance this morning". Obviously, it didn't go unnoticed."

— When Said and Done (p. 305–306)

Collier continued at the Sunday Times until the end of his career, but never became fully comfortable with the change in journalistic culture brought about by the new technology. He retired following a sumptuous bash at The Oval, attended by Murdoch.

== Books and ghost-writing ==
During spare time, and particularly down-time on the papers due to strikes, Collier supplemented his income through freelance work, typically as a ghost-writer or pseudonymous author. These included football annuals, a golfing handbook, and a string of promotional books for the Milk Marketing Board. He also ghost-wrote the newspaper columns of the golfer Dai Rees.
