= 97 Signal Squadron (Volunteers) =

97 (BRITFOR) Signal Squadron (Volunteers) was a Territorial Army(now Army Reserve) squadron in the Royal Corps of Signals in the British Army. The squadron comprised personnel from other TA signals units who had volunteered for an operational tour in support of British Army peacekeeping operations (BRITFOR) in the Balkans under EUFOR Althea and KFOR.

The original deployment was in the winter of 2001, and was the first major deployment overseas of a Territorial Army unit overseas since the Second World War.
