= Alastair Smith (RAF officer) =

Air Vice-Marshal Alastair Smith CB
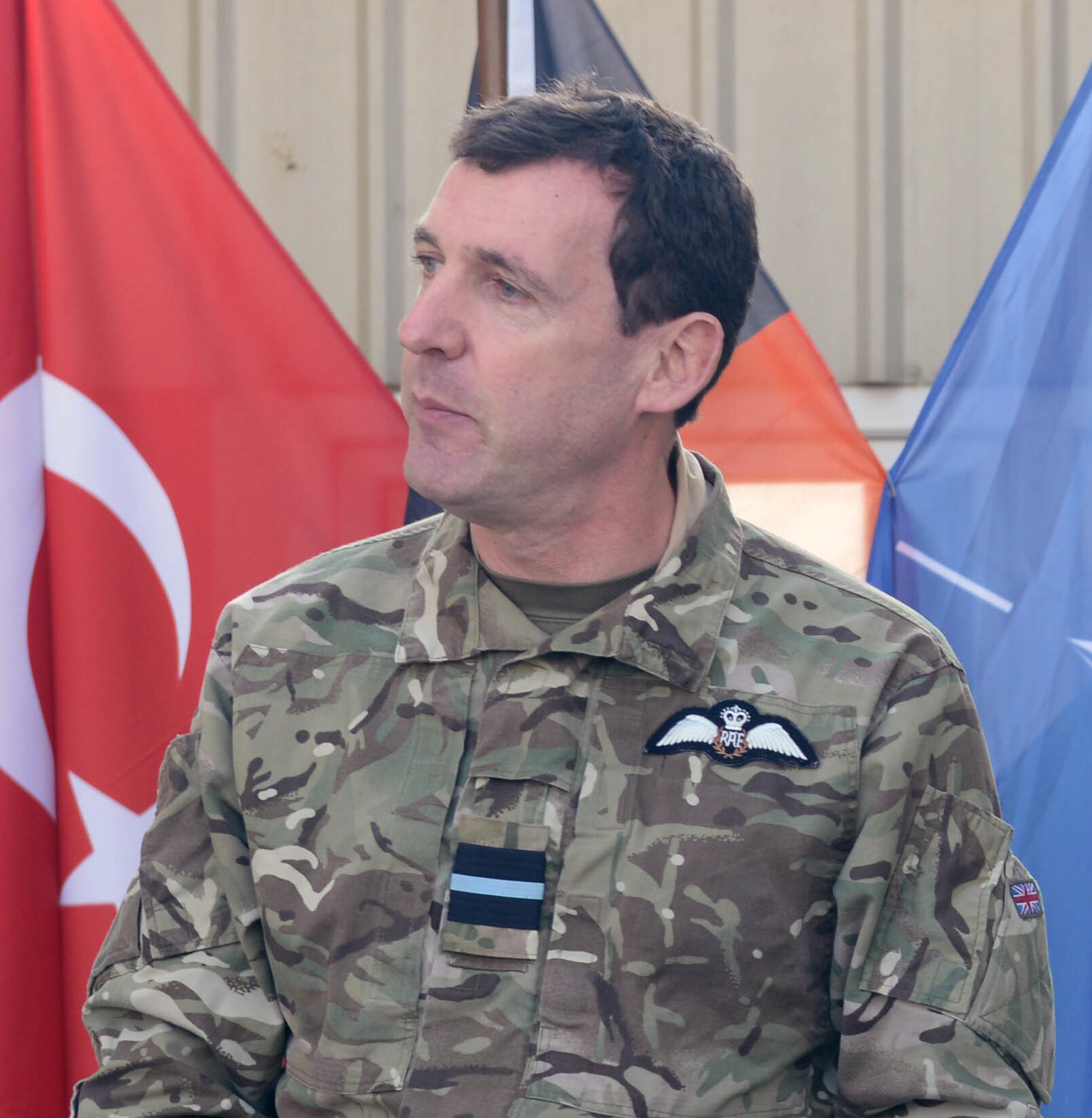
- Smith in 2017
- Military career
- Allegiance: United Kingdom
- Branch: Royal Air Force
- Service years: 1990–present
- Rank: Air Vice-Marshal
- Commands: Joint Aviation Command; RAF Shawbury
- Conflicts: War in Afghanistan
- Awards: Companion of the Order of the Bath; Officer of the Legion of Merit (United States)

Air Vice-Marshal Alastair Peter Thomas Smith, CB is a senior Royal Air Force officer who served as commander, Joint Aviation Command from 2023 to 2026.

== RAF career ==
Smith was commissioned into the Royal Air Force (RAF) on 20 April 1990. From 2014 to 2015, he was commanding officer of RAF Shawbury. From October 2016 to April 2017, he served as deputy commander of NATO Air Command, Afghanistan.

He became Assistant Chief of Staff (Military Strategy and Defence Engagement) in August 2020. In March 2023 he was appointed commander, Joint Helicopter Command, which became Joint Aviation Command in May 2024, and served there until March 2026.

Smith was appointed a Companion of the Order of the Bath (CB) in the 2025 Birthday Honours.

Military offices
Preceded by Nigel Coleman	Commander Joint Aviation Command; 2023–2026	Succeeded by Lee Turner
