= Tactical Supply Wing RAF =

Tactical Supply Wing
- Squadron badge
- Active: 1970 – present
- Country: United Kingdom
- Branch: Royal Air Force
- Type: Non-flying unit
- Role: Helicopter support
- Part of: Joint Aviation Command
- Station: MOD Stafford (Beacon Barracks)
- Nickname: Tiswas
- Motto: Support to strike

Commanders
- Inaugural commander: Group Captain Craven-Griffiths

The Tactical Supply Wing (TSW) is a helicopter support unit of the Royal Air Force, based at MOD Stafford (also known as Beacon Barracks) in Staffordshire. The wing specialises in the refuelling of helicopters in the field.

== History ==
The Tactical Supply Wing concept was devised by Group Captain Craven-Griffiths, who developed the idea during his time at the Ministry of Defence in London during the late 1960s. Griffiths and colleagues spent many hours discussing the concept in The Old Shades public house, located on Whitehall. Ever since, the Old Shades has been considered as the birthplace of the TSW.

The TSW, nicknamed "Tiswas" (a word meaning "a state of nervous agitation or confusion ... physical disorder or chaos", attested from 1960 by the OED), was formed at RAF Stafford in late 1970 and became operational in January 1971. TSW was sent on its first operational deployment to Northern Ireland in 1971. Elements of TSW have deployed around the world to support British and NATO helicopter units in most major exercises and conflicts since it was formed.

== Role and operations ==
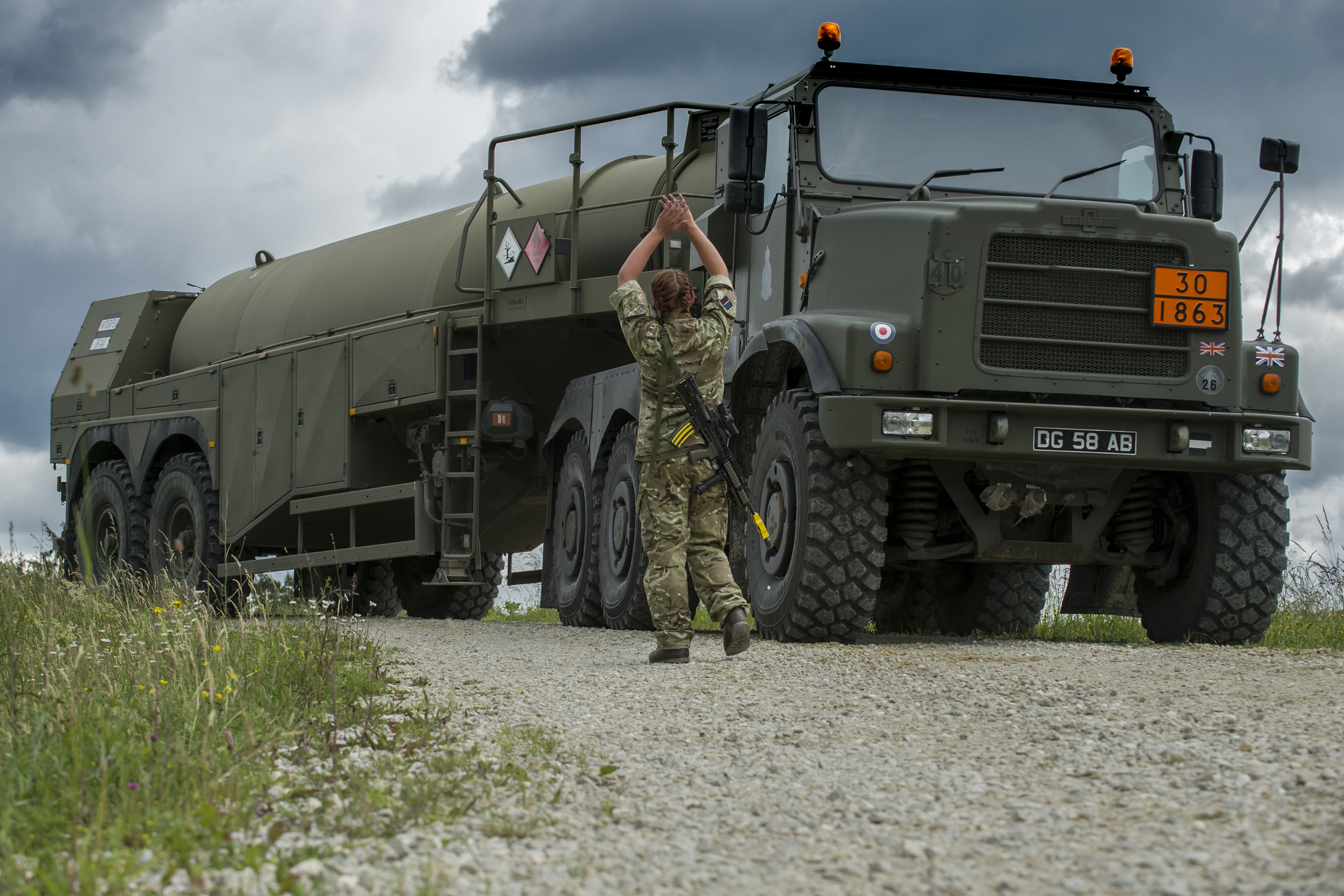
An Oshkosh Wheeled Refueller vehicle operated by the RAF Tactical Supply Wing.

The RAF Tactical Supply Wing (TSW) is a highly specialized, mobile unit that provides immediate, front-line aviation fuel support to battlefield helicopters and, occasionally, fixed-wing aircraft. Based in Stafford, they operate in austere, contested environments to perform

"rotors-running" refuelling, ensuring aircraft can quickly return to operations. Wikipedia +4 Key responsibilities and capabilities include: • Rotors-Running Refuelling (RRR): Refuelling helicopters while engines are running to minimize time on the ground. • Tactical Fuel Deployment: Setting up, operating, and maintaining temporary fuel storage (e.g., pillow tanks, bowsers) and delivery systems in field locations. • Operational Support: Supporting joint operations, including working with Army and Marine units in forward operating bases. • Rapid Response: Deploying on short notice to support helicopter operations globally, often in high-risk areas. • Aircraft Recovery: Assisting in the refuelling or defuelling of stranded or unserviceable aircraft. Wikipedia +5 TSW personnel are trained to operate in, and adapt to, challenging rapidly changing environments.

The unit is still at Stafford, but the base is now called Beacon Barracks. It also houses 22 Signal Regiment and 16 Signal Regiment.

== Heritage ==
The wing's badge, awarded in March 1992, features a Peregrine falcon in a flying position, against a background of a three-arched bridge and a body of water. The aggressive falcon with its wings fully extended resonates with a “Supply Wing” whereas the bridge represents communication and is portrayed with three arches, which is a reference to three RAF commands and all three services of the British Armed Forces.

The wing's motto is Support to Strike, acknowledging its support role which supports combat operations.
