= Jean Marian Stevens =

British Poet

- Born: Jean Marian Baxter; 27 July 1928 Newport Pagnell, Buckinghamshire, United Kingdom
- Died: 21 March 2022 (aged 93) United Kingdom
- Occupation: Poet; writer; playwright; teacher
- Language: English
- Education: Hockerill Teacher Training College, 1948
- Notable awards: Marjorie Bowen Award 1949, 1950; Julia Cairns Salver for Poetry 1974, 1991, 1996; Dacorum Poet of the year 1974

Jean Marian Stevens (née Baxter; 1928–2022) was a British poet, writer, playwright and teacher.

== Early life and education ==
Jean Marian Stevens was born on the 27 July 1928 in Newport Pagnell. Stevens grew up in Boxmoor, Hemel Hempstead and attended the then Hemel Hempstead Grammar School.

Stevens was educated at Hockerill Teacher Training College, a former Church of England teacher training college for women, in Bishop Stortford. In 1948, Steven's graduated with a specialism in teaching English and Religious studies.

== Career ==
From 1948–1956, Stevens was a teacher in Bedfordshire and Hertfordshire.

In 1949, Stevens' won the Marjorie Bowen Award at the Society of Women Writers and Journalists Literary Festival. Stevens won again in 1950 and joined the Society the same year.

Stevens served on the Society's Council as Poetry Representative from 1980 to 2000, Chairman from 1983 to 1985, Vice-President, as well as Acting Secretary and Competitions Coordinator.

Two of Steven's works Led by kingfishers and Impressions : collected poems are held in the National Poetry Library.

== Awards ==
Steven's was awarded the Society of Women Writers and Journalists Julia Cairns Salver for Poetry in 1974, 1991 and 1996. In 1974, Stevens won the Dacorum Poet of the year.

== Personal life ==
In 1954, Stevens married David Stevens (1929–2019) and together have 3 children. Stevens died on World Poetry Day 2022 aged 93.

== Publications ==
- Stevens, Jean Marian (1989). "Conformers and Dissenters". In Hands, Roger; Hands, Joan; Davis, Eve (eds.). Book of Boxmoor. Buckingham: Barracuda Books. pp. 33–40. ISBN 0860234193.

=== Poetry ===
- Stevens, Jean Marian (1980). Led by kingfishers. Walton-on-Thames: Outposts Publications.
- Stevens, Jean Marian (1989). "Starling Song". In Lewis-Smith, Anne; Morland, Nicola (eds.). ENVOI SUMMER ANTHOLOGY. Pen Ffordd: Envoi Poets. p. 96. ISBN 0948478 50 0.
- Stevens, Jean Marian (1992). "Fritillaries". In Walton, Rachael (ed.). Spring Bouquet. Peterborough: Arrival Press. p. 92. ISBN 1-85786-100-0.
- Smith, John Owen, ed. (1994). Anthology of the Phoenix Poets: Commemorative Edition 1972-94. ISBN 1-873855-10-9.
- Stevens, Jean Marian (2000). "Battle Honours". In Ashby, Gwynneth; Bowden, Jean; Cross, Beryl; Marshall, Fay (eds.). Tessellation. London; Haywards Heath: Society of Women Writers & Journalists; Gemini Publications. p. 15.
- Stevens, Jean Marian (2002). Impressions : collected poems. St. Albans: Penna Press. ISBN 0950411388.
