= Tony Johnstone-Burt =

Royal Navy Vice Admiral (born 1958)

Vice Admiral Sir Tony Johnstone-Burt KCVO CB OBE DL
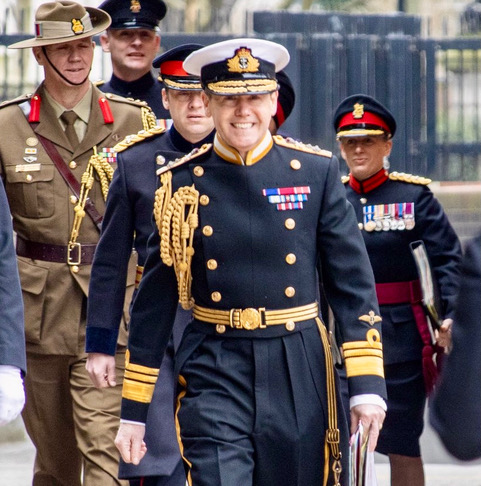
- Johnstone-Burt in 2023
- Born: Charles Anthony Johnstone-Burt; 1 February 1958 (age 68)
- Military career
- Allegiance: United Kingdom
- Branch: Royal Navy
- Service years: 1977–2013
- Rank: Vice Admiral
- Commands: Joint Helicopter Command; Scotland, Northern England and Northern Ireland; HMS Ocean; Royal Naval College, Dartmouth; 6th Frigate Squadron; HMS Montrose; HMS Brave
- Conflicts: Falklands War; War in Afghanistan
- Awards: Knight Commander of the Royal Victorian Order; Companion of the Order of the Bath; Officer of the Order of the British Empire
- Other work: Master of the Household

Vice Admiral Sir Charles Anthony Johnstone-Burt, KCVO, CB, OBE, DL (born 1 February 1958) is a retired Royal Navy officer who is currently serving as the Master of the Household. In this role, he took part in the 2023 Coronation.

== Education ==
Johnstone-Burt was educated at Wellington College and Van Mildert College at Durham University, where he took joint honours in Psychology and Anthropology in 1980.

== Naval career ==
Johnstone-Burt joined the Royal Navy in 1977. Promoted to lieutenant in January 1982, served in HMS Active during the Falklands War. He qualified as a helicopter pilot in 1983 flying Sea Kings and Lynx helicopters. He qualified as a principal warfare officer and served in several frigates before being appointed as first lieutenant and second-in-command of HMS Scylla in 1991. He was appointed commanding officer of HMS Brave in 1994 and went on to study at the United States Naval War College, where courses are affiliated with Salve Regina University in Rhode Island, taking a Master of Arts degree in International Relations from 1996 to 1997. He also attended the Higher Command and Staff Course at the Joint Services Command and Staff College in 2000.

Johnstone-Burt was appointed commanding officer of HMS Montrose and Captain of the 6th Frigate Squadron in 2000 before becoming Commodore of the Royal Naval College, Dartmouth in 2002 and then Captain of HMS Ocean in 2004. He went on to be Deputy Commander and Chief of Staff of the Joint Helicopter Command in 2005, Flag Officer, Scotland, Northern England and Northern Ireland in 2006, and Commander of the Joint Helicopter Command in 2008 before being appointed Director of Counter Narcotics and International Organised Crime at Headquarters International Security Assistance Force in Kabul, Afghanistan in 2011. Promoted to vice admiral, he became the Chief of Staff to NATO's Supreme Allied Command Transformation at Norfolk, Virginia, in November 2011 and held this post until October 2013 when he retired from the Service.

Johnstone-Burt was appointed a Companion of the Order of the Bath (CB) in the 2013 New Year Honours, and Knight Commander of the Royal Victorian Order (KCVO) in the 2020 Birthday Honours.

In 2013, Johnstone-Burt became the Master of the Household to the Sovereign. In this role, he took part in the 2023 Coronation.

He was a member of the Board of Governors of Monkton Combe School from 2004. He was also a member of the Board of Governors and Chair at Haberdashers' Aske's School for Girls from 2014 to 2018. He was appointed as a Deputy Lieutenant of the County of Dorset on 22 August 2016; this gave him the post-nominal letters "DL" for life. In 2025, Johnstone-Burt became a Visiting Fellow at the University of Oxford Centre for Corporate Reputation, an honorary position awarded to people whose work is deemed to be of high quality and relevance to the research mission of the University of Oxford.

Military offices
Preceded by Philip Wilcocks	Flag Officer, Scotland, Northern England and Northern Ireland; 2006–2008	Succeeded by Sir Philip Jones
Preceded by Gary Coward	Commander, Joint Helicopter Command; 2008–2011	Succeeded by Carl Dixon
Court offices
Preceded by Sir David Walker	Master of the Household; 2013–	Incumbent
