= Gary Coward =

British Army general

Lieutenant General Sir Gary Coward KBE CB
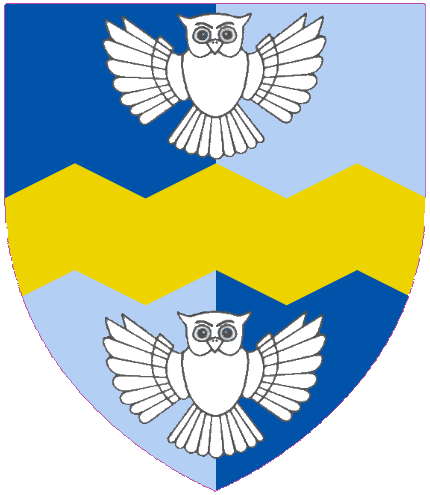
- Born: 26 August 1955 (age 71)
- Military career
- Allegiance: United Kingdom
- Branch: British Army
- Service years: 1974–2012
- Rank: Lieutenant General
- Service number: 497393
- Unit: Army Air Corps
- Commands: 1 Regiment Army Air Corps and Joint Helicopter Command
- Conflicts: Bosnian War
- Awards: Knight Commander of the Order of the British Empire; Companion of the Order of the Bath

Lieutenant General Sir Gary Robert Coward, KBE, CB (born 26 August 1955) is a retired senior British Army officer, who served as Chief of Materiél (Land) and Quartermaster-General to the Forces from September 2009 until his retirement in May 2012.

== Military career ==
Coward was commissioned into the Royal Artillery in 1974, but transferred to the Army Air Corps in 1983. In 1995 he was deployed to the Bosnia and was appointed Officer of the Order of the British Empire for his service there. He provided daily briefings on television from Sarajevo during the conflict.

He was appointed Director of Equipment Capability at the Ministry of Defence in 2003, and then moved on to be Commander Joint Helicopter Command in 2005. In 2007 he moved on again to be Chief of Staff at Permanent Joint Headquarters in Northwood. He was appointed Companion of the Order of the Bath in the 2008 Queen's Birthday Honours.

In September 2009 he was made Chief of Materiel (Land) and Quartermaster-General.

He was appointed Knight Commander of the Order of the British Empire (KBE) in the 2012 Birthday Honours.

Coat of arms of Gary Coward

Crest
On a Helm with a Wreath Argent Bleu Celeste and Azure Out of a Mural Crown Or a Rhino's head Azure armed with two Horns Bleu Celeste in the mouth a Rose Argent.
Torse
Bleu Celeste and Azure lined Argent.
Escutcheon
Quarterly Azure and Bleu Celeste a Bar indented of three points upwards Or between two Owls volant affronty Argent.
Motto
Aperius Honestus Et Perspicuus
Badge
A Sword point downwards Argent the hilt pommel and quillons Or the blade surmounted by a Rose Argent barbed and seeded Or

Military offices
Preceded by Paul Luker	Commander, Joint Helicopter Command; 2005–2008	Succeeded by Tony Johnstone-Burt
Preceded by Dick Applegate	Quartermaster-General to the Forces; 2009–2012	Succeeded by Christopher Deverell
