= Royal Corps of Signals =

Communications arm of the British Army

- Cap Badge of the Royal Corps of Signals during the reign of Elizabeth II
- Active: 1920 – present
- Allegiance: United Kingdom
- Branch: British Army
- Garrison/HQ: Blandford Camp, Dorset
- Mottos: Certa Cito (Swift and Sure)
- March: Begone Dull Care (Quick); HRH The Princess Royal (Slow)

Commanders
- Colonel-in-Chief: Anne, Princess Royal
- Colonel Commandant: Major-General Mark R. Purves
- Master of Signals: Lieutenant-General Paul Raymond Griffiths, CB
- Corps Colonel: Colonel Ed Swift

Insignia
- Tactical Recognition Flash

The Royal Corps of Signals (often simply known as the Royal Signals – abbreviated to R SIGNALS) is one of the combat support arms of the British Army. Signals units are among the first into action, providing the battlefield communications and information systems essential to all operations. Royal Signals units provide the full telecommunications infrastructure for the Army wherever they operate in the world. The Corps has its own engineers, logistics experts and systems operators to run radio and area networks in the field. It is responsible for installing, maintaining and operating all types of telecommunications equipment and information systems, providing command support to commanders and their headquarters, and conducting electronic warfare against enemy communications.

== History ==
=== Origins ===
In 1870, 'C' Telegraph Troop, Royal Engineers, was founded under Captain Montague Lambert. The Troop was the first formal professional body of signallers in the British Army and its duty was to provide communications for a field army by means of visual signalling, mounted orderlies and telegraph. By 1871, 'C' Troop had expanded in size from 2 officers and 133 other ranks to 5 officers and 245 other ranks. In 1879, 'C' Troop first saw action during the Anglo-Zulu War. On 1 May 1884, 'C' Troop was amalgamated with the 22nd and 34th Companies, Royal Engineers, to form the Telegraph Battalion Royal Engineers; 'C' Troop formed the 1st Division (Field Force, based at Aldershot) while the two Royal Engineers companies formed the 2nd Division (Postal and Telegraph, based in London). Signalling was the responsibility of the Telegraph Battalion until 1908, when the Royal Engineers Signal Service was formed. As such, it provided communications during the First World War. It was about this time that motorcycle despatch riders and Wireless sets were introduced into service.

=== Royal Warrant ===
A Royal Warrant for the creation of a Corps of Signals was signed by the Secretary of State for War, Winston Churchill, on 28 June 1920. Six weeks later, King George V conferred the title Royal Corps of Signals.

=== Subsequent history ===
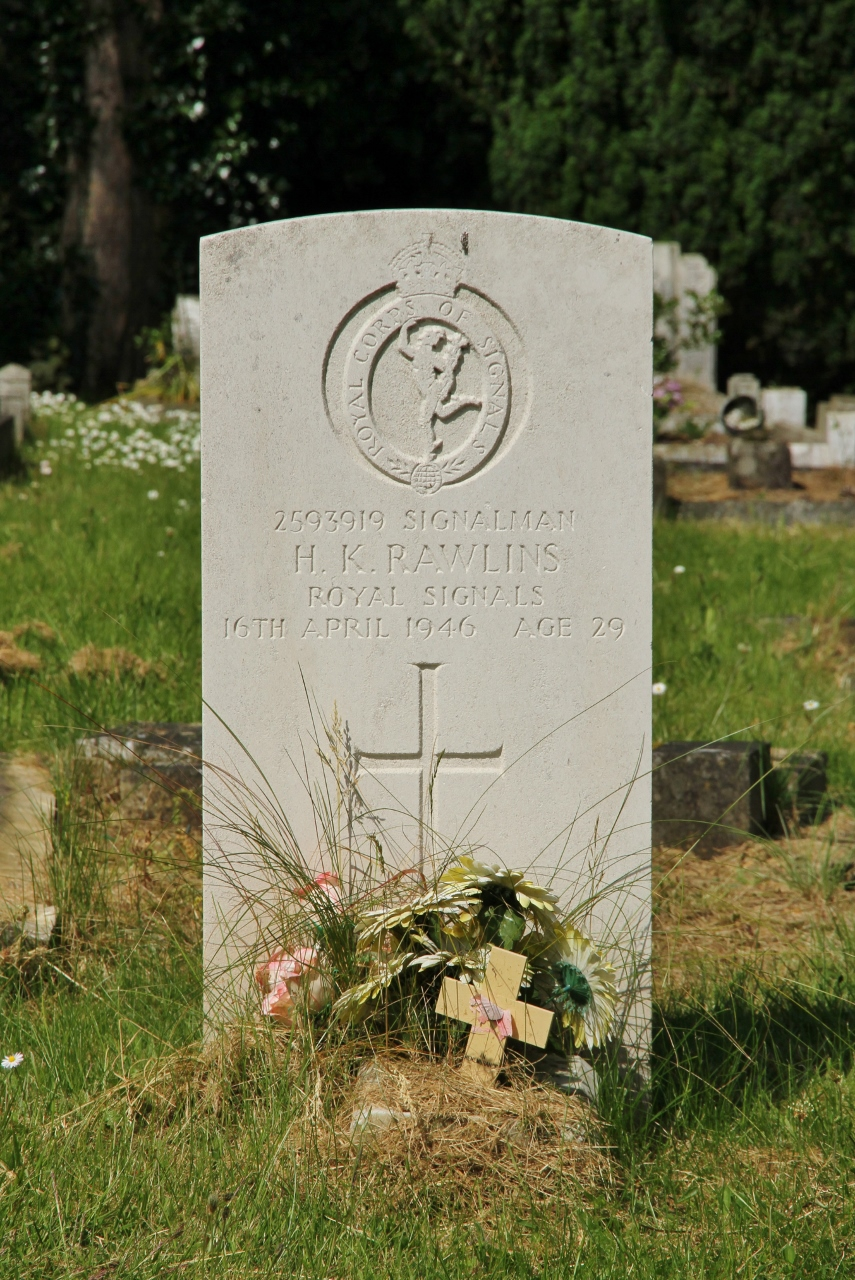
Gravestone in Rose Hill Cemetery, Oxford of Signalman Henry Rawlins, Royal Corps of Signals, who died in 1946

Before the Second World War, Royal Signals recruits were required to be at least 5 feet 2 inches tall. They initially enlisted for eight years with the colours and a further four years with the reserve. They trained at the Signal Training Centre at Catterick Camp and all personnel were taught to ride.

During the Second World War (1939–45), members of the Royal Corps of Signals served in every theatre of war. In one notable action, Corporal Thomas Waters of the 5th Parachute Brigade Signal Section was awarded the Military Medal for laying and maintaining the field telephone line under heavy enemy fire across the Caen Canal Bridge during the Allied invasion of Normandy in June 1944.

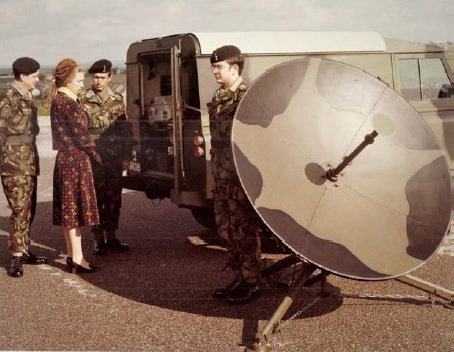
A Land Rover-based VSC 501 being shown to Princess Anne at Blandford Camp by 30th Signal Regiment

In the immediate post-war period, the Corps played a full and active part in numerous campaigns including Palestine, the Indonesia-Malaysia confrontation, Malaya and the Korean War. Until the end of the Cold War, the main body of the Corps was deployed with the British Army of the Rhine confronting Soviet Bloc forces, providing the British Forces' contribution to NATO with its communications infrastructure. Soldiers from the Royal Signals delivered communications in the Falklands War in 1982 and the first Gulf War in 1991.

In 1994, The Royal Corps of Signals moved its training regiments, 11th Signal Regiment (the Recruit Training Regiment) and 8th Signal Regiment (the Trade Training School), from Catterick Garrison to Blandford Camp.

In late 2012, 2nd (National Communications) Signal Brigade was disbanded. Soldiers from the Royal Corps of Signals saw extensive service during the eight years of the Iraq War before withdrawal of troops in 2011, and the 13 years of the War in Afghanistan before it ended in 2014.

Under Army 2020 Refine a number of changes planned for the Corps were made public in 2013–14. A presentation by the Master of Signals indicated that 16 Signal Regiment would shift from 11 Signal Brigade to 1 Signal Brigade and focus on supporting communications for logistic headquarters. Similarly, 32 and 39 Signal Regiments were planned to shift to 1 Signal Brigade. 15 Signal Regiment would no longer be focused on Information Systems but would support 12th Armoured Infantry Brigade, while 21 and 2 Signal Regiments were planned to support the 1st and second Strike Brigades respectively. Furthermore, a new regiment, 13th Signal Regiment, was planned to form up under 1st Intelligence, Surveillance and Reconnaissance Brigade and work with 14th Signal Regiment on cyber and electromagnetic activity.

In 2017 the Royal Signals Motorcycle Display Team, then in its 90th year, was disbanded; senior officers had complained that it "failed to reflect the modern-day cyber communication skills in which the Royal Signals are trained".

On 28 June 2020, the Royal Corps of Signals marked the 100th anniversary of its foundation. Constrained by COVID-19 rules, many Royal Signals 100 celebrations were organised online, including the #100for100 challenge that involved hundreds of members of the Corps running 100 km for the Royal Signals Charity. The Princess Royal, the Colonel-In-Chief of the Corps, delivered a video message of congratulations, and the Foreman of Signals Course students successfully took a photograph of the Royal Signals 100 badge in space, completing a challenge that was set for them.

== Personnel ==
=== Training and trades ===
Royal Signals officers receive general military training at the Royal Military Academy Sandhurst, followed by specialist communications training at the Royal School of Signals, Blandford Camp, Dorset. Other ranks are trained both as field soldiers and tradesmen. Their basic military training is delivered at the Army Training Regiment at Winchester or Army Training Centre Pirbright before undergoing trade training at 11th (Royal School of Signals) Signal Regiment. There are currently six different trades available to other ranks, each of which is open to both men and women:

- Information Services Engineer: trained in programming, database, web and app development, data communications and computer networks
- Networks Engineer: trained in data communications, computer networks, military radio and trunk communications systems
- Infrastructure Engineer: trained in installing and repairing fibre optic and copper voice and data networks in both internal and external environments
- Power Engineer: trained to prepare, engineer and maintain complex Power Distribution Systems worldwide
- Supply Chain Operative: trained in all aspects of logistics, including driving, warehouse management and accounting
- Electronic Warfare & Signals Intelligence Operative: trained to intercept voice and data communications, to provide tactical electro-magnetic, cyber and signals intelligence on the battlefield and close tactical support to and advice to bomb disposal units

On selection for promotion to Sergeant, soldiers may choose to volunteer for selection to a Supervisory roster. Currently there are 4 Supervisor roles:

- Yeoman of Signals – trained in the planning and deployment and management of military tactical/strategic communications networks;
- Yeoman of Signals (Electronic Warfare) – trained in the planning, deployment and management of military tactical/strategic electronic warfare assets;
- Foreman of Signals – trained in the installation, maintenance, repair and interoperability of military tactical/strategic communications assets;
- Foreman of Signals (Information Systems) – trained in the installation, maintenance, repair and interoperability of military tactical/strategic Information Systems

If a soldier chooses not to follow the Supervisor route, they will remain employed 'in trade' until promoted to Warrant Officer, where they will then be classed as on the Regimental Duty (RD) roster and will oversee the daily routine, and administration of a unit's personnel and equipment.

== Museum ==
The Royal Signals Museum is based at Blandford Camp in Dorset.

== Dress and ceremonial ==
=== Tactical Recognition flash ===
The Corps wears a blue and white tactical recognition flash. This is worn horizontally on the right arm with the blue half charging forward.

=== Cap badge ===
The flag and cap badge feature Mercury (Latin: Mercurius), the winged messenger of the gods, who is referred to by members of the corps as "Jimmy". The origins of this nickname are unclear. According to one explanation, the badge is referred to as "Jimmy" because the image of Mercury was based on the late mediaeval bronze statue by the Italian sculptor Giambologna, and shortening his name over time reduced it to "Jimmy". The most widely accepted origin is a Royal Signals boxer, Jimmy Emblen, who was the British Army Champion in 1924 and represented the Royal Corps of Signals from 1921 to 1924. The first use so far recorded of "Jimmy" in this context is to be found in the (RE) Signal Service Training Camp magazine, The Wire, June 1920.

=== Lanyard ===
On No 2, No 4 and No 14 Dress, the Corps wears a dark blue lanyard on the right side signifying its early links with the Royal Engineers. The Airborne Signals Unit wears a drab green lanyard made from parachute cord.

=== Motto ===
The Corps motto is "certa cito", often translated from Latin as Swift and Sure .

=== Appointments ===
The Colonel-in-Chief is currently The Princess Royal.

== Equipment ==
The Corps deploys and operates a broad range of specialist military and commercial off-the-shelf (COTS) communications systems. The main categories are as follows:

- Satellite ground terminals
- Terrestrial trunk radio systems
- Combat net radio systems
- Computer networks
- Specialist military applications (computer programmes)

== Units ==
=== Brigades ===
There are now two signal brigades:

- 1st Signal Brigade: The Brigade Headquarters is co-located at Imjin Barracks, Innsworth, outside Gloucester, with HQ ARRC (NATO's Allied Rapid Reaction Corps).
- 7th Signals Group: The Group Headquarters is at Picton Barracks, Bulford. The group supports the 3rd Division.

The structure of the Royal Signals changed under Army 2020. The listing below shows the present location of units and their future location.

=== Regular Army ===
- 1st Signal Regiment – at Swinton Barracks .
  - 200 Signal Squadron
  - 246 (Gurkha) Signal Squadron
  - Support Squadron
- 2nd Signal Regiment – at Imphal Barracks (moving to Catterick)
  - 214 Signal Squadron
  - 219 Signal Squadron
  - Support (Jorvik) Squadron
- 3rd (United Kingdom) Division Signal Regiment – Supporting 3rd (UK) Division HQ at Picton Barracks, Bulford Camp
  - 202 Signal Squadron
  - 228 (Armoured) Signal Squadron
  - 249 (Gurkha) Signal Squadron
  - Support Squadron
- 10th Signal Regiment – at Basil Hill Barracks, Corsham
  - 81 Signal Squadron (Army Reserve)
  - 225 Signal Squadron, at Thiepval Barracks, Lisburn
  - 241 Signal Squadron, at Saint George's Barracks, Bicester Garrison
  - 251 (United Kingdom Operations) Signal Squadron, at St Omer Barracks, Aldershot Garrison
- 11th (Royal School of Signals) Signal Regiment, Blandford Camp
- 13th Signal Regiment, at Blandford Camp
  - 224 (Cyber Protection Team) Signal Squadron
  - 233 (Global Communication Networks) Signal Squadron, at Basil Hill Barracks, MoD Corsham
    - 605 Signal Troop, at Marlborough Lines, Andover
  - 254 (Specialist Group Information Services) Signal Squadron
  - 259 (Global Information Services) Signal Squadron – Joint services
  - Combat Information Systems (CIS) Trials and Development Unit (CISTDU)
- 14th Signal Regiment (Electronic Warfare), at Cawdor Barracks, Wales
  - 223 Signal Squadron (EW)
  - 226 Signal Squadron (EW)
  - 235 Signal Squadron (EW)
  - 245 Signal Squadron (EW)
- 15th Signal Regiment, at Swinton Barracks
  - 207 (Armoured) Signal Squadron
  - 243 (Gurkha) Signal Squadron
  - Support Squadron
- 16th Signal Regiment, at MOD Stafford, Stafford
  - 230 (Malaya) Signal Squadron
  - 247 (Gurkha) Squadron
  - 262 Signal Squadron
  - Support Squadron
- 18th (United Kingdom Special Forces) Signal Regiment, at Stirling Lines, Hereford
  - Special Boat Service Signal Squadron
  - 264 (Special Air Service) Signal Squadron
  - 267 (Special Reconnaissance Regiment) Signal Squadron
  - 268 (United Kingdom Special Forces) Signal Squadron
  - 63 (United Kingdom Special Forces) Signal Squadron (Army Reserve)
  - Several Light Electronic Warfare Teams (LEWTs)
- 21st Signal Regiment (Electronic Warfare), at Azimghur Barracks, Colerne
  - 215 Signal Squadron
  - 234 Signal Squadron
  - Support Squadron
- 22nd Signal Regiment, at MOD Stafford, Stafford
  - 222 Signal Squadron
  - 242 (Gurkha) Signal Squadron
  - 248 (Gurkha) Signal Squadron
  - 252 Signal Squadron, at Imjin Barracks, Gloucestershire, supporting Allied Rapid Reaction Corps
  - Support Squadron
- 30th Signal Regiment, at Gamecock Barracks, Bramcote – doubles as RHQ, Queen's Gurkha Signals (Supporting the Joint Helicopter Command and Permanent Joint Headquarters)
  - 244 Signal Squadron (Air Support)
  - 250 (Gurkha) Signal Squadron
  - 256 (JFHQ) Signal Squadron
  - 258 Signal Squadron
  - Support Squadron
- 299 Signal Squadron (Special Communications), at John Howard Barracks, Bletchley
- 255 (Special Operations) Signal Squadron, at Aldershot Garrison supporting the Army Special Operations Brigade
- 216 Parachute Signal Squadron, 16th Air Assault Brigade Headquarters and 216 (Parachute) Signal Squadron, Colchester
- 280 Signal Squadron, Blandford Camp, part of 1st NATO Signal Battalion (formerly 628 Signal Troop)
- 660 Signal Troop, at Carver Barracks – supports 29 EOD Support Group and Support Unit, reformed in 2021
- Joint Service Signal Unit, Cyprus (Ayios Nikolaos Station, Cyprus) (electronic intelligence gathering)
  - Regimental Headquarters
  - 840 Signal Squadron RAF
  - Engineering Squadron
  - Support Squadron
- Cyprus Communications Unit (British Forces Cyprus)
- Joint Communications Unit (Falkland Islands)
  - 303 Signals Unit RAF
- British Forces South Atlantic Islands Radio Communications Unit (Joint Services)
- Royal Corps of Signals Pipes and Drums
- Brunei Signal Troop, QGS – at Seria, Brunei
- Nepal Signal Troop, QGS – at Jāwalākhel, Nepal

=== Army Reserve ===
The Royal Corps of Signals reserve component was severely reduced after the 2009 Review of Reserve Forces, losing many full regiments, with their respective squadrons mostly reduced to troops.

- Central Volunteer Headquarters, Royal Corps of Signals, at Basil Hill Barracks, Corsham
  - 254 (Specialist Group Information Services) Signal Squadron
  - Royal Corps of Signals Specialist Pool
  - Royal Corps of Signals Full Time Reserve Service
- 32nd Signal Regiment
  - Regimental Headquarters, in Glasgow
    - Northern Band of the Royal Corps of Signals, in Nottingham
  - 2 (City of Dundee & Highland) Signal Squadron, in Dundee
  - 40 (Northern Irish Horse) Squadron, in Belfast
  - 51 (Scottish) Signal Squadron, in Edinburgh
  - 52 (Lowland) Support Squadron, Glasgow
- 37th Signal Regiment
  - Regimental Headquarters, in Redditch
  - 33 (Lancashire and Cheshire) Signal Squadron, in Liverpool
  - 48 (City of Birmingham) Signal Squadron, in Birmingham
  - 64 (City of Sheffield) Signal Squadron, in Sheffield
  - 54 (Queen's Own Warwickshire and Worcestershire Yeomanry) Support Squadron, in Redditch
- 39th Signal Regiment (The Skinners)
  - Regimental Headquarters, in Bristol
  - 43 (Wessex and City & County of Bristol) Signal Squadron, in Bath
  - 53 (Wales and Western) Signal Squadron, in Cardiff
  - 94 (Berkshire Yeomanry) Signal Squadron, in Windsor
- 71st (City of London) Yeomanry Signal Regiment
  - Regimental Headquarters, in Bexleyheath
  - 31 (Middlesex Yeomanry and Princess Louises's Kensington) Signal Squadron, in Uxbridge
  - 36 (Essex Yeomanry) Signal Squadron, in Colchester
  - 68 (Inns of Court & City Yeomanry) Signal Squadron, in Whipps Cross
  - 265 (Kent and County of London Yeomanry (Sharpshooters)) Support Squadron, in Bexleyheath

== Cadet Forces ==
The Royal Corps of Signals is the sponsoring Corps for several Army Cadet Force and Combined Cadet Force units, such as in Blandford Forum, home to the Royal School of Signals.

== Order of precedence ==
Preceded by Corps of Royal Engineers	Order of Precedence	Succeeded by Foot Guards

== See also ==
- CIS Corps (Ireland)
- Bermuda Volunteer Engineers
- Royal Signals and Radar Establishment
- Skynet (satellite)
- 97 Signal Squadron (Volunteers)
