= 6 Regiment Army Air Corps =

British Army Reserve regiment

- Active: 2006 – present
- Country: United Kingdom
- Branch: British Army
- Type: Aviation
- Role: Helicopter support
- Size: Regiment; 575 personnel
- Part of: Joint Aviation Command (JAC)
- Headquarters: Middle Wallop Flying Station

Insignia
- Squadron Badge heraldry: The Regimental emblem is the Army Air Corps Cap Badge with the Roman numerals VI beneath.

6 Regiment Army Air Corps is the sole Army Reserve regiment of the British Army Air Corps (AAC). The regiment consists of four Squadrons based around the south of the UK. 6 Regiment provides soldiers trained to assist Joint Aviation Command on exercise and operations both in the UK and worldwide. The regiment provides support to support and attack helicopter in roles including Aviation Groundcrew Specialists, Aviation Communication Operators and Aviation Support Officers.

== History ==
6 Regiment was formed on 2 July 2006 at Bury St Edmunds, Suffolk. It is the only reserves regiment of the Army Air Corps. The regiment was initially formed as an attack helicopter ground crew regiment, providing attack helicopter support to the regular Army Air Corps regiments at Wattisham Flying Station. The regiment has since begun training ground crew to work with the AugustaWestland AW159 Wildcat, allowing it to provide general support to the majority of the Army Air Corps.

In 2009 655 Squadron (V) The Scottish Horse joined the regiment.

The Army 2020 and Future Reserves 20 announcements in July 2013 made significant changes to the role and structure of 6 Regiment Army Air Corps. Those changes were expected to be largely in place by 1 April 2014, with extensive conversion training continuing until approximately 2017.

== Role ==
The role of 6 Regiment Army Air Corps is to provide ground support to Army aviation units operating the Boeing AH-64E Apache and the AgustaWestland Wildcat. 6 Regiment Army Air Corps is also capable of providing wider support to all aviation units within the Joint Aviation Command both on exercise and on operations. More specifically the roles of 6 Regt AAC and its personnel are:

- To have the ability to fight and operate in austere places under difficult and occasionally dangerous conditions.
- To deploy on operations as whole formed teams up to squadron level (130 soldiers) to provide:
  - Refuelling and re-arming teams.
  - The operations room teams for the co-ordination and control of aviation operations.
  - Specialist helicopter handling teams (HHT) to help ground units (e.g. infantry) operate with aviation.
- Personnel with specific skills to augment regular forces.
- Integration with Regular Army aviation units who operate Apache and Wildcat.
- Capability of working with and supporting tri-service (Royal Navy, Army and Royal Air Force) aviation assets such as Boeing Chinooks, Westland Pumas and Merlins

The Army Reserve does not recruit pilots for flying roles.

6 Regiment Army Air Corps previously supplied troops to Operation Herrick, and to Operation Telic.

== Structure ==
=== Present ===
As of November 2024, 6 Regiment Army Air Corps consists of a Regimental Headquarters (RHQ) and four squadrons:

==== Regimental Headquarters (RHQ) ====
- Located at Middle Wallop Flying Station.

==== Headquarters Squadron, 6 Regiment Army Air Corps. ====
- Provide the administrative, logistical and training support needed to facilitate 6 Regt AAC activities.

==== No. 675 (The Rifles) Squadron AAC ====
675 (The Rifles) Squadron AAC
- Active: 1 April 2014 - present
- Country: United Kingdom
- Branch: (United Kingdom) British Army
- Type: Aviation
- Role: Helicopter support
- Part of: 6 Regiment Army Air Corps
- Bases: Taunton; Yeovil

675 (The Rifles) Squadron AAC is an Army Reserve helicopter support squadron that provides groundcrews to support Wildcat helicopters. The squadron is located in Somerset at Taunton and Yeovil.

The Squadron was established on 1 April 2014 having previously been B Company, 6th Battalion, The Rifles, an Army Reserve infantry regiment, previously part of The Light Infantry.

Paired with 1 Regiment Army Air Corps (1 Regt AAC) at RNAS Yeovilton, the squadron provides ground support to the Army's AgustaWestland Wildcat helicopter Regt, 1 Reg AAC based at Yeovilton. It also has scope to support the Army's AgustaWestland Apache attack helicopter. All soldiers in the Squadron are trained in rigging and dealing with underslung loads which can be carried by a variety of aircraft including both AgustaWestland Merlin and Boeing Chinook.

The Squadron has two flights currently based at the Army Reserve Centre in Bishops Hull, Taunton also has a Flight based in the newly refurbished Army Reserve Centre in Yeovil in the county of Somerset. It is paired with 1 Regt AAC at RNAS Yeovilton.

==== No. 677 (Suffolk and Norfolk Yeomanry) Squadron AAC ====
- Formed on 2 July 2006
- The unit was created after 202 (The Suffolk and Norfolk Yeomanry) Battery, Royal Artillery changed role
- Previously recruited from Swaffham until January 2014
- Located in East Anglia (Bury St Edmunds, Norwich and Wattisham Flying Station)
- Paired with 3 Regiment AAC in Wattisham.
- Provide ground support to Boeing AH-64E Apaches.
- Where capacity allows: assist 675 Sqn with the provision of helicopter handling teams.

==== No. 679 (The Duke of Connaught's) Squadron AAC ====
- Located in Hampshire (Portsmouth and Middle Wallop Flying Station).
- Created by the renaming of No. 655 Squadron AAC at Middle Wallop Flying Station and then the transfer of D company of 3 PWRR.
- Paired with the Army Aviation Centre (AACen) at Middle Wallop Flying Station .
- Provide ground support to Apache.
- Provide ground support to AACen training.
- Where capacity allows: assist 675 Sqn with the provision of helicopter handling teams.

=== Former ===
==== No. 678 (The Rifles) Squadron AAC ====
- Disbanded from the regiment in November 2021, following the defence review. Personnel were used to form an RLC unit.
- Was located in Buckinghamshire and Bedfordshire (Milton Keynes and Luton)
- Created from the transfer of E company of 7 Rifles, 201 Battery of 100 Regiment Royal Artillery and 1 Sqn 38 Signals Regiment (RBY) Bletchley.
- Formerly paired with 4 Regiment AAC in Wattisham.
- Provided ground support to Apache.
- Assisted 675 Sqn with the provision of helicopter handling teams.

== See also ==
- List of Army Air Corps aircraft units
