= Gamecock Barracks =

Military installation in Warwickshire, England

- Near Nuneaton, Warwickshire in England
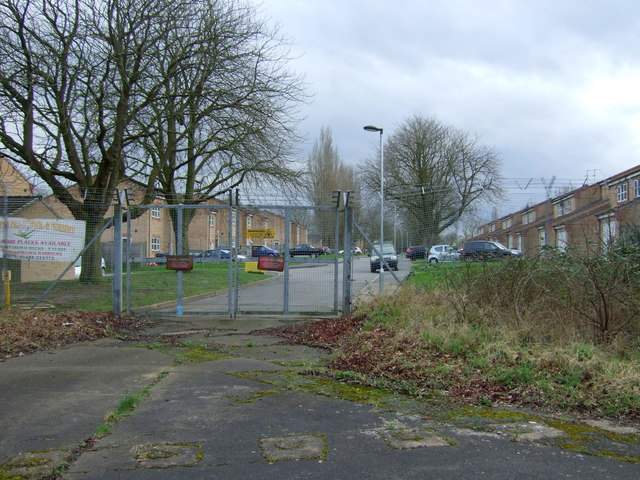
- An entrance to Gamecock Barracks

Site information
- Type: Army barracks
- Owner: Ministry of Defence
- Operator: British Army
- Controlled by: Royal Corps of Signals
- Condition: Operational

Location
- Location within Warwickshire
- Coordinates: 52°29′23″N 01°23′57″W
- Area: 96 hectares (240 acres)

Site history
- Built: 1959
- In use: 1959 – present

Garrison information
- Garrison: 30 Signal Regiment

Gamecock Barracks is a British Army installation located at Bramcote, 3.5 miles (5.6 km) south-east of Nuneaton in Warwickshire.

== History ==
The barracks was established on the site of the former RAF Bramcote airbase in 1959. It was named after HMS Gamecock, the naval ship name given to the airbase by the Royal Navy before the British Army took over.

The barracks were home to the Junior Leaders' Regiment Royal Artillery between the 1960s and the 1990s, which was a training establishment for the future non-commissioned officers of the Royal Artillery. It was one of many different types of Junior establishments for soldiers serving from the age of 15 to 17 years (until the school leaving age was raised to 16). After completing their military and trade training, which initially took two years, but was latterly reduced to 12 months, they would muster to their designated Field Army artillery regiments.

In 1993, 30 Signal Regiment moved to the barracks. The regiment's personnel are held at very high notice to move, to be utilised worldwide in a matter of days, earning the regiment the nickname 'The Globetrotters'. The regiment's primary role is to support the Standing Joint Force Headquarters (SJFHQ).

== Current units ==
Since 1993, the barracks has been occupied by 30 Signal Regiment. The Regimental Headquarters, Queen's Gurkha Signals is also based here. Commander QG SIGNALS is also the Commanding Officer of 30 Signal Regiment.

The former Nottingham Explosives Ordnance Disposal (EOD) Troop relocated to Gamecock from Chetwynd Barracks in July 2025. The unit, renamed Nuneaton EOD Troop to reflect its new home, is part of 721 EOD Squadron, 11 EOD and Search Regiment, Royal Logistic Corps. A purpose built compound was constructed at the barracks for the troop, including offices, garages, secure stores and a training area.

== Future ==
In November 2016, following a review of the defence infrastructure, it was announced that Gamecock Barracks would additionally be home to the following units:

- 30 Signal Regiment - (remaining in location)
- Works Groups of the Royal Engineers - relocating from Chetwynd Barracks, Chilwell
- Medical Training Facility

Together with Whittington Barracks, this would form a West Midlands-based Defence Medical Services centre of excellence.

== See also ==
- List of British Army installations
