= Jonathan Pentreath =

Royal Navy Rear Admiral (born 1966)

Rear Admiral Jonathan Pentreath CB OBE
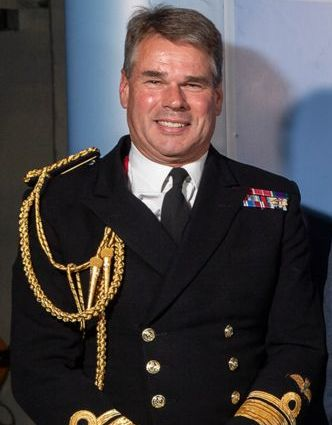
- Rear Admiral Pentreath in 2019
- Born: 2 March 1966 (age 60)
- Military career
- Allegiance: United Kingdom
- Branch: Royal Navy
- Service years: 1984–2020
- Rank: Rear Admiral
- Commands: Joint Helicopter Command (2017–20); Royal Naval Air Station Yeovilton (2015–17); Commando Helicopter Force (2009–11); Commander Air, HMS Ocean (2007–08); 845 Naval Air Squadron (2001–03)
- Conflicts: War in Afghanistan; Iraq War: Battle of Al Faw
- Awards: Companion of the Order of the Bath; Officer of the Order of the British Empire; Queen's Commendation for Valuable Service

Rear Admiral Jonathan Patrick Pentreath, CB, OBE (born 2 March 1966) is a retired senior officer of the Royal Navy. He commanded 845 Naval Air Squadron from 2001 to 2003, including during the Battle of Al Faw in the Iraq War, and later commanded Commando Helicopter Force (2009–11) and Royal Naval Air Station, Yeovilton (2015–17). He was Commander Joint Helicopter Command from April 2017 until March 2020 when he retired from the Royal Navy.

== Early life and education ==
Pentreath was born on 2 March 1966 in Plymstock, Devon, England. His father was Captain David Pentreath, a decorated Royal Navy officer. He was educated at Sandroyd School, Haileybury and Imperial Service College, a public school in Hertfordshire, and City, University of London.

== Naval career ==
Pentreath joined the Royal Navy in 1984. He became Commanding Officer 845 Naval Air Squadron in 2001 and saw action at the Battle of Al Faw in March 2003 during the Iraq War, for which he was awarded a Queen's Commendation for Valuable Service. He went on to be Commander Air of the amphibious assault ship HMS Ocean in 2006, then Commanding Officer Commando Helicopter Force in 2008 with a promotion to captain on 9 September 2008. He was appointed Capability Director at Joint Helicopter Command in July 2012, and promoted to commodore on 16 July 2012. After that he became Commanding Officer Royal Naval Air Station Yeovilton in September 2015, and Commander Joint Helicopter Command in April 2017. He handed over command of Joint Helicopter Command in March 2020 and retired from the Royal Navy on 1 August 2020.

Pentreath was appointed Officer of the Order of the British Empire (OBE) in the 2012 New Year Honours and Companion of the Order of the Bath (CB) in the 2019 Birthday Honours.

Military offices
| Preceded by Richard Felton | Commander, Joint Helicopter Command; 2017–2020 | Succeeded by Nigel Colman |
