= Wolvey =

Village in Warwickshire, England

Coordinates: 52.486614°N 1.369299°W

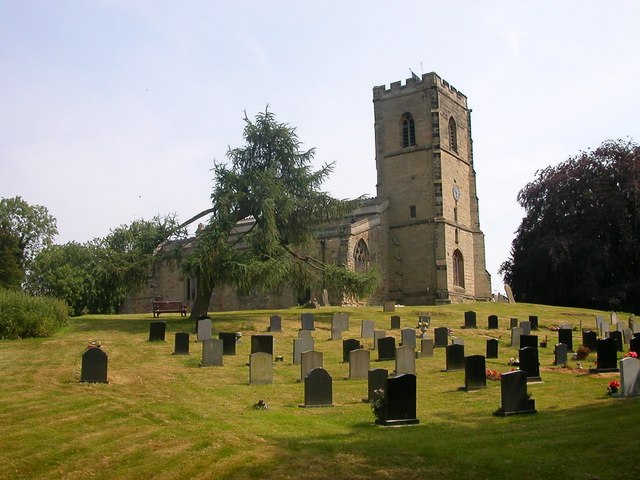
- St John the Baptist Parish Church

- Location within Warwickshire
- Population: 2,121 (2021)
- OS grid reference: SP4287
- Civil parish: Wolvey
- District: Rugby
- Shire county: Warwickshire
- Region: West Midlands
- Country: England
- Sovereign state: United Kingdom
- Post town: HINCKLEY
- Postcode district: LE10
- Dialling code: 01455
- Police: Warwickshire
- Fire: Warwickshire
- Ambulance: West Midlands
- UK Parliament: Rugby

Wolvey is a village and parish in Warwickshire, England. According to the 2011 census it had a population of 1,942, which increased to 2,121 at the 2021 census.

The village is situated close to the Warwickshire-Leicestershire border in an outlying part of the borough of Rugby. The village is, however, more than 11 miles (18 km) northwest of the town of Rugby and closer to Hinckley (5 miles to the north), Nuneaton (6 miles to the northwest) and Coventry (9 miles southwest). The source of the River Anker is near the highest point in the parish at 130 metres (427 ft) above sea-level. Originally on the main route between Leicester and Coventry, is now served by the B4065 and B4109 roads. The hamlet of Bramcote forms a western part of the parish, This was the site of a Second World War airfield, RAF Bramcote, subsequently used by the Royal Naval Air Service and renamed HMS Gamecock. Since 1959 it has been used by the army and is known as the Gamecock Barracks.

Discoveries of Neolithic flint tools and Bronze Age burial mounds suggest early occupation of the parish while a major Roman road, Watling Street, forms part of the parish boundary. The village certainly existed in Saxon times and the Domesday Survey, compiled in 1086, records 22 households with three further households at Bramcote. By the 12th century there was an additional township, which included a chapel, at the now deserted site of Little Copston (Copston Parva). At this time Wolvey was an important population centre for the area with a weekly market and an annual fair.

The village still retains some older buildings including the church of St John the Baptist with its Norman doorway and monumental tombs of Thomas de Wolvey (died 1311) and his wife Alice; also that of Thomas Astley and his wife, Catherine (died 1603). The South Aisle of the church was rebuilt by Thomas de Wolvey's daughter as a memorial chantry to her husband Sir Giles de Astley who died following the Battle of Bannockburn in 1314. The church building has undergone considerable repair and alteration over the years. The chancel was rebuilt in the gothic style by Lord Overstone of Wolvey Grange in the mid-nineteenth century and the present porch to the south door added in 1909. The Millennium Building to the south of the church was built in 2000 to provide important support facilities.

The early village would have clustered around the market place (now The Square) but there is little evidence of it in today's buildings.. A staircase dated 1677 in Wolvey Hall reflects the rebuilding of the original house but this was remodelled in 1889. Other late seventeenth century survivals, although modified, include Hollytree Cottage in Wolds Lane and probably 'The Blue Pig' public house with the village pump which will have served as a coaching inn for the Coventry – Leicester traffic in earlier times. The ‘Old Thatched Cottage’ on the edge of The Square dates to the later eighteenth century as does the Baptist Chapel, built in 1789.

Essentially a farming community for most of its history, industrialization affected the village in the nineteenth century when knitting and weaving became important trades for a time. There is no evidence to support the popular view that it was a milling centre with 27 windmills. The well-known engraving of four windmills in Wolvey, published in 1854 by Thomas Dugdale, has been shown to be a forgery and was based on an earlier print of windmills on Montmartre, Paris. While rural industry continues, modern housing provides for a commuting population benefiting from the village's proximity to major motorway and rail networks and urban centres.

The name Wolvey most probably came from the Anglo-Saxon wulf-hæg or wulf-heg e = "wolf hedge" = "enclosure with a hedge to keep wolves out".

== Wolvey Hall ==
Wolvey Hall is a Grade II listed 17th-century house remodelled in 1889 which stands in Hall Road, Wolvey. It is constructed of brick in two storeys with attics and a 6-bay frontage. A Roman Catholic chapel is attached and in the grounds is the ruined Jacobs Well, bearing a date of 1707.

The current house was rebuilt in 1889 using material from an earlier house built in 1677 and also includes fragments from an even earlier building. In the mid-1700s the house was owned by the Arnold family, who could trace family ownership of the manor of Wolvey back to Sir Thomas de Wolvey (died 1315). It has been owned by the Coape-Arnolds since Georgeana, daughter of George Henry Arnold, married James Coape of Goldhanger, Essex in 1840. In 1891 Henry Fraser James Coape-Arnold, a catholic convert, built the chapel at the Hall which served the Catholic residents of the area until the early 1920s.

The hall is currently in the possession of the Freeman family, with children Arabella and Theo by descent from Mary Freeman née Burbidge.

== Governance ==
Wolvey is governed by a Parish Council made up of 7 Councillors serving on 4-year term, with a chairman and vice chairman selected by the council in May of each year for a 12 month term (currently Adrian Warwick). Wolvey is represented by Becky Maoudis in the Rugby Borough Council as part of the Woley and Shilton Ward, and is a represented in the Warwickshire County Council as part of the Fosse Division by the Wolvey Parish Council Chairman, Adrian Warwick.
