= No. 679 (The Duke of Connaught's) Squadron AAC =

No. 679 (The Duke of Connaught's) Squadron
- Active: 1 April 2014 - present
- Country: United Kingdom
- Branch: (United Kingdom) British Army
- Role: Helicopter Support Unit
- Size: Squadron
- Part of: 6 Regiment Army Air Corps
- Garrison/HQ: Hampshire

No. 679 (The Duke of Connaught's) Squadron AAC is a British Army Reserve helicopter support squadron and is part of the 6 Regiment Army Air Corps. The squadron provides groundcrews to support Boeing AH-64E Apache helicopters.

== History ==
=== 655 Squadron ===
655 Squadron traces its lineage to No. 655 Squadron RAF formed on 30 November 1942 at Old Sarum Airfield, Wiltshire. The squadron's role was to provide targeting and direction information to the artillery on the ground. A large number of the pilots were Army gunnery officers from the 80th (The Scottish Horse) Medium Regiment, Royal Artillery. On 12 August 1943, the squadron deployed in support of the 8th Army to North Africa and subsequently moved to Italy, where it remained supporting various formations until its disbandment on 31 August 1945. 'A' Flight had served in the Battle of Anzio.

655 Light Aircraft Squadron was formed in April 1962 at Tofrek Barracks in Germany operating the Sud Aviation Alouette II helicopter. In April 1964, the squadron moved to Hammersmith Barracks at Herford and was renamed 655 Aviation Squadron. The squadron was employed by 4 Division Aviation Headquarters from 1964 to 1969.

In 1971, the squadron was renamed as 655 (The Scottish Horse) Aviation Squadron in recognition of its historical linkage to The Scottish Horse. On 1 January 1973, the squadron was renamed as 655 (The Scottish Horse) Squadron.

The squadron completed four tours in Northern Ireland between 1973 and 1979. In 1978, 666 Squadron AAC had been re-designated as 655 (The Scottish Horse) Squadron based at Topcliffe, Yorkshire.

In 1979, the squadron moved to Omagh in Northern Ireland as part of the Northern Ireland Regiment, where it carried out anti-terrorist duties in support of 3 Brigade. The squadron operated the Westland Gazelle AH1 and Westland Scout AH1 helicopter.

In the summer of 1982, the squadron moved to Shackleton Barracks, County Londonderry. The Scout was replaced by the Lynx AH Mk1 helicopter which was faster and had greater endurance.

In the summer of 1991, the squadron moved to RAF Aldergrove to collocate with the rest of the Northern Ireland Regiment. The squadron became equipped with the Lynx AH7 which had improved avionics, reduced noise, better hover capability and more advanced composite rotor blades. The Northern Ireland Regiment was renamed as 5 Regiment AAC in 1993.

In March 2007, the squadron was disbanded as Operation Banner was drawing to a close and due to a need to reduce the Lynx fleet set to be retired in 2012.

On 1 April 2009, the squadron was reformed as a Territorial Army unit 655 (The Scottish Horse) Squadron (Volunteers) as part of 6 Regiment Army Air Corps (Volunteers) based at the Army Aviation Centre, AAC Middle Wallop. The squadron's role was to provide groundcrew individual reinforcements to army aviation units for exercises and operational deployment.

=== D Company, 3 PWRR ===
D Company of 3rd Battalion, Princess of Wales's Royal Regiment (3 PWRR) was formed in 2005. D Company was an infantry rifle company with a machine gun platoon based at Portsmouth.

D Company had been reassigned in 2005 from C (Duke of Connaught's) Company of the Royal Rifle Volunteers. C (Duke of Connaught's) Company had been reassigned in 1999 from C (DCO) Company of 6th/7th Battalion, The Princess of Wales's Regiment. C (DCO) Company had been reassigned in 1992 from A (DCO) Company of 2nd Battalion, Wessex Regiment. A (DCO) Company had been reassigned in 1971 from B Company of Hampshire & Isle of Wight Territorials.

D Company had historical linkage to the 3rd Hampshire Volunteer Battalion formed in 1860 and which in 1908 became the 6th (Duke of Connaught's Own) Battalion, The Hampshire Regiment.

== Present day ==
On 1 April 2014, 679 (The Duke of Connaught's) Squadron was formed following the re-designation of 655 (The Scottish Horse) Squadron and the transfer of a re-roled D Company, 3 PWRR to the squadron as part of the Future Reserves 2020 re-organisation of the Army Reserves.

The squadron traces its lineage to No. 679 Squadron RAF formed on 1 December 1943 at RAF Ipswich. The squadron operated the Miles Martinet, Hawker Hurricane, Fairey Barracuda and Vultee A-31 Vengeance aircraft types for anti-aircraft duties based at East Anglia. 679 Squadron RAF disbanded on 26 June 1945.

The squadron is a sub-unit of 6 Regiment AAC and consists of Squadron Headquarters (SHQ) and A Flight based at Duke of Connaught's Barracks in Portsmouth and B Flight based at the Army Aviation Centre.

The squadron is paired with the Army Aviation Centre where it provides ground support to the Apache. The squadron is trained in the loading of missiles, rockets, ammunition and the refuelling of the aircraft from a Forward Arming and Refuelling Point (FARP).

== See also ==
- List of Army Air Corps aircraft units
