= Queen's Gurkha Signals =

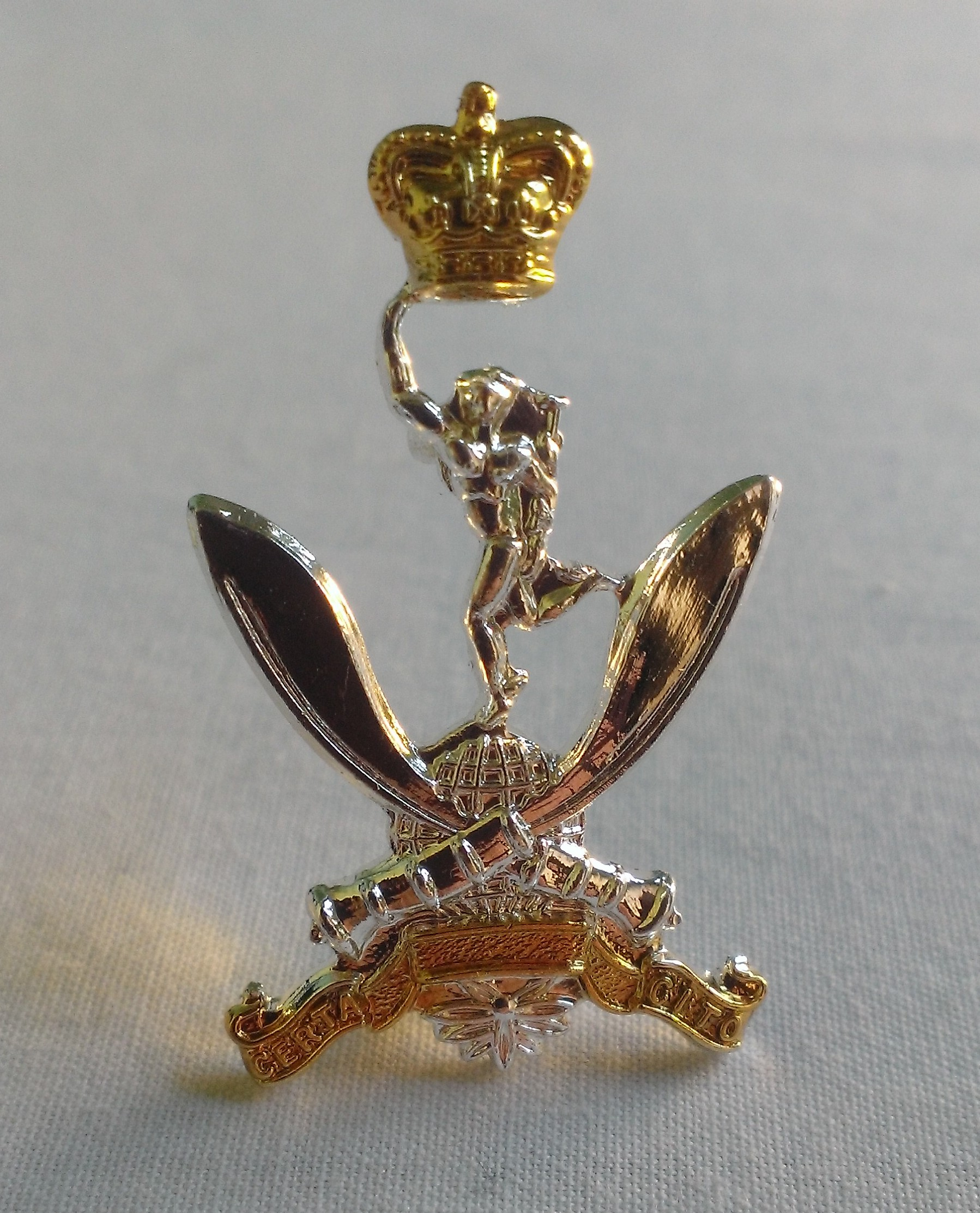
- Cap badge of the Queens Gurkha Signals
- Active: 1949 – Present
- Country: United Kingdom
- Branch: British Army
- Role: Combat support
- Size: 7 Squadrons
- Garrison/HQ: Malaya; Hong Kong; RHQ – Gamecock Barracks; 243 and 246 Squadron – Swinton Barracks; 242, 247 and 248 Squadron – MOD Stafford; 249 Squadron – Bulford Camp; 250 Squadron – Gamecock Barracks
- Mottos: Certa Cito: Swift and Sure
- March: Scotland the Brave
- Anniversaries: Regimental Birthday; 23 September

Commanders
- Colonel-in-Chief: Anne, Princess Royal
- Colonel of the Regiment: Brigadier Mike Fayers

Insignia
- Shoulder Flash

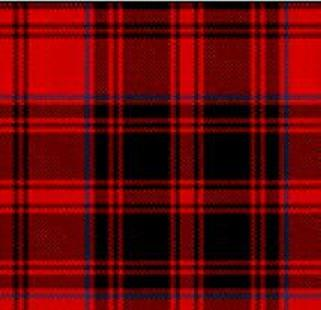
- Tartan (Grant)
- Abbreviation: QG SIGNALS

The Queen's Gurkha Signals (QG SIGNALS) is a regular unit of Royal Corps of Signals, one of the combat support arms of British Army. Together with the Queen's Gurkha Engineers, the Queen's Own Gurkha Logistic Regiment, the Royal Gurkha Rifles, and a number of smaller support units, they form part of the Brigade of Gurkhas. QGS was formed during The Malayan Emergency to support the 17th Gurkha Division.

== History ==
The history of Queen's Gurkha Signals dates back to 1911 when Gurkha Signallers were employed in the three Indian Corps of Sappers and Miners (Bombay, Bengal, and Madras). It was not until the First World War the whole companies of Gurkha signallers existed within these three Corps. Eventually at the end of 1928 these corps were phased out of service due to an insufficient work force.

The second Gurkha Signals unit was created during The Malayan Emergency. The unit was raised to support the Gurkha Infantry involved in battle against communist anti-colonial guerilla organization, the Malayan National Liberation Army. This unit was fully composed of Gurkhas unlike the previous incarnation. On 18 December 1959, the newly formed unit was christened 48th Gurkha Brigade Signal Squadron with its commander Major L H Gregory MBE.

== Titles of the regiment and its predecessor ==
As a part of Queen's Silver Jubilee celebrations 1977, the Regiment regained its Royal title, along with the Gurkha Engineers, becoming Queen's Gurkha Signals. The Royal title and Royal crown were officially adapted on 20 April 1977. Titles of the regiment and its predecessor are as follows:

- Gurkha Signals (1948–1949)
- Gurkha Royal Signals (1949–1954)
- Gurkha Signals (1954–1977)
- Queen's Gurkha Signals (since 1977)

== Cap badge and colours ==
=== Cap badge ===
During its formation year all the men were titled Gurkha Royal Signals and wore the badge of the Royal Corps of Signals, 'Jimmy'. On 23 September 1954, Maj Gen LECM Perowne CBE presented the unit with their own cap badge and since that day the regiment celebrates its birthday on 23 September.

By your badge men shall know you. By your loyalty, by your behaviour and by your technical skill, they will judge you as men and measure your efficiency as soldiers

On 21 April 1956 an honour was bestowed upon the Regiment when Her Royal Highness the Princess Royal presented her pipe banner to the Pipes and Drums. Her Royal Highness the Princess Royal has continued to serve as the Colonel-in-Chief of QGS as she is of Royal Corps of Signals.

=== Emblem ===
Two Khukuris point upwards, the hands crossed in saltire, the cutting edges of the blades inwards, between the blades the figure of Mercury on a globe, the latter supported above by a scroll bearing the motto 'Certa Cito' and below by nine laurel leaves, the whole surmounted by Saint Edward's Crown. The regiment were also given permission to adopt the Red Grant tartan and thus began affiliation with the Scottish Regiment.

== Structure ==
=== Active ===
The unit has seven squadrons:

- 242 Squadron – MOD Stafford
- 243 Squadron – Swinton Barracks, Perham Down
- 246 Squadron – Swinton Barracks, Perham Down
- 247 Squadron – MOD Stafford
- 248 Squadron – MOD Stafford
- 249 Squadron – Bulford Camp, Salisbury Plain
- 250 Squadron – Gamecock Barracks, Bramcote

== See also ==
- Units of the Royal Corps of Signals

== Bibliography ==
- Warner, Philip (1989). The Vital Link: The Story of Royal Signals 1945-1985. Pen & Sword. ISBN 978-0850528824.
