= Carl Dixon (RAF officer) =

Commander of Joint Helicopter Command from 2011 to 2014

Air Vice-Marshal Carl Dixon CB OBE
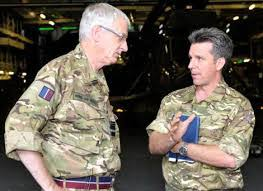
- Air Vice-Marshal Dixon (left) in 2011
- Died: February 2025
- Military career
- Allegiance: United Kingdom
- Branch: Royal Air Force
- Service years: 1979–2014
- Rank: Air Vice-Marshal
- Commands: Joint Helicopter Command; RAF Benson; No. 27 Squadron
- Conflicts: Bosnian War; Kosovo War; Sierra Leone Civil War; Iraq War
- Awards: Companion of the Order of the Bath; Officer of the Order of the British Empire

Air Vice-Marshal Carl William Dixon, CB, OBE (died February 2025) was a senior commander of the Royal Air Force who served as Commander of Joint Helicopter Command from 2011 to 2014.

== RAF career ==
Dixon was commissioned into the Royal Air Force (RAF) in 1979. As a junior officer he flew Chinook helicopters from RAF Germany. After an operational tour with the United Nations in Rwanda during the Rwandan genocide in 1994, he joined the Policy Staff at the Ministry of Defence. He became Commander of the Joint Support Helicopter Force in Bosnia and Herzegovina in 1997 and Officer Commanding No. 27 Squadron later that year. He led helicopter operations over Kosovo in 1999, was deployed to Sierra Leone in 2000 and then focussed on a scheme to develop joint helicopter capabilities with the Fleet Air Arm and Army Air Corps later that year.

Dixon joined the Air Resources & Plans Directorate at the Ministry of Defence in 2003 and then became Station Commander at RAF Benson from where he was deployed to Iraq as Commander of the UK Joint Helicopter Force. He became Director Equipment Capability (Air & Littoral Manoeuvre) in 2005, Director (Information Superiority) in 2008 and Commander of Joint Helicopter Command in 2011.

Dixon was appointed a Companion of the Order of the Bath in the 2010 Birthday Honours.

Dixon died in February 2025.

Military offices
Preceded by Tony Johnstone-Burt	Commander Joint Helicopter Command; 2011–2014	Succeeded by Richard Felton
