= Nigel Colman (RAF officer) =

British air force officer (born 1971)

Air Vice-Marshal Nigel Colman CB OBE
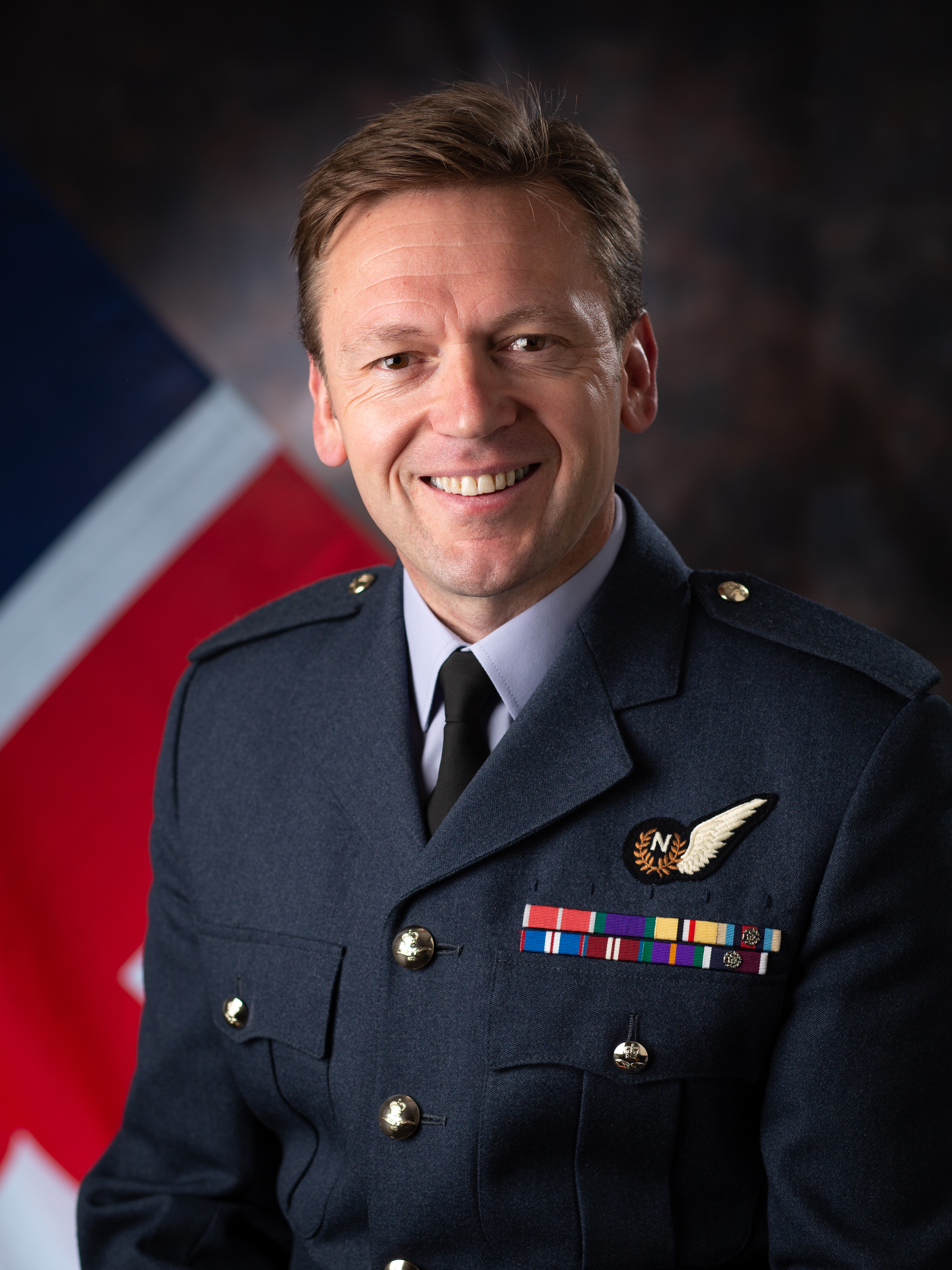
- Military career
- Allegiance: United Kingdom
- Branch: Royal Air Force
- Service years: 1990–2023
- Rank: Air Vice-Marshal
- Commands: Joint Helicopter Command; RAF Benson; No. 78 Squadron
- Conflicts: Northern Ireland; Bosnia; Iraq War; War in Afghanistan
- Awards: Companion of the Order of the Bath; Officer of the Order of the British Empire

Air Vice-Marshal Nigel James Colman CB OBE (born 18 January 1971) is a retired officer of the Royal Air Force who last served as Commander of Joint Helicopter Command from 2020 to 2023.

== RAF career ==
Colman was commissioned into the Royal Air Force (RAF) on 20 June 1991. As officer commanding No. 78 Squadron he saw action in Iraq and then in Afghanistan. He became station commander at RAF Benson as well as Puma and Merlin force commander in October 2012. He saw the Merlins leave the force in October 2014.

Colman went on to be Deputy Director of Military Support in July 2015, followed by a move to become the Head of Military Strategic Effects at the Ministry of Defence in April 2018 and Commander of Joint Helicopter Command in March 2020. He stepped down from this position in March 2023, and retired from the RAF at his own request in August 2023.

Colman was appointed Officer of the Order of the British Empire (OBE) in the 2011 New Year Honours, and Companion of the Order of the Bath (CB) in the 2024 New Year Honours.

Military offices
Preceded by Jonathan Pentreath	Commander Joint Helicopter Command; 2020–2023	Succeeded by Alastair Smith
