= Joint Aviation Command =

Tri-service command of the British Armed Forces

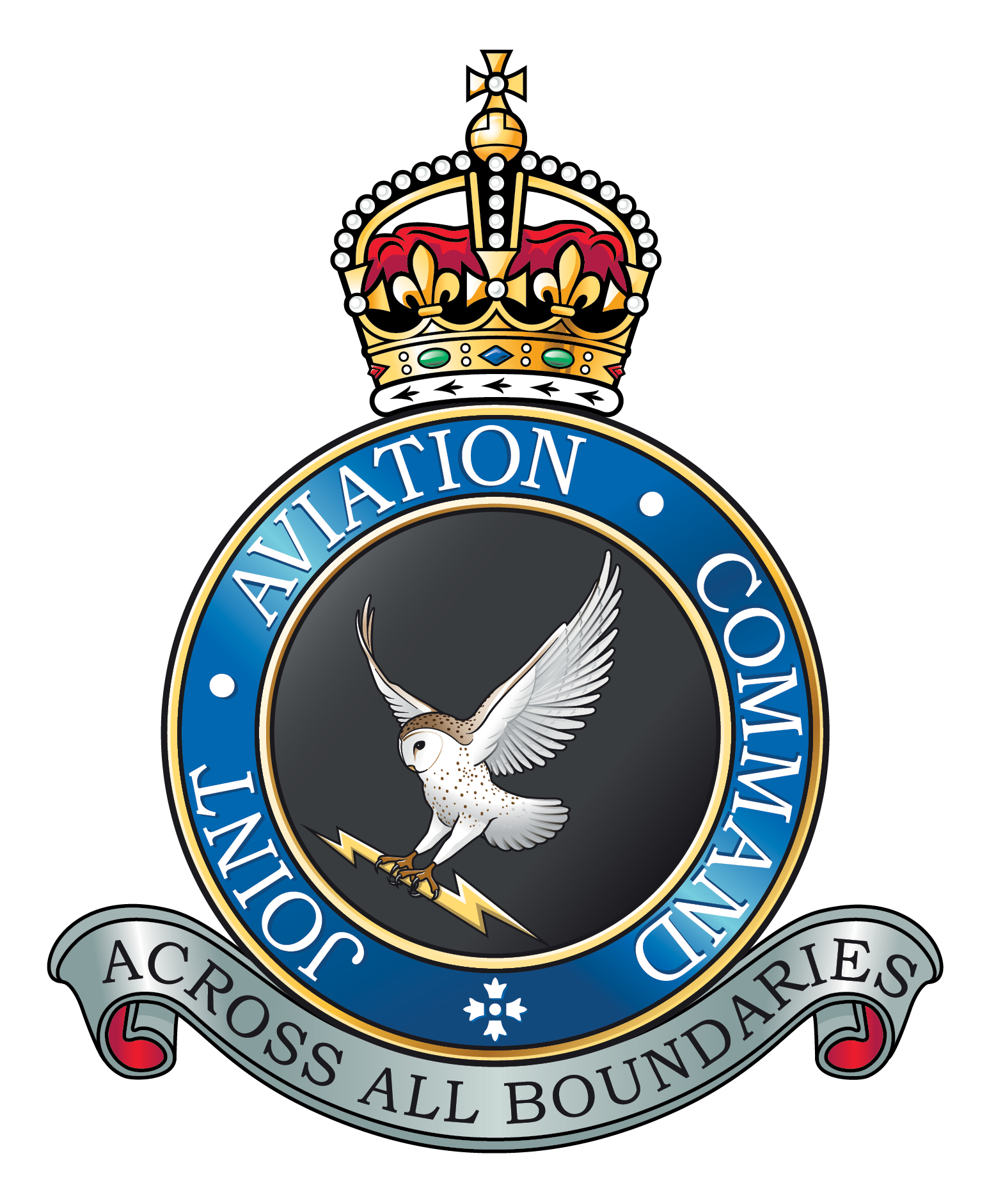
- Joint Aviation Command badge
- Active: 5 October 1999 – present
- Country: United Kingdom
- Branch: British Army; Royal Navy; Royal Air Force
- Type: Tri-service command
- Role: Battlefield helicopter operations Army UAV operations
- Size: 15,000 personnel; 239 aircraft
- Part of: Army Headquarters
- Headquarters: Marlborough Lines, Andover
- Motto: Across all boundaries
- Aircraft: Apache AH64-E; Chinook HC5/6/6A; Merlin HC4/4A; Watchkeeper WK450; Wildcat AH1; Miniature Unmanned Aerial Systems

Commanders
- Current commander: Air Vice-Marshal Lee Turner
- Inaugural commander: Air-Vice Marshal David Niven

The Joint Aviation Command (JAC), previously known as Joint Helicopter Command (JHC), is a tri-service organisation uniting battlefield military helicopters of all three services of the British Armed Forces and unmanned aerial vehicles of the British Army for command and coordination purposes.

The majority of the United Kingdom's military helicopters come under JAC, although exceptions include the Royal Navy's anti-surface warfare, anti-submarine warfare and airborne early warning helicopters and the No. 1 Flying Training School.

== History ==
=== Background ===
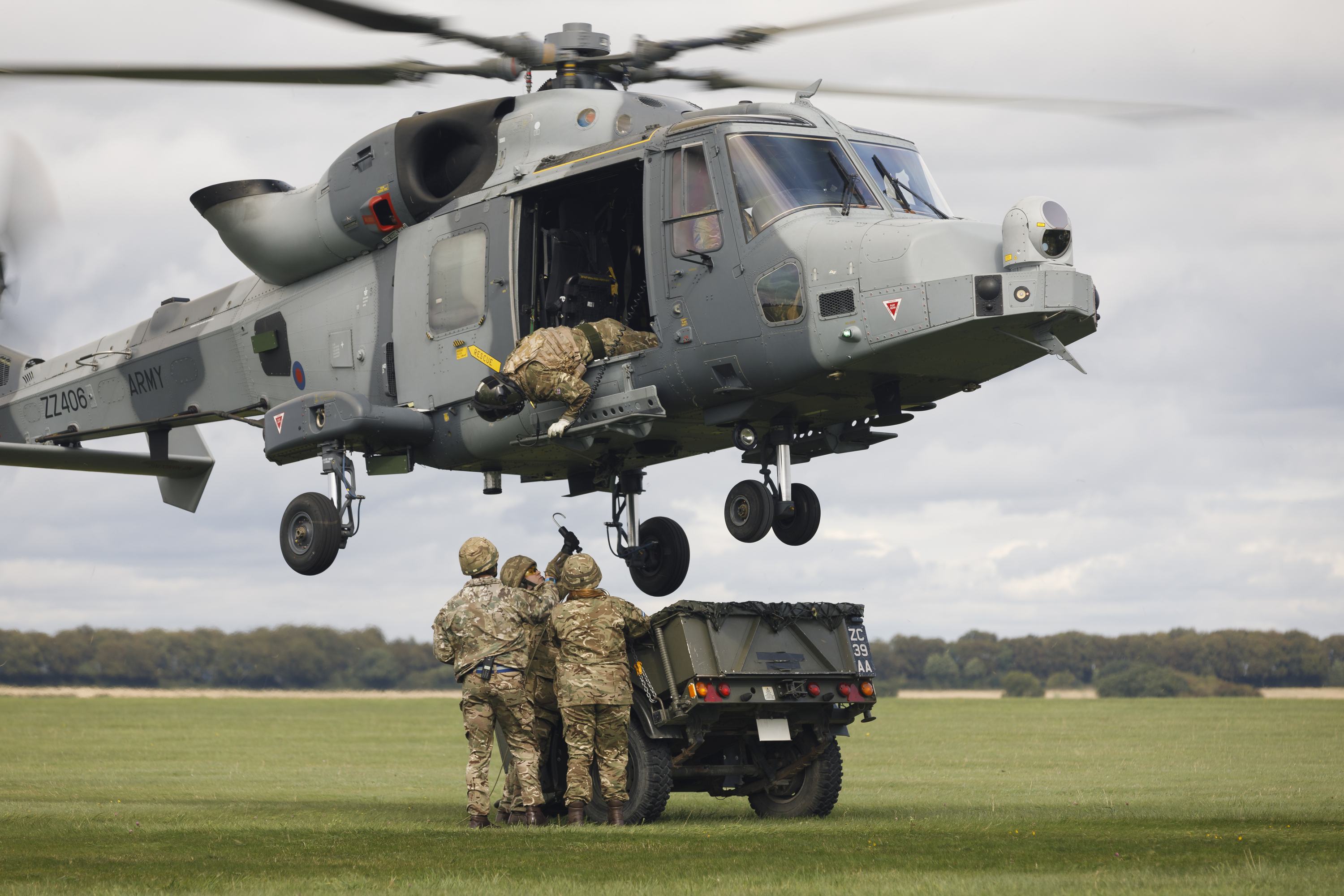
An Army Air Corps Wildcat AH1 conducts under slung load training with 6 Regiment personnel

Over the years, the grouping of all battlefield support helicopters operated by the Fleet Air Arm (FAA), Army Air Corps (AAC) and Royal Air Force (RAF) into one of the services had been discussed, however the Ministry of Defence (MOD) believed that any advantages would be outweighed by the damaging impact such a re-organisation would have on ethos, morale and operational effectiveness.

The Strategic Defence Review (SDR), published by the MOD in July 1998, announced that a Joint Helicopter Command (JHC) would be formed, which would deliver training, standards, doctrinal development and support for operations in order to maximise the availability of battlefield helicopters and reinforce their growing importance in military operations. JHC would be a tri-Service organisation, with personnel remaining part of their parent service. The formation of JHC was considered by the MOD as one of the most important initiatives to result from the SDR. The command was expected to draw on the equipment, personnel and expertise of the single services and be charged with providing the Joint Force Commander tailored packages of battlefield helicopters (from one or more service), support equipment and personnel, to meet operational requirements. The MOD's intention was to provide a single focus for the transfer of best practice from service to service and for removing, over time, differences in extant operating procedures.

A Joint Helicopter Command Study Team was established to determine how JHC should operate. Four options for the location of JHC Headquarters were also examined, with RNAS Yeovilton in Somerset, AAC Netheravon in Wiltshire, HQ Land Command at Erskine Barracks in Wiltshire and RAF Benson in Oxfordshire, being considered for the role.

=== Establishment ===
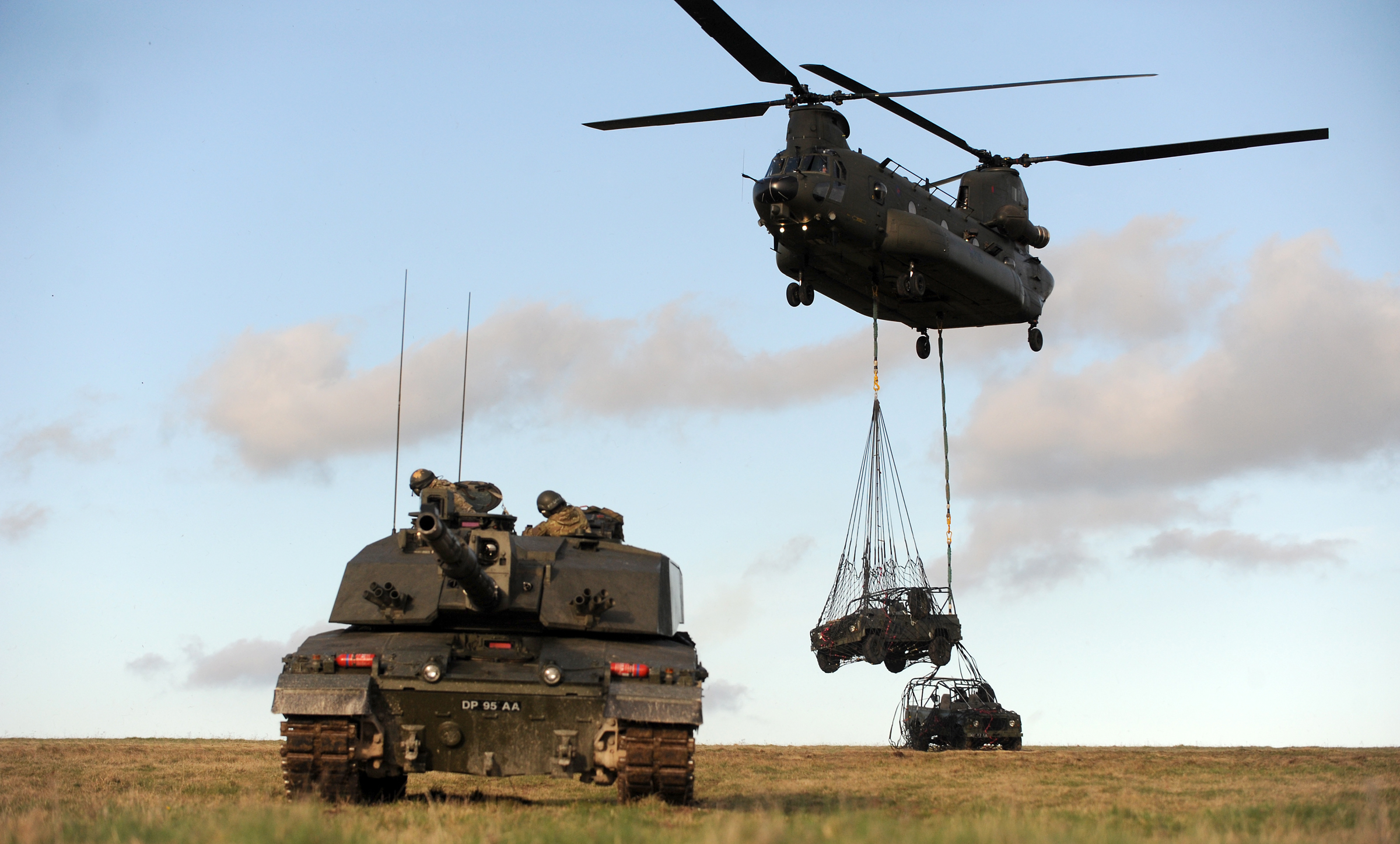
An RAF Chinook delivers Wolf Scout Land Rovers on the Salisbury Plain Training Area

Joint Helicopter Command was formed on 5 October 1999, bringing together the FAA's commando helicopters, the Army's attack and light utility helicopters, and the RAF's support helicopters. The FAA's anti-surface warfare, anti-submarine warfare and airborne early warning helicopters, and FAA and RAF search and rescue helicopters were not included in JHC and remained under the control of the respective services. JHC Headquarters was established alongside HQ Land Command at Erskine Barracks, with Air-Vice Marshal David Niven being the inaugural commander.

In 2007, JHC had over 15,000 personnel under its command, some 8,000 of who were part of 16 Air Assault Brigade This included over 900 volunteer reserves from the Territorial Army and Royal Auxiliary Air Force, and 380 MOD civilians.

Joint Helicopter Command's largest operation to date has been Operation Telic, the invasion of Iraq. Following the invasion, Joint Helicopter Command maintained units in Iraq, in support of British and coalition forces deployed there. Another detachment was also maintained in Afghanistan, as part of Operation Herrick.

In 2024, Joint Helicopter Command evolved into Joint Aviation Command with the introduction of unmanned aerial vehicle operations into the command.

=== Joint Helicopter Force (Northern Ireland) ===
The JHC operation in Northern Ireland in support of the Police Service of Northern Ireland and military units as part of Operation Banner and later Operation Helvetic was named the Joint Helicopter Force Northern Ireland (JHF(NI)). JHF(NI) consisted of the following units based at Joint Helicopter Command Flying Station Aldergrove:

- 5 Regiment
  - No. 655 Squadron – Westland Lynx AH1
  - No. 665 Squadron – Gazelle AH1
  - Reconnaissance, Intelligence and Geographic Centre (Northern Ireland)
- No. 230 Squadron – Westland Puma HC1

=== Joint Helicopter Force (Iraq) ===
The JHC operation in Iraq as part of Operation Telic was named Joint Helicopter Force Iraq (JHF(I)).

The following aircraft types served with JHF(I):

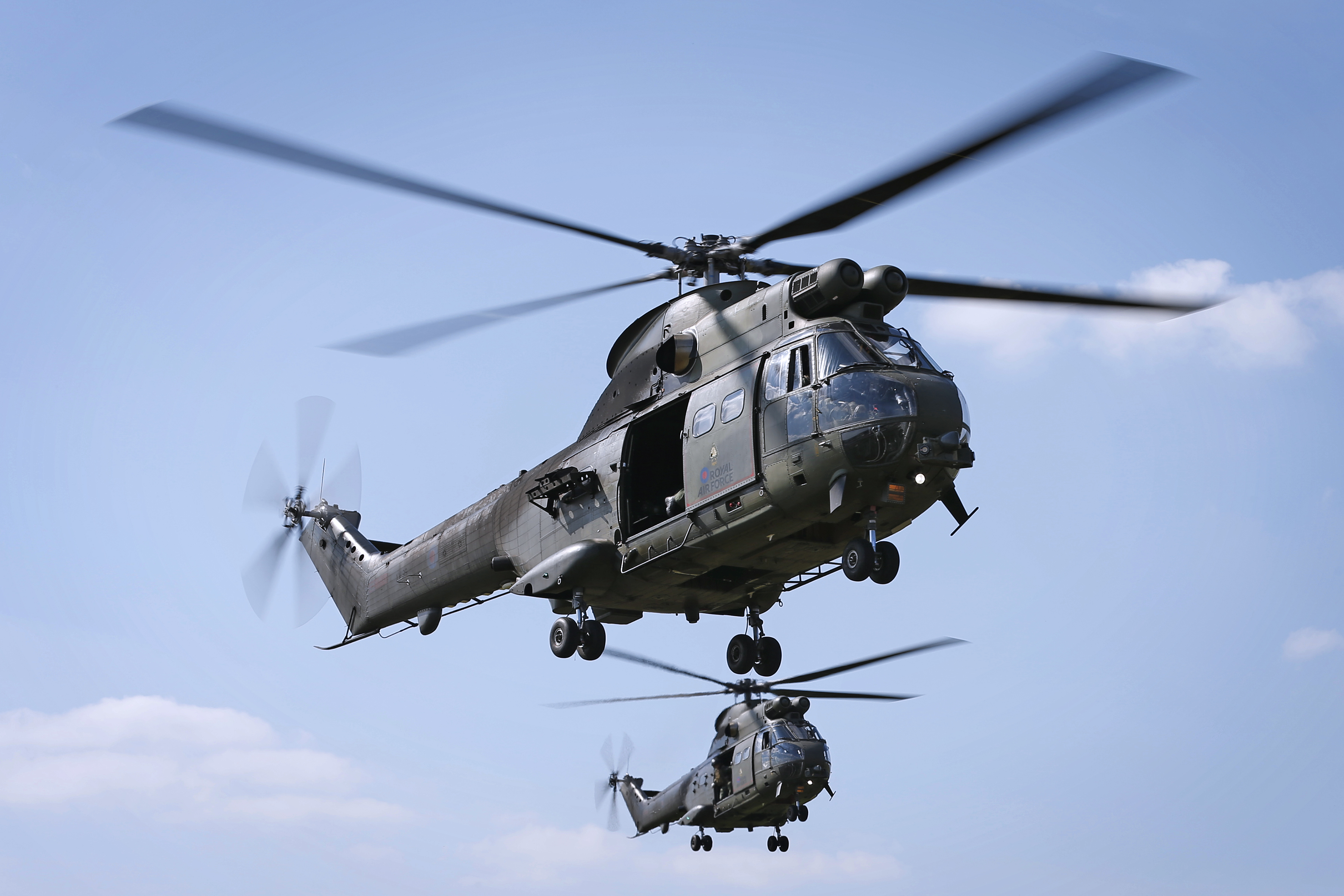
Westland Puma HC2 based at RAF Benson

- Boeing Chinook HC2
- Westland Sea King HC4
- Westland Lynx AH7 and AH9
- Westland Gazelle AH1
- Westland Puma HC1
- Westland Merlin HC3

=== Joint Helicopter Force (Afghanistan) ===
The JHC operation in Afghanistan as part of Operation Herrick was named Joint Helicopter Force Afghanistan (JHF(A)) "Task Force Jaguar".

The following aircraft types served with JHF(A):

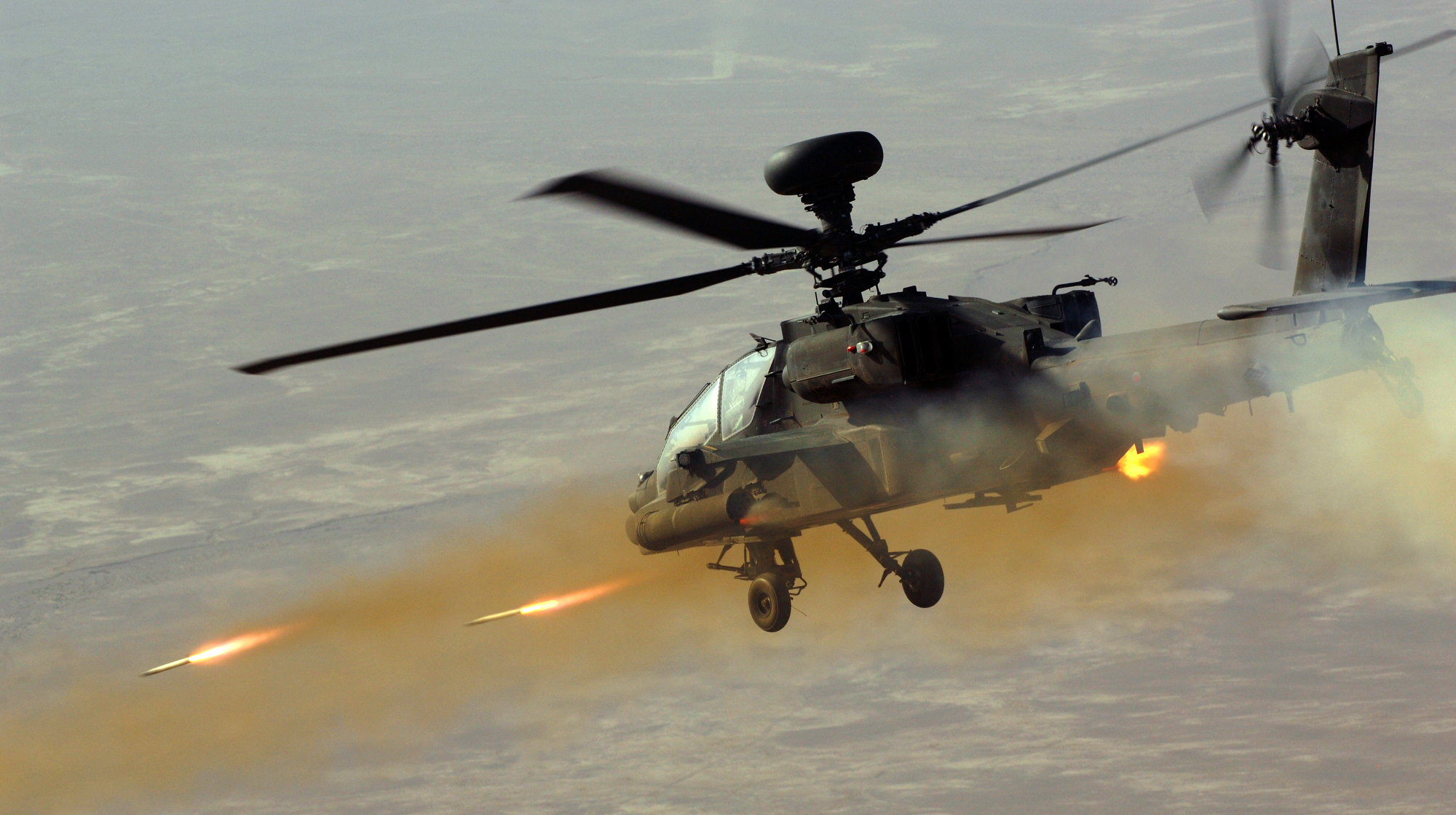
AgustaWestland Apache helicopter firing rockets in Afghanistan

- AgustaWestland Apache AH1
- Boeing Chinook HC2
- Westland Lynx AH7, AH9 and AH9A
- Westland Merlin HC3
- Westland Puma HC1
- Westland Sea King HC4+ and ASaC7

== Structure ==
JAC has its headquarters at the British Army's Marlborough Lines, Andover in Hampshire.

As a force supporting British Army and Royal Marine land operations, it is responsible ultimately to Army Headquarters (United Kingdom).

Formations from each service under Joint Aviation Command include:

=== British Army ===
Army Air Corps

- Army Aviation Centre (AACen) (Middle Wallop)
  - 2 (Training) Regiment – Ground crew training
    - No. 668 (Training) Squadron
    - No. 676 Squadron
  - 7 (Training) Regiment – Flight crew training
    - No. 670 Squadron (RAF Shawbury)
    - No. 671 Squadron
    - No. 673 Squadron – Boeing AH-64E Apache
- 1st Aviation Brigade Combat Team
  - 1 Regiment (RNAS Yeovilton (HMS Heron))
    - No. 652 Squadron – AgustaWestland Wildcat AH1
    - No. 659 Squadron – Wildcat AH1
    - No. 661 Squadron – Wildcat AH1
  - 3 Regiment (Wattisham Flying Station)
    - No. 653 Squadron – Boeing AH-64E Apache
    - No. 662 Squadron – AH-64E Apache
    - No. 663 Squadron – AH-64E Apache
  - 4 Regiment (Wattisham Flying Station)
    - No. 656 Squadron – AH-64E Apache
    - No. 664 Squadron – AH-64E Apache
  - 5 Regiment (Middle Wallop Flying Station)
    - No. 665 Squadron
  - 6 Regiment (Middle Wallop Flying Station)
    - No. 675 (The Rifles) Squadron
    - No. 677 (Suffolk and Norfolk Yeomanry) Squadron
    - No. 679 (The Duke of Connaught's) Squadron
  - 7 Aviation Support Battalion, Royal Electrical and Mechanical Engineers (REME) (Wattisham Flying Station)

Royal Artillery

- 47th Regiment Royal Artillery (Horne Barracks, Larkhill)
  - 10 (Assaye) Battery – Thales Watchkeeper WK450
  - 31 (Headquarters) Battery
  - 43 Battery (Lloyd's Company) – Watchkeeper WK450
  - 74 Battery (The Battle Axe Company) – Watchkeeper WK450
  - 57 Battery (Bhurtpore) - Watchkeeper WK450
- 32nd Regiment Royal Artillery (Roberts Barracks, Larkhill)
  - 46 (Talavera) Headquarters Battery
  - 18 (Quebec 1759) Battery – Miniature Unmanned Aerial Systems
  - 21 (Gibraltar 1779–83) Air Assault Battery – Miniature Unmanned Aerial Systems
  - 22 (Gibraltar 1779–83) Battery – Miniature Unmanned Aerial Systems
  - 42 (Alem Hamza) Battery – Miniature Unmanned Aerial Systems

=== Royal Navy ===
Fleet Air Arm

- Commando Helicopter Force (RNAS Yeovilton)
  - 845 Naval Air Squadron – Merlin HC4
  - 846 Naval Air Squadron – Merlin HC4/4A
  - 847 Naval Air Squadron – Wildcat AH1

=== Royal Air Force ===
- Support Helicopter Force
  - No. 7 Squadron (RAF Odiham) – Chinook
  - No. 18 Squadron (RAF Odiham) – Chinook
  - No. 22 Squadron (JAC Operational Evaluation Unit) (RAF Benson)
  - No. 27 Squadron (RAF Odiham) – Chinook
  - No. 28 Squadron (Operational Conversion Unit) (RAF Benson) – Chinook HC4
  - No. 33 Squadron (RAF Benson) –
  - No. 230 Squadron (Medicina Lines, British Forces Brunei) –
  - Joint Helicopter Support Squadron (RAF Benson)
  - Tactical Supply Wing RAF (MOD Stafford)

== Senior Commanders ==
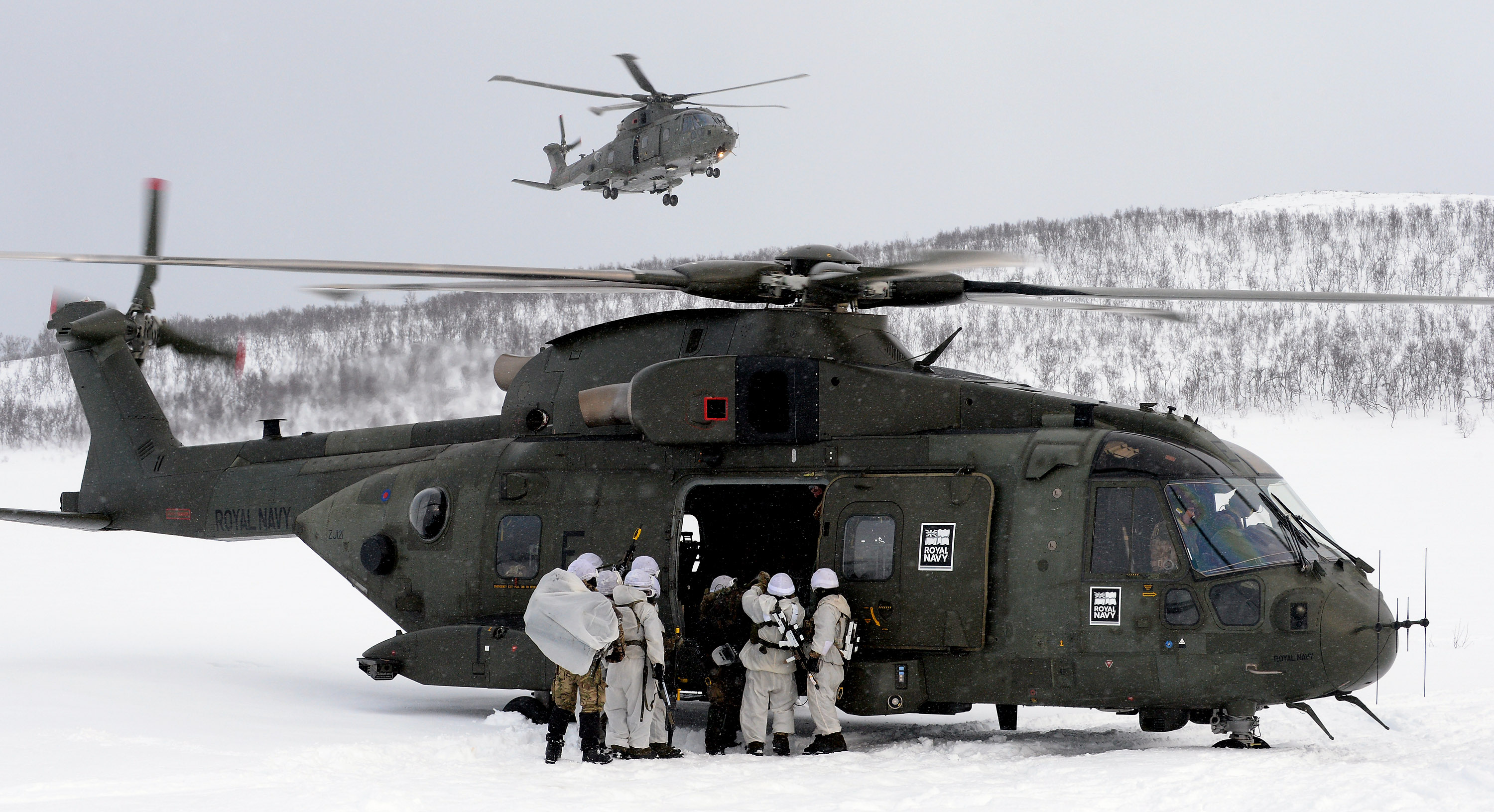
Commando Helicopter Force Merlin HC3 on exercise with Royal Marines in northern Norway

The organisation is commanded by a two-star officer from either the Royal Navy, British Army or Royal Air Force. Commander Joint Helicopter Command has been held by:

- 1999 – 2002 Air Vice-Marshal David Niven
- 2002 – 2005 Air Vice-Marshal Paul Luker
- 2005 – 2008 Major General Gary Coward
- 2008 – 2011 Rear Admiral Tony Johnstone-Burt
- 2011 – 2014 Air Vice-Marshal Carl Dixon
- 2014 – 2017 Major General Richard Felton
- 2017 – 2020 Rear Admiral Jonathan Pentreath
- 2020 – 2023 Air Vice-Marshal Nigel Colman
- 2023 – 2026 Air Vice-Marshal Alastair Smith
- 2026 – present Air Vice-Marshal Lee Turner

== See also ==
- List of Royal Air Force commands
