= Bramcote, Warwickshire =

Village in Warwickshire, England

Coordinates: 52.4766°N 1.4098°W

Bramcote
- Location within Warwickshire
- Population: 321 (2001)
- OS grid reference: SP403886
- Civil parish: Wolvey
- District: Rugby
- Shire county: Warwickshire
- Region: West Midlands
- Country: England
- Sovereign state: United Kingdom
- Post town: NUNEATON
- Postcode district: CV11
- Dialling code: 01455
- Police: Warwickshire
- Fire: Warwickshire
- Ambulance: West Midlands

Bramcote is a village in the Rugby district of Warwickshire in England. It lies approximately 3.3 miles (5.3 km) south-east of Nuneaton, between the Ashby Canal and the River Anker. Historically, Bramcote was a dispersed settlement rather than a nucleated village. Today, its main population centre is Gamecock Barracks, which lies to the south of the B4114 road and west of the M69 motorway. In 2001, Bramcote's population was 321, which included the hamlet of Bramcote Mains a quarter of a mile to the south, and 214 armed-services personnel at Gamecock Barracks. Population details for the 2011 census can be found under Wolvey.

Bramcote Waters golf course lies to the east and Bramcote NHS Hospital to the north. Prior to the barracks at Bramcote being occupied by the Army, it was Royal Naval Air Station Bramcote HMS Gamecock. During the Second World War, it was an RAF station called RAF Bramcote.

== See also ==
- Burdett baronets, of Bramcote
