= 2nd Signal Brigade (United Kingdom) =

Former signal formation of the British Army

2nd Signal Group 2nd (National Communications) Signal Brigade 2nd Signal Group (SCN)
- Cap badge of the Royal Corps of Signals
- Active: 1968–2018
- Country: United Kingdom
- Branch: British Army
- Type: Signals formation
- Size: Originally Group, later expanded to Brigade
- Part of: United Kingdom Land Forces (till 2002); Force Troops Command (till 2012); 11th Signal Brigade and Headquarters West Midlands
- Brigade HQ: Basil Hill Barracks, Corsham

Insignia
- Former brigade formation badge

The 2nd Signal Brigade (later 2nd Signal Group), was a military formation of the British Army composed of Royal Corps of Signals units. The brigade was first formed following the reorganisation of the old Territorial Army in 1967, and was disbanded in 2012 under the Army 2020 programme. However, later the 2nd Signal Group was formed continuing the lineage of the old brigade, before it was disbanded in 2018.

== Background ==
Before the 1966 Defence White Paper and subsequent wide-ranging reorganisation of the Army, signal formations larger than those controlled by a Lieutenant Colonel (ie: battalion (regiment in the RCS)) were rare, and usually only temporary regional formations. However, following that defence paper, eight new 'signal groups', commanded by a Colonel were formed to oversee specialist units with specific duties, including those tasked with supporting the British Army of the Rhine (BAOR).

== Formation ==
On 1 April 1968, Headquarters, 2nd Signal Group (Static Communications Network) was stood up at Aldershot Garrison to command the squadrons which provided fixed communications assets within the United Kingdom. It also oversaw the strategic reserve signal regiment, 10 Signal Regiment. The group, though having changed names and units several times, maintained this role till its disbandment as a group in 2018. Therefore, on formation the group oversaw the following units:

- Headquarters, 2nd Signal Group, at Aldershot Garrison
- 233 Signal Squadron (Northern Ireland), Royal Corps of Signals, at Thiepval Barracks, Lisburn
- 240 Signal Squadron (Northern Command), Royal Corps of Signals, at Fishergate House, York - supporting Northern Command
  - Signal Works Service Troop
  - HQ Northern Command Communication Centre, at Fishergate House, York
- 241 Signal Squadron (Western Command), Royal Corps of Signals, at Churchill House, Chester - supporting Western Command
  - Signal Works Service Troop
  - HQ Western Command Communication Centre, at Capital House, Chester
- 242 Signal Squadron (Scottish Command), Royal Corps of Signals, at Craigiehall, Edinburgh
  - Signal Works Service Troop
  - HQ Scotland (Army) Communication Centre, at Craighall, Edinburgh)
- 10th Signal Regiment (Southern Command), Royal Corps of Signals, at Cavalry Barracks, Hounslow
  - HQ London District Communication Centre, at Horse Guards, Whitehall, London

== Cold War ==
In 1972, 13th Signal Group (Volunteers) HQ was disbanded, and its three regiments transferred to 2nd Signal Group. The group now oversaw the TA units which had the same roles as their regular counterparts, that of providing fix communications within the United Kingdom. Following 13 Signal Group's integration into 2 Signal Group, the command held the rank of Brigadier. In addition the group was given responsibility for the NATO ACE HIGH early warning system, and strategic communication links. The new group now included the above units plus the following:

- Headquarters, 2nd Signal Brigade, at Basil Hill Barracks, Corsham
- 32nd (Scottish) Signal Regiment, Royal Corps of Signals (V), in Glasgow
- 37th (Wessex and Welsh) Signal Regiment, Royal Corps of Signals (V), in Bristol
- 38th Signal Regiment, Royal Corps of Signals (V), in Sheffield
- 71st Signal Regiment, Royal Corps of Signals (V), in Bromley – formed in 1972 and placed under command of the group, not originally part of 13 Signal Group, joined after merger

In 1982, as part of the 1981 Defence White Paper and 'Notts Review', the group was redesignated as 2nd Signal Brigade. In 1987, 1st Signal Group was disbanded and most of its responsibilities transferred to 2nd Signal Brigade. The brigade's area of responsibility subsequently expanded that year, including direct communications support for HQ UKLF and oversaw much of the Salisbury Plain and Wiltshire District areas. That year, brigade HQ moved from Aldershot Garrison to Basil Hill Barracks, Corsham. In 1989, just before the end of the Cold War, the brigade formed part of United Kingdom Land Forces and was organised as follows:

- Headquarters, 2nd Signal Brigade, at Basil Hill Barracks, Corsham
- 244 Signal Squadron (Air Support), Royal Corps of Signals, at RAF Brize Norton – provides static communications for UK-based RAF bases
- 55 (West Lancashire) Signal Squadron, Royal Corps of Signals (V), in Liverpool
- 32nd (Scottish) Signal Regiment, Royal Corps of Signals (V), in Glasgow
- 37th (Wessex and Welsh) Signal Regiment, Royal Corps of Signals (V), in Bristol
- 38th Signal Regiment, Royal Corps of Signals (V), in Sheffield
- 71st (Yeomanry) Signal Regiment, Royal Corps of Signals (V), in Bromley
  - 348 (Inns of Court & City Yeomanry) Signal Squadron, Royal Corps of Signals (Home Service Force) – formed in 1987
- National Defence Communications
- Communications and Security Group (United Kingdom), at Imjin Barracks, Innsworth
  - No. 4 Communications Company (Royal Corps of Signals), at Imjin Barracks, Innsworth

== Post Cold War ==
Following the Dissolution of the Soviet Union and subsequent end to the Cold War, the British Army was reorganised, seeing a 1/3 of its strength being lost. However, luckily for the 2nd Signal Brigade, now known as 2nd (National Communications) Signal Brigade, very few changes occurred, and those changes mostly being expansions. As part of the reductions, the 12th Signal Groups (Volunteers) was disbanded and its units moved under the 2nd or 11th Signal Brigades. By now, the brigade was organised as follows [by 1996]:

- Headquarters, 2nd Signal Brigade, at Basil Hill Barracks, Corsham
- 2 (City of Dundee) Signal Squadron, Royal Corps of Signals (V), in Dundee
- 31st (City of London) Signal Regiment, Royal Corps of Signals (V), in Southfields, London (from 11 Sig Gp)
- 32nd (Scottish) Signal Regiment, Royal Corps of Signals (V), in Glasgow
- 37th (Wessex and Welsh) Signal Regiment, Royal Corps of Signals (V), in Bristol
- 38th (City of Sheffield )Signal Regiment, Royal Corps of Signals (V), in Sheffield
- 39th (Skinners) Signal Regiment, Royal Corps of Signals (V), in Bristol
- 71st (Yeomanry) Signal Regiment, Royal Corps of Signals (V), in Bexleyheath

== Modern Day ==
The brigade was once again relieved from any major cuts after the Strategic Defence Review and the Future Army Structure (FAS) programme shortly afterwards. In August 2001, the Brigade Mission was changed to reflect the Brigade's continuous execution of a wide range of tasks, its unique capability and its wider utility. Changes brought upon the brigade were dramatic, with the regional affiliations being completely dropped, the brigade now forming part of HQ Theatre Troops, and all TA regional units brought under its command. This included the soon to be reformed 10th Signal Regiment. The group's priority also switch to that of national defence, with each regiment providing at-least one (though most had 2) signal squadrons to support the regional brigades. Therefore, by 2009 the brigade was organised as follows:

- Headquarters, 2nd Signal Brigade, at Basil Hill Barracks, Corsham
- 1 (Royal Buckinghamshire Yeomanry) Signal Squadron (Special Communications), Royal Corps of Signals (V), in Bletchley
- 2 (City of Dundee) Signal Squadron, Royal Corps of Signals (V), in Dundee
- 43 (Wessex) Signal Squadron (Air Support), Royal Corps of Signals (V), in Bath – administrative command only, under operational control of regular 21 Signal Regiment (Air Support)
- 10th Signal Regiment, Royal Corps of Signals, at Basil Hill Barracks, Corsham – overseeing the regional signal squadrons, each supporting the regenerative divisions
- 31st (City of London) Signal Regiment, Royal Corps of Signals (V), in Southfields, London
- 32nd (Scottish) Signal Regiment, Royal Corps of Signals (V), in Glasgow
- 36th (Eastern) Signal Regiment, Royal Corps of Signals (V), in Ilford
- 37th (Wessex and Welsh) Signal Regiment, Royal Corps of Signals (V), in Bristol
- 38th (City of Sheffield) Signal Regiment, Royal Corps of Signals (V), in Sheffield
- 39th (Skinners) Signal Regiment, Royal Corps of Signals (V), in Bristol
- 40th (Ulster) Signal Regiment, Royal Corps of Signals (V), in Belfast
- 71st (Yeomanry) Signal Regiment, Royal Corps of Signals (V), in Bexleyheath
- Central Volunteer Headquarters, Royal Corps of Signals (V), at Basil Hill Barracks, Corsham

Following the effects of the Great Recession, a further 'chapter' was added to the FAS, which saw (at-least for the Royal Corps of Signals) a large reduction in those units still using the old PTARMIGAN communications system. Thereby freeing up funds which would have converted these units to the system. Then, in 2009, as part of the reorganisation of the entire Territorial Army, wholesale mergers and disbandments took place. Under this re-structuring, the brigade was significantly reduced in size, with 1 Sqn disbanding and being absorbed as 801 Signal Troop in 299 Signal Squadron (1 Signal Brigade), 43 Signal Sqn joining 21 Signal Regiment full-time, and the largest changes: 31 (City of London), 36 (Eastern), 38 (City of Sheffield), and 40 (Ulster) Signal Regiments all disbanding by 2009/2010 shortly thereafter.

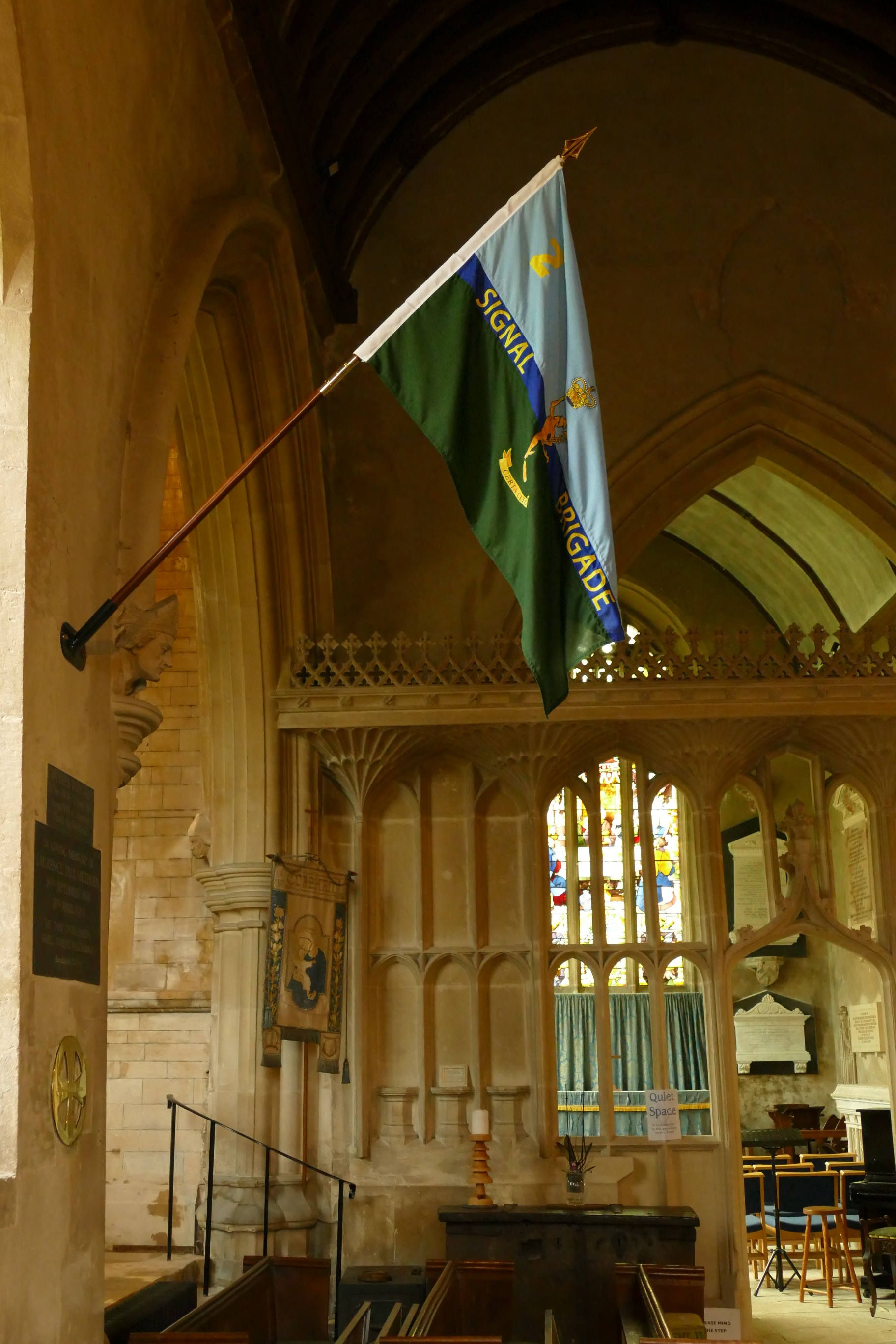

== Army 2020 ==
In 2013, following the Army 2020 re-organisation, the brigade was disbanded and subsequently reorganised as the 2nd Signal Group. Now forming part of the 11th Signal Brigade and Headquarters West Midlands, the group held the same role as the former brigade, as a national communications and regional support formation. The group's structure was very similar to that of the former brigade:

- Headquarters, 2nd Signal Group, at Venning Barracks, Donnington
- 10th Signal Regiment, Royal Corps of Signals, at Basil Hill Barracks, Corsham – providing regional specialist technical support
- 15th Signal Regiment (Information Support), Royal Corps of Signals, at Blandford Camp – providing specialist technical support
- 32nd Signal Regiment, Royal Corps of Signals, in Glasgow – Army Reserve, paired with 2nd Signal Regiment in 7th Signal Group
- 37th Signal Regiment, Royal Corps of Signals, in Redditch – Army Reserve, paired with 1st and 16th Signal Regiments in 7th Signal Group
- 39th Signal Regiment (Skinners), Royal Corps of Signals, in Bristol – Army Reserve, paired with 21st Signal Regiment in 7th Signal Group
- 71st (City of London) Yeomanry Signal Regiment, Royal Corps of Signals, in Bexleyheath – Army Reserve, paired with 3rd (United Kingdom) Divisional Signal Regiment in 7th Signal Group

The Brigade Flag of 2nd (National Communications) Signal Brigade was formally handed over and laid up in a ceremonial service in St Bartholomew's Church, Corsham on 16 April 2024.

== Commanders ==
Commanders of the group/brigade included:

- –15 October 1969, Colonel G. Peat, OBE (died at home while in command)
- 1970, Colonel F. M. S. Winter
- Brigadier John C. Clinch, 1 January 1972–March 1974
- Brigadier Peter A. C. Baldwin, March 1974–January 1976
- Brigadier Patrick H. F. Webb, January 1976–March 1978
- Brigadier Arthur L. Dowell, March 1978–April 1980
- Brigadier J. P. Hart, April 1980–May 1983
- Brigadier Keith H. Olds, May 1983–June 1986
- Brigadier J. A. P. Russell, June 1986 – 1987
- [Between 1987 and 1992, Commander, Communications, United Kingdom Land Forces held the position commanding officer of the brigade]
- Brigadier Colin A. Brown, 1992–May 1993
- Brigadier John E. Neeve, May 1993–June 1996
- Brigadier S. Mervyn A. Lee, June 1996–June 1997
- Brigadier S. Gordon Hughes, June 1997–February 2000
- Brigadier Nigel C. Jackson, February 2000–August 2002
- Brigadier John E. Thomas, August 2002–September 2004
- Brigadier Michael Lithgow, September 2004–October 2006
- Brigadier David A. Hargreaves, November 2006–March 2010
- Brigadier Stephen J. Vickery, March 2010 – 2012
