= Central Volunteer Headquarters, Royal Corps of Signals =

- CVHQ, Royal Corps of Signals
- Cap badge of the Royal Corps of Signals
- Active: 2001–Present
- Country: United Kingdom
- Branch: British Army
- Type: Military headquarters
- Part of: 11th Signal Brigade and Headquarters West Midlands
- Garrison/HQ: Basil Hill Barracks, Corsham

Insignia
- Tactical Recognition Flash

Central Volunteer Headquarters, Royal Corps of Signals (CVHQ, Royal Corps of Signals) is a special administrative group of the Royal Corps of Signals formed to oversee the national reserve units of the corps.

== History ==
Central Volunteer Headquarters, Royal Corps of Signals (CVHQ, Royal Corps of Signals) was formed in October 2001 to look after TA specialists of the Signals. The new unit was organised as follows:

- Headquarters, CVHQ, Royal Corps of Signals, at Basil Hill Barracks, Corsham
- 81 Signal Squadron – under operational control of 10th Signal Regiment
- Land Information Assurance Group
- Land Information and Communications Services Group
- Royal Corps of Signals Specialist Pool
- Royal Corps of Signals Full Time Reserve Service

From its formation in 2001, the CVHQ formed part of 2nd (National Communications) Signal Brigade until that brigade's disbandment in late 2009. Following the brigade's disbandment, the CVHQ join the 11th Signal Brigade with the same role and organisation. One year after the formation of the group, 81 Signal Squadron was moved under command of 10th Signal Regiment permanently.

Under the Army 2020 programme, the Land Information Assurance Group moved under Joint Forces Command, while the remainder of the CVHQ remained at its position and station. Under the Army 2020 programme, on 1 May 2014, the Land Information and Communications Services Group was redesignated as 254 (Specialist Group Information Services) Signal Squadron and formed a new sub-unit, designated as the Joint Cyber Unit in 2013.

Under the reorganisation of the Royal Corps of Signals in June 2020, the Joint Cyber Unit was moved under command of the new 13th Signal Regiment forming 224 (Cyber Protection Team) Signal Squadron.
