= 13 Signal Group (United Kingdom) =

13th Signal Group
- Active: 1967 - 1972
- Disbanded: 1972
- Country: United Kingdom
- Branch: Army
- Role: Military Communications
- Size: Signal Group
- Part of: United Kingdom Land Forces
- Garrison/HQ: Aldershot

The 13th Signals Group was a military communications brigade sized formation of the British Army. The group was established in 1967 to control the territorial signals regiments with national communication duties in the United Kingdom. It was later disbanded in 1974, when it merged with the 2nd Signal Group.

== History ==
The group was formed in 1967 for the overall command of the territorial signal regiments with "National Communication" duties. Its units were specifically tasked with helping local and national signals with helping governmental and military major organizations; I.e. Ministry of Defence and 2nd Infantry Division. Because of cuts later on, It was later absorbed into the 2nd Signal Group, in 1972.

== Structure ==
The structure of the group stayed the same its entire history. Upon formation, it included the following units:

- HQ 13th Signal Group
  - 32 (Scottish) Signal Regiment (Volunteers)
    - Headquarters Squadron
    - 51 (Highland) Signal Squadron
    - 52 (Lowland) Signal Squadron
    - 61 (City of Edinburgh) Signal Squadron
    - 82 (Army Emergency Reserve) Signal Squadron
  - 37th (Wessex and Welsh) Signal Regiment (Volunteers)
    - Headquarters Squadron
    - 43 (Wessex) Signal Squadron
    - 53 (Welsh) Signal Squadron
    - 57 (City and County of Bristol) Signal Squadron
  - 38 (City of Sheffield) Signal Regiment (Volunteers)
    - 64 (City of Sheffield) Headquarters Squadron
    - 46 (Derbyshire) Signal Squadron
    - 87 (City of Nottingham) Signal Squadron
    - 93 (East Lancashire) Signal Squadron
