= MOD Boddington =

- Near Barrow, Gloucestershire in England

Site information
- Type: Communications station
- Owner: Ministry of Defence
- Controlled by: RAF Support Command (1978-1998); DCSA (1998-2007); ISS (2007–2019); Defence Digital (2019–present)

Location
- Coordinates: 51°55′18″N 002°09′55″W
- Area: 2 hectares

Site history
- Built: 1940
- In use: 1940-present

MOD Boddington is an installation of Defence Digital (formerly Information Systems & Services), an operating cluster of the Ministry of Defence. It was formerly RAF Boddington, a non-flying Royal Air Force station located in Boddington, Gloucestershire, England, and was the former home of No. 9 Signals Unit RAF.

Boddington was the first computerised communication centre in the 1950s when it was run by the British Army. The tradition of computerised relay communications has continued to the present day.

== History ==
The station was established in 1940 as an army telephone exchange operated by the Auxiliary Territorial Service under the guard of the Gloucestershire Regiment. It was later controlled by the Royal Corps of Signals before passing to the Royal Air Force.

On 1 October 1978 RAF Boddington became No. 9 Signals Unit (No. 9 SU), an independent Unit under the control of RAF Support Command Signals Headquarters (SCSHQ), with functional control of their respective networks by Controller Defence Communications Network (CDCN) and Headquarters RAF Strike Command (HQSTC).

In 1998 operational command of Boddington transferred to the newly formed Defence Communication Services Agency (DCSA), with the unit becoming known as DCSA 9 SU Boddington. The unit was subsequently chosen as the Primary Message Agent site for the United Kingdom as part of the Automated Messaging Systems Communications Equipment Replacement Programme (AMSCERP) which provided secure messaging services for the RAF and British Army.

The facility was upgraded in 2006 during which time temporary buildings were used to accommodate IT equipment.

== Post RAF use ==
Although the site ceased to be an RAF station in December 2007, it was retained by the Ministry of Defence (MOD) as a communications station. The site was then known as ISS Boddington, having initially been operated by the Defence Communication Services Agency (DCSA) then Information Systems and Services (ISS), and since 2019 Defence Digital transitioning to the name MOD Boddington.
