= Royal Buckinghamshire Yeomanry =

- Cap badge of the Yeomanry
- Active: 1794–present
- Country: Kingdom of Great Britain (1794–1800); United Kingdom (1801–present)
- Branch: Army Reserve
- Type: Yeomanry (First World War); Royal Artillery (Second World War); Operational Hygiene Squadron (current)
- Role: Operational Hygiene Squadron
- Size: Three Regiments (First World War); One Regiment (Second World War); One Squadron (current)
- Garrison/HQ: Aylesbury
- Engagements: Second Boer War; First World War Gallipoli 1915 Egypt 1915–17 Palestine 1917–18 France and Flanders 1918 Second World War

Commanders
- Notable commanders: Richard Plantagenet, 2nd Duke of Buckingham and Chandos (1797-1861), Colonel of the Buckingham Yeomanry Cavalry, 1841

The Royal Buckinghamshire Yeomanry is an Operational Hygiene Squadron of the Royal Logistic Corps, originally formed as cavalry in 1794, and has also served in artillery and signals roles. The lineage is continued by 710 (Royal Buckinghamshire Hussars) Operational Hygiene Squadron, 165 Port and Maritime Regiment RLC.

== French Revolutionary and Napoleonic Wars ==
In March 1794 the government of William Pitt the Younger passed the Volunteer Act in response to the threat of invasion by French revolutionary forces. The act sought to encourage "gentlemen of weight or property" to establish volunteer military formations. The Prime Minister proposed that the Counties form a force of Volunteer Yeoman Cavalry which could be called on by the King to defend the country against invasion, or by the Lord Lieutenant to subdue any civil disorder within his county.

A public meeting held in Aylesbury on 3 May 1794 resolved to raise such a force in Buckinghamshire, and soon Troops of Buckinghamshire Armed Yeomanry were in existence at Amersham, Aylesbury, Buckingham, Burnham, High Wycombe and Newport Pagnell, the earliest dating from 8 May. Most of the costs were borne by the Earl of Chesterfield and the Lord Lieutenant of Buckinghamshire, the Marquess of Buckingham.

Most of the Volunteers and Yeomanry were stood down after the Peace of Amiens in 1802, but this broke down the following year and units were formed or reformed. On 16 July 1803 the independent Yeomanry troops in Buckinghamshire were regimented into the 1st (or Southern), 2nd (or Middle) and 3rd (or Northern) Regiments of Buckinghamshire Cavalry, with the Marquess of Buckingham as lord lieutenant serving as Colonel of all three.

== 19th century ==
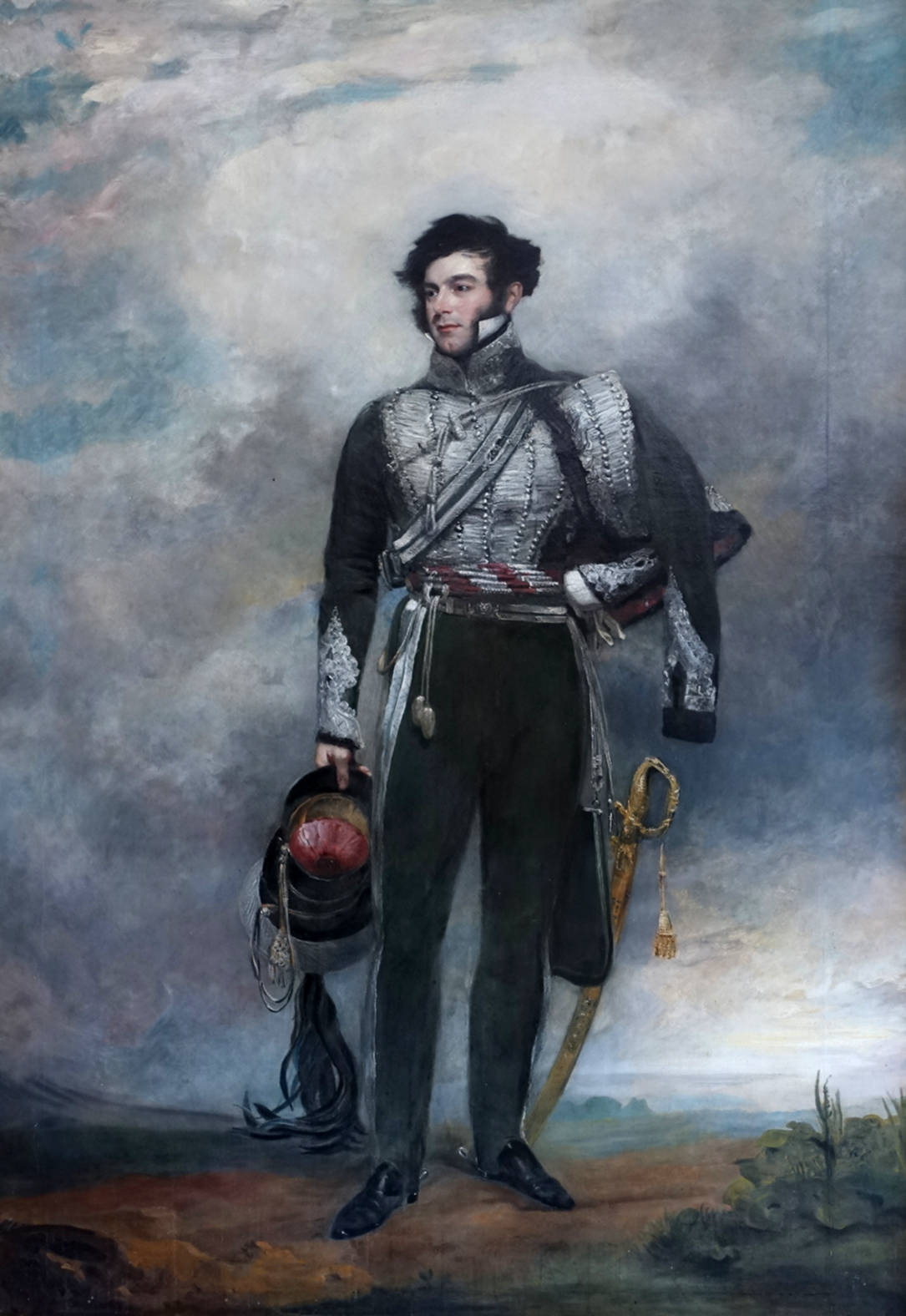
1830 portrait of the Marquess of Chandos as an officer in the 2nd Buckinghamshire Yeomanry Cavalry

Following the Battle of Waterloo in 1815 the British Volunteer Corps was fully disbanded and its mounted contingent, the Yeomanry Cavalry, was allowed to stand down if they wished. However, most yeomanry regiments, including the three in Buckinghamshire, volunteered to continue their service. Although not called upon, the 2nd Regiment was under orders to go to Manchester in July 1819, before the Peterloo Massacre. In 1827 the War Office withdrew support from the Yeomanry Cavalry. The 1st and 3rd Regiments were disbanded the following year, and the 2nd Regiment was only kept in existence by being privately funded by the Marquess of Chandos. However, further civil disorder, with Buckinghamshire being affected by the Swing Riots, led to a change in policy, and pay was restored to the Yeomanry in 1830. The regiment was accepted as the 2nd Buckinghamshire Yeomanry Cavalry, together with a newly raised independent troop at Taplow commanded by Viscount Kirkwall (the disbanded 1st Regiment had included a Taplow Troop). The 2nd Regiment included two 6-pounder cannons, first issued in 1820.

The regiment was called out to deal with rioting at Otmoor in Oxfordshire from 6 to 10 September 1830, followed by duty at Hounslow Barracks, Great Marlow, High Wycombe and Brill from 22 November to 7 December. The regiment was then quartered at Aylesbury, 9–15 January 1831, and the new Taplow Troop at Princes Risborough, to protect the Special Commissioners trying the Swing rioters. The War Office withdrew funding from the Taplow Troop in 1838, but it continued to train without pay.

Officers of the Buckinghamshire Yeomanry had worn a Hussar-style undress jacket and Pelisse in the 1820s, but in the 1830s the regiment was equipped and dressed as Light Dragoons. However, for Queen Victoria's visit to the Duke of Buckingham at Stowe House in 1844, the regiment formed two troops of Hussars. The following year the Queen conferred the title 'Royal' on the regiment, as the 2nd Royal Bucks Regiment of Yeomanry Cavalry, later known as the Buckinghamshire Yeomanry Cavalry (Royal Bucks Hussars) – it had adopted Hussar uniforms throughout by 1850.

At the time of the Chartist disturbances in 1848, the Royal Bucks, under Colonel commandant Chandos (by now the 2nd Duke of Buckingham and Chandos) relieved the 1st Life Guards at Windsor Barracks so that the Regulars could be deployed in London. The Taplow Troop also offered its services at Slough, but was not required. By 1850 the Royal Bucks consisted of eight troops, including the gun troop. The Taplow Troop officially became the South Buckinghamshire Yeomanry Cavalry some time after 1850, but once it adopted a lancer style uniform in 1863 it was generally known as the Taplow Lancers. However, it struggled to find recruits and was disbanded in 1871 when the remaining members were absorbed in to the Royal Bucks.

Chandos died in 1861, and the following year his son took over command of the Royal Bucks Hussars with the rank of lieutenant-colonel commandant. He had a junior lieutenant-colonel as his second-in-command. The 6-pounders were handed in and gun troop converted to cavalry in 1875. The 3rd Duke of Buckingham died in March 1889, and on 24 April Lord Chesham, a former captain in the 16th Lancers who had joined the Royal Bucks Hussars in 1879, was promoted to commanding officer (CO) with the rank of lieutenant-colonel, while Lt-Col George Morgan, formerly of the 4th Dragoon Guards, who had been the duke's second-in-command, was appointed as the regiment's first Honorary Colonel.

Following the Cardwell Reforms a mobilisation scheme began to appear in the Army List from December 1875. This assigned Regular and Yeomanry units places in an order of battle of corps, divisions and brigades for the 'Active Army', even though these formations were entirely theoretical, with no staff or services assigned. The Buckinghamshire Yeomanry were assigned as 'divisional troops' to 1st Division of I Corps based at Colchester, alongside Regular Army units of infantry, artillery and engineers stationed across Eastern England.This was never more than a paper organisation, but from April 1893 the Army List showed the Yeomanry regiments grouped into brigades for collective training. They were commanded by the senior regimental commanding officer but they did have a Regular Army Brigade major. The Buckinghamshire Yeomanry together with the Queen's Own Oxfordshire Hussars formed the 2nd Yeomanry Brigade, headquartered at Buckingham.

== Imperial Yeomanry ==
=== Second Boer War ===
On 13 December 1899 it was decided to allow volunteer forces serve in the Second Boer War. Due to the string of defeats during Black Week in December 1899, the UK government realized they would need more troops than just the regular army, so on 24 December 1899 a Royal Warrant was issued that created the Imperial Yeomanry.

The Royal Warrant asked standing Yeomanry regiments to provide service companies of approximately 115 men each. In addition to this, many British citizens (usually mid-upper class) volunteered to join the new regiment. Although there were strict requirements, many volunteers were accepted with substandard horsemanship/marksmanship, however they had significant time to train while awaiting transport.

The first contingent of recruits contained 550 officers, 10,371 men in 20 battalions of 4 companies, which arrived in South Africa between February and April 1900. Upon arrival, the regiment was sent throughout the zone of operations. The Buckinghamshire Yeomanry sponsored:

- 37th (Buckinghamshire) Company, 10th Battalion
- 38th (High Wycombe) Company, 10th Battalion
- 56th (Buckinghamshire) Company, 15th Battalion
- 57th (Buckinghamshire) Company, 15th Battalion

Lord Chesham was appointed in command of a battalion of the Imperial Yeomanry in January 1900. The battle honour 'South Africa' was awarded.

On 17 April 1901 the regiment was renamed the Buckinghamshire Imperial Yeomanry (Royal Bucks Hussars) and reorganised in four squadrons and a machine gun section. On 1 April 1908 the regiment was renamed for the final time as the Buckinghamshire Yeomanry (Royal Bucks Hussars) and transferred to the Territorial Force, trained and equipped as hussars. Its organisation was:

	Buckinghamshire Yeomanry (Royal Bucks Hussars)
HQ	Yeomanry House, Buckingham
A Squadron	Buckingham (detachments at Stony Stratford, Bletchley, Newport Pagnell, Akeley)
B Squadron	Aylesbury (detachments at Kimble, Quainton, Wing)
C Squadron	High Wycombe (detachments at Stokenchurch, Taplow, Beaconsfield)
D Squadron	Chesham (detachments at Cholesbury, Chalfont St Peter, Great Missenden)

It was ranked as 21st (of 55) in the order of precedence of the Yeomanry Regiments in the Army List of 1914.

== World War I ==
In accordance with the Territorial and Reserve Forces Act 1907 (7 Edw. 7, c.9) which brought the Territorial Force into being, the TF was intended to be a home defence force for service during wartime and members could not be compelled to serve outside the country. However, on the outbreak of war on 4 August 1914, many members volunteered for Imperial Service. Therefore, TF units were split in August and September 1914 into 1st Line (liable for overseas service) and 2nd Line (home service for those unable or unwilling to serve overseas) units. Later a 3rd Line was formed to act as a reserve, providing trained replacements for the 1st and 2nd Line regiments.

=== 1/1st Royal Buckinghamshire Yeomanry ===
The regiment was mobilised with its brigade on 4 August 1914 upon the outbreak of World War I. Initially it concentrated in Berkshire and on 5 August 1914 joined the 1st Mounted Division. On 2 September it was transferred to the 2nd Mounted Division and in mid November 1914 it moved with its division to Norfolk on coastal defence duties.

In April 1915 the 2nd Mounted Division moved to Egypt arriving at Alexandria between 19 and 21 April and was posted to Cairo by the middle of May. The regiment was dismounted in August 1915 and took part in the Gallipoli Campaign. It left a squadron headquarters and two troops (about 100 officers and men) in Egypt to look after the horses.

They landed at "A" Beach, Suvla Bay on 18 August and moved into bivouacs at Lala Baba on 20 August. On 21 August it advanced to Chocolate Hill via Salt Lake and Hetman Chair and took part in the attack on Scimitar Hill. Due to losses at the Battle of Scimitar Hill and wastage in August 1915, the 2nd Mounted Division had to be reorganised. On 4 September 1915 the 1st Composite Mounted Brigade was formed from the 1st (1st South Midland), 2nd (2nd South Midland) and 5th (Yeomanry) Mounted Brigades. Each brigade formed a battalion sized unit, for example, 2nd South Midland Regiment and each regiment a sub-unit. The brigade embarked for Mudros on 31 October and returned to Egypt in December 1915 where its component units were re-formed and remounted.

The brigade left the 2nd Mounted Division on 17 January 1916 and was sent to the Western Frontier of Egypt as an independent formation. On 31 March 1916 the remaining Mounted Brigades were numbered in a single sequence. As a consequence, the 2nd South Midland Mounted Brigade was redesignated as 6th Mounted Brigade. The brigade served with the Western Frontier Force from January to October 1916. It joined the newly formed Imperial Mounted Division in January 1917 and took part in the First and Second Battles of Gaza.

The complete brigade was transferred to the newly formed Yeomanry Mounted Division on 27 June 1917, joining it at el Maraqeb. From 31 October it took part in the Third Battle of Gaza, including the Battle of Beersheba and the Capture of the Sheria Position. It took part in the Battle of Mughar Ridge on 13 and 14 November and the Battle of Nebi Samwil from 17 to 24 November. From 27 to 29 November, it withstood the Turkish counter-attacks during the Capture of Jerusalem.

In March 1918 the 1st Indian Cavalry Division was broken up in France. The British units (notably 6th (Inniskilling) Dragoons, 17th Lancers, 1/1st Queen's Own Yorkshire Dragoons and A, Q and U Batteries RHA) remained in France and the Indian elements were sent to Egypt. By an Egyptian Expeditionary Force GHQ Order of 12 April 1918 the mounted troops of the EEF were reorganised when the Indian Army units arrived in theatre. On 24 April 1918 the Yeomanry Mounted Division was indianized (Note: British divisions were converted to the British Indian Army standard whereby brigades only retained one British regiment or battalion and most support units were Indian (artillery excepted).) and its title was changed to 1st Mounted Division, the third distinct division to bear this title. (Note: See 1st Mounted Division and 3rd Mounted Division.) On 24 April 1918 the 6th Mounted Brigade was merged with elements of the 5th (Mhow) Cavalry Brigade: the Royal Buckinghamshire Hussars and the Berkshire Yeomanry left the brigade on 4 April and were merged to form C Battalion, Machine Gun Corps. They were replaced by 2nd Lancers (Gardner's Horse) and 38th King George's Own Central India Horse from 5th (Mhow) Cavalry Brigade.

C Battalion, MGC was posted to France, arriving on 28 June 1918. In August 1918 it was renumbered as 101st (Bucks. & Berks. Yeo.) Battalion, Machine Gun Corps. They remained on the Western Front for the rest of the war. At the Armistice, it was serving as Army Troops with the Second Army.

=== 2/1st Royal Buckinghamshire Yeomanry ===
The 2nd Line regiment was formed at Buckingham on 9 September 1914. By March 1915 it was with 2/2nd South Midland Mounted Brigade in 2/2nd Mounted Division and was at King's Lynn in Norfolk. On 31 March 1916 the remaining Mounted Brigades were ordered to be numbered in a single sequence and the brigade became the 11th Mounted Brigade (and the division 3rd Mounted Division).

In July 1916 there was a major reorganization of 2nd Line yeomanry units in the United Kingdom. All but 12 regiments were converted to cyclists; the 2/1st Royal Buckinghamshire Yeomanry remained mounted and transferred to the 1st Mounted Brigade in the new 1st Mounted Division (3rd Mounted Division redesignated) at Brentwood. In March 1917 it moved to Much Hadham and in April back to Brentwood.

In August 1917 the regiment was converted to a cyclist unit in 11th Cyclist Brigade, The Cyclist Division and was stationed at Canterbury. There were no further changes before the end of the war. It began disbanding in March 1919.

=== 3/1st Royal Buckinghamshire Yeomanry ===
The 3rd Line regiment was formed in 1915; in the summer it was affiliated to the 7th Reserve Cavalry Regiment at Tidworth. Early in 1917 it was absorbed into the 3rd Reserve Cavalry Regiment at Aldershot.

== Between the wars ==
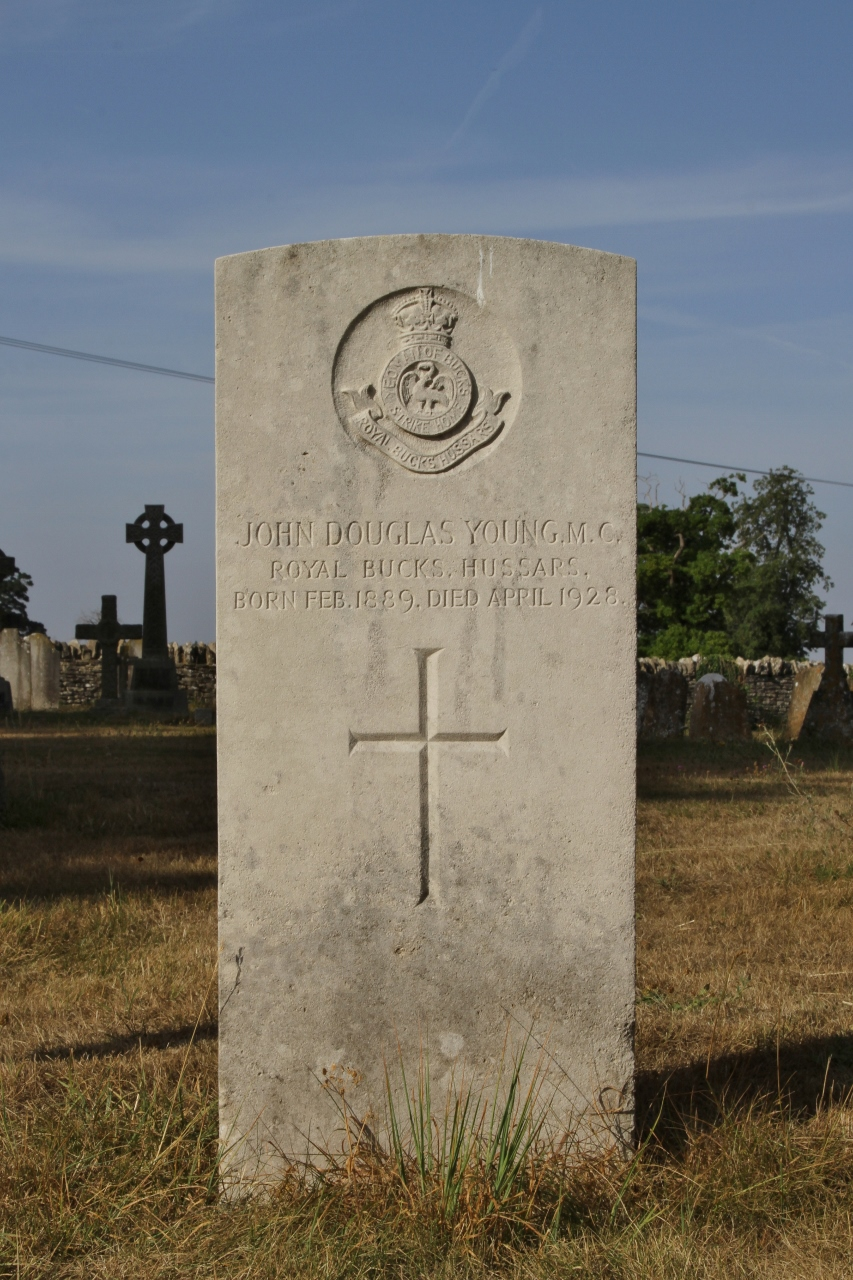
Headstone in All Saints' parish churchyard, Middleton Stoney, Oxfordshire, to a member of the regiment who died in 1928

On 7 February 1920 the regiment was reconstituted in the Territorial Army with HQ still at Aylesbury. Following the experience of the war, it was decided that only the 14 most senior yeomanry regiments would be retained as horsed cavalry, with the rest being transferred to other roles. As a result, on 29 April 1921 the regiment was amalgamated with the Berkshire Yeomanry and simultaneously transferred to the Royal Artillery to form 99th (Buckinghamshire and Berkshire) Brigade, RFA with HQ at Aylesbury.

The two yeomanry regiments retained their own identities and badges within the amalgamated unit, with each providing two batteries. The Buckinghamshire Yeomanry formed 393 (Royal Bucks Yeomanry) Battery at Aylesbury and 394 (Royal Bucks Yeomanry) Battery at High Wycombe.

The brigade underwent a number of redesignations before the outbreak of World War II. In February 1922 it regained its yeomanry title as 99th (Buckinghamshire and Berkshire Yeomanry) Brigade, RFA. Another title change came in June 1924 as the Royal Field Artillery was reamalgamated back into the Royal Artillery and it became 99th (Buckinghamshire and Berkshire Yeomanry) (Army) Field Brigade, RA. The final change came in November 1938 as artillery brigades became regiments, hence 99th (Buckinghamshire and Berkshire Yeomanry) Field Regiment, RA. The brigade/regiment served as 'Army Troops' in 48th (South Midland) Divisional Area.

By 1939 it became clear that a new European war was likely to break out, and the doubling of the Territorial Army was authorised, with each unit forming a duplicate. The Berkshire and Buckinghamshire Yeomanry were separated on 25 August 1939, with each being reconstituted as field regiments of the Royal Artillery. The Buckinghamshire contingent became 99th Field Regiment, Royal Artillery and the Berkshire contingent became 145th Field Regiment, Royal Artillery.

== World War II ==
With the outbreak of war in September 1939, 99th (Buckinghamshire and Berkshire Yeomanry) Field Regiment, Royal Artillery was mobilised at Aylesbury, assigned to 48th (South Midland) Division. In January 1940 they were sent to France, as part of the BEF, seeing active service in that country and in Belgium.

Field regiments were organised in 1938 into two 12-gun batteries. The experience of the BEF in 1940 showed the problem with this organisation: field regiments were intended to support an infantry brigade of three battalions. This could not be managed without severe disruption to the regiment. As a result, field regiments were reorganised into three 8-gun batteries. Following the Dunkirk evacuation the regiment was based in the East Riding of Yorkshire, where it was reorganized into three batteries (A, B and C) on 3 July 1940. The three batteries were numbered 398, 399 and 472 on 1 February 1941. On 12 May 1942 the regiment was redesignated 99th Field Regiment, RA (Buckinghamshire Yeomanry) (TA).

In June 1942 the regiment were sent out to the Far East and attached to the 2nd Division, seeing service in India and Burma, including the Battle of the Arakan. In 1944 it took part in the Allied advance and involved in the Battles of Kohima, Imphal, Rangoon and Mandalay.

In 1945 after the end of the war they returned to Calcutta in India for demobilisation. The regiment was placed in suspended animation on 30 September 1946.

== Postwar ==
The regiment was re-formed in 1947 as the 299th (Royal Buckinghamshire Yeomanry) Field Regiment R.A. In 1950 it was once again amalgamated, this time with the Queen's Own Oxfordshire Hussars, to form the 299th (Bucks and Oxfordshire Yeomanry) Field Regiment, R.A. In 1956 the regiment merged once more with 345th (Berkshire Yeomanry) Medium Regiment, RA, in which The Buckinghamshire Yeomanry contributed RHQ and 'P' Battery to 299th (Royal Bucks Yeomanry, Queens Own Oxfordshire Hussars and Berkshire) Field Regiment, RA (TA). Then in 1961 it merged once more with 431st Light Anti-Aircraft Regiment, RA, without changing title

In 1967 on the formation of the T.A.V.R., the regiment was reduced to battery size as P Battery (Royal Bucks Yeomanry) The Buckinghamshire Regiment, R.A. (T) and then in 1969 it was reduced to cadre size. In 1971 a new role emerged, this time as infantry, the unit becoming the 2nd Battalion, The Wessex Volunteers. On the disbandment of that battalion the Royal Buckinghamshire title was adopted by 1 (Royal Buckinghamshire Yeomanry) Signal Squadron.

== Modern day ==
Until 2014, 1 (Royal Buckinghamshire Yeomanry) Signal Squadron (Special Communications) was one of two British Army special communication units (the other being 2 (City of Dundee) Signal Squadron). They provided operational specialist communications in locations around the world. The unit was made up of Regular and TA soldiers, and had a total strength of approximately 100. The squadron was formed in 1995 by the amalgamation of 602 Signal Troop (Special Communications) and 1 Squadron 39th Signal Regiment (Special Communications) (Volunteers). The yeomanry lineage was adopted by 1st (Royal Buckinghamshire Yeomanry) Signal Squadron (Special Communications) in 1996.

On 1 January 2014, 710 (Royal Buckinghamshire Hussars) Operational Hygiene Squadron, The Royal Logistic Corps was formed as part of the changes under the Army 2020 plan. In its reduced but essential role the unit forms part of 165 Port and Maritime Regiment RLC, whose RHQ is based in Plymouth.

== Battle honours ==
The Royal Buckinghamshire Yeomanry has been awarded the following battle honours:

Second Boer War

South Africa 1900-01

World War I

Arras 1918, Scarpe 1918, Ypres 1918, Courtrai, France and Flanders 1918, Suvla, Scimitar Hill, Gallipoli 1915, Egypt 1915–17, Gaza, El Mughar, Nebi Samwil, Palestine 1917–18

World War II

The Royal Artillery was present in nearly all battles and would have earned most of the honours awarded to cavalry and infantry regiments. In 1833 William IV awarded the motto Ubique (meaning "everywhere") in place of all battle honours.

== See also ==
- Imperial Yeomanry
- List of Yeomanry Regiments 1908
- Yeomanry
- Yeomanry order of precedence
- British yeomanry during the First World War
- Second line yeomanry regiments of the British Army
- List of British Army Yeomanry Regiments converted to Royal Artillery

== Bibliography ==
- Maj A.F. Becke,History of the Great War: Order of Battle of Divisions, Part 2a: The Territorial Force Mounted Divisions and the 1st-Line Territorial Force Divisions (42–56), London: HM Stationery Office, 1935/Uckfield: Naval & Military Press, 2007, ISBN 1-847347-39-8.
- Forty, George (1998). British Army Handbook 1939–1945. Stroud, Gloucestershire: Sutton Publishing Limited. ISBN 0-7509-1403-3.
- J.B.M. Frederick, Lineage Book of British Land Forces 1660–1978, Vol I, Wakefield: Microform Academic, 1984, ISBN 1-85117-007-3.
- J.B.M. Frederick, Lineage Book of British Land Forces 1660–1978, Vol II, Wakefield: Microform Academic, 1984, ISBN 1-85117-009-X.
- Brig E.A. James, British Regiments 1914–18, London: Samson Books, 1978, ISBN 0-906304-03-2/Uckfield: Naval & Military Press, 2001, ISBN 978-1-84342-197-9.
- Kipling, Arthur L; King, Hugh L (2006). Head-Dress Badges of the British Army. Vol. 2: From the End of the Great war to the Present Day. Uckfield: Naval and Military Press. ISBN 1-84342-513-0.
- David J. Knight, 'The Hussar Field Jacket and its Influence on Military Dress', Journal of the Society for Army Historical Research, Vol 96, No 387 (Winter 2018), pp. 205–212.
- Norman E.H. Litchfield, The Territorial Artillery 1908–1988 (Their Lineage, Uniforms and Badges), Nottingham: Sherwood Press, 1992, ISBN 0-9508205-2-0.
- Mileham, Patrick (1994). The Yeomanry Regiments; 200 Years of Tradition. Edinburgh: Canongate Academic. ISBN 1-898410-36-4.
- Perry, FW (1992). Order of Battle of Divisions Part 5A. The Divisions of Australia, Canada and New Zealand and those in East Africa. Newport: Ray Westlake Military Books. ISBN 1-871167-25-6.
- Perry, FW (1993). Order of Battle of Divisions Part 5B. Indian Army Divisions. Newport: Ray Westlake Military Books. ISBN 1-871167-23-X.
- Rinaldi, Richard A (2008). Order of Battle of the British Army 1914. Ravi Rikhye. ISBN 978-0-97760728-0.
- Col H.C.B. Rogers, The Mounted Troops of the British Army 1066–1945, London: Seeley Service, 1959.
- Arthur Sleigh, The Royal Militia and Yeomanry Cavalry Army List, April 1850, London: British Army Despatch Press, 1850/Uckfield: Naval and Military Press, 1991, ISBN 978-1-84342-410-9.
- Taylor, Arthur (1972). Discovering Military Traditions. Aylesbury: Shire Publications Ltd. ISBN 0-85-263171-5.
- War Office, A List of the Officers of the Militia, the Gentlemen & Yeomanry Cavalry, and Volunteer Infantry of the United Kingdom, 11th Edn, London: War Office, 14 October 1805/Uckfield: Naval and Military Press, 2005, ISBN 978-1-84574-207-2.
- War Office, Titles and Designations of Formations and Units of the Territorial Army, London: War Office, 7 November 1927 (RA sections also summarised in Litchfield, Appendix IV).
- Westlake, Ray (1992). British Territorial Units 1914–18. Osprey Publishing. ISBN 978-1-85532-168-7.
- Westlake, Ray (1996). British Regiments at Gallipoli. Barnsley: Leo Cooper. ISBN 0-85052-511-X.
- Steve White, Strike Home: The Royal Bucks Yeomanry 1794–1967, Leicester?: Steve White, 1992, ISBN 0-95193810-X.
- Order of Battle of the British Armies in France, November 11th, 1918. France: General Staff, GHQ. 1918.
