= DCSA =

DCSA can refer to:

- Defense Counterintelligence and Security Agency, a US security agency
- Defence Communication Services Agency, a former UK military agency
