= Land Information and Communications Services Group =

LICSG is now the reserve element of a regular Royal Signals unit 15th Signal Regiment (Information Support) and as of 1 May 2014 became 254 Signal Squadron.

The Land Information and Communications Services Group (LICSG) of the British Army was one of the four Territorial Army (TA) units which constituted Central Volunteer Headquarters Royal Signals (CVHQ), the others being 81 Signal Squadron (Volunteers), the Land Information Assurance Group (LIAG) and the Full Time Reserve Service. Members of CVHQ are considered to be subject matter experts (SMEs) with current commercial and military skills and experience in either information assurance (IA) or information and communications services (ICS). It is a Royal Signals cap-badged unit and has members who have served with the Royal Navy; Army units: Royal Artillery, Royal Engineers, Royal Signals, Royal Electrical & Mechanical Engineers, Infantry units and the Royal Logistics Corps together with the Royal Air Force.

The LICSG provided critical national infrastructure (CNI) support in line with both the National Cyber Security Strategy and ISO/IEC 27001 (a compliance standard for information security management), offering specialist expertise and advice at every stage of the development and management of ICS. Key functions which it can undertake include:

- Strategic, operational and requirements analysis
- Planning
- Solution design
- Programme and project implementation
- In-service support and advice
- Business continuity planning
- Service management (ITIL)
- Continuous improvement analysis

The LICSG helped bring about the following effects for a defence organization:

- Deployed HQs and staffs
- Campaign Signal regiments
- Permanent joint operating bases (PJOBs) overseas
- UK homeland MoD organisations
- The MoD Information Systems and Services (ISS) directorate
- The MoD Global Operational Security Control Centre (GOSCC)
- Defence lines of development (DLODs)
- Friendly nations
