= Boddington, Gloucestershire =

Coordinates: 51.92432°N 2.15555°W

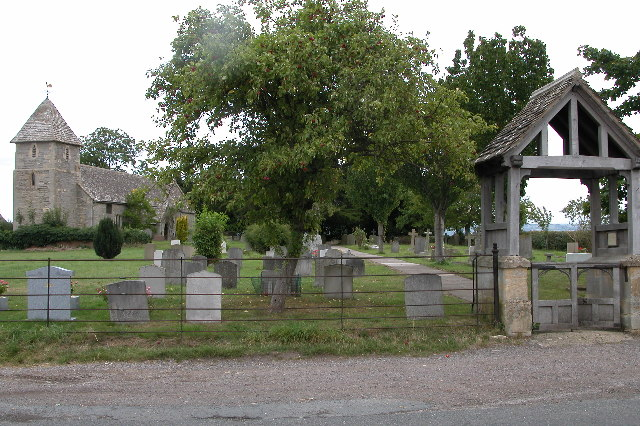
St Mary Magdelene Church, Boddington

Boddington is a village and parish near Cheltenham. The population taken at the 2011 census was 266. It is home to RAF Boddington.
