= Barrow, Gloucestershire =

Hamlet in Gloucestershire, England

Coordinates: 51.922°N 2.169°W

Barrow
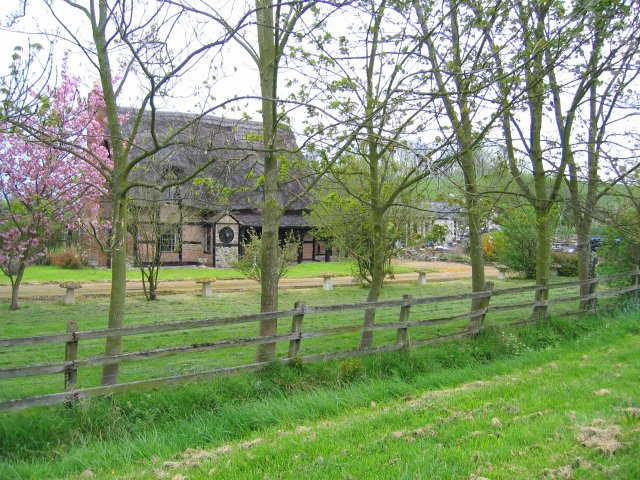
- Barrow Hill Farm

- Location within Gloucestershire
- OS grid reference: SO884248
- Shire county: Gloucestershire
- Region: South West
- Country: England
- Sovereign state: United Kingdom
- Post town: Cheltenham
- Postcode district: GL51
- Police: Gloucestershire
- Fire: Gloucestershire
- Ambulance: South Western
- UK Parliament: Tewkesbury

The Barrow is a hamlet in Gloucestershire, England.

ISS Boddington is within the hamlet.
