= 2 (City of Dundee) Signal Squadron =

Specialist communications unit of the British Army

2 (City of Dundee) Signal Squadron 92nd Signal Regiment 9th Special Communications Unit
- Cap Badge of the Royal Corps of Signals
- Active: 1947–present
- Country: United Kingdom
- Branch: British Army
- Type: Rear support communications unit
- Role: Signals Support
- Size: Squadron
- Part of: 32nd Signal Regiment
- Locations: Newman House, Dundee & Gordon Barracks, Aberdeen
- Nickname: City of Dundee Signals
- Corps: Royal Corps of Signals

Commanders
- Honorary Colonel: Susan Black, Baroness Black of Strome (2026)

Insignia
- Tactical Recognition Flash

- 32nd Signal Regiment Badge

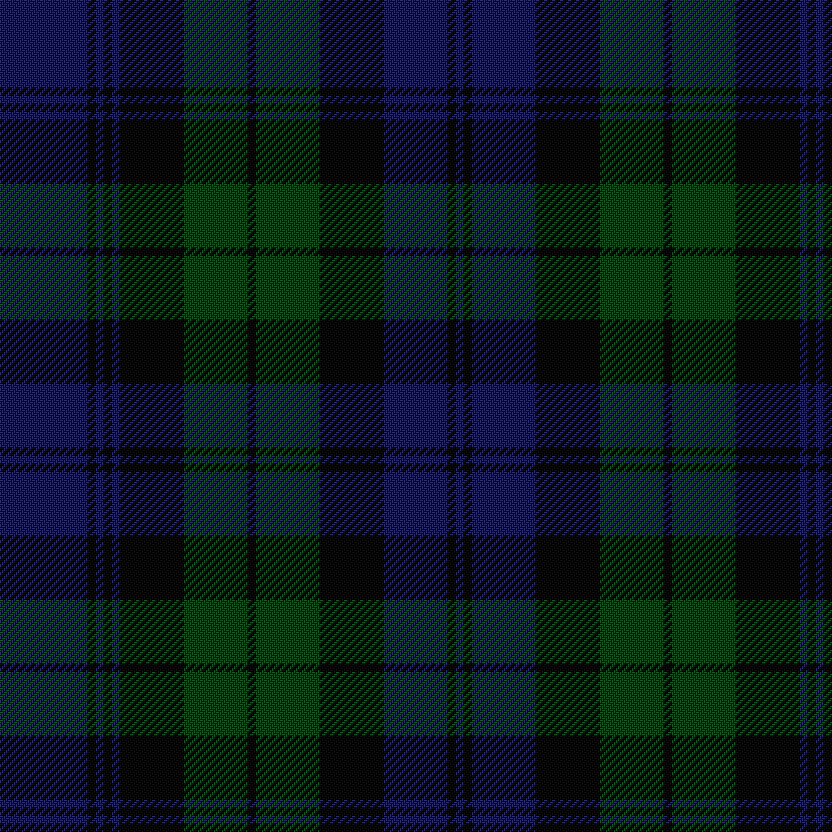
- Black Watch tartan

The 9th Special Communications Unit, later redesignated as the 92nd Signal Regiment, and from 1967 as 2 (City of Dundee) Signal Squadron is a communications unit of the British Army, belonging to the Royal Corps of Signals.

== Background ==
Following the reductions in 1922 known as the 'Geddes Axe', the British Army's Militia (known as the Special Reserve until 1924 when it became the Supplementary Reserve (SR)) was reduced into cadres and left in abeyance with some officers being placed on the Army List, but these units were not operational. In 1939, the units of the Supplementary Reserve for the infantry disappeared and were not activated in the Second World War, however the SR units for the Royal Corps of Signals (RCS) continued as special units, including wireless signal units and later new 'special communications units'.

In 1924, new SR units were formed for the Royal Corps of Signals to provide the corps with a number of specialist signal units, the most important being the General Headquarters (GHQ) Signals, Lines of Communications (LofC) Signals, and Air Formation Signals.

== Formation ==
=== SR/AER ===
In 1948, the Supplementary Reserve was recreated alongside the Territorial Army (TA) which was reformed the year before. That year, the 9th Special Communications Unit (SR) was formed in Forfar under local command of Scottish Command. In 1953, the Supplementary Reserve was renamed as the Army Emergency Reserve (AER) and the many company-sized signal units were expanded to battalion-size and became 'Signal Regiments'. The new regiments were allocated numbers ranging from 80 upwards from 1959. Therefore, in 1959 the unit became the 92nd Signal Regiment (Special Communications) (AER) still based in Forfar. In 1961, the regiment dropped its special communications suffix becoming the 92nd Signal Regiment (AER). Before 1969, the regiment and later squadron was based at the government radio station near Forfar.

=== TAVR ===
In 1967, as a result of the 1966 Defence White Paper, the Territorial Army (TA) was completely reorganised with many of the old units with long and distinguished histories reduced to company and platoon sizes and merged into new smaller units. Among the changes was the creation of the Territorial and Army Volunteer Reserve (TAVR), which was divided into three categories: TAVR I (The 'Ever-readies', ready for United Nations commitments and would serve to bring the Regular Army to war establishment, replace casualties, and be ready for rapid deployment); TAVR II (these units were to give the Regular Army administrative units not needed in peacetime. They would serve to bring the establishment and to replace losses. This category became known as the 'Volunteers' with units taking the sub-title of '(Volunteers) or (V)'. The third category, TAVR III was the largest of the branches tasked with home defence and were to maintain law and order in the event of nuclear attack and were also available for help in case of civil emergencies; these units had the subtitle of 'Territorial', not to be confused as the 'Territorials', the name for the TAVR as a whole. Lastly, TAVR IV was the smallest of the branch, comprising the University Officers' Training Corps, Regimental and Corps Bands and miscellaneous support units.

== Cold War ==
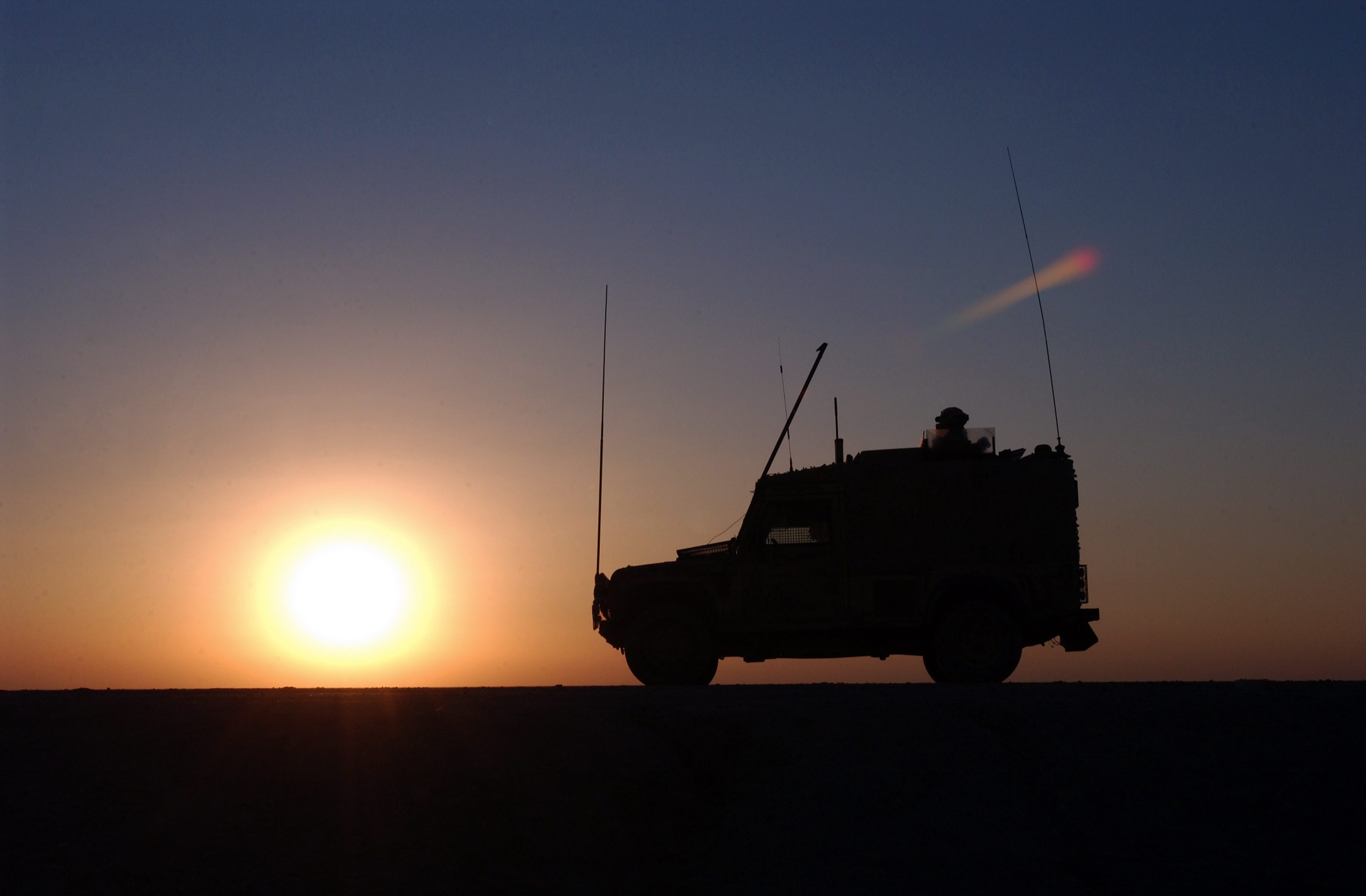
A Land Rover of the Royal Corps of Signals testing the new BOWMAN communications system in 2006. The BOWMAN is currently used by the squadron in addition the BGAN Inmarsat satellite communications system.

As a result of the reorganisation of the TA into the TAVR as noted above, the regiment became 2 Signal Squadron and joined the battalion-sized special communications unit: 39th (City of London) Signal Regiment. The regiment became a 'special communications unit', a role which the previous regiment had not maintained since 1961. Under the 2nd Signal Brigade, the regiment supported national communications. In 1969, the squadron moved to Dundee though retained its role and remained part of the regiment. This became the first official site of the unit, having previously only met for a 2-week annual camp in Forfar. The new site became the Strathmore Avenue TAVR Centre in Dundee.

On 1 April 1969, about 12 drivers and clerks of the Women's Royal Army Corps were transferred to the squadron from the 3rd (Territorial) Battalion, The Black Watch, part of TAVR III. After transfer of the WRAC to the Royal Corps of Signals, permission was granted by the Colonel-in-Chief of the Black Watch (HM Queen Elizabeth, The Queen Mother) for all female soldiers joining the squadron wear the Black Watch Tartan.

On 1 April 1988, the squadron moved to a new location, at the Mid Craigie Road TA Centre within the City of Dundee. This move was due to a change of role within 39th Signal Regiment, when the squadron was given the task of providing 'Top Relay Centre Bravo'. This task called for more real estate and the Highland TAVRA found and refurbished a former commercial depot. The new building was named Newman House after the Commanding Officer, the late Lieutenant Colonel D C Newman, who engineered the changes within the Regiment necessitated by the reorganisation of 1967.

== Post-Cold War ==
Following the end of the Cold War, the squadron was made independent on 1 April 1995 and placed under operational control of the 2nd (National Communications) Signal Brigade while remaining under administrative control of the 51st (Highland) Infantry Brigade, later 51st (Scottish) Brigade. In 1996, the squadron was redesignated as 2 (City of Dundee) Signal Squadron.

After becoming an independent unit, the squadron was tasked with providing secure high-frequency communications throughout the United Kingdom.

In 2012, under the Army 2020 programme, the independent territorial signal squadrons were brought back into signal regiments, with 2 Squadron becoming part of the 32nd (Scottish) Signal Regiment (later simply 32nd Signal Regiment). By 2015, the squadron absorbed 51 (Highland) Signal Squadron, and became 2 (City of Dundee & Highland) Signal Squadron. By this time, the squadron formed 851 (Highland) Signal Troop based in Aberdeen as a continuation of the former squadron.

Today, the squadron has its headquarters at Newman House on Mid Craigie Road in Dundee, while 851 (Highland) Signal Troop is the squadron airborne communications troop based at Gordon Barracks in the Bridge of Don, Aberdeen.

According to the British Army website, the squadron's role is described as follows:

Providing deployable real-time support to the Allied Rapid Reaction Force Headquarters (ARRC).

The squadron's current structure is as follows:

- Squadron Headquarters, at Newman House, Mid Craigie Road, Dundee
- Signal Troop, at Newman House, Mid Craigie Road, Dundee
- 851 (Highland) Airborne Communications Troop, at Gordon Barracks, Bridge of Don, Aberdeen
- 32 Signal Regiment is Headquartered at 21 Jardine Street, Glasgow with sub-unit locations in Edinburgh (51st Signal Squadron and 852 Signal Troop - East Kilbride), 52nd Support Squadron in Glasgow and 40 (Northern Irish Horse) Signal Squadron in Belfast.
- Recruitment. Contact email address and phone number for anyone interested in joining is through the Army Reserve Unit finder.
- Search Royal Signals - Dundee, Aberdeen, Edinburgh, East Kilbride, Belfast or Glasgow.
- #YouBelongHere #PaidToTrain

== Footnotes ==
- https://www.steppingforwardlondon.org/special-communications-units.html - role of special communications units
