= 61st (City of Edinburgh) Signal Regiment =

61st Signal Regiment was from 1939-67 a communications regiment of the British Army, part of the Royal Signals.

== 61st Signal Regiment ==
In 1939, orders were issued for 3rd Anti-Aircraft Divisional Signals TA to be raised in Edinburgh and Glasgow, as part of 3rd Anti-Aircraft Division, Anti-Aircraft Command, and in 1940-41 the unit was actively engaged against German air attacks on Great Britain. In 1940, the Glasgow Company was absorbed into the newly raised 12th AA Divisional Signals, and in 1941 the remainder was converted into a mixed unit. In 1942, AA Command was reorganised and the unit was amalgamated into 6th AA Group (Mixed) Signals, covering Scotland and North East England.

Following demobilisation in 1945, it was reformed in 1947 with two companies in Edinburgh and two in Glasgow. It was known as 13th AA (Mixed) Signal Regiment TA, part of 3rd Anti-Aircraft Group.

In 1955, when AA Command was abolished, the regiment was converted into Scottish Command (Mixed) Signal Regiment TA (part of Scottish Command). In 1957, it became 61st Signal Regiment TA. In 1962, it added "City of Edinburgh" to its title.

In the reorganisation of the Reserve Army in 1967, it became part of 32 (Scottish) Signal Regiment (Volunteers), with responsibility for the provision of mobile communications throughout Scotland in an emergency.
