= 10th Signal Regiment (United Kingdom) =

- Active: 1859–1987; 2002–Present
- Country: United Kingdom
- Branch: British Army
- Type: Military Communications
- Role: Information and Communication Services
- Size: Regiment; 574 personnel (2020)
- Part of: 1st Signal Brigade
- Garrison/HQ: MoD Corsham

Insignia
- Cap Badge

- Tactical Recognition Flash

10 Signal Regiment is a signal regiment of the Royal Corps of Signals within the British Army.

== History ==
The regiment can trace its history back to the Lanarkshire Engineer Volunteers formed in 1859. In 1908 the regiment was named as the Scottish Command Signals (Army Troops), Territorial Force, part of Scottish Command. Later, after World War II, the regiment became Headquarters British Army of the Rhine Signal Regiment. And was later renamed and re-organized to the 10th Army Group Signal Regiment.

As part of the Delivering Security in a Changing World changes the regiment was re-raised in 2002, as a support signals regiment headquartered at Basil Hill Barracks, Corsham. The regiment's main role was a "National Communications regiment", and was tasked with providing national communication signal duties. The British Army website said "the regiment provides day-to-day command and control ICS to Land Command throughout mainland GB, ICS reaction forces for major national incidents, including Homeland Security and specialist ICS support to expeditionary operations".

The regiment remained part of the 2nd Signal Brigade until 2012, when the Brigade became 2nd Signal Group.

As part of Army 2020 reforms, the regiment joined the 11th Signal Brigade.

After the Army 2020 reforms, the regiment now provides specialist capabilities across defense. This includes "defensive internet monitoring" and "technical surveillance counter measures", Information Communication Services (ICS) and Information Assurance (IA), communication services and specialist expertise in support of UK operations and Other Government Departments (OGDs), and secure communications in support of State Ceremonial events.

Under Future Soldier, the regiment joined the 1st Signal Brigade.

In July 2025 two soldiers from the regiment were court-martialed and dismissed for sharing helmet‑cam footage taken by Hamas during the October 7 attacks.

== Organisation ==
The current organisation of the regiment is (with roles):

- Regimental Headquarters, at MoD Corsham (former Basil Hill Barracks)
- 81 Signal Squadron (Army Reserve), at MoD Corsham
- 225 Signal Squadron, at Thiepval Barracks, Lisburn
- 241 Signal Squadron, at Saint George's Barracks, Bicester Garrison
- 243 Signal Squadron, at Marlborough Lines, Andover
- 251 Signal Squadron, at Duchess of Kent Barracks, Aldershot Garrison – held at Extremely High Readiness

== See also ==
- List of units of the British Army Territorial Force 1908 (Lanarkshire Engineers)
- Royal Corps of Signals
- 2nd Signal Brigade (United Kingdom)
- 11th Signal Brigade
