= Yeomanry House, Buckingham =

Building in Buckingham, England

Yeomanry House
- Buckingham
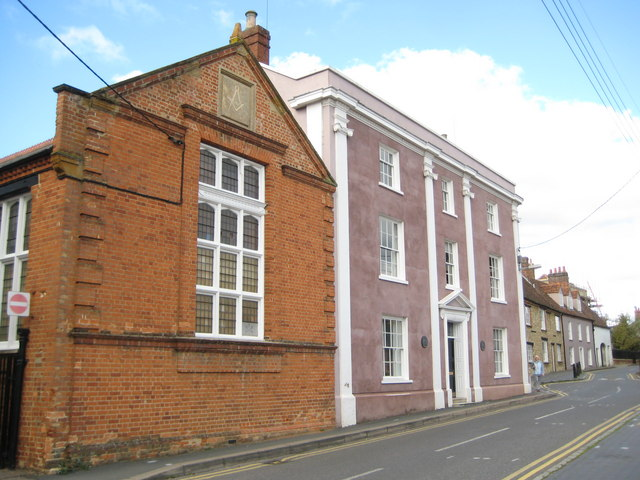
- Yeomanry House (on the right in dull pink render), adjoined by the Masonic Hall (on the left in red brick)

Site information
- Type: Military headquarters

Location
- Buckinghamshire
- Coordinates: 51.99607°N 0.99133°W

Site history
- Built: Early 19th century
- In use: Early 19th century-Present

Yeomanry House is a former military headquarters in Buckingham. It is a Grade II listed building.

== History ==
The building, which has a dull pink render, was built in the early 19th century as the offices and home of the commanding officer of the Buckinghamshire Yeomanry. The men of the regiment were accommodated at a depot and storehouse in West Street which was completed in 1802. The regiment was mobilised in Buckingham in August 1914 before being deployed to Gallipoli and, ultimately, to the Western Front.

After the First World War the regimental headquarters moved to Aylesbury and, by the 1960s, the Hunter Street area became very dilapidated. Yeomanry House was acquired by the University College at Buckingham in 1974 and, following extensive refurbishment work in the early 1980s, now serves as the main reception building and registered office of the University of Buckingham.
