= 32nd Signal Regiment (United Kingdom) =

- Emblem of 32nd Signal Regiment
- Active: 1967–present
- Country: United Kingdom
- Branch: British Army
- Size: Regiment of 386 personnel
- Part of: 1st (United Kingdom) Signal Brigade
- Regimental HQ: Glasgow
- Mottos: Certa Cito (“Swift and Sure”)
- Colors: Sky Blue, Navy and Green (Air, Sea and Land)
- March: Quick - Begone Dull Care; Slow - HRH (Princess Royal)
- Mascot: Mercury ("Jimmy")

Commanders
- Current commander: Lt Col Matt Johns MBE

Insignia
- Tactical Recognition Flash

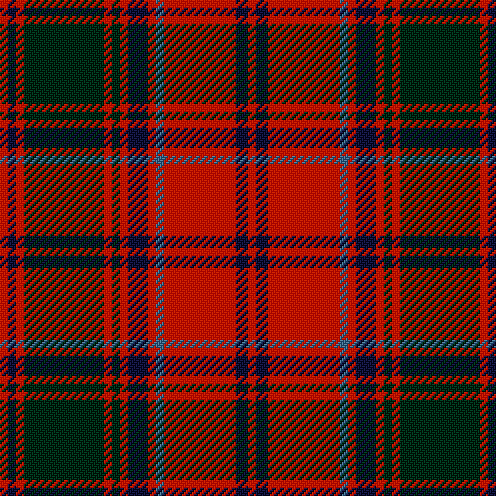
- Tartan (Red Grant, No. 15)

The 32nd Signal Regiment is a British Army Reserve regiment of the Royal Corps of Signals. The regiment forms part of 1st (United Kingdom) Signal Brigade, providing military communications for national operations.

== History ==
=== Early history ===
1st Lanarkshire Voluntary Military Engineers was raised in Glasgow on 5 December 1859 as part of the Volunteer Force. In 1894, the Telegraph Company, 2nd Lanarkshire Volunteer Military Engineers was assigned to the unit.

=== First World War ===
As part of the 1908 Haldane Reforms, the unit became the Lowland Divisional Telegraph Company. A Wireless, Cable and Airline unit was assigned to the unit and the regiment was established as a Field Company to support 51st (Highland) Division. After the outbreak of World War I in 1914, the regiment was sent as part of IV Corps and the British Expeditionary Force to France.

=== Second World War ===
During World War II, the regiment again saw active service, providing support to both 51st (Highland) Division and 52nd Lowland Divisions. In 1947, the regiment returned once again to Maryhill and was re-titled as the 51st/52nd (Scottish) Infantry Division Signal Regiment. It was further re-titled 52nd Lowland Infantry Division Signal Regiment in 1948.

=== Post-war ===
As a result of the 1966 Defence White Paper, the 32nd (Scottish) Signal Regiment was formed on 1 April 1967. The new regiment composed of five squadrons, amalgamating the four signals regiments in Scotland. They were as follows:

- Headquarters Squadron
- 51 (Highland) Signal Squadron - successor to 51st (Highland) Signal Regiment
- 52 (Lowland) Signal Squadron - successor to 52nd (Lowland) Signal Regiment
- 61 (City of Edinburgh) Signal Squadron - successor to 61st (City of Edinburgh) Signal Regiment
- 82 (Army Emergency Reserve) Signal Squadron - successor to 82nd Signal Regiment (Army Emergency Reserve)

The regiment gained a sixth squadron in 1969, whereby a squadron of North Irish Horse became 69 (North Irish Horse) Signal Squadron. From 2009 to 2014, 33 (Lancashire & Cheshire) Signal Squadron formed part of the regiment before it was transferred to 37th Signal Regiment under the Army 2020 reforms.

In October 2010, 69 (North Irish Horse) Signal Squadron returned to the regiment as 40 (North Irish Horse) Signal Squadron. Then under the Army 2020 re-organisation, 2 (City of Dundee and Highland) Signal Squadron was transferred from 38th (City of Sheffield) Signal Regiment.

== Structure ==
The regiment's current structure is as follows:

- Regimental Headquarters, in Glasgow
- 2 (City of Dundee and Highland) Signal Squadron, in Dundee
  - 851 (Highland) Signal Troop, at Gordon Barracks, Aberdeen
- 40 (North Irish Horse) Signal Squadron, in Belfast
  - 840 (Ulster) Signal Troop
- 51 (Scottish) Signal Squadron, in Edinburgh
  - 852 (Lowland) Signal Troop, in East Kilbride
- 52nd (Lowland) Support and Signal Squadron, in Glasgow

== See also ==
- Armed forces in Scotland
- Military history of Scotland

== Bibliography ==
- Lord, Chris; Watson, Graham (2004). The Royal Corps of Signals: Unit Histories of the Corps (1920-2001) and its Antecedents. Helion. ISBN 978-1874622925.
