= 37th Signal Regiment (United Kingdom) =

- Active: 1967–present
- Country: United Kingdom
- Branch: British Army
- Role: Military communications
- Part of: 1st (United Kingdom) Division
- Regimental HQ: Redditch

Commanders
- Honorary Colonel: Major General Stephen Potter

Insignia
- Royal Corps of Signals cap badge

- Tactical Recognition Flash

37th Signal Regiment (37 Sig Regt) is a military communications regiment of the Royal Corps of Signals, part of the British Army.

== History ==
The regiment was formed as the 37th (Wessex and Welsh) Signal Regiment, Royal Signals (Volunteers) in 1967. It initially consisted of 43 (Wessex) Signal Squadron, 53 (Welsh) Signal Squadron and 57 (City & County of Bristol) Signal Squadron. In 1969, 67 (Queen's Own Warwickshire and Worcestershire Yeomanry) Signal Squadron joined the regiment.

In 1992, under Options for Change, 43 (Wessex) Squadron transferred to 21st (Air Support) Signal Regiment, 57 (City and County of Bristol) Squadron transferred to 71 Signal Regiment and 93 (East Lancashire) Squadron transferred from 38 Signal Regiment. In addition to squadron changes, the regimental title was changed when the regiment dropped the 'Wessex and Welsh' subtitle following the above changes. Therefore, it became known as the 37th Signal Regiment.

In 2006, 93 (East Lancashire) Squadron transferred back to 38 Signal Regiment.

In 2009, under a further re-organisation, 67 (Queen's Own Warwickshire and Worcestershire Yeomanry) Squadron was reduced to a troop (867 Troop), and 48 (City of Birmingham) Squadron joined the regiment on the disbandment of 35 (South Midlands) Signal Regiment. At the same time, 33 (Lancashire) Squadron was formed on the disbandment of 33 (Lancashire and Cheshire) Signal Regiment.

In 2014, under Army 2020, 53 (Welsh) Signal Squadron transferred to 39 (Skinners) Signal Regiment.

== Structure ==
The current structure of the regiment is as follows.

- 37th Signal Regiment
  - Regimental Headquarters, in Redditch
    - The Royal Signals (Northern) Band, at Bradford Armoury, Darlington
  - 33 (Lancashire and Cheshire) Signal Squadron, in Liverpool
    - 842 (City of Manchester) Signal Troop, in Manchester
  - 48 (City of Birmingham) Signal Squadron, in Birmingham
    - 896 (City of Coventry) Signal Troop, in Coventry
    - 898 Signal Troop
    - 897 (Staffordshire) Signal Troop, at MOD Stafford, Stafford
  - 50 (Northern) Signal Squadron, in Darlington
    - 834 (Northern) Signal Troop
    - 875 (City of Durham) Signal Troop
    - Kohima Troop, at Imphal Barracks, York
  - 64 (City of Sheffield) Signal Squadron, in Sheffield
    - 849 (City of Leeds) Signal Troop, in Leeds
    - 864 (City of Sheffield) Signal Troop
    - 887 (City of Nottingham) Signal Troop, in Nottingham
  - 54 (Queen's Own Warwickshire and Worcestershire Yeomanry) Support Squadron, in Redditch
    - 867 (Capability Development) Signal Troop

== See also ==
- Units of the Royal Corps of Signals
