= Information Systems & Services =

Defence agency in the United Kingdom

Information Systems and Services

Organisation overview
- Formed: 1 April 2007
- Preceding Organisation: Defence Communication Services Agency
- Dissolved: 2019
- Superseding Organisation: Defence Digital
- Jurisdiction: Government of the United Kingdom
- Headquarters: MOD Corsham, Wiltshire
- Parent department: Ministry of Defence
- Parent Organisation: Strategic Command

Information Systems & Services (ISS) was a cluster within Strategic Command Top Level Budget of the United Kingdom Ministry of Defence. ISS was replaced by Defence Digital in 2019.

== History ==
ISS was created from the former Defence Communication Services Agency (DCSA) on 1 April 2007.

The organisation was spread across a number of sites, but in 2010 a £690 million programme was announced to unite ISS at MoD Corsham, Wiltshire in a modern office complex with 1,874 workspaces.

In 2019 ISS and a number of organisations were brought together as Defence Digital, with an annual budget of over £2 billion and about 2,400 staff including military, civil servants and contractors, led by Ministry of Defence chief information officer Charles Forte.

== Role ==
Information Systems & Services provided the procurement and support functions for integrated information and communication services across the Armed Forces, the Ministry of Defence and to overseas bases, operations and ships.
