= 1 (Royal Buckinghamshire Yeomanry) Signal Squadron =

1 (Royal Buckinghamshire Yeomany) Signal Squadron
- Cap Badge of the Royal Signals Regiment
- Active: (As Signals) 1995 - Present
- Country: United Kingdom
- Branch: Territorial Army
- Type: Royal Corps of Signals
- Role: Support Regular Army
- Size: 4 Troops
- Part of: 2 Signal Group; 11 Signal Brigade
- Garrison/HQ: SHQ - Bletchley; 899 (RBY) Signal Troop - Bletchley; 891 (Warwickshire) Signal Troop - Rugby; 805 (QOOH) Signal Troop - Banbury
- Mottos: Certa Cito ("Swift and Sure")
- Colors: Sky Blue, Navy and Green (Air, Sea and Land)
- March: Quick - Begone Dull Care; Slow - HRH (Princess Royal)
- Mascot: Mercury ("Jimmy")

Commanders
- R. Signals Colonel in Chief: The Princess Royal
- Honorary Colonel: Vacant
- Officer Commanding: Major S. Osei-Agyemang
- Squadron Sergeant Major: WO2 (SSM) M. Gott

Insignia
- Tactical Recognition Flash

1 (Royal Buckinghamshire Yeomanry) Signal Squadron was a British Territorial Army Squadron of the Royal Corps of Signals.

== History ==
The squadron was formed at Bletchley on 1 April 1995 from a detachment of 5 Squadron of 39 Signal Regiment and 602 Signal Troop, perpetuating the traditions of the Royal Buckinghamshire Yeomanry from 20 October 1996, a title that had been dormant since the disbandment of B Company, 2nd Battalion Wessex Volunteers a decade earlier. The squadron left 39 Signal Regiment to become an independent unit on 1 July 1999.

== Structure ==
The Squadron consisted of a Headquarters and three Signal troops:

- Squadron Headquarters – located at Bletchley
- 899 (Royal Buckinghamshire Yeomanry) Signal Troop – located at Bletchley
- 805 (Queen's Own Oxfordshire Hussars) Signal Troop – located at Banbury
- 891 (Warwickshire) Signal Troop – located at Rugby
