= 53 (Wales & Western) Signal Squadron =

- Active: 1908–present
- Allegiance: United Kingdom
- Branch: British Army
- Type: Combat Support
- Part of: 39th Signal Regiment
- Squadron HQ: Tŷ Llewellyn Army Reserve Centre, Cardiff

Commanders
- Current commander: Major Barry Harvey
- Honorary Colonel: John Davies

Insignia
- Cap Badge

- Tactical Recognition Flash

53 (Wales & Western) Signal Squadron is an Army Reserve squadron in the Royal Corps of Signals in the British Army. The only Reserve Royal Signals unit in Wales, it is based in Cardiff. "The Welsh Signallers" provide information and communication systems to the armed forces, emergency services and other government departments. Recently, the Squadron has been involved in support to the Olympic Games, covering strike action for essential services, security for the NATO Summit at the Celtic Manor and providing part of the flood relief efforts.

== Squadron history ==
As a result of the Volunteer Regulations of 1887, several officers of this Cardiff based unit gained certificates in signalling. This initial interest, which must have been increased by Guglielmo Marconi's first transmission from Lavernock on 11 May 1897 resulted in the formation of a telegraph company at Cardiff in 1908. It was the first TF telegraph company whose formation was recognised by the War Office. The unit had a strength of 44 officers and men.

The Welsh Divisional Signal Company arrived in Gallipoli in May 1915. Following the Allied evacuation of Gallipoli the signal company temporarily became XII Corps Signals at Salonika before restoration to its divisional role in Egypt in January 1916. The unit served in Palestine for the rest of the War. Its 2nd line – 68th Division Signal Company – remained in the UK for the duration of the War.

Apart from two years on internal security duties in Northern Ireland, 1940–1942, service in the Second World War was confined to operations in Europe from Normandy to the Baltic. The 53rd (Welsh) Infantry Division landed in Normandy on 28 June 1944 and fought as part of the 2nd Army for the rest of the conflict. During this period of operations, the divisional signals laid 7,347 miles of cable; and despatch riders covered 47,511 miles; telephone calls averaged 6,773 per week (40 per hour), and the switchboard operated for 5,952 hours without a break. During the whole course of the campaign the divisional net was only closed for 30 days. Again, as in World War 1, the 2nd line divisional signals, known as 38th (Welsh) Infantry Divisional Signals, remained in the UK. The division was at reduced readiness from December 1941, and became a reserve division in 1944.

In the British zone of occupation in Germany (1945–1947) the divisional signals evolved into 2nd Infantry Division Signals Regiment by 1947. Between 1947 and 1967, the Regiment increased in size to cover the whole of Wales.

In 1949, 95th AGRA (AA) Signal Squadron joined the Regiment as 2 Squadron. In 1950, 3 Squadron was raised at Wolverhampton, but it left the Regiment in 1957 to join Mid-West Signal Regiment. By 1956, the Regiment had also absorbed the WRAC elements of 603 HAA Regiment RA, and 887 Locating Battery RA. In the 1961 reorganisation of the Regiment took over 2 Squadron, 58 Signal Regiment at Wrexham, and assumed administrative responsibility for 343, 344 and 345 Brigade Signal Squadrons, 344 at Newport and 345 at Swansea.

A reduction to Squadron size took effect from 1967 when it became part of 37 Signal Regiment and had a detachment at Brecon from then until 2010 (TBC). The Squadron occupied premises at Park Street, Cardiff from 1912 until 1997 when the construction of the Millennium Stadium brought about a move to Tŷ Llewellyn Army Reserve Centre on Morgan Street where they have been based to this day.

The Squadron now comprises:

- 832 Signal Troop
- 833 Signal Troop
- Whiskey Signal Troop based in Gloucester

== Operations ==
Members of the Squadron have deployed in support of Operations both in the UK and Overseas including:

Operation	Country	Year
Battle of Gallipoli	Ottoman Empire	1915
First Battle of Gaza	Ottoman Empire	1917
Battle of Beersheba (1917)	Ottoman Empire	1917
Battle of Mughar Ridge	Ottoman Empire	1917
Battle of Jerusalem (1917)	Ottoman Empire	1917
Battle of Megiddo (1918)	Ottoman Empire	1918
Battle of Normandy	France	1944
Battle of Falaise	France	1944
Battle of the Bulge	France	1944–5
Op VARSITY	Germany	1945
Op PLUNDER	Germany	1945
Op TELIC 1–13	Iraq	2003–9
Op HERRICK 4–20	Afghanistan	2006–14
Op RESCRIPT	United Kingdom	2020
