= Cyber & Specialist Operations Command =

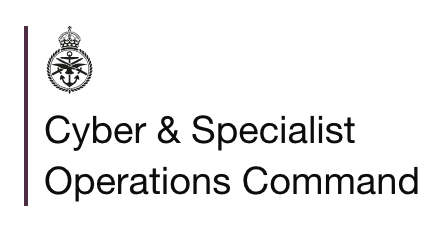
- Logo of Cyber & Specialist Operations Command
- Active: September 2025 – present (as Cyber & Specialist Operations Command); December 2019 – August 2025 (as Strategic Command); April 2012 – December 2019 (as Joint Forces Command)
- Country: United Kingdom
- Branch: Royal Navy; British Army; Royal Air Force
- Type: Joint Command
- Part of: Ministry of Defence
- Headquarters: Northwood Headquarters, Hertfordshire
- Website: www.gov.uk/government/organisations/cyber-and-specialist-operations-command

Commanders
- Commander: General Sir Rob Magowan
- Deputy Commander: Air Marshal Suraya Marshall

The United Kingdom's Cyber & Specialist Operations Command (CSOC), previously known as Strategic Command (StratCom) and Joint Forces Command (JFC), manages allocated joint capabilities from the three armed services.

== History ==
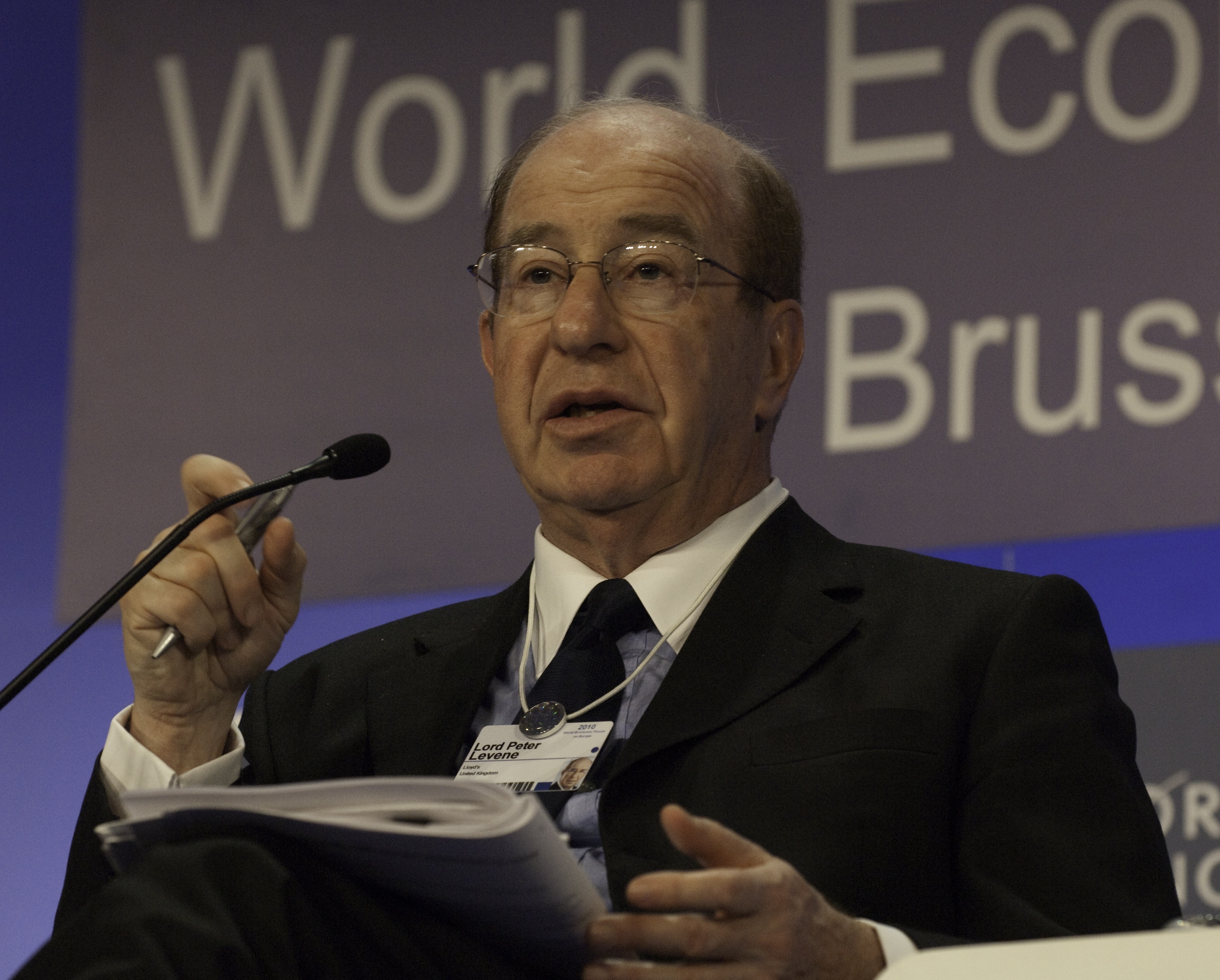
Lord Levene, Chairperson of the Defence Reform Steering Group

=== Background ===
In August 2010 the then Defence Secretary, Liam Fox, asked Lord Levene, a former Chief of Defence Procurement, to chair the Defence Reform Steering Group. The group's remit was to independently review defence and the structure and management of the Ministry of Defence. The group reported in June 2011, with a key recommendation being that a Joint Forces Command (JFC) should be created to manage and deliver specific joint capabilities and to take the lead on joint warfare development, learning from lessons and experimentation to advise on how the military should conduct joint operations in the future. The Defence Reform report also made the following recommendations:

- Joint Forces Command should be led by a military four-star ranking officer who would have responsibility for commanding and generating the joint capabilities allocated to the command and setting the framework for joint enablers that sit in the single services.
- A number of military organisations currently managed centrally within the MOD should pass to Joint Forces Command, including the Directorate Special Forces, the Defence Academy and the Development Concepts and Doctrine Centre.
- The Permanent Joint Headquarters (PJHQ) should sit within the Joint Forces Command, but report for operational purposes directly to the Chief of the Defence Staff.
- In implementing Joint Forces Command, the MOD should review in detail joint or potentially joint capabilities and functions across the armed services (Royal Navy, Army and Royal Air Force), to determine which could be rationalised, the benefit of further joint organisations, which organisations should transfer to Joint Forces Command and which should transfer to a lead service.

=== Establishment as Joint Forces Command ===
The creation of Joint Forces Command was overseen by the then Vice Chief of the Defence Staff, General Sir Nicholas Houghton, Air Chief Marshal Sir Stuart Peach, and the Defence Reform Unit, alongside the wider implementation of the new defence operating model identified by the report on Defence Reform. ACM Peach was appointed as the first commander of the Joint Forces Command on 15 September 2011, taking up the post on 1 December 2011.

Initial Operating Capability was achieved in April 2012 and Full Operating Capability was reached in April 2013, giving JFC a total of some 30,000 military and civil personnel.

=== Change to Strategic Command ===
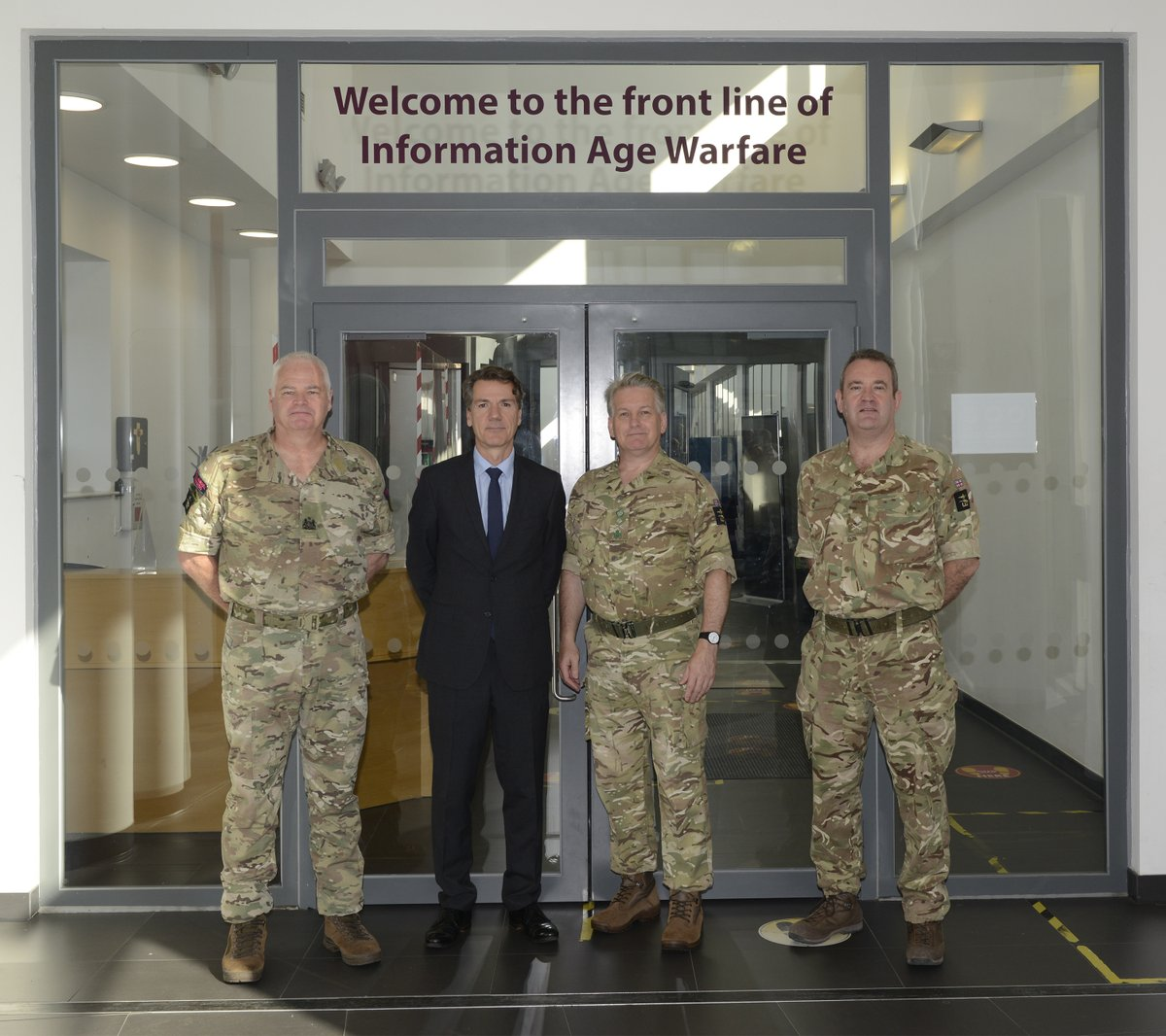
Visit by Commander Strategic Command, Sir James Hockenhull, to Defence Digital in 2022

The Secretary of State for Defence, Penny Mordaunt, announced in July 2019 that Joint Forces Command would be renamed as 'Strategic Command', dealing with the Ministry of Defence's transformation programme and taking responsibility for a range of strategic and defence-wide capabilities. Strategic Command will integrate fighting across Air, Land, Sea, Cyber and Space and ensure the armed services operate at the forefront of the information environment.

On 9 December 2019, it was announced that Joint Forces Command was renamed Strategic Command.

Joint Force Command and Strategic Command handled a number of space functions. Strategic Command had been responsible for satellite communications, intelligence, surveillance and reconnaissance (ISR) and positioning, navigation and timing (PNT), and the RAF for ballistic missile defence, space control and space domain awareness. However, United Kingdom Space Command was established on 1 April 2021 at RAF High Wycombe, and now works with the Space Directorate in London.

=== Change to Cyber & Specialist Operations Command ===
It was announced on 1 September 2025 that Strategic Command would be reorganised into Cyber & Specialist Operations Command. The Commander, Cyber & Specialist Operations Command, based at Northwood Headquarters, brings coherence to the delivery of joint effect by managing, delivering and advancing joint capabilities to support the success of military operations. He is supported by a deputy commander. Under Deputy Commander comes Chief of Staff, Director Strategy and Director Capability, of whom all are key members of the Command Group.

== Organisations and components ==
Strategic Command comprised the following organisations and components.

=== Directorate of Overseas Bases ===
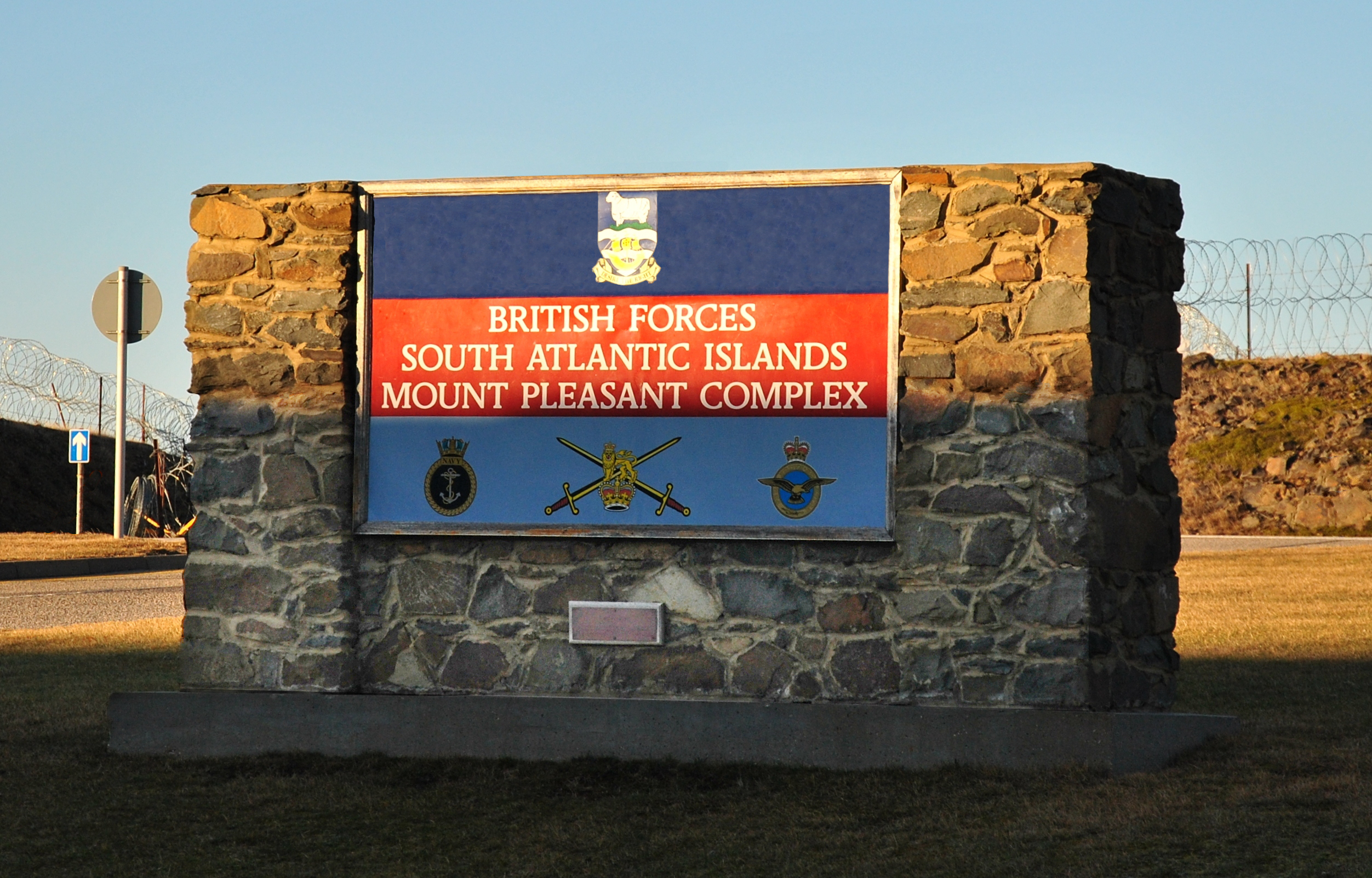
RAF Mount Pleasant in the Falkland Islands

The Director Overseas Bases is responsible for the UK's Overseas Bases, Support Units, the Global Support Organisation, and the UK's contribution to Arms Control and Verification on behalf of the Ministry of Defence.

- British Forces Cyprus – Sovereign Base Areas of Akrotiri and Dhekelia.
- British Forces South Atlantic Islands – Falkland Islands and South Georgia and the South Sandwich Islands
- British Forces Gibraltar – Gibraltar
- British Indian Ocean Territory – Diego Garcia
- British Defence Singapore Support Unit – Singapore

=== Directorate of Special Forces ===
The Director Special Forces (DSF) commands UK Special Forces (UKSF), which are capable of conducting short-notice high-risk operations in challenging environments around the world. The UK's special forces comprise the Special Boat Service, the Special Air Service, the Special Reconnaissance Regiment, the Special Forces Support Group, 18 (UKSF) Signal Regiment, and the Joint Special Forces Aviation Wing.

=== Defence Intelligence ===
The Chief of Defence Intelligence (DI) is the principal adviser on strategic military intelligence issues. DI primarily provides intelligence and advice to inform policy, deployment and research decisions, working alongside other government departments, agencies, allies, the EU and NATO. CDI is supported by a civilian deputy and a Director Cyber Intelligence and Information Integration. The following groups are the main components of DI:

==== Joint Forces Cyber Group ====
Originally named the Defence Cyber Operations Group, the Joint Forces Cyber Group (JFCyG) was created in May 2013 and plans and co-ordinates UK cyber warfare operations. It commands Joint Cyber Units at GCHQ Cheltenham and MOD Corsham, the Joint Cyber Unit (Reserve) and Information Assurance Units.

The Joint Cyber Unit (Reserve) was established in response to a growing cyber warfare threat and to allow the military to benefit from the expertise of civilian IT specialists. Capabilities include offensive cyber operations. The following units contribute personnel to the cyber reserve.

- Royal Navy Reserve – Reserve Cyber Unit
- British Army Reserve – Land Information Assurance Group
  - Specialist Group Information Services, previously 254 (SGIS) Signal Squadron
- Royal Auxiliary Air Force – No. 600 (City of London) Squadron
- Royal Auxiliary Air Force – No. 614 (County of Glamorgan) Squadron

==== Joint Intelligence Training Group ====
The Joint Intelligence Training Group is based at Chicksands in Bedfordshire and provides the British military with intelligence, security, languages and photography training.

=== Defence Medical Command ===
The military and civilian medical and dental personnel from all three British military services, are together known as the Defence Medical Services (DMS). Defence Medical Command is commanded by the Chief of Defence Medical from headquarters at DMS Whittington in Staffordshire. Defence Medical Command has three directorates: Defence Healthcare, Medical Personnel and Training and the Surgeon General's Directorate.

=== Directorate of Joint Capability ===
The Director of Capability is responsible for delivering a joint capability strategy, including in areas such as special forces; military counter-terrorism, explosive ordnance disposal, CBRN and Command, Control, Communications, Computers, Intelligence, Surveillance and Reconnaissance (C4ISR).

Based at RAF Halton in Buckinghamshire, the Joint Information Activities Group (JIAG) is a deployable team of information, media, technical communications and intelligence specialists.

=== Directorate of Resources and Policy ===
The Director of Resources and Policy provides top level budgeting, acts as Senior Finance Officer, Senior Policy Advisor and senior civilian workforce advisor for Joint Forces Command, and is personally responsible for the specific delegations from Director General Finance. Director of Resources and Policy is a member of Strategic Command's Command Group.

=== Directorate Defence Logistics and Support ===
The Chief of Defence Logistics and Support is a three-star officer who oversees various appointments such as Director Defence Support Transformation, Assistant Chief of the Defence Staff (Support Operations) and Director Joint Support.

=== Defence Digital ===
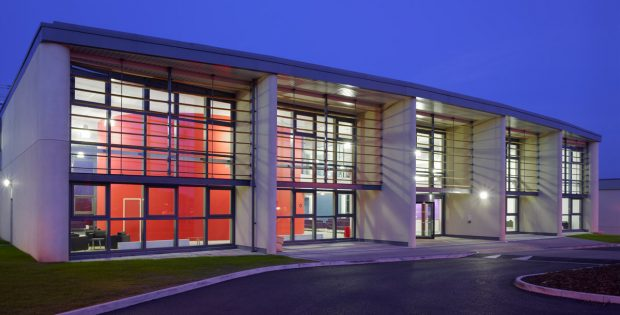
Defence Digital Operations Headquarters at MOD Corsham, Wiltshire

The MOD's Defence Digital organisation is led by Ministry of Defence chief information officer (CIO) Charles Forte, who is responsible for information strategy and policy across the MOD and also the delivery of information technology systems across the MOD's corporate and military elements. Defence Digital was created in 2019 when Information Systems & Services and a number of organisations were brought together; at that time it had an annual budget of over £2 billion and about 2,400 staff including military, civil servants and contractors. Under CIO comes the following: Director Military Digitalisation, Director Digital Enablement, Director Functional Integration, Chief Data Officer, Director Defensive Cyber and Risk, Executive Director Service Delivery and Operations, Director Operations, Director Delivery Intelligence and Expeditionary Service and Director Core Information Services.

Defence Digital activity is largely at MOD Corsham in Wiltshire, and it has a presence at other sites including:

- Blandford Camp, an Army facility in Dorset, home to the Royal Corps of Signals.
- MOD Boddington, a former non-flying RAF station in Gloucestershire.
- RAF Henlow in Bedfordshire, home to parts of Communication and Information Systems Branch and Operations Support Branch.

=== Joint Force Development ===
Joint Force Development plans and develops the current and future Joint Force and leads capability for concepts and doctrine, education and training, Defence-wide exercises, experimentation, analysis and lessons. The following groups are the main components of Joint Force Development:

==== Defence Academy of the United Kingdom ====
Based at MOD Shrivenham in Oxfordshire, the Defence Academy provides higher education for personnel in the British Armed Forces, the Civil Service, other government departments and service personnel from other nations. The Defence Centre of Training Support, originally headquartered at RAF Halton, forms part of the Defence Academy and is responsible for training military instructors and managers, and other aspects of defence training.

==== Royal College Defence Studies ====
The Royal College of Defence Studies The Royal College of Defence Studies (RCDS) instructs the most promising senior officers of the British Armed Forces.

==== Directorate of Joint Warfare ====
The role of the Director of Joint Warfare is to enable joint forces to operate effectively by defining, measuring and validating the joint force capabilities and formations required to meet current, unexpected and emerging threats. The directorate is responsible for the development and maintenance of air–land and air–maritime integration, and support to associated initiatives.

==== Standing Joint Force Headquarters ====
The Standing Joint Force Headquarters (SJFHQ) is a rapidly deployable component. When deployed, SJFHQ is responsible to Chief of Joint Operations through the Chief of Staff (Operations), otherwise the component reports to the Director of Joint Force Development. The Joint Force Headquarters and Joint Force Logistics Component Headquarters come under the command of the SJFHQ Commander and are based at Northwood Headquarters.

==== Defence Futures and Force Design ====
The Defence Futures and Force Design (DFFD) is the MOD's think tank and is responsible for research work in support of joint concepts and doctrine, as well as those relating to the Royal Navy, Royal Air Force and British Army.

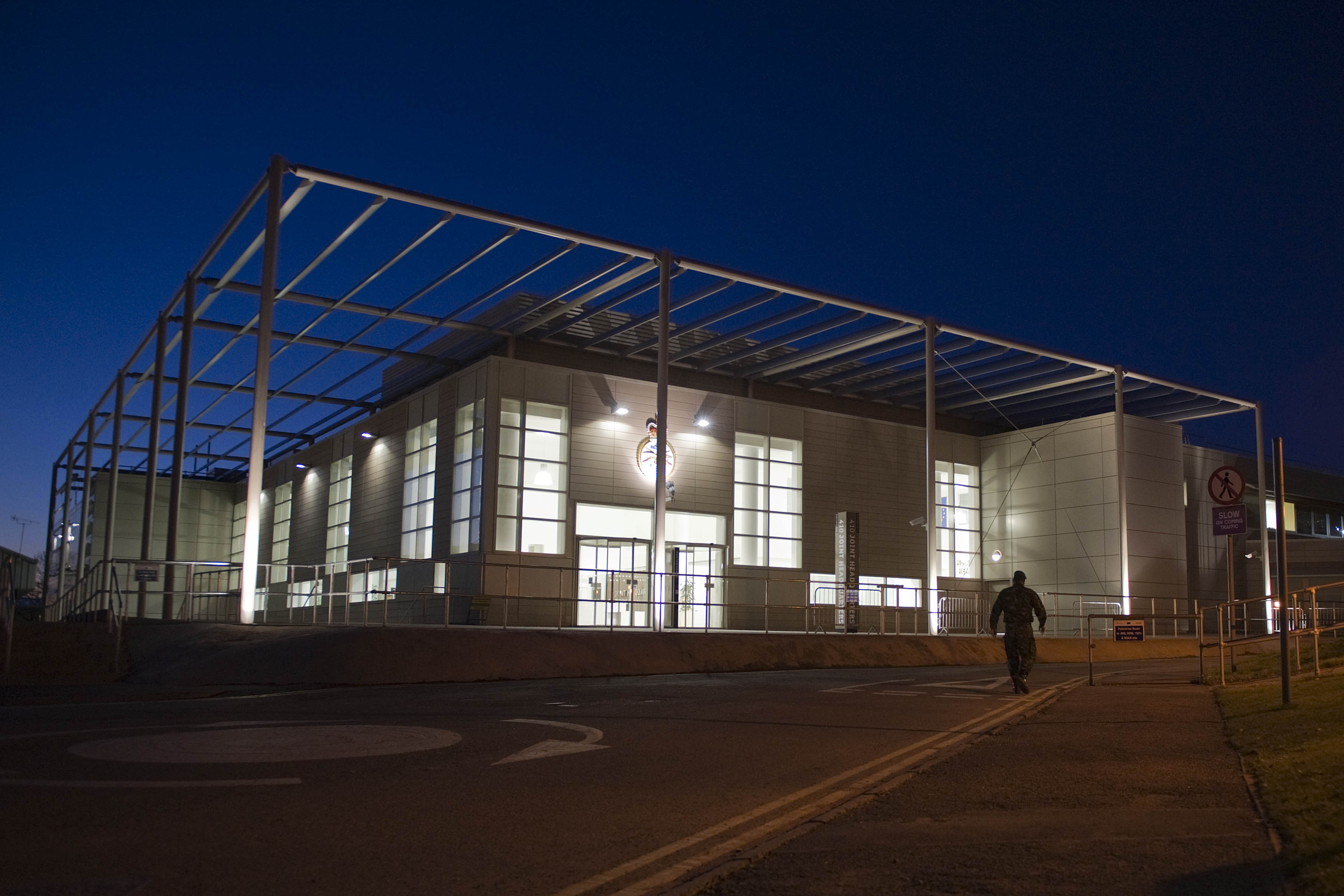
The Permanent Joint Headquarters at Northwood, Hertfordshire

=== Joint Operations ===
The Chief of Joint Operations (CJO) provides operational command of UK forces assigned to overseas joint and combined operations and provides politically aware military advice to the MOD in order to achieve UK's strategic objectives on operations. CJO includes the Permanent Joint Headquarters at Northwood Headquarters in Hertfordshire. He is supported by a Chief of Staff (Operations) and a civilian Chief of Staff (Policy and Finance).

=== Joint Arms Control Implementation Group ===
The Joint Arms Control Implementation Group (JACIG) is the UK's arms control verification agency which is based at RAF Henlow in Bedfordshire. JACIG's work is focussed on implementing three main treaties: the Conventional Armed Forces in Europe (CFE) Treaty, the Vienna Document and the Open Skies Treaty.

=== Joint Counter-Terrorism Training and Advisory Team ===
The Joint Counter-Terrorism Training and Advisory Team (JCTTAT) is based at Risborough Barracks in Kent.

== Commanders ==
A list of those who have served as Commander Joint Forces Command (retitled Commander of Strategic Command on 9 December 2019 and Commander Cyber & Specialist Operations Command on 1 September 2025):

No.	Portrait	Commander	Took office	Left office	Time in office	Defence branch	Ref.
1	Sir Stuart Peach	Air Chief Marshal; Sir Stuart Peach (born 1956)	December 2011	April 2013	1 year, 4 months	Royal Air Force	
2	Sir Richard Barrons	General; Sir Richard Barrons (born 1959)	April 2013	April 2016	3 years	British Army	
3	Sir Christopher Deverell	General; Sir Christopher Deverell	April 2016	May 2019	3 years, 1 month	British Army	
4	Sir Patrick Sanders	General; Sir Patrick Sanders (born 1966)	May 2019	May 2022	3 years	British Army	
5	Sir James Hockenhull	General; Sir James Hockenhull (born 1964)	May 2022	March 2026	4 years, 5 months	British Army	
6	Sir Rob Magowan	General; Sir Rob Magowan (born 1967)	March 2026	Incumbent	7 months	Royal Marines	
