= 38th (City of Sheffield) Signal Regiment =

The 38 Signal Regiment (Volunteers) was a regiment of the British Army's Royal Corps of Signals, part of the Army Reserve. The regiment's task was to "provide contingency communications throughout the whole of Northern England, from the Scottish Borders to the Northern Home Counties. In this role it provided direct support to 15th (North East) Brigade, the Preston-based 42nd (North West) Brigade and the Nottingham-based 49th (East) Brigade." The regiment formed part of 2 (National Communications) Signal Brigade.

== History ==
The regiment was formed as part of 13th Signal Group on 1 April 1967, from an amalgamation of three existing units; 46th (North Midland) Signal Regiment TA based in Derby, 64th Signal Regiment TA based in Sheffield and 337th Brigade Signal Squadron based in Nottingham. The headquarters of the new regiment, together with Headquarters Squadron and 64th Signal Squadron, were initially established in ad hoc accommodation in Sheffield before being eventually re-housed in purpose built premises at Manor Top in 1980. The Princess Royal, Colonel in Chief of the Royal Corps of Signals, visited the regiment in the same year. Existing TA Centres in Nottingham and Derby were used to house 87th Signal Squadron and 46th Signal Squadron respectively; the latter squadron also included a detached troop in Leicester.

In 2009, the regiment comprised four squadrons:

- Headquarters Squadron (at Sheffield)
- 46 (City of Derby) Signal Squadron (Volunteers) (at Derby)
- 64 (City of Sheffield) Signal Squadron (Volunteers) (at Sheffield and Nottingham)
- 93 (East Lancashire) Signal Squadron (Volunteers) (at Blackburn and Manchester)

However, as a result of a defence review in 2009, with effect from 1 April 2010, 46 (City of Derby) Squadron and 93 (East Lancashire) Squadron were both disbanded, while 64 (City of Sheffield) Squadron gained an additional troop in Leeds.

In 2010, the regiment gained the following squadrons:

- 41 (Princess Louise of Kensington) Signal Squadron, based at Coulsdon with C Troop located at Kingston upon Thames.
- 1 (Royal Buckinghamshire Yeomanry) Signal Squadron, based at Bletchley, Rugby and Banbury.

In 2015 the regiment was disbanded and removed from the British Army's Order of Battle.
