= Defence Communication Services Agency =

Former executive agency in the UK

- DCSA logo

Agency overview
- Formed: 1 April 1998
- Dissolved: 31 March 2007
- Superseding agency: Information Systems & Services
- Type: Executive agency
- Status: Dissolved
- Headquarters: Basil Hill Barracks, Wiltshire, England
- Employees: 5,000
- Annual budget: £1.2 billion
- Parent department: Ministry of Defence
- Parent agency: Defence Logistics Organisation
- Website: Official website (archived)

The Defence Communication Services Agency (DCSA) was an agency of the United Kingdom Ministry of Defence responsible for the procurement and delivery of Communications and Information Services (CIS) to the defence community and related public and private sector bodies. The Agency was formed on 1 April 1998, bringing together a range of CIS organisations across all three services.

Formally a component of the Defence Logistics Organisation, the Agency brigaded together elements of the Defence Procurement Agency, the DLO and operational support elements within the three military Front Line Commands.

On 31 March 2007 the Agency was subsumed into Defence Equipment & Support, a new organisation bringing together the DPA and DLO, as the Information Systems & Services (ISS) cluster within that organisation.

== Organisation ==
The DCSA was formed of a core headquarters, led by a military Chief Executive at Two-star rank, supported by an Operations Directorate, Directorate of Engineering and Interoperability, and a number of Integrated Project Teams, responsible for the procurement and support of systems and services. The Agency was headquartered at Basil Hill Barracks, Corsham, Wiltshire, and had 5,000 staff at facilities in many locations in the UK and overseas.

DCSA Headquarters

- Directorate of Operations
  - Customer Account Management - Basil Hill Barracks, Corsham
  - Global Operations and Security Control Centre - Basil Hill Barracks, Corsham
- Defence High Frequency Service - Very Low, Low and High Frequency Radio Services - Headquartered at HMS Forest Moor and combining RN services with RAF services formerly headquartered at RAF Bampton Castle
- Directorate of Engineering & Interoperability - Headquartered at RAF Henlow and bringing together RAF, RN and Army technical engineering services.

=== Integrated Project Teams ===
==== Network Layer ====
- Defence Fixed Networks - Fixed and mobile telephony and core network services - Copenacre Site, Corsham
- Satellite Communications - MoD Abbey Wood
- HF Radio - MoD Abbey Wood

==== Presentation Layer ====
- Defence Information Infrastructure - Desktop services - Copenacre Site, Corsham
- Ground Based Air Defence -
- Air Command and Control

==== Application Layer ====
- Corporate and Business Applications
- Logistics Applications
- Command, Control and Intelligence Systems
- UK Cooperative Engagement Capability (naval air defence system)

== Formation ==
The founding CE was Major-General Tony Raper CB CBE, late Royal Signals. He was succeeded by Rear Admiral Rees Ward in 2002, who continued as CE until 2007 when the Agency was disestablished.
