= MOD Corsham =

Ministry of Defence site in Wiltshire, England

Ministry of Defence Corsham
- Near Corsham, Wiltshire in England
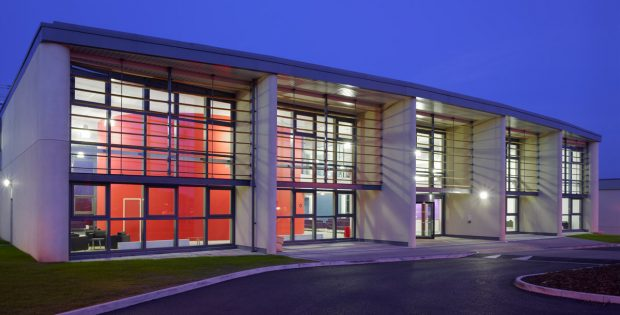
- Defence Digital Operations HQ, MOD Corsham

Site information
- Type: Military communications centre
- Owner: Ministry of Defence
- Operator: Strategic Command
- Controlled by: Defence Digital
- Condition: Operational

Location
- Location within Wiltshire
- Coordinates: 51°25′14.28″N 2°13′0.70″W

Site history
- Built: 1936
- In use: 1936-present

Garrison information
- Occupants: Global Operations Security Control Centre; Joint Cyber Unit (Corsham); Joint Security Co-ordination Centre; Land Information Assurance Group; 10th Signal Regiment; 600 Signal Troop

MOD Corsham (formerly Basil Hill Barracks) is a Ministry of Defence establishment located between the towns of Corsham and Box in Wiltshire, England. Since 1998 the site's principal activities concern British Armed Forces and MOD information and communications technology and information warfare.

== History ==
The War Office bought a section of the Pockeridge estate to provide space for Basil Hill Barracks in 1936. The barracks were used by 15 Company Royal Army Ordnance Corps as the administrative headquarters for a Central Ammunitions Depot serving the south of England, known as CAD Corsham or CAD Monkton Farleigh. The depot closed in 1964, although the site was retained by the Royal Army Ordnance Corps and was still used as the headquarters of their Territorial Army section in the 1980s.

The site had two significant older buildings. Pockeridge House, to the east of the site, has origins in the 18th century, with additions including coach houses, stables and a walled garden; it was used as the Officers' Mess. Sandhurst Block is a substantial two-storey office building which was built in 1938, reputedly in the style of a monastery to disguise the site's use.

From 1998, Corsham was the headquarters of the newly created Defence Communication Services Agency, taking over from the Navy, Army and RAF which had dealt with their own communications. The site was then sometimes called DCSA Corsham. In 2007 the DCSA was subsumed into Information Systems & Services (ISS) within Defence Equipment and Support.

In 2019 Information Systems & Services and a number of organisations were brought together as Defence Digital, with an annual budget of over £2 billion and about 2,400 staff including military, civil servants and contractors, led by the Ministry of Defence chief information officer Charles Forte.

== Today ==
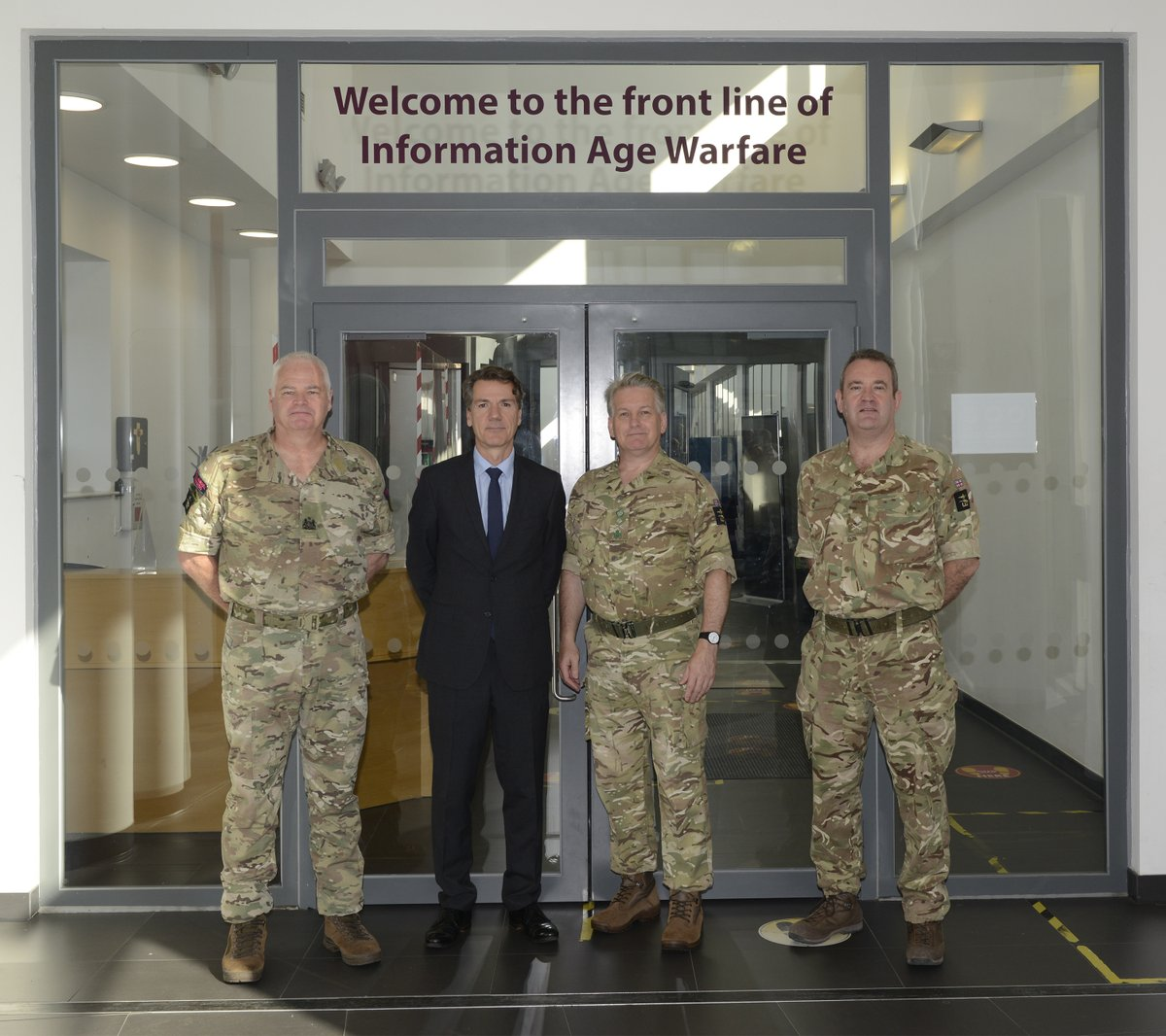
Visit by Commander Strategic Command to Defence Digital in 2022

Located on the former Basil Hill Barracks site, MOD Corsham is the product of a £690 million development project that was completed at the end of 2011. The site is home to the Ministry of Defence's Global Operations Security Control Centre (GOSCC), the Joint Security Co-ordination Centre (JSyCC), and Defence Digital. In 2012, GOSCC monitored and managed over 500,000 configurable IT assets in its "Operate and Defend" mission over MOD networks.

For the Army Reserve, the site has two multi-service units under JFC DD which recruit nationwide: the Land Information Assurance Group and a Joint Cyber Unit.

== Corsham New Environment programme ==
The Corsham New Environment programme was initiated in 2001, to modernise the three sites around MoD Corsham with their 118 old buildings and 350 acres (140 ha) of underground facilities. The programme was approved in 2004, business case approved in 2006, and a 25-year £690 million Private Finance Initiative (PFI) contract placed in 2008 with the Inteq Consortium, a joint-venture between John Laing and Interserve. Two sites – the manor itself at RAF Rudloe Manor north, and Copenacre – were sold and the more efficient new site required 370 fewer operational staff.

Construction began in 2010 and the first staff moved in in 2011. The new Global Operations and Security Control Centre (GOSCC) building was built over the capped large Queen Mary vent to the underground facilities below. New accommodation for 180 service personnel and a sports hall were also built. Remediation works were carried out to the underground facilities. About 2,200 personnel, including industry partners, were expected to work at the site.

The programme was part of the Defence Equipment and Support 'PACE' (Performance, Agility, Confidence and Efficiency) business improvement programme to consolidate many of its staff within the Bristol and Bath area around its major MoD Abbey Wood site.

The south-west of the site, both under and above ground, formerly part of RAF Rudloe Manor south, has been used to house data centres by Ark Data Centres and their joint partnership with the UK Government, Crown Hosting Data Centres.

== Other units ==
In addition to GOSCC, JSyCC and JFC DD, MOD Corsham is home to several more MoD units, among them 11th Signal Brigade's 10th Signal Regiment including its reserve unit 81 Signal Squadron; and 233 (Global Communication Networks) Signal Squadron (now part of the re-activated 13th Signal Regiment. The United Kingdom National Distribution Agency (UKNDA) and Electronic Messaging Service (email and secure dial-up) are also on the site. The site served as the headquarters of the British Army's 2nd (National Communications) Signal Brigade until it was disbanded in 2012.

In April 2016, a new Cyber Security Operations Centre (CSOC) "to protect the MOD's cyberspace from malicious actors" was announced at MOD Corsham, with a budget of over £40 million. The Operations Centre was to work alongside the planned civilian National Cyber Security Centre.

Airbus Defence and Space (previously Paradigm Secure Communications) have a base a few hundred metres north of the site to support the Skynet 5 private finance initiative satellite operations contract, in partnership with Defence Digital. The Corsham Computer Centre, a Royal Navy submarine support unit, is a few hundred metres north-east of MoD Corsham.

== Scheduled monuments ==
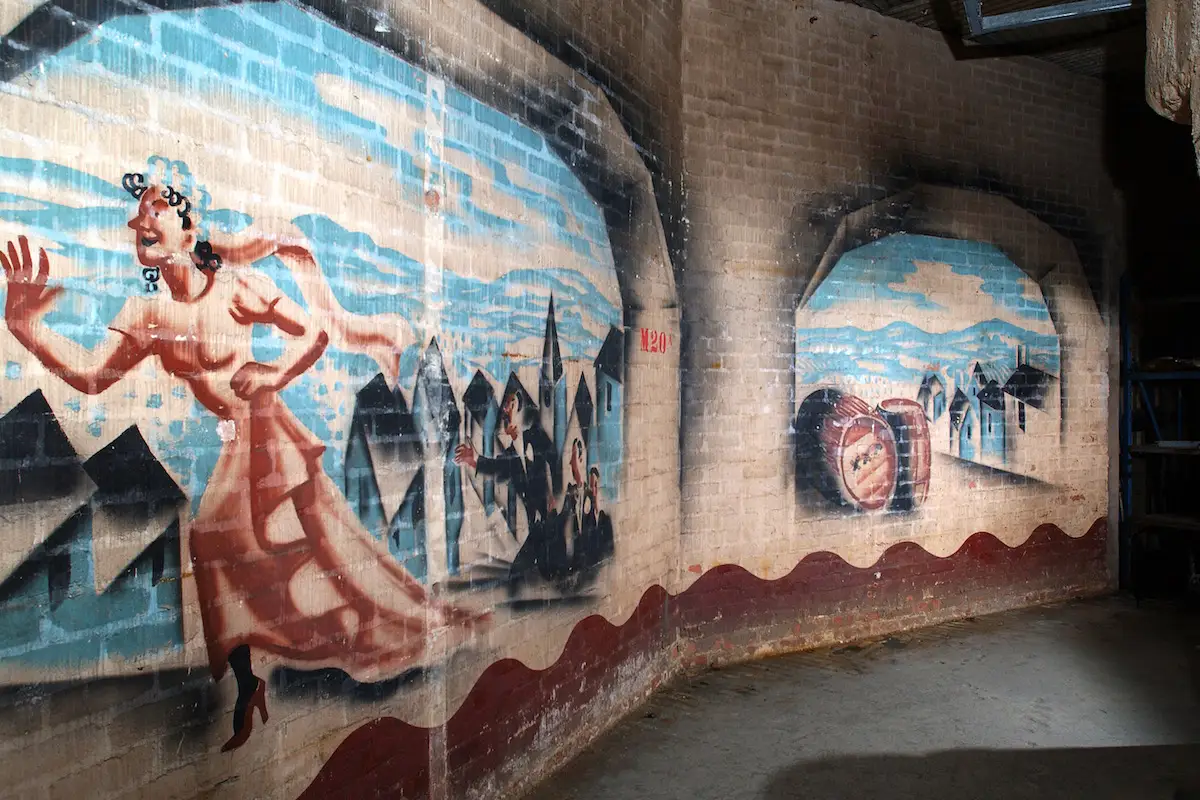
Canteen paintings circa 1943 by Olga Lehmann

A number of the underground facilities under MOD Corsham are scheduled monuments relating to Cold War history, including parts of the Central Government War Headquarters (CGWHQ). Additionally a number of underground murals painted by Olga Lehmann during World War II are Grade II* listed. East to west they are:

- Tunnel Quarry
- Slope Shaft (Emergency Exit) A
- Kitchen, Canteen, Laundry, Dining and Washroom Areas
- Prime Minister's Rooms and Operations Rooms
- Radio Studio
- GPO Telephone Exchange
- Lamson Terminus Room and associated Fan Room
- Quarry Operations Centre (QOC) Murals
