= 39th (Skinners) Signal Regiment =

- Cap badge of the Royal Corps of Signals
- Active: 1967 – present
- Country: United Kingdom
- Branch: British Army
- Type: Royal Corps of Signals
- Size: Regiment of 385 personnel
- Part of: 1st Signal Brigade
- RHQ location: Bristol
- Nickname: "The Skinners"
- Reporting designation: 39 Sig Reg

Commanders
- Honorary Colonel: Capt Edward Goodchild

Insignia
- Tactical Recognition Flash

39th (Skinners) Signal Regiment is an Army Reserve regiment in the Royal Corps of Signals in the British Army. The regiment forms part of 1 Signal Brigade, providing military communications for national operations. The Lynx badge is a reminder of the unit's connection with the Worshipful Company of Skinners.

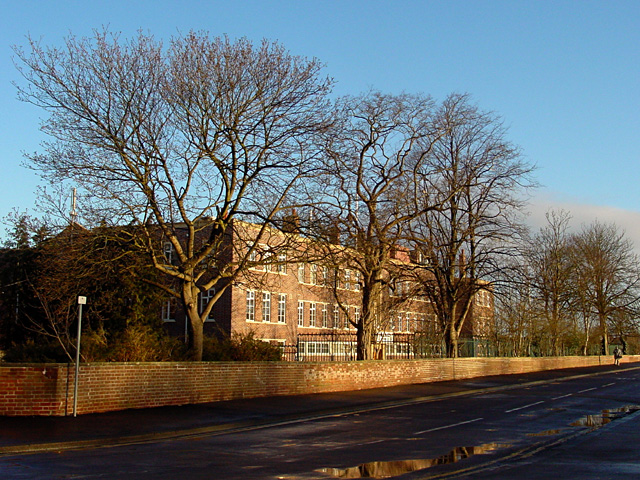
Regimental Headquarters in Horfield, Bristol

== History ==
The regiment was formed in 1967 by the amalgamation of 65th Signal Regiment and 92nd Signal Regiment, with some personnel from the disbanded Queen's Own Oxfordshire Hussars at Banbury. In 1969 the regiment absorbed part of R (Tower Hamlets) Battery from the disbanded Greater London Regiment, Royal Artillery.

In 1971 a new 5 (Banbury) Squadron was formed, which in 1975 became 5 (Queen's Own Oxfordshire Hussars) Signal Squadron.

47 (Middlesex Yeomanry) Signal Squadron at Uxbridge formed part of the regiment from 1995 to 2006, when it transferred to 71st (City of London) Yeomanry Signal Regiment.

In 2000, the North Somerset Yeomanry designation was revived for the Headquarters Squadron of 39th (Skinners) Signal Regiment and, in 2008, that squadron, as 93 (North Somerset Yeomanry) Squadron, became the Regiment's Support Squadron.

In 2006, 94 (Berkshire Yeomanry) Squadron transferred from 31st (City of London) Signal Regiment.

In 2014, under Army 2020, 43 (Wessex and City & County of Bristol) Signal Squadron transferred from 21st Signal Regiment and 53 (Welsh) Signal Squadron transferred from 37th Signal Regiment, while 5 (QOOH) Squadron transferred to the Royal Logistic Corps.

== Structure ==
The current structure of the regiment is as follows:

- Regimental Headquarters, in Bristol
- 43 (Wessex and City & County of Bristol) Signal Squadron, in Bath
  - 857 (City and County of Bristol) Signal Troop, in Bristol
- 53 (Wales and Western) Signal Squadron, in Cardiff
  - Western Signal Troop, in Gloucester
- 93 (North Somerset Yeomanry) Support Squadron, in Bristol
- 94 (Berkshire Yeomanry) Signal Squadron, in Windsor

== Honours ==
- Freedom of the City of Bristol in 2019.

== See also ==
- Units of the Royal Corps of Signals
