= Westfalen Garrison =

Major British garrison in Germany

Coordinates: 51.778°N 8.720°E

Location in North Rhine-Westphalia

Westfalen Garrison is a major British garrison with facilities located in Paderborn, Sennelager and Gütersloh in North Rhine-Westphalia, Germany which now forms the major part of British Forces Germany. It was the home of the 20th Armoured Brigade and most of its subordinate units. Headquarters Westfalen Garrison is based at Antwerp Barracks in Sennelager.

== History ==
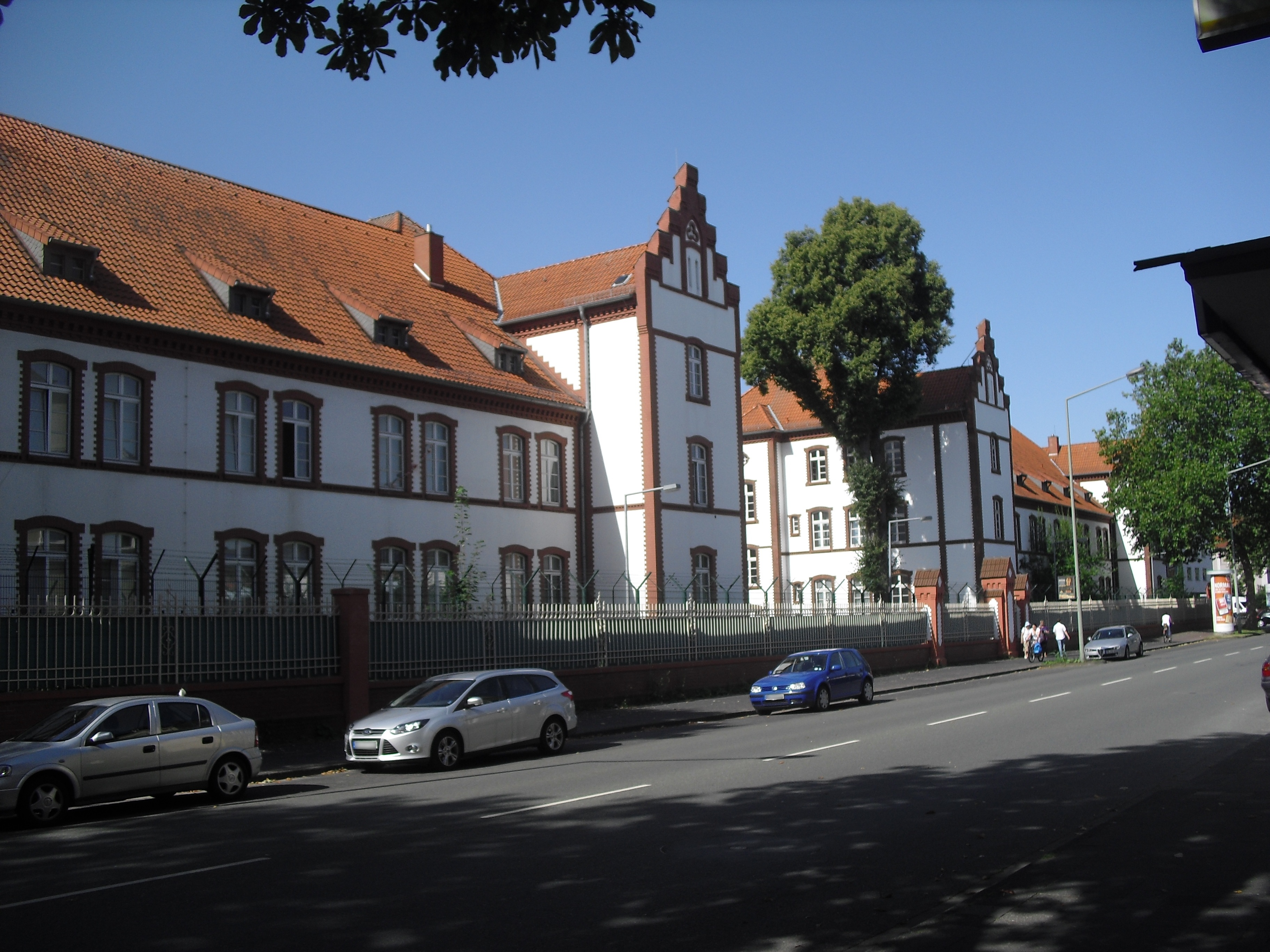
Alanbrooke Barracks (formerly the Infantrie Kaserne)

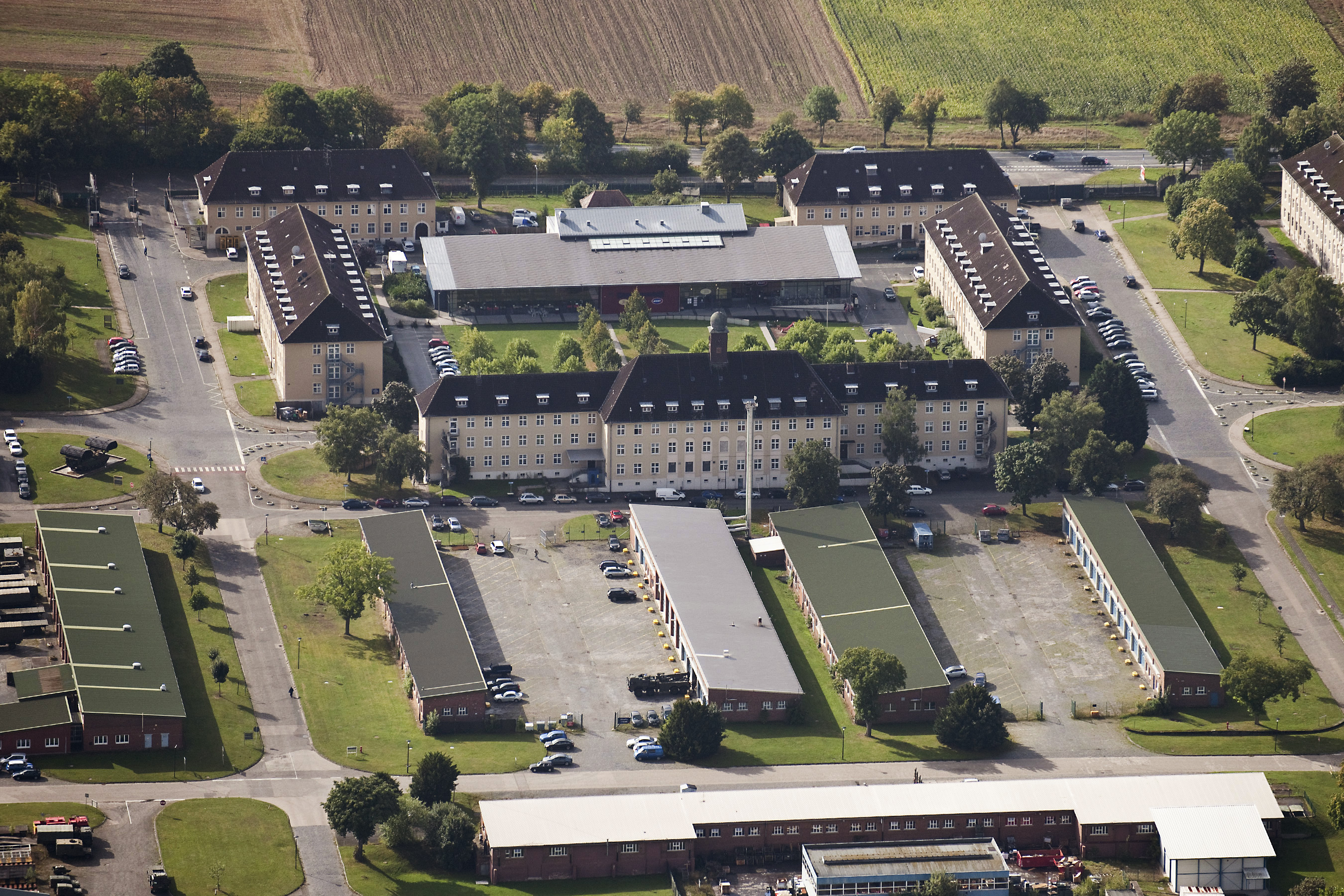
Barker Barracks (formerly the Panzer Kaserne)

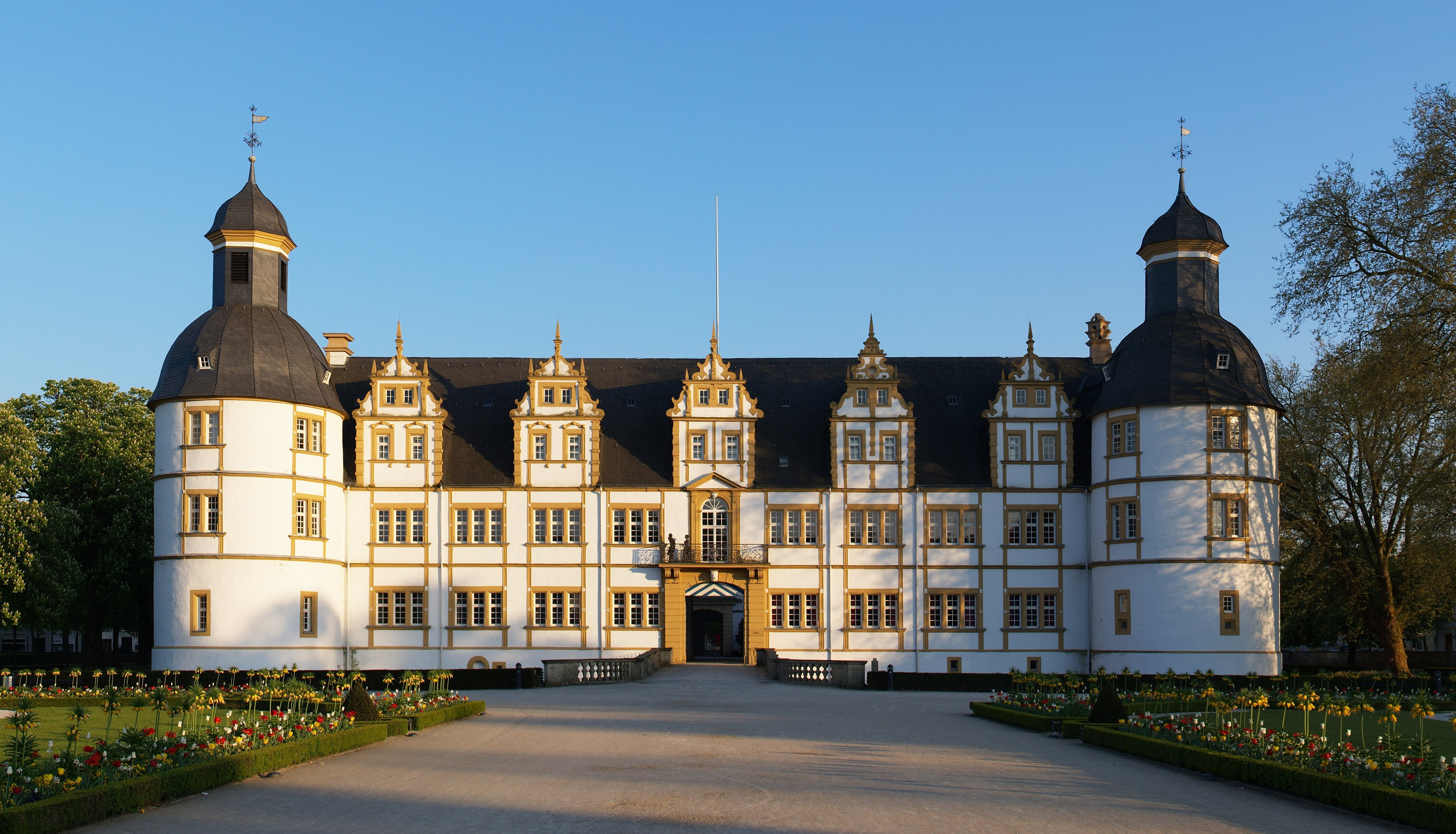
Horrocks Barracks (built in 1370 as Schloss Neuhaus)

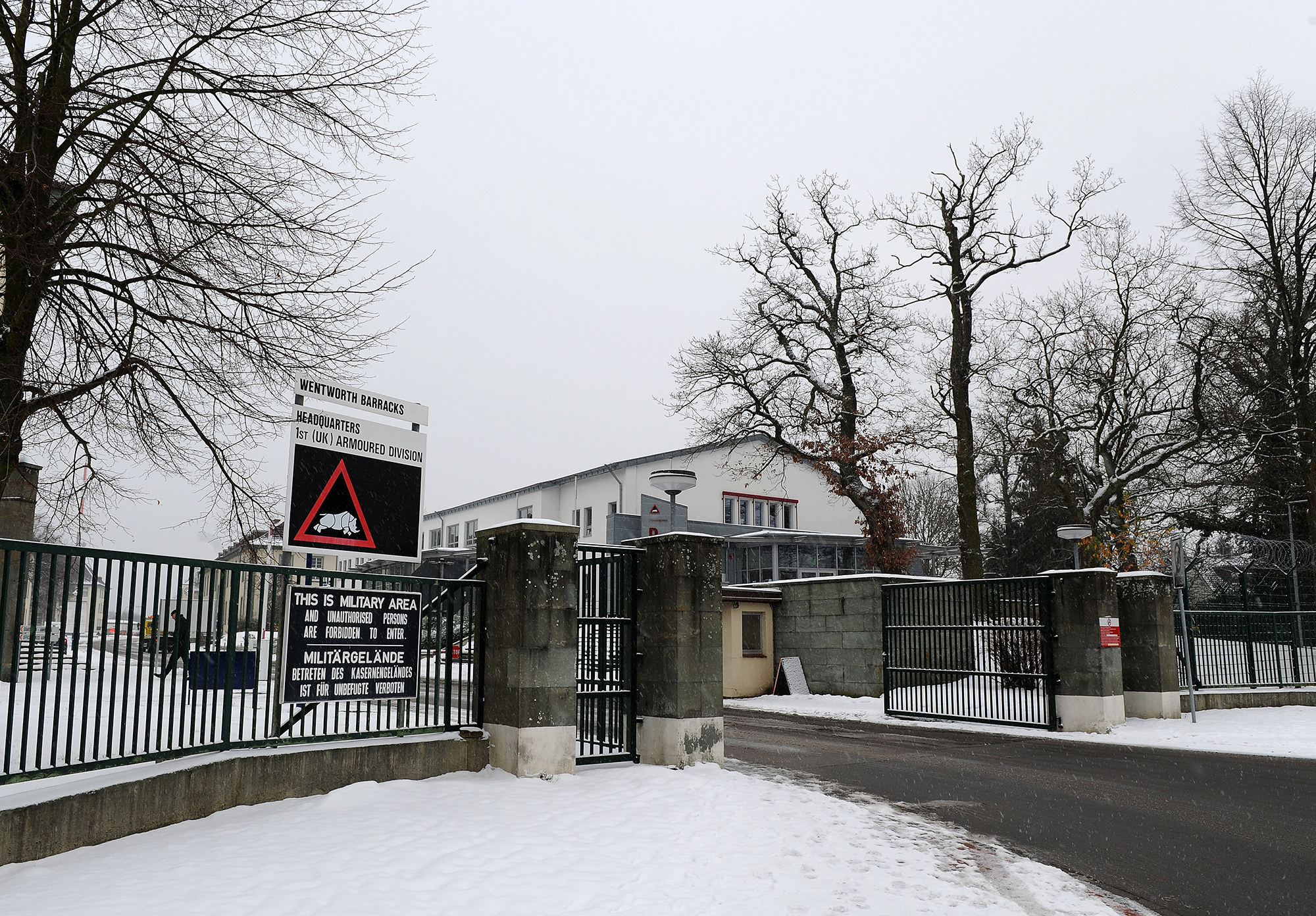
Wentworth Barracks (built in 1934 as Stobbe Kaserne after Major-General Otto Stobbe)

The oldest part of Paderborn Garrison was Schloss Neuhaus at Paderborn which dates back to 1370 and which became Horrocks Barracks after the Second World War. The main part of Paderborn Garrison has its origins in the Infantrie Kaserne, which was built in the early 20th century on Elsenerstrasse, and the Panzer Kaserne, which were built in the 1930s on Driburgerstrasse, and which went on, after the War, to become Alanbrooke Barracks and Barker Barracks respectively.

Linsingen Kaserne (named after General Alexander von Linsingen) was built in Hamelin in the 1930s; this went on to be Gordon Barracks. Meanwhile, at Herford, Estorff Kaserne (named after Major-General Ludwig von Estorff) and Stobbe Kaserne (named after Major-General Otto Stobbe) were built in 1934: these went on, after the war, to become Hammersmith Barracks and Wentworth Barracks respectively. Also at Herford Otto Weddigen Kaserne (named after Captain Otto Weddigen) was built around the same time: this became Harewood Barracks.

Additional barracks that were established at Sennelager, a city quarter of Paderborn, also became part of Paderborn Garrison. Gütersloh Garrison had its origins in two Royal Air Force stations: RAF Sundern which was handed over by the Royal Air Force to the British Army as Mansergh Barracks in 1961 and RAF Gütersloh which was handed over by the Royal Air Force as Princess Royal Barracks in 1993.

The present garrison was created, in accordance with the Ministry of Defence's Army Basing Programme, when Paderborn Garrison and Gütersloh Garrison merged to form a new "super-garrison" named Westfalen Garrison on 1 April 2014. Hameln Station was handed back in November 2014 and Herford Station was handed back, once 1st Armoured Division had changed role and then moved to York, in June 2015. Facilities under the garrison's control include the Sennelager Training Area.

== Locations ==
Locations within the garrison area include:
Paderborn Station (formerly part of Paderborn Garrison):

- Alanbrooke Barracks, named after Field Marshal Viscount Alanbrooke, was the home of 33rd Armoured Brigade through the 1980s until it merged with 20th Armoured Brigade in 1992. Having served as an infantry barracks throughout the 1990s, it was home to 5th Battalion The Rifles (formerly 1st Battalion, the Light Infantry) between 2001 and September 2016.
- Barker Barracks, named after General Sir Evelyn Barker, was home of 20th Armoured Brigade from 1991 to 2001. It was home to 3 (Close Support) Battalion REME from 1995, home to 35 Engineer Regiment from 1999 and home to 1st Battalion, Princess of Wales's Royal Regiment from 2005. It closed in 2019.
- Horrocks Barracks, named after General Sir Brian Horrocks, was home to various minor organisational units until it closed in 1992.

Sennelager Station (formerly part of Paderborn Garrison):

- Antwerp Barracks, named after the City of Antwerp which was captured by the British Second Army in 1944, was home to the 20th Armoured Brigade from 2001 until the brigade returned to the UK in 2019.
- Athlone Barracks, named after Major-General the Earl of Athlone, having served as a cavalry barracks since the 1950s, was home to Queen's Royal Hussars from 1998 until the regiment returned to the UK in 2019. It is now home to the Land Training Fleet (Sennelager).
- Dempsey Barracks, named after General Sir Miles Dempsey, having served as an artillery barracks since the 1960s, was home to 1st The Queen's Dragoon Guards from 2007 until summer 2015, when the barracks were handed over to 1st Armoured Medical Regiment. 1st Armoured Medical Regiment also returned to the UK in 2019.
- Normandy Barracks, has been home to various minor organisational units including the Personnel Recovery Centre. It is now the Headquarters of British Army Germany.

Hameln Station (formerly part of Paderborn Garrison):

- Gordon Barracks, named after Major-General Charles Gordon, having served as an engineer barracks since 1950, was home to 28 Engineer Regiment from 1992 until it closed in 2014.

Gütersloh Station (formerly part of Gütersloh Garrison):

- Mansergh Barracks, named after General Sir Robert Mansergh, having served as an artillery barracks since 1961, was home to 26th Regiment Royal Artillery from 1989 to 2019.
- Princess Royal Barracks, named after Princess Anne, was home to 102 Logistic Brigade from when the facility was handed over by the Royal Air Force in 1993 until it closed in 2016.

Herford Station (formerly part of Gütersloh Garrison):

- Hammersmith Barracks, named after the London borough of Hammersmith, was home to 4th Armoured Division from the early 1960s until 1993. It then housed 1(UK) Armoured Division Signal Regiment until it closed in 2015.
- Harewood Barracks, named after the Harewood Estate in West Yorkshire, having served as a cavalry and tank regiment barracks since 1955, was home to 9th/12th Royal Lancers from 1992 until 1994. It then housed the Sergeant's Mess of 1(UK) Armd Div and its signal regiment until it closed in 2015.
- Wentworth Barracks, named after the Wentworth Estate in Surrey, was home to 1st Armoured Division from 1993 until it closed in 2015.

== See also ==
- Bergen-Hohne Garrison
- Osnabrück Garrison
