= Field Marshal Rommel Barracks, Augustdorf =

German Army military base in Augustdorf, Germany

- North Rhine-Westphalia
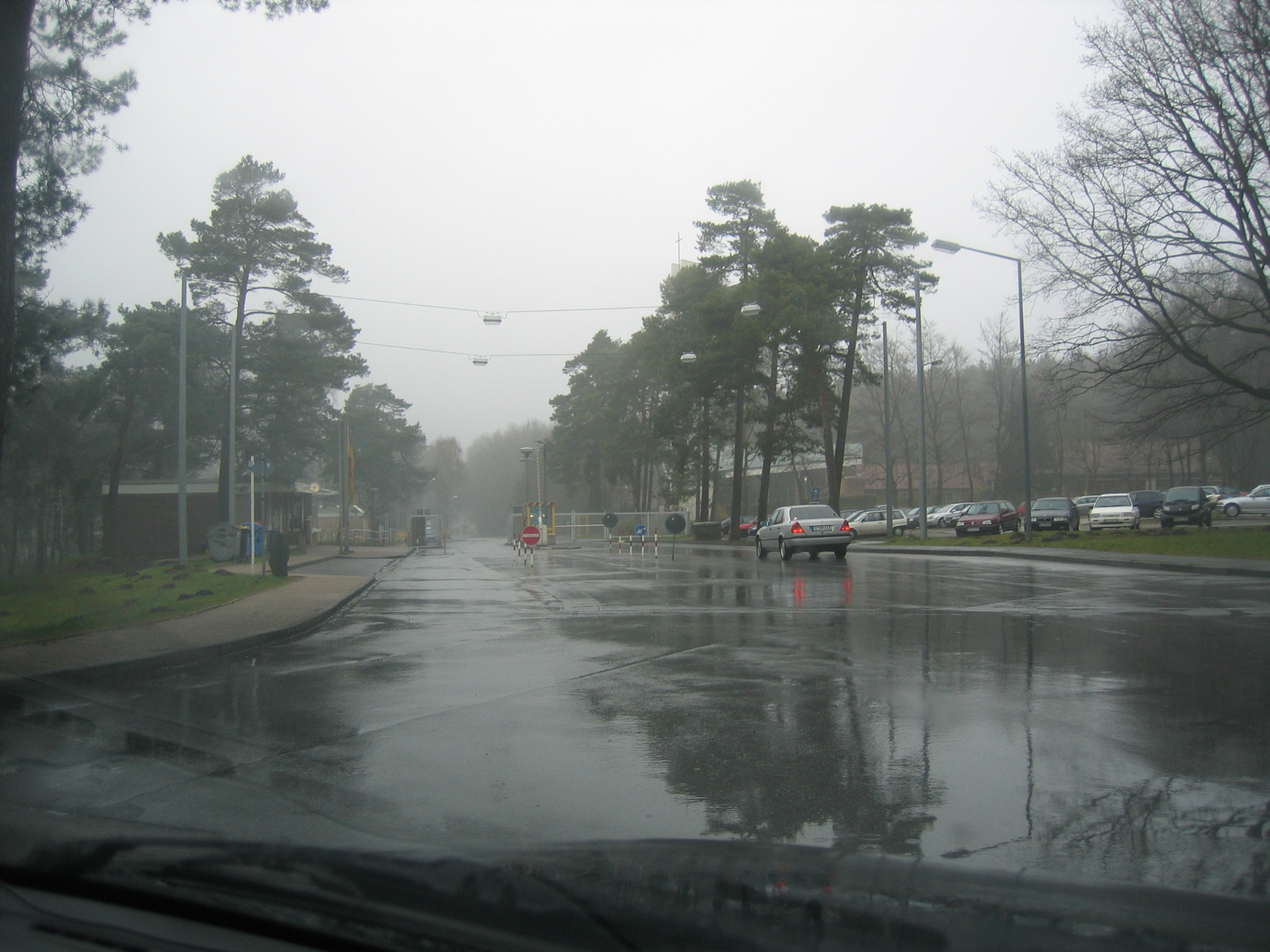
- The northern gate of the Field Marshal Rommel Barracks

Site information
- Type: Military base
- Controlled by: German Army

Location
- Coordinates: 51.914785°N 8.764644°E

Site history
- Built: 1937

The Field Marshal Rommel Barracks, Augustdorf (German: Generalfeldmarschall-Rommel-Kaserne, often abbreviated to GFM-Rommel-Kaserne) is a German Army military base located in Augustdorf in the state of North Rhine-Westphalia, Germany, and the largest base of the German Army. The brigade staff and most of the units of the 21st Panzer Brigade are located there. Around 4,300 soldiers serve on the base.

The base is located on the southern edge of the Teutoburg Forest, and directly adjacent to the Sennelager Training Area where German soldiers train together with British soldiers and other NATO partners.

Named in honour of Field Marshal Erwin Rommel, the street address of the base is Gfm.-Rommel-Straße 1 (1 Field Marshal Rommel Street). The base shares its name with the Rommel Barracks, Dornstadt; a similarly named base, the Field Marshal Rommel Barracks, Osterode, closed down in 2004.

== History ==
The base was established in 1937. It was originally known as Nordlager ("Northern Camp") from 1937. Following rearmament, the old buildings were demolished and replaced with new buildings in the 1950s, and the base was known as Neues Lager ("New Camp") for a few years.

Since 1961 the base has been named Field Marshal Rommel Barracks in honour of Field Marshal Erwin Rommel. Rommel's widow Lucie Rommel and son Manfred Rommel were guests of honour at the dedication.

== The Rommel Barracks today ==
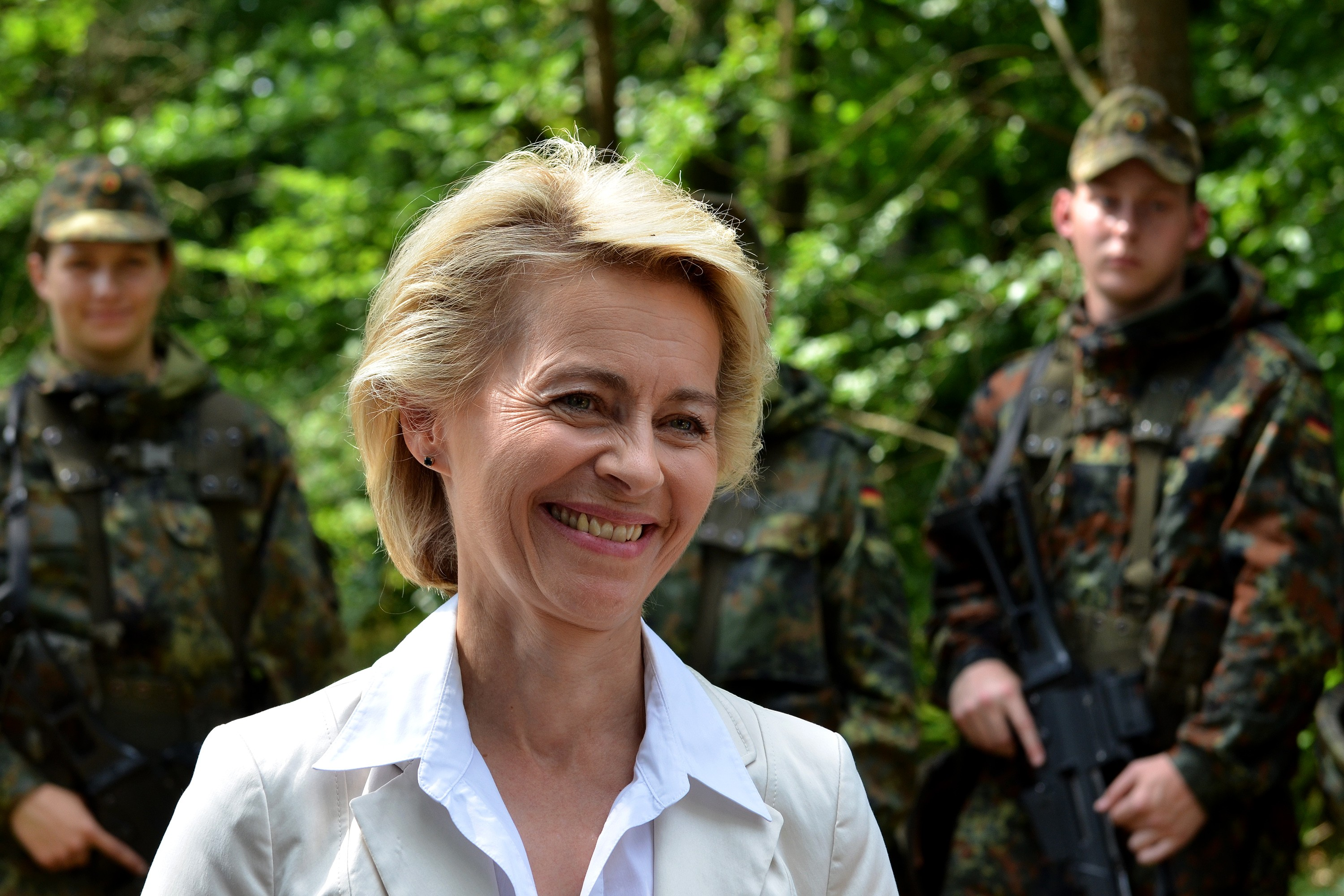
Defence Minister Ursula von der Leyen during a visit to the Rommel Barracks in 2014

The barracks houses around 4,300 soldiers. It is located adjacent to the Sennelager Training Area, where the soldiers train together with soldiers of other NATO countries, mainly British soldiers. Then Defence Minister Ursula von der Leyen described the Rommel Barracks as one of the most important installations of the German military.

The Field Marshal Rommel Barracks is also known for the triannual Augustdorf Soldier's Day (German: Augustdorfer Soldatentag or AST), a military exhibition which has been the largest annual public event of the German Army several times, with tens of thousands of visitors.
