= British Army Germany =

- British Army Germany badge
- Active: 2020–present
- Country: Germany
- Allegiance: United Kingdom
- Branch: British Army
- Type: Headquarters, British Army Germany
- Role: Military command, support, and administration
- Part of: British Armed Forces, UK Ministry of Defence

Commanders
- Current commander: Colonel Mike Foster-Brown

British Army Germany (BAG) is the superior institution under which the remaining installations of the former British Forces Germany (BFG) have been organised since the withdrawal of other British Armed Forces from Germany in February 2020. Apart from the Alpine Training Centre Bavaria in Oberstdorf, which is in Bavaria, British Army Germany is entirely based in North Rhine-Westphalia.

== History ==
British Army Germany was formed in 2020 to administer the remaining service personnel, UK civil servants, and dependents (family members) based in Germany.

== Composition ==
The installations consist of:

=== Normandy Barracks Group, Paderborn ===
(Including Normandy Barracks, Antwerp Barracks, Talbot Barracks, Cavalry Barracks, Polish Barracks, and Depot 90)

- Headquarters, British Army Germany:
  - Commander British Army Germany;
  - Germany Enabling Office (GEO);
  - Germany Support Unit.
- Sennelager Training Centre
  - Command and Staff Trainer;
  - Combined Arms Tactical Trainer;
  - Combat Ready Training Centre.
- 23 Amphibious Engineer Squadron, Royal Engineers (also located in Minden).
- Exercising troops accommodation.

=== Athlone Barracks, Paderborn ===
- Land Readiness Fleet (Sennelager) — which provides and maintains a pool of military vehicles for units in training at Sennelager; thus units in training do not need to bring their own vehicles for the time of the exercise;
- Exercising troops technical accommodation.

=== Ayrshire Barracks, Mönchengladbach ===
- Store Equipment Fleet (Germany) — store of vehicles and other equipment for exercises and operations around Europe.

=== Wulfen ===
- Munitions storage facility

=== Oberstdorf ===
- Alpine Training Centre Bavaria
