= Disappearance of Katrice Lee =

British girl (born 1979)

Katrice Lee
- Born: Katrice Lee; 28 November 1979; Rinteln, West Germany
- Disappeared: 28 November 1981 (aged 2); Horrocks Barracks, Schloß Neuhaus, Paderborn, West Germany (now Germany)
- Status: Missing for 44 years, 11 months and 9 days
- Parents: Richard Lee (father); Sharon Lee (mother)

Locations
1 Last known location

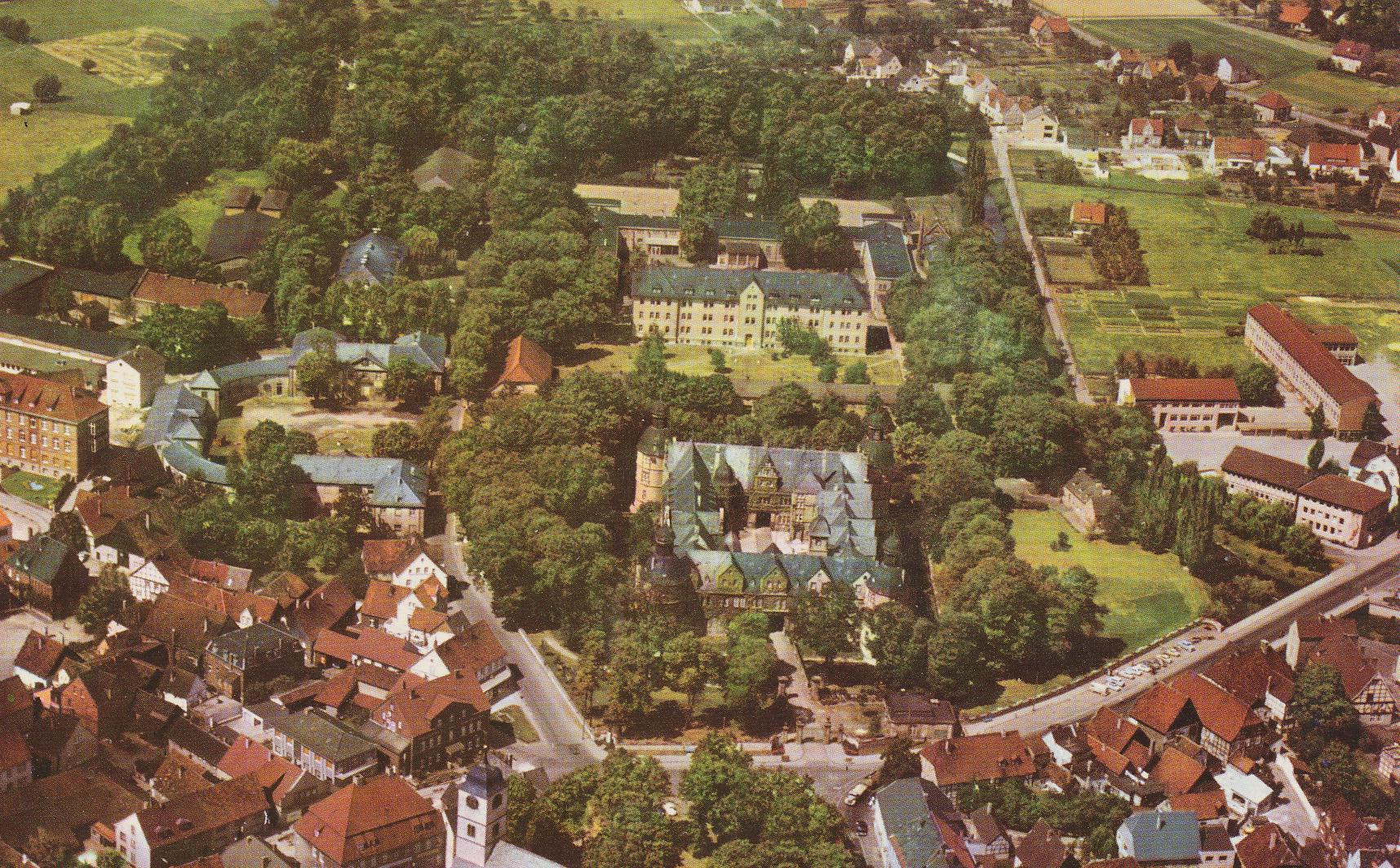
AERIAL VIEW OF HORROCKS BARRACKS AT SCHLOSS NEUHAUS LATE 1960s

Katrice Lee is a British person who has been missing since 28 November 1981. She was last seen in 1981 in Paderborn, West Germany. As of 2025, over 40 years have passed with her whereabouts still remaining a mystery.

== Background ==
Katrice Lee was born on 28 November 1979, at the British Military Hospital in Rinteln, West Germany. Her father, Richard Lee, was a sergeant major in the 15th/19th The King's Royal Hussars of the British Army stationed in West Germany. At the time of her disappearance, Lee lived with her father, her mother Sharon, and her elder sister Natasha in the Schloß Neuhaus area of Paderborn.

== Disappearance ==
On 28 November 1981, which was Katrice's second birthday, the family decided to go to the nearby NAAFI shopping complex in Schloß Neuhaus to buy items for her birthday party. Katrice's elder sister Natasha decided that she did not want to go shopping, while her aunt Wendy and uncle Cliff, who also worked for the British Army, had come over from Bielefeld for the birthday party. Wendy went to the NAAFI complex with Katrice and her parents while Cliff stayed at home with Natasha. Ritchie Lee drove them to the NAAFI and waited for them in the car park. The day was the last payday before Christmas, so the NAAFI complex was exceptionally busy. Katrice decided she did not want to sit in the shopping trolley, so she was carried around the supermarket by her mother Sharon, who placed her down at the checkout. Sharon briefly left the checkout to purchase some crisps before she realized that Katrice was missing. Her aunt Wendy thought Katrice had followed her mother down the aisle, but she had vanished.

=== Description ===
Katrice had curly light brown hair, brown eyes, a pink birthmark slightly to the right of the base of her spine which looked like a rash, and strabismus in her left eye. At the time of her disappearance she was wearing red Wellington boots, a turquoise duffel coat, a green and blue tartan pinafore dress with frills around the shoulders, a white blouse underneath, and white tights.

== Investigation ==
The military police had jurisdiction and worked with the West German civil police because the NAAFI building was within a German town located on civilian premises. Both the military and German police believed Katrice had fallen into the nearby River Lippe and drowned, but no body was ever discovered. The German police refused to go to the press, and it was six weeks before an item appeared in the local newspaper. The investigation produced little result, and despite dredging the river and conducting house-to-house inquiries, no trace of Katrice was found.

Police re-opened the case in 2000, after computer technology helped them to form an image of how Katrice might look in her twenties. People came forward who had never been interviewed, including a young man who had been standing behind the Lees at the checkout, and one of the checkout women. One woman also came forward to say that her boyfriend at the time, who was in the same regiment as Katrice's father, had confessed to murdering a child. The man now lived in Northumbria, and the military police interviewed him but he denied it, and the woman who gave the details died soon after, therefore ending the lead. Afterwards the military police told the family they thought he was probably a fantasist.

Three possible sightings of Katrice Lee came after her story appeared on the BBC television show Missing Live, where during the show a digital rendering of the potential appearance of Katrice as a 29-year-old was shown. Natasha Lee, Katrice's elder sister, appeared on Crimewatch to highlight the appeal, after which an anonymous woman phoned and left a message on Richard Lee's answer machine, saying to "look for your daughter in France". The police took the answer machine tape away, but there was nothing more to the investigation.

One line of enquiry followed by the police is that Katrice was intentionally abducted from the NAAFI complex, and has possibly been raised by another family in Germany, the United Kingdom, or elsewhere in Europe, unaware of her true identity. Lee was born with a distinctive condition in her left eye which would have required two medical operations to correct; an appeal was made for medical personnel with knowledge of such operations to come forward if they had operated on a child.

In 2012 the Royal Military Police and then Defence Minister Mark Francois apologised to Katrice's parents, after an inquiry found failings in their investigation. The Royal Military Police began a reinvestigation, called Operation Bute. A civilian review of the reinvestigation was completed in 2015, but the details weren't made public, or shared with the family.

In April 2018, it was announced that the British Military police, in conjunction with the German police, would spend five weeks undertaking a forensic search on the banks of the Alme river. The search did not uncover any new information. In September 2019, a man living in Swindon, Wiltshire, England, was arrested in connection with her disappearance, though subsequently released without charge.

== See also ==
- List of people who disappeared mysteriously (1980s)
