= Sennelager =

- Village of Paderborn
- Interactive map of Sennelager
- Location within Germany Location within North Rhine-Westphalia
- Coordinates: 51°46′N 8°43′E
- Country: Germany
- State: North Rhine-Westphalia
- Admin. region: Detmold
- District: Paderborn
- Town: Paderborn
- Elevation: 109 m (358 ft)
- Time zone: UTC+01:00 (CET)
  - Summer (DST): UTC+02:00 (CEST)
- Postal codes: 33104
- Dialling codes: 05254
- Vehicle registration: PB
- Website: sennelager.net

Sennelager (German pronunciation: [ˈzɛnəˌlaːɡɐ]) is a village in Germany that forms part of the City of Paderborn. It is notable for its association with the military since the 19th century.

== Location ==

Sennelager lies around 5 km north of Paderborn city centre in the west of the landscape "Senne". The area falls under the administration of the Schloß Neuhaus/Sande wards of the city. To the south between Sennelager and the city of Paderborn is Schloss Neuhaus, to the west Sande, and to the north Hövelhof.

== History ==
The name Sennelager literally translates as "camp on the Senne", a name originating from 1851 when the Prussian Army used the area as a training camp for their cavalry. At the time, the area belonged to what was then the Neuhaus region and was largely unpopulated. This camp later expanded into a full training facility for the armed forces, most notably during the reign (1888–1918) of Wilhelm II.

The word Senne itself derives from the old Low German word sinedi, meaning "sand".

During World War I a POW camp here housed British and French soldiers as well as, in a distinct section, various civilians. These were merchant seamen, including many British trawlermen taken prisoner after German raiders sank their ships in the North Sea, especially in the first days of the war. Many of the fishermen came from Boston or from Grimsby in Lincolnshire. Many were later transferred to Ruhleben internment camp near Berlin, where many remained for the duration of the war.

During the Third Reich the Wehrmacht used the village as a military loading station, and the village's railway station shows signs of this – there are facilities for loading military vehicles onto trains which are still regularly used by the British and German armies. The Catholic order of the Salvatorians, who were based in the still-standing Heilandsfrieden House, was disbanded and driven out of Sennelager by the Nazis in 1941; they were forbidden to settle anywhere in Westphalia or in the Rhineland.

At the end of World War II in 1945, the historic military base passed first briefly into the administration of the United States Army, before a more long-term handover to the British who use the Sennelager Training Area and as the base for their Westfalen Garrison. Late june 1963, a Belgian C119 was hit by a mortar shell when passing above shooting range, while all shooting where supposed to have ended. The plane later crashed claiming the life of 37 belgians and one congolese soldiers. On May 26, 1965, Queen Elizabeth II and Prince Philip visited "The British Army of the Rhine" at Sennelager camp.

== Connections ==
The former Bundesstraße B68 runs through the village, which is now Bielefelder Straße; this now runs through to the northerly-lying village of Hövelhof. The B68 has since been replaced by the north–south A33, which can be accessed at the Paderborn-Sennelager junction.

Sennelager train station is served by a regular train service operated by Veolia Transport-owned NordWestBahn that runs between the Paderborn main station and Bielefeld. The service operates on an hourly basis, although train times are different on Monday to Friday mornings to allow a higher number of services to run to allow for the considerable commuter traffic.

Two regular bus services, the number 1 and the number 420, connect Sennelager to Paderborn City Centre.

== Culture ==
Modern culture in Sennelager is largely influenced by the presence of the British Armed Forces in the village. The area contains several British settlements, and businesses have opened there largely to cater for this market, including a "traditional" British corner shop (Little England), several tax-free car dealerships and some British pubs. There is also an industrial estate containing a NAAFI supermarket (only accessible to forces personnel and their families), car dealership and electrical goods dealer (SSVC).

In a play on old Carlsberg beer advertisements from the 1980s, many British soldiers use the phrase "Sennelager: probably the worst lager in the world" to refer to the training area.

== Education ==
There used to be three British schools, two First schools (one being William Wordsworth School, named after the poet, and the other Robert Browning School, named after the writer who wrote the Pied Piper story set in Hamelin (Hameln) . There was also one middle school called John Buchan Middle School, which used to educate the children of the British families resident in the area. When the children reached year 9 they would go on to Kings School in Gütersloh which was about 45 minutes away. The secondary school closed in 2019 and the two First schools in Sennelager have amalgamated to create a single primary school known as Attenborough Primary School. There is also a primary school, a Catholic and a civic kindergarten for the German residents. Children of German families in the area generally go on to attend secondary school in Schloß Neuhaus or Paderborn itself.
