= Horrocks Barracks =

British Military installation in Schloss Neuhaus, Germany (BAOR)

- Schloss Neuhaus

Site information
- Type: Barracks
- Operator: British Army

Location
- Location within Germany
- Coordinates: 51°44′43″N 08°42′44″E

Site history
- Built: 1257 – present
- Built for: Prince Bishop of Paderborn
- In use: 1945 – 1992 (BAOR)

Garrison information
- Garrison: Paderborn Garrison

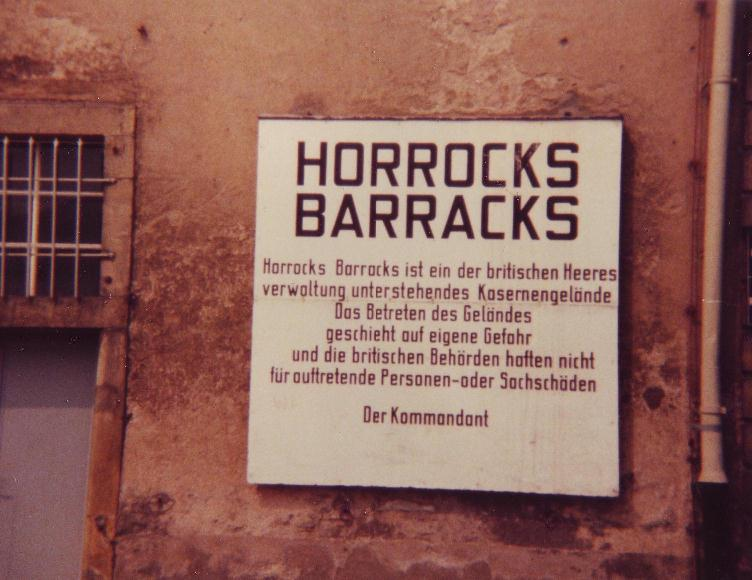
Sign at the main gate of Horrocks Barracks, Schloss Neuhaus, 1983.

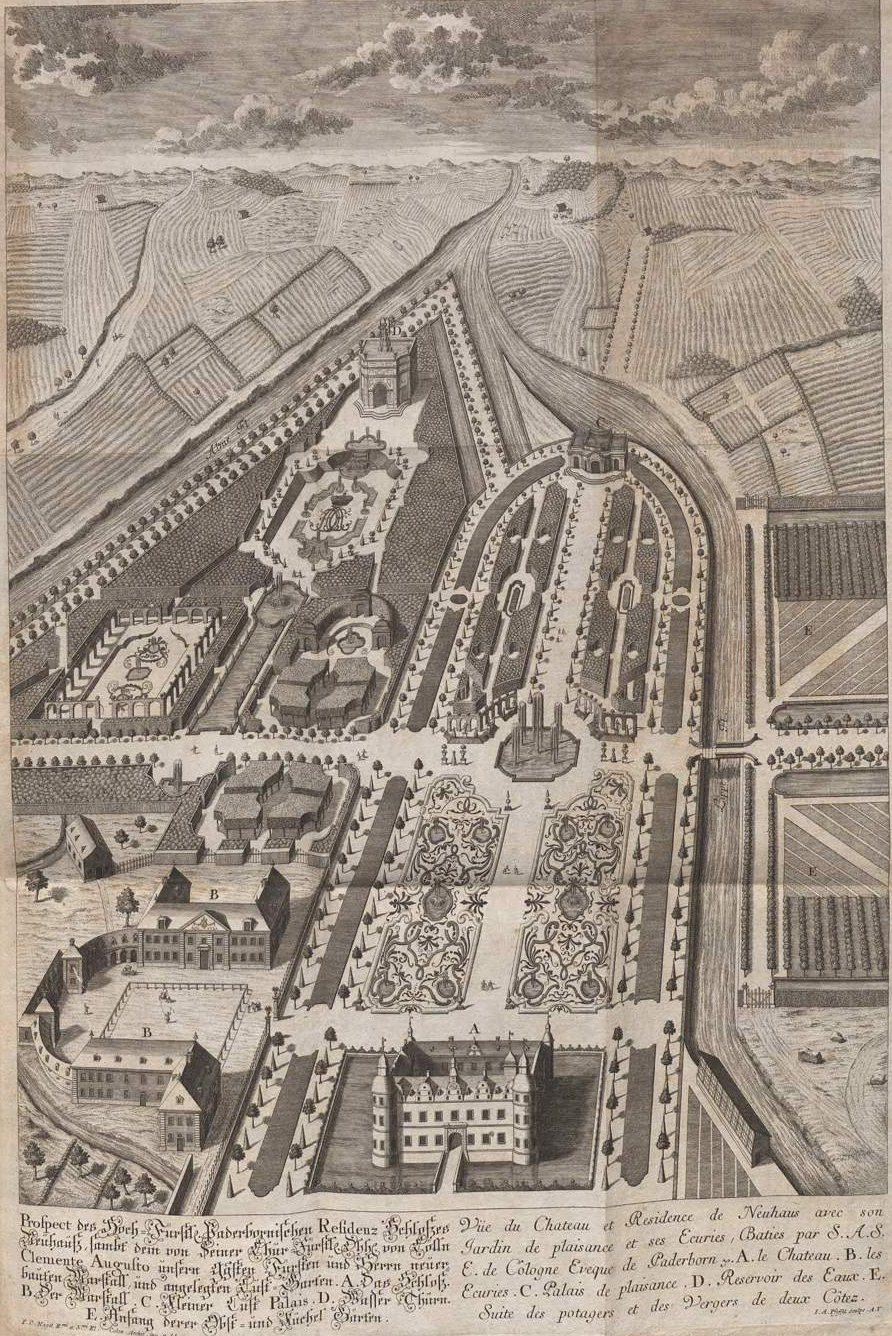
The site of Horrocks Barracks in 1736 (Schloss Neuhaus and Gardens).

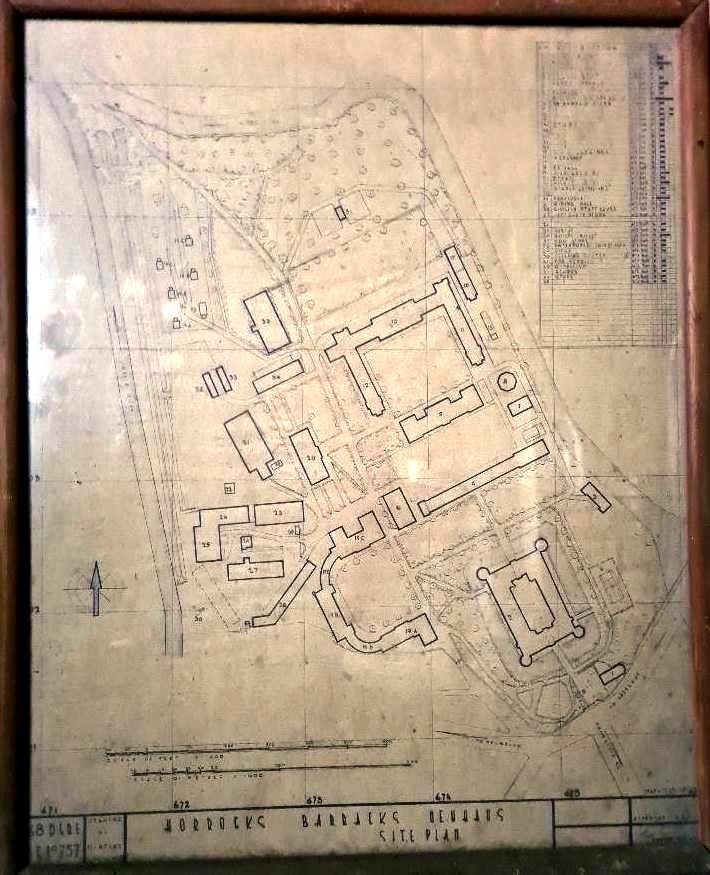
Site Plan of Horrocks Barracks (1945 - 1992), located in and around the castle at Schloss Neuhaus, Germany, early 1950s.

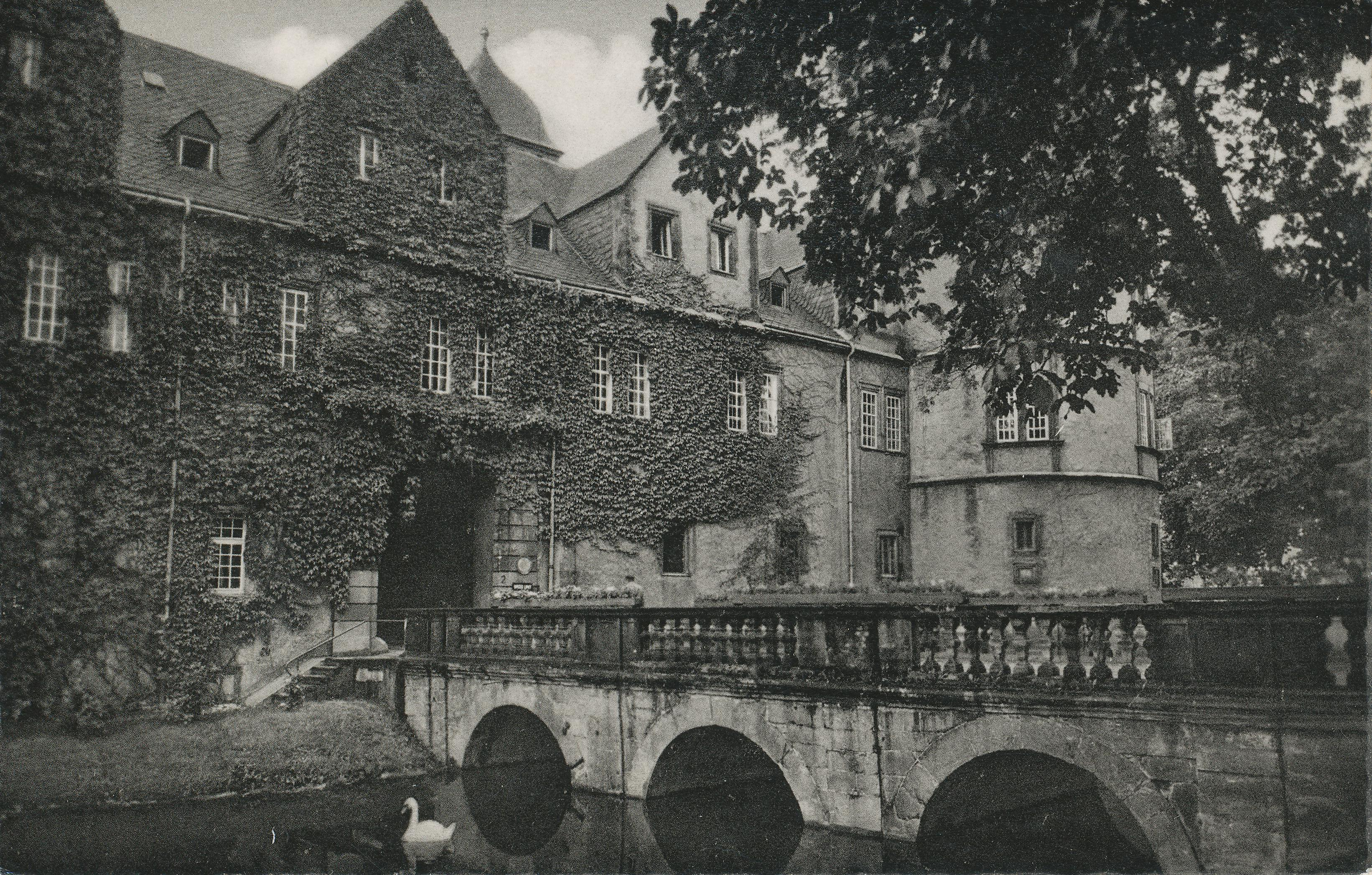
Entrance of Neuhaus Castle, the building number according to the Horrocks Barracks site plan was no. 2 (visible on the right of the entrance), 1957.

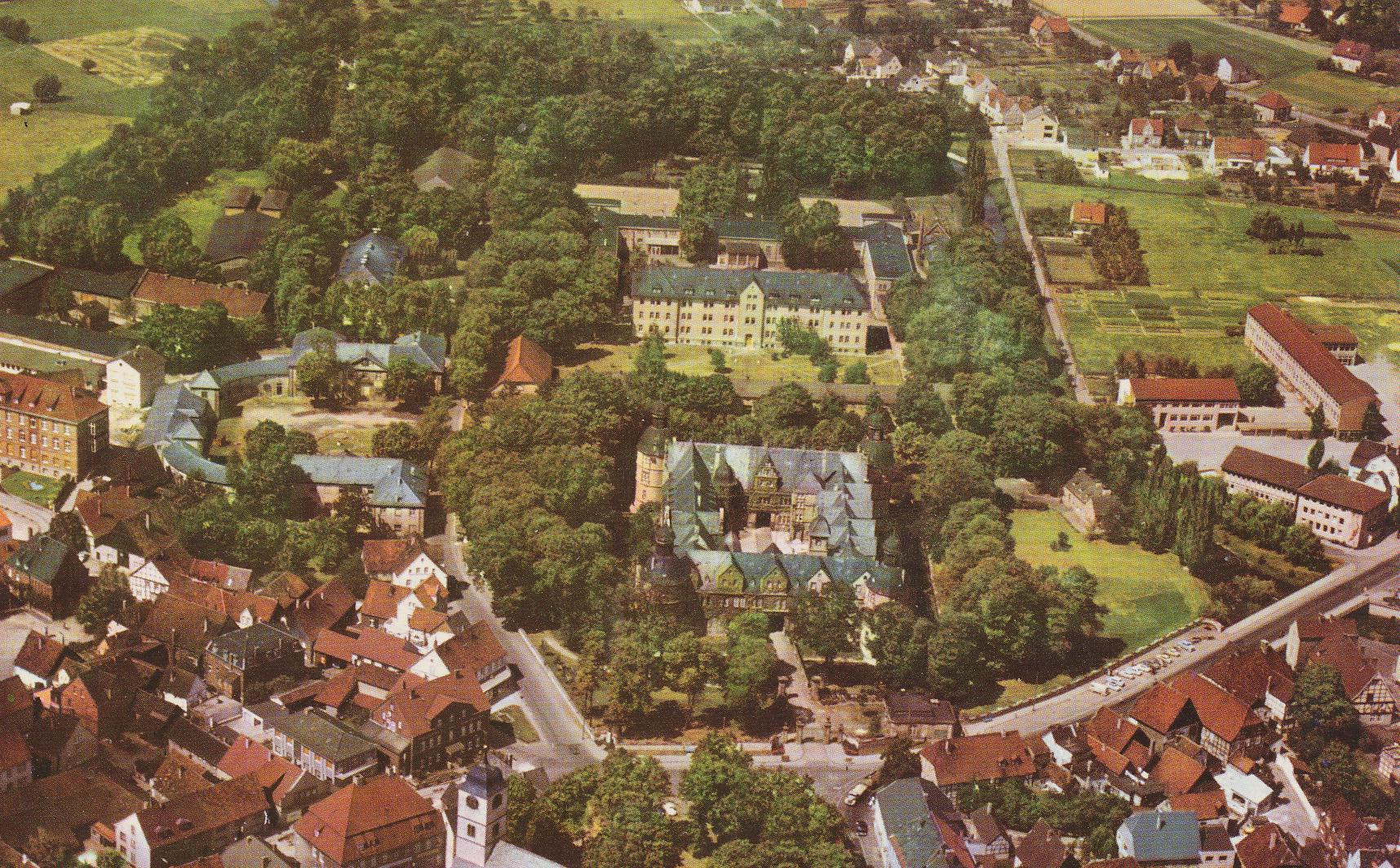
Aerial view of the complete site of Horrocks Barracks, late 1960s.

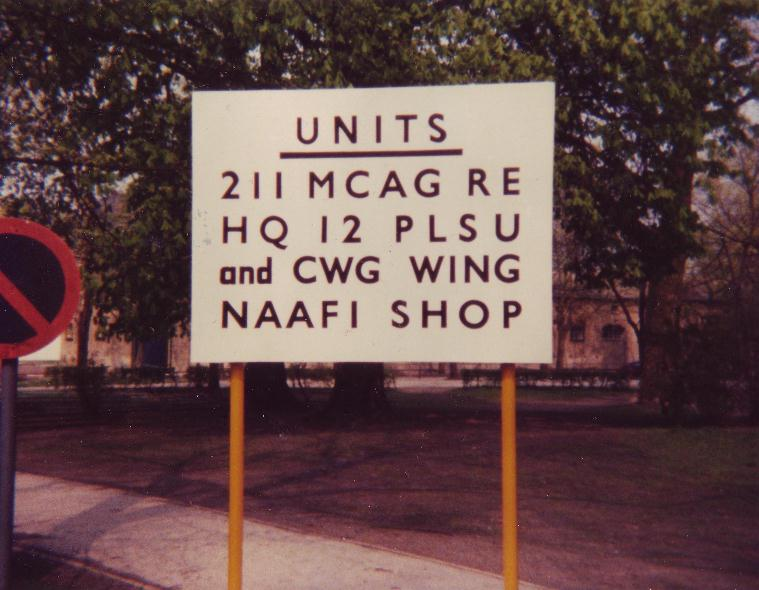
Sign at the main gate of Horrocks Barracks, Schloss Neuhaus, 1983. The Garrison Stables ("Langer Stall") can be seen in the background.

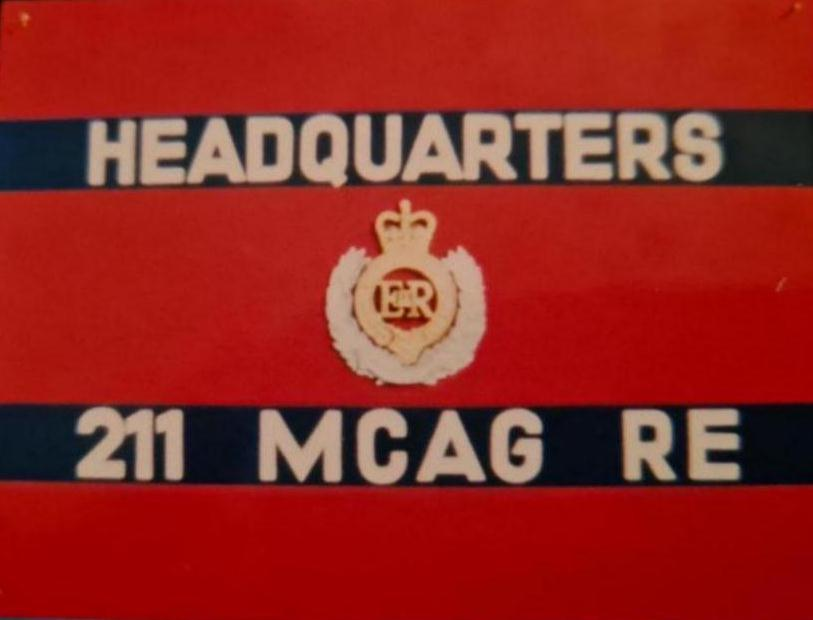
Unit Sign at Horrocks Barracks: HQ 211 MCAG RE, 1978.

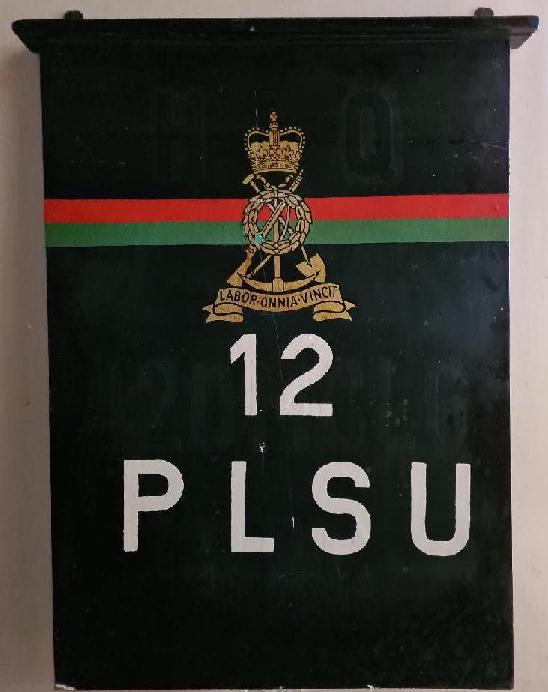
Unit Sign at Horrocks Barracks: 12 PLSU RPC, 1983.

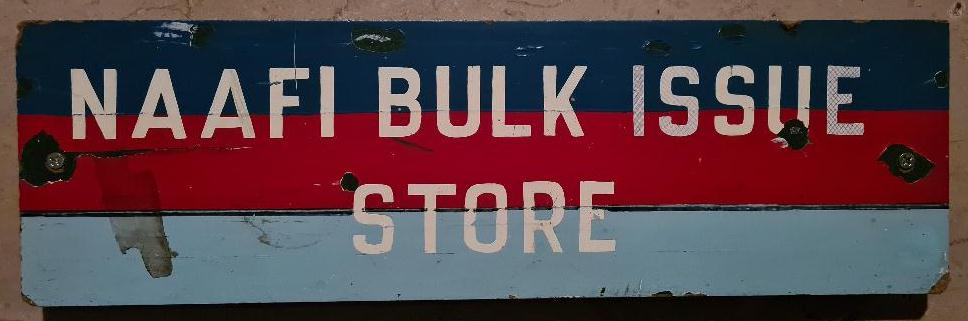
Sign of the NAAFI BULK ISSUE STORE at Horrocks Barracks, Neuhaus, 1978.

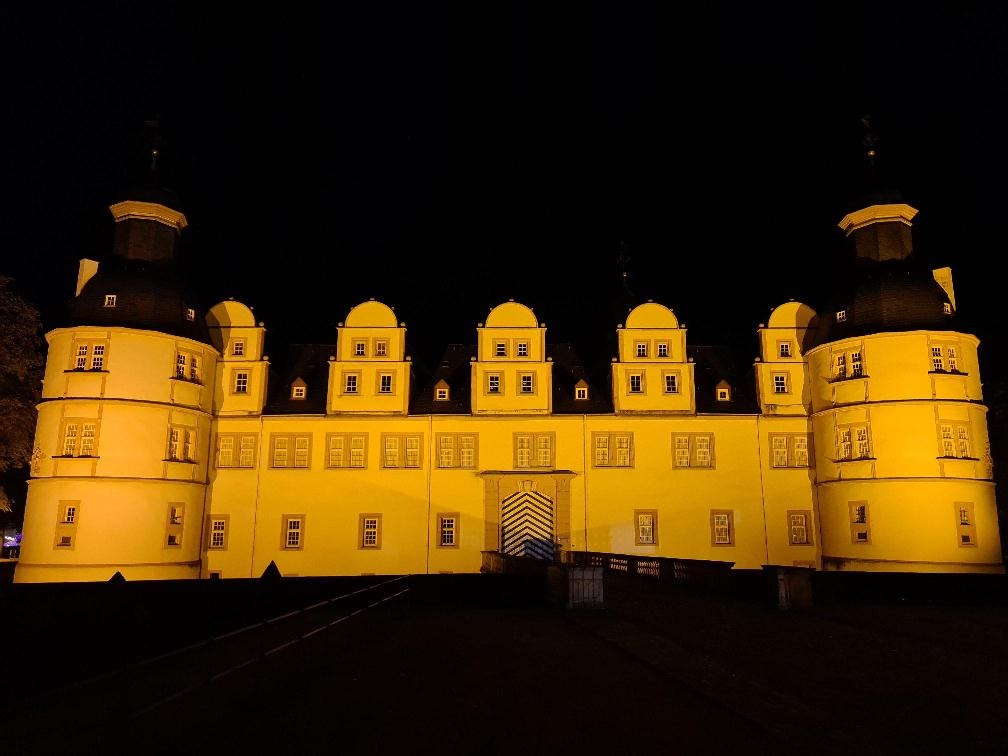
Schloss Neuhaus Castle, known as Horrocks Barracks 1945 – 1992, as seen 21 August 2022.

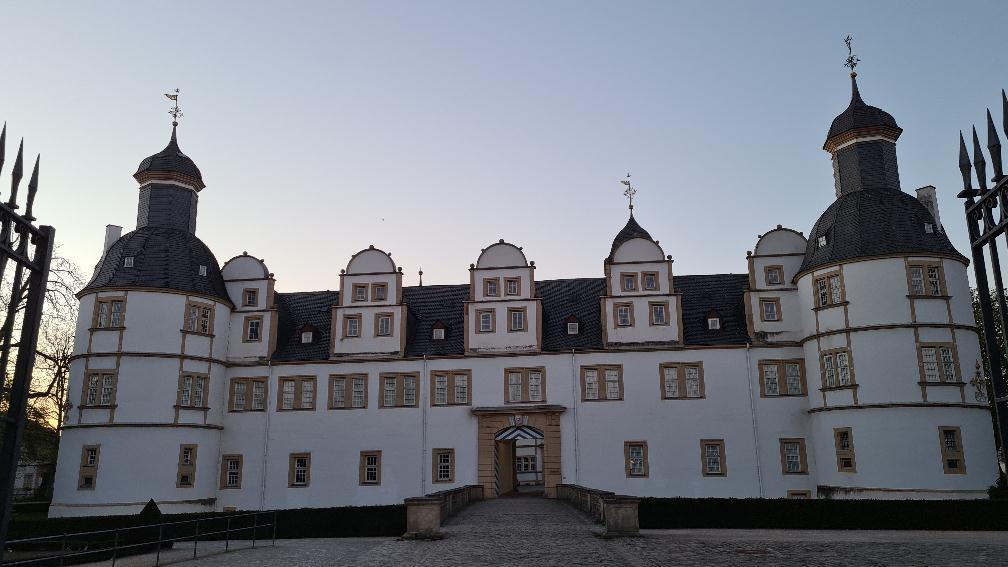
Schloss Neuhaus Castle, known as Horrocks Barracks 1945 – 1992, as seen 4 April 2025. 80 years after being captured by US-troops.

Horrocks Barracks was a military installation in Schloss Neuhaus, Germany.

== Description ==
Horrocks Barracks was located in the grounds of Schloss Neuhaus, about four kilometres from the Paderborn city centre, and covered approximately 30 acres (12 hectares) of land. The barracks was bordered by the rivers Pader, Lippe and Alme ("Castle Island") and the Residenzstrasse.

== History ==
=== 1257 – 1802: Beginnings and Palace of the Prince Bishops of Paderborn ===
Construction of the castle began in 1257 under bishop Simon I. zur Lippe (1247–1277). Around 1370 and after numerous attacks bishop Heinrich von Spiegel (1361–1380) built the still existing part of the castle ("Haus Spiegel") and made it the constant palace of the prince bishops of Paderborn. Extensions are:

- "Haus Braunschweig" (1524–1526)
- "Haus Köln" (1534) which connected the first two buildings.
- "Haus Kerssenbrock" (1548–1560)
- "Haus Fürstenberg" and the four towers (1590–1597)

In 1736 the garden next to the castle was completed. It is now part of the Garden Heritage Network - EGHN.

Additional historic buildings around the castle from that period are:

- "Marstall" (Stables, 1729–1732/1733, block 19A - 19E)
- "Schlosswache" (Guard House, 1733, block 1)

=== 1802 – 1945: French and Prussian Use (Schloss-Kaserne) ===
The Kingdom of Prussia officially annexed the whole site 3 August 1802. In 1804 the Prince Bishop finally left the castle and moved to Hildesheim.

Before being used as a military installation the different buildings served as a cloth factory with 120 to 130 employees (1806-1819, Zurhelle & Delhas, from Lippstadt), a Royal Prussian Field Hospital (1805) and a prison (1810-1814, during the French period).

The "Schloss-Kaserne" was then home to

- 4th (Westphalian) Cuirassiers "von Driesen" (6 October 1820 – 17 August 1833)
- 6th (Thuringian) Uhlans (September 1833–17 March 1848, and 28 October 1848 – 16 May 1849)
- 20th Landwehr-Regiment Berlin (1849-1849)
- Depot of 3rd (Brandenburg) Hussars “von Zieten” (13 October 1840–1851)
- 2nd Westphalian Hussar Regiment, No. 11 (22 December 1850-1851)
- 8th (1st Westphalian) Hussars "Emperor Nicholas II of Russia" (24 February 1851–1919)
- Reiter-Regiment Nr. 15 (1921–1945)

The following buildings date back to the Prussian use of the site:

- "Kleine Reithalle" (1824, block 18, now the "Städtische Gallerie in der Reithalle")
- "Lange Stall" (1824, block 6, Garrison Stables during British use, demolished 1986)
- "Kompaniegebäude" (1876–1878, block 9, HQ 12 PLSU RPC, demolished 1992)
- "Reithalle mit Stallungen" (1876–1878, blocks 10 - 12, NAAFI Shop, now the "Schlosshalle")
- "Waschhaus"/"Alte Kommandantur" (1883/1884, block 3, HQ 211 MCAG RE, now the offices of the Schloss- and Auenpark)
- "Block 20" (1935/1936, 420 MCLG RPC, now part of GSN Gymnasium Schloss Neuhaus)
- various buildings used as quarters, stables, stores and garages (NAAFI Bulk Issue Store, blocks 23 - 27 and 29 (except for block 27 it was decided in 1985 to have them demolished in 1986)

=== 1945 – 1992: British Use (Horrocks Barracks) ===
The site was captured by troops of the U.S. 9th Army 3 April 1945, at 18.00, during the Battle of the Ruhr Pocket. The Battle of the Ruhr Pocket involved the British Second Army, part of the 21st Army Group. These two formations took over command at Neuhaus 5 May 1945, and became British Army of the Rhine 25 August 1945.

For use by the British Army, the barracks was named after Lieutenant-General Sir Brian Horrocks. The allocated British Forces Post Office number was 16. Over the years it was home to several units. Among them are:

- 368 Works Gp RE (Royal Engineers)
- 1st Battalion Royal Norfolk Regiment, 1946-1947
- 211 MCAG RE (Royal Engineers, June 1947–1992)
- 420 MCLG RPC (Royal Pioneer Corps)
- 2 PCLU RPC B DETACHMENT (Royal Pioneer Corps), 1959-1983, redesignated in 1983 as:
- 12 PLSU RPC with CWG Wing (Royal Pioneer Corps), 1983-1992
- NAAFI Shop and NAAFI Bulk Issue Store
- Garrison Stables (the Equestrian Centre then moved to Athlone Barracks) used by various units of Paderborn Garrison. Among them:
- 17th/21st Lancers (1962-1968)

1957 marked the 700th anniversary of the castle and Her Majesty Queen Elizabeth II gifted the community a pair of Thames swans, handed over by Major J L Jordan, OC 211 MCAG RE BAOR, in June 1957.

In 1959 the British Forces handed back the Schloss itself to the Federal Republic of Germany. It was then purchased by the City of Paderborn 25 June 1964. and it was officially handed over to the community 19 July 1964.

The NAAFI shop at Schloss Neuhaus was in the spotlight 28 November 1981, when a 2-year-old child, Katrice Lee, went missing during a shopping expedition with her family.

The NAAFI shop building as well as the NAAFI Bulk Issue Store buildings were handed back to the German authorities in November 1985. Before, the NAAFI shop moved to its present location at Sennelager and was officially opened 16 April 1985 by Brigadier Eric M Westropp, Commander 33 Armoured Brigade.

Horrocks Barracks closed, after 47 years, 20 July 1992, when Brigadier Arthur G Denaro, Commander 33 Armoured Brigade, handed over the keys to the Mayor of Paderborn.

Plaques of British Army Units at Horrocks Barracks
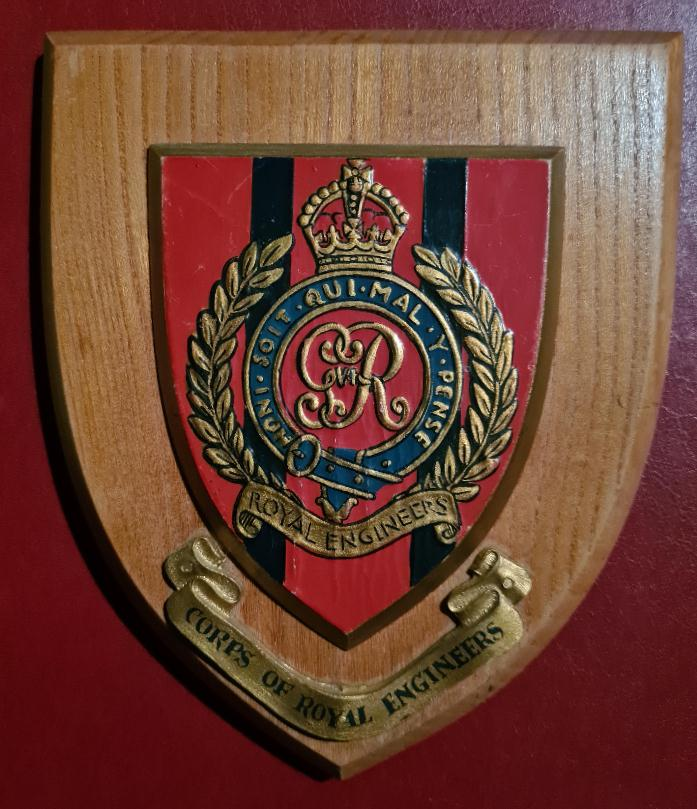
King George VI mess plaque of the Corps of Royal Engineers.

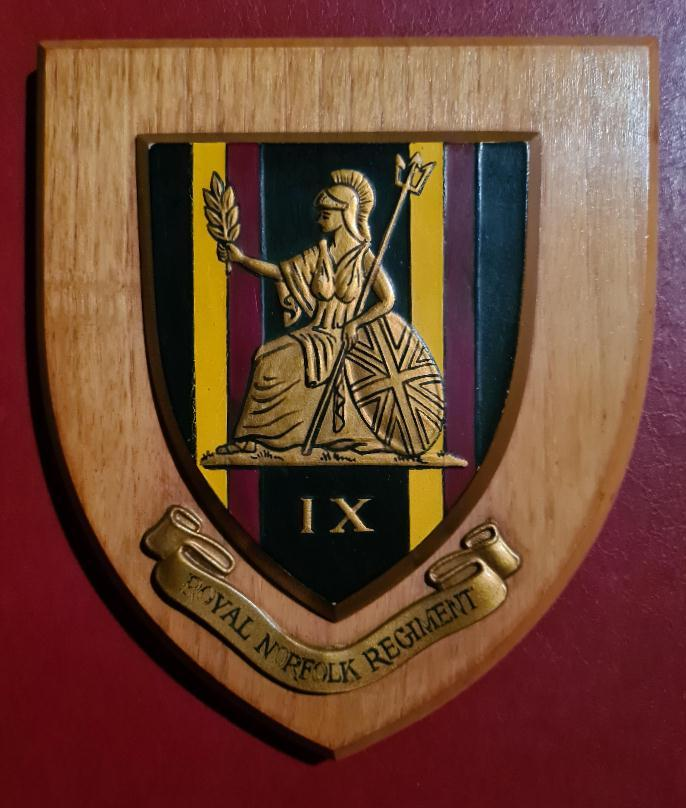
The Royal Norfolk Regiment.

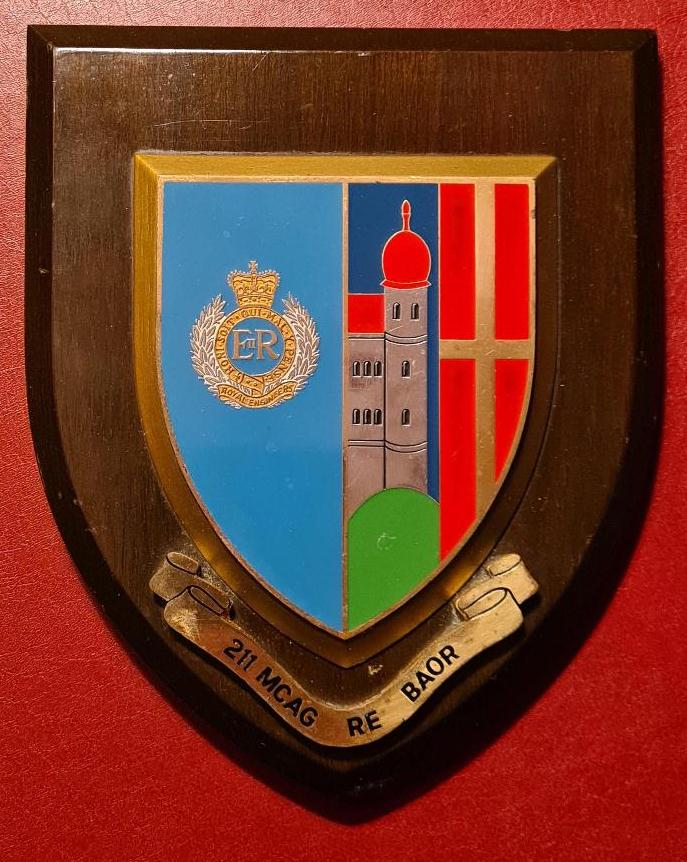
211 MCAG, Corps of Royal Engineers.

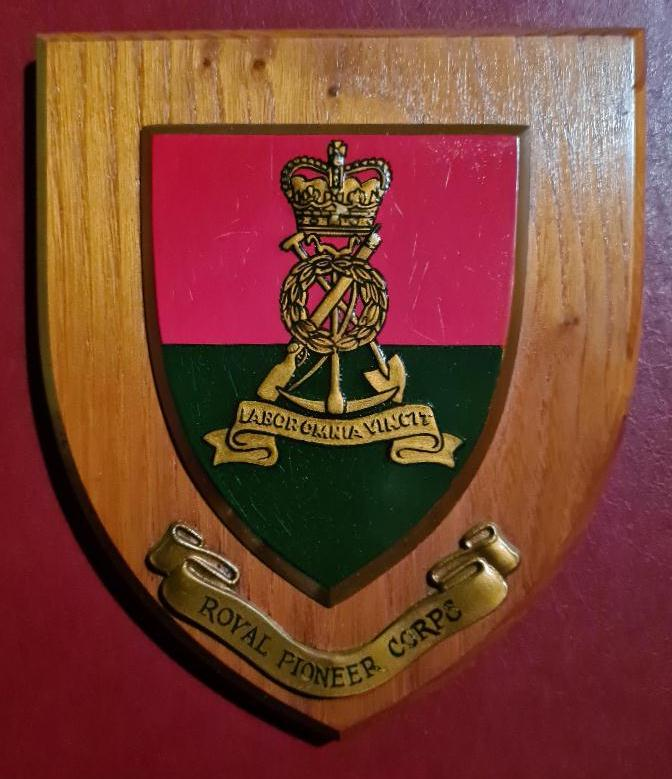
The Royal Pioneer Corps, until 1985.

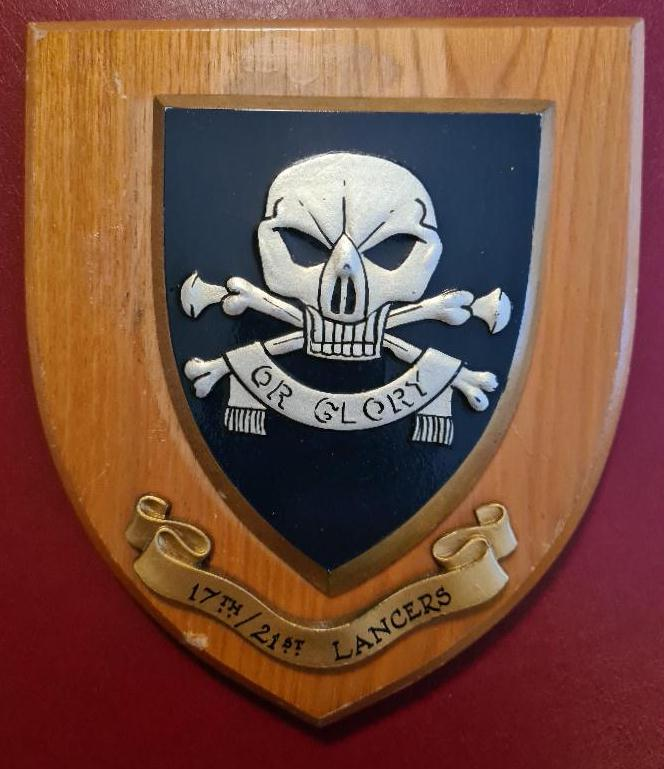
The 17th/21st Lancers.

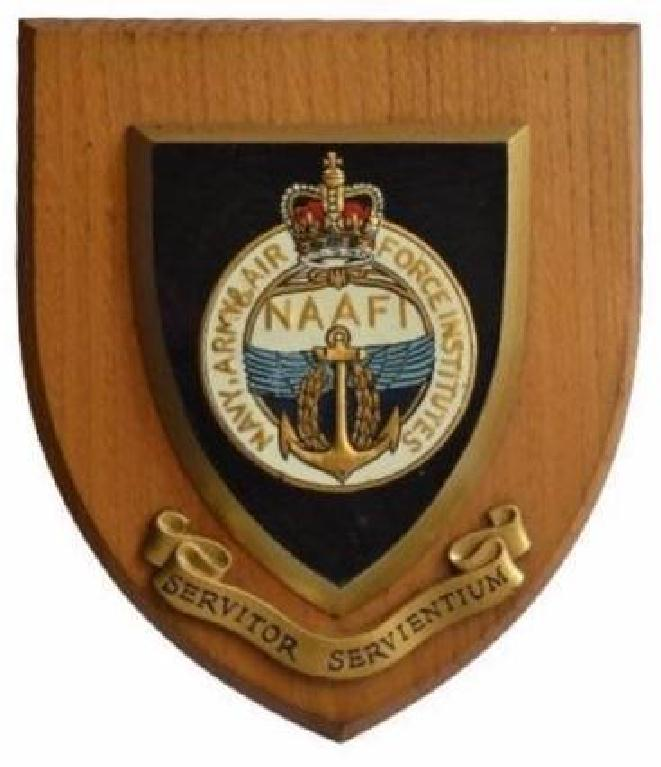
The Navy, Army and Air Force Institutes (NAAFI).

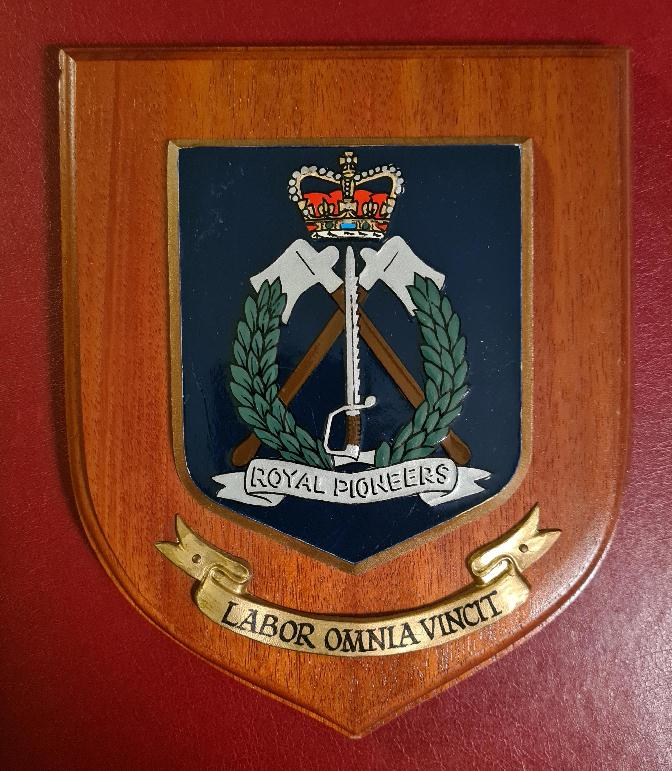
The Royal Pioneer Corps, as per 13 February 1985.

=== 1992 – present: Landesgartenschau 1994 ===
The whole Schloss-area was handed back to the German authorities in 1992 to create what was the "Landesgartenschau 1994". 211 MCAG RE undertook the construction of six twin city partnership gardens as a Military Aid to the Civil Community (MACC) task. The former NAAFI-shop-building was first known as the "Bürgerhaus" and nowadays as the "Schlosshalle".

Further Impressions Through the Centuries
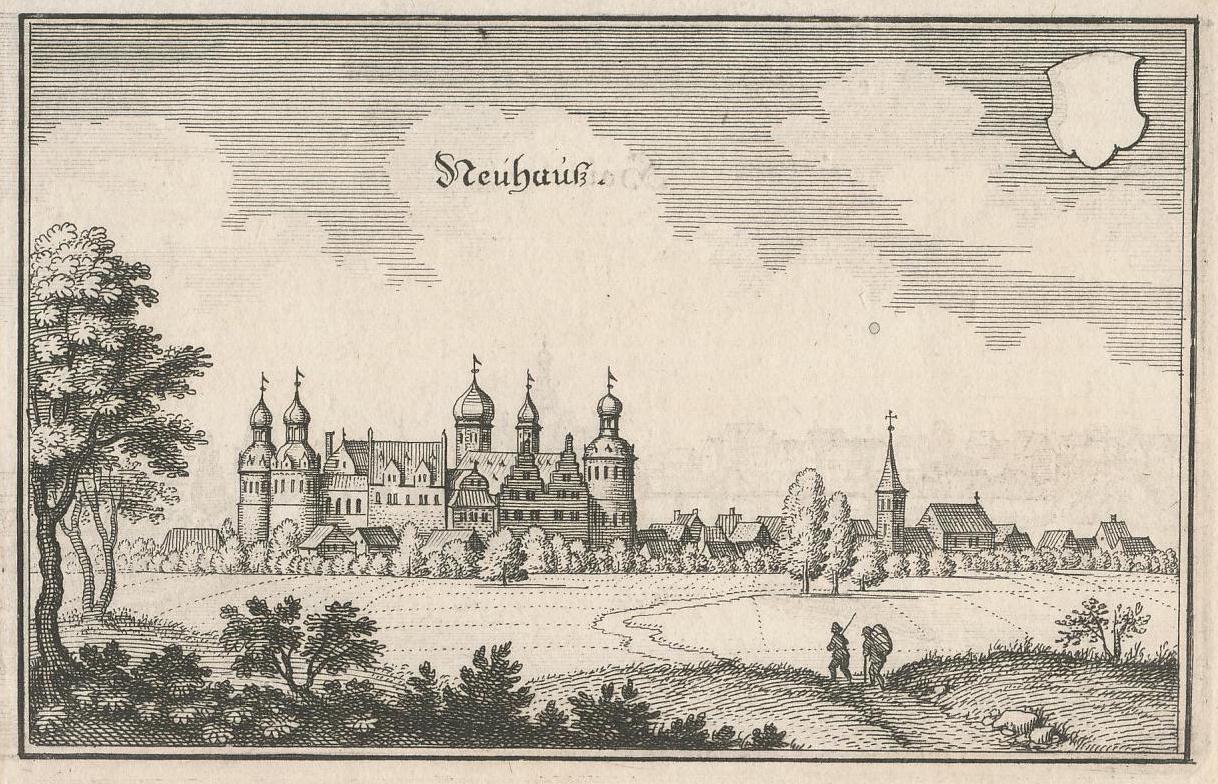
View of Neuhaus castle, 1647 (Topographia Westphaliae).

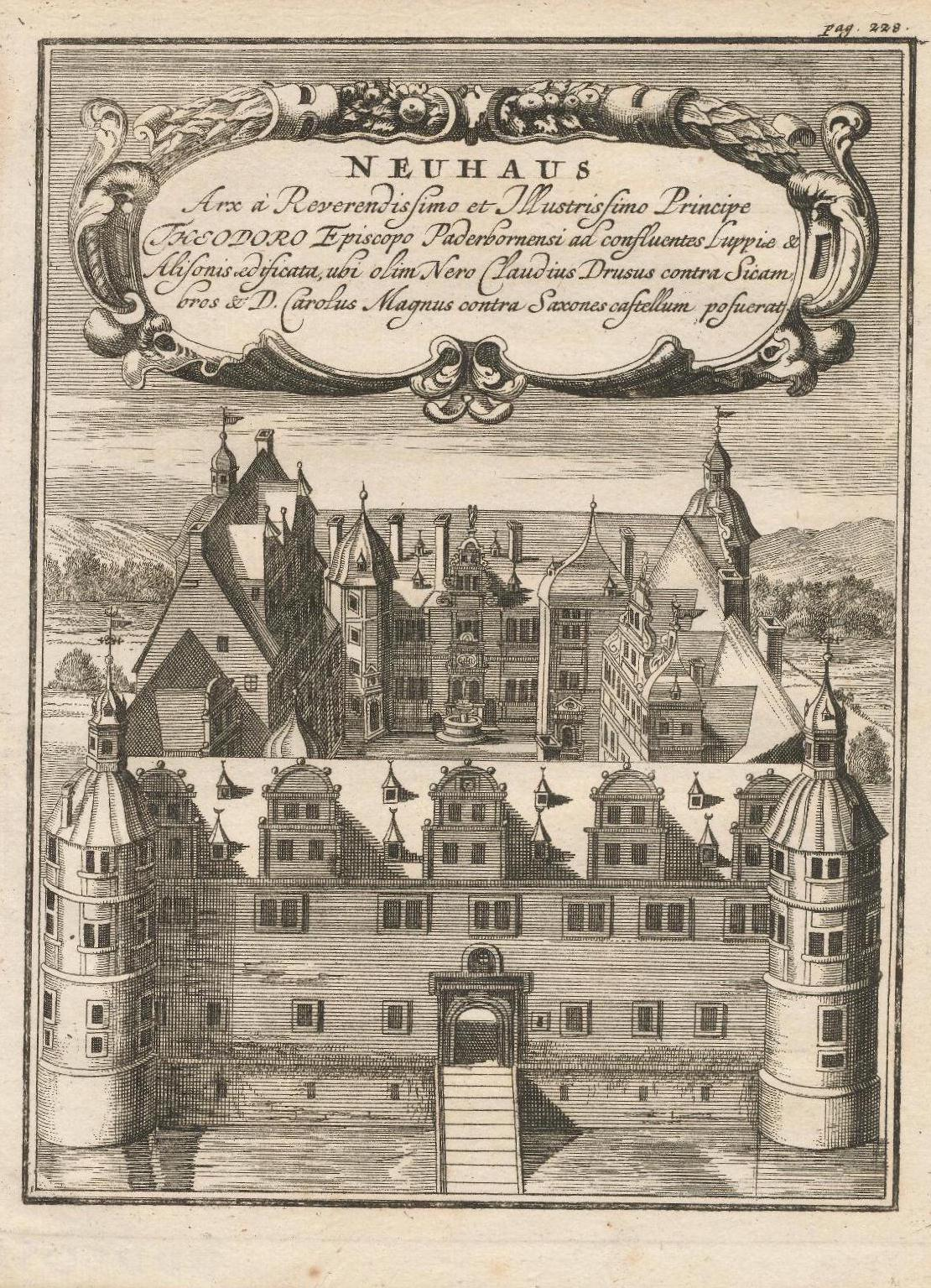
View of Neuhaus castle, 1672 (Monumenta Paderbornensia).

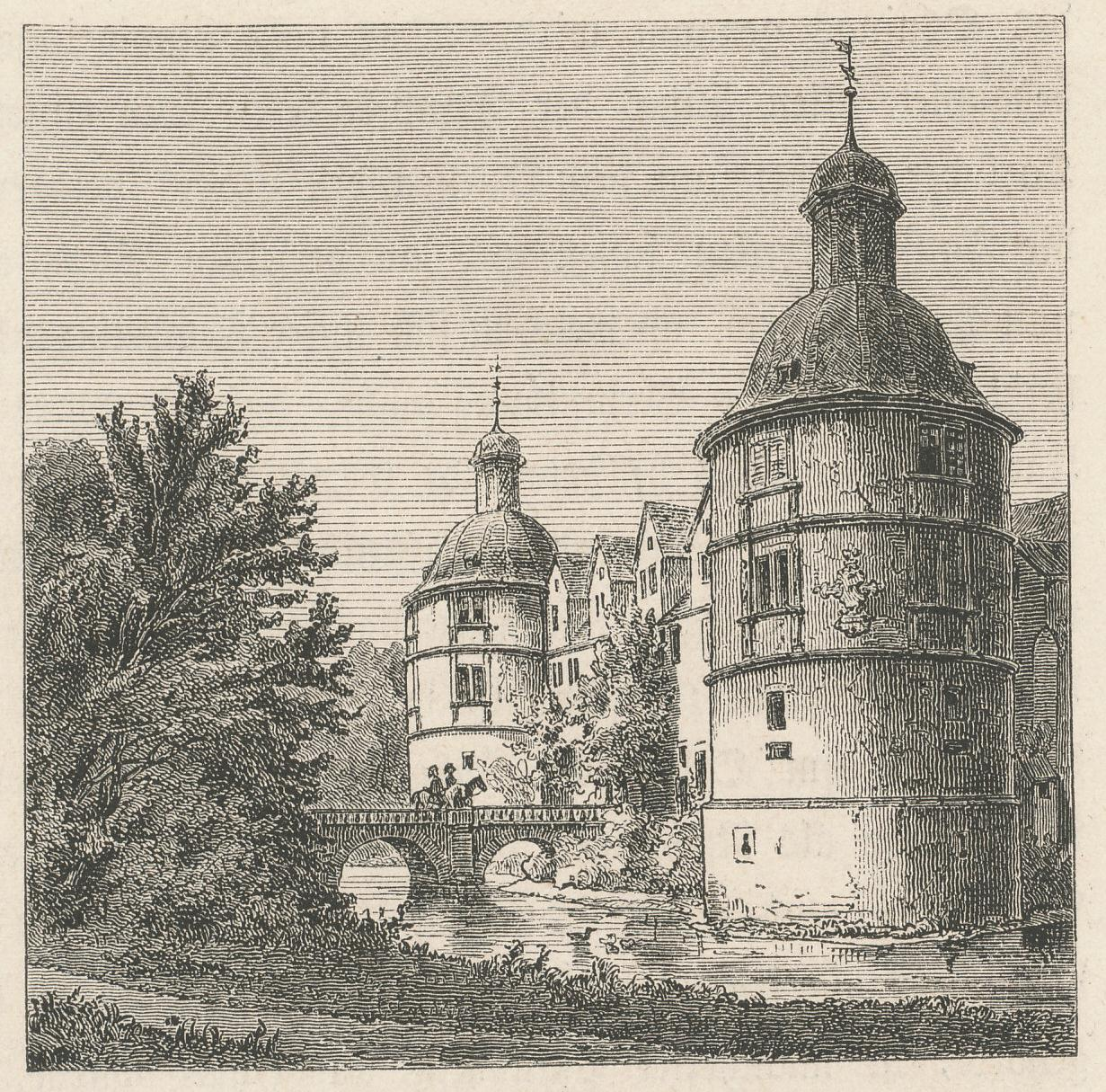
View of Neuhaus castle, 1872 (Das malerische und romantische Westphalen).

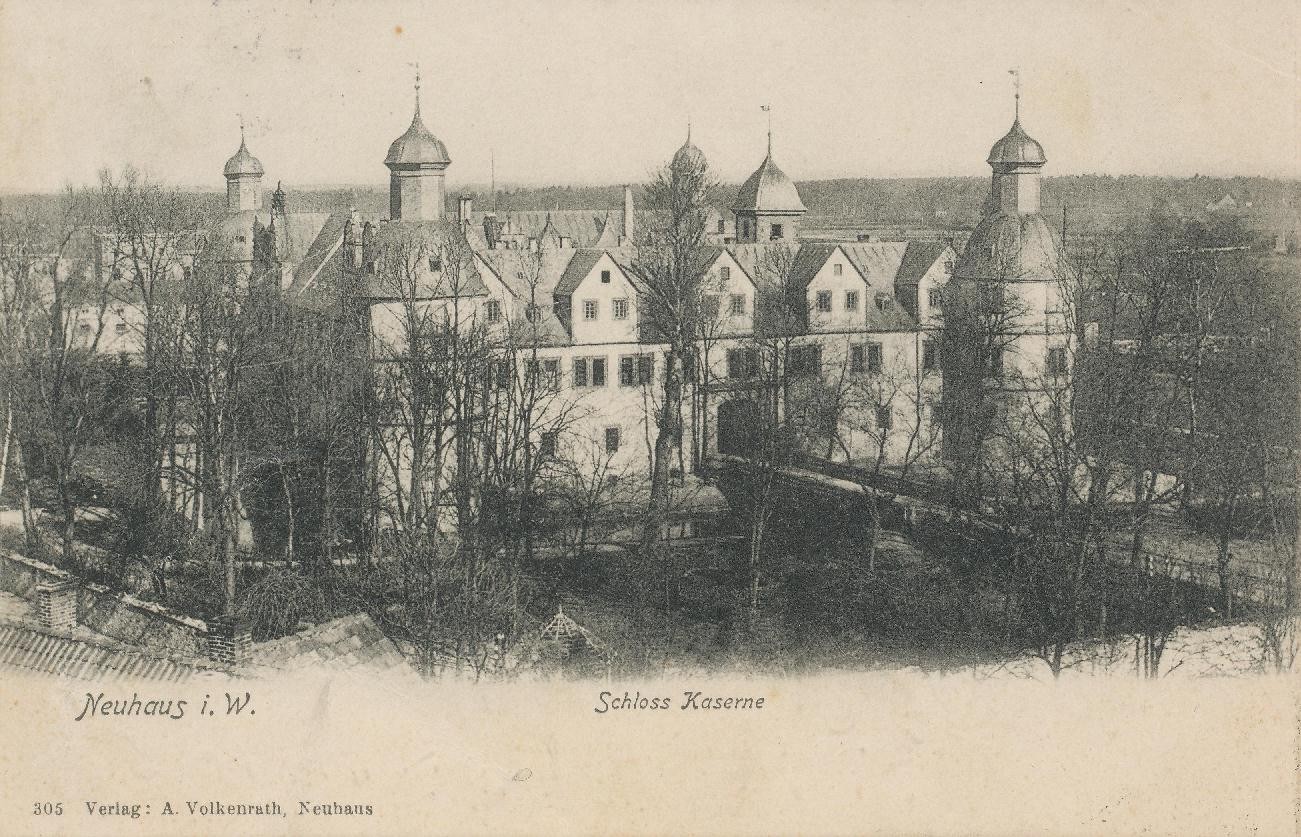
Picture postcard of Neuhaus castle as barracks, 1900.

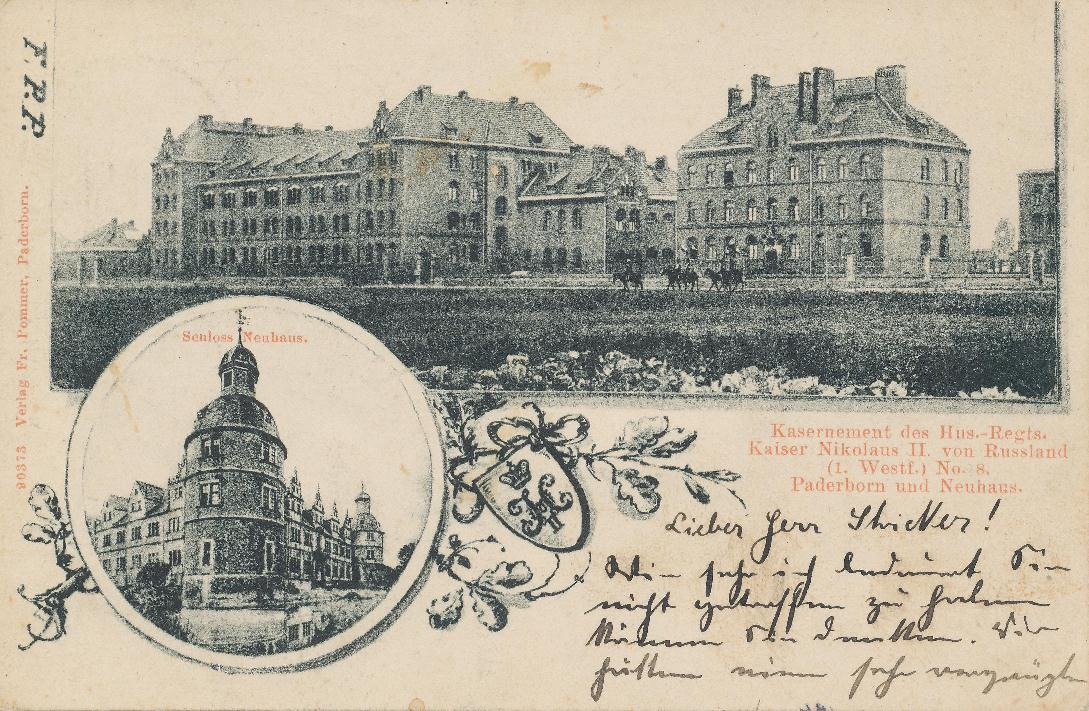
Picture postcard of Neuhaus as barracks for the 8th (1st Westphalian) Hussars "Emperor Nicholas II of Russia", 1906.

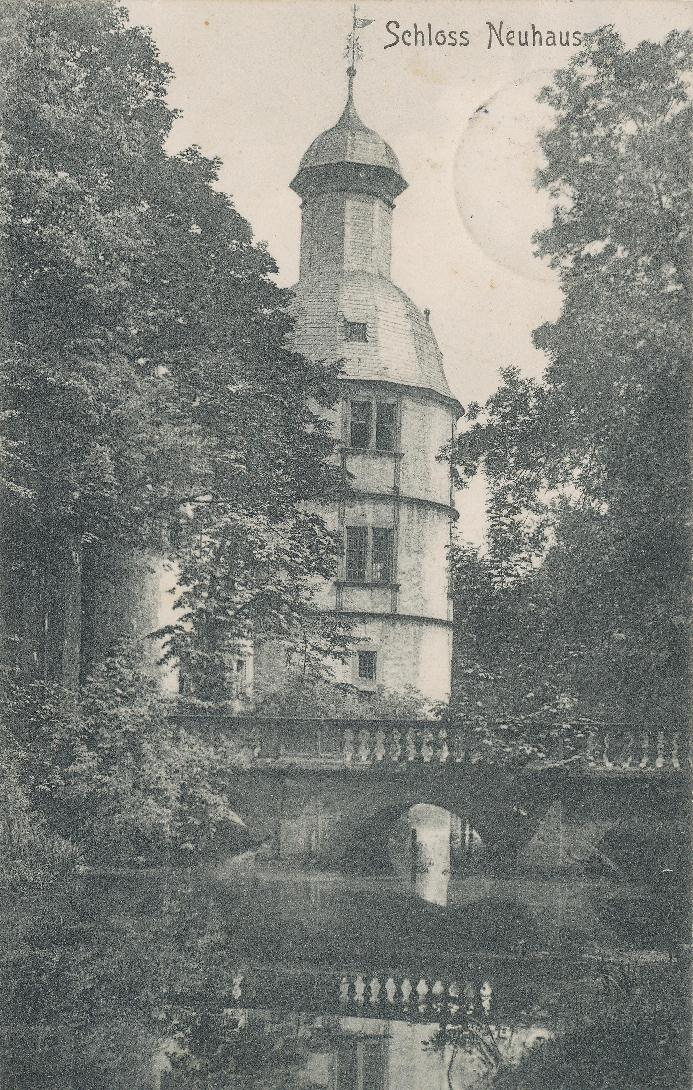
Picture postcard of the castle entrance, 1909.

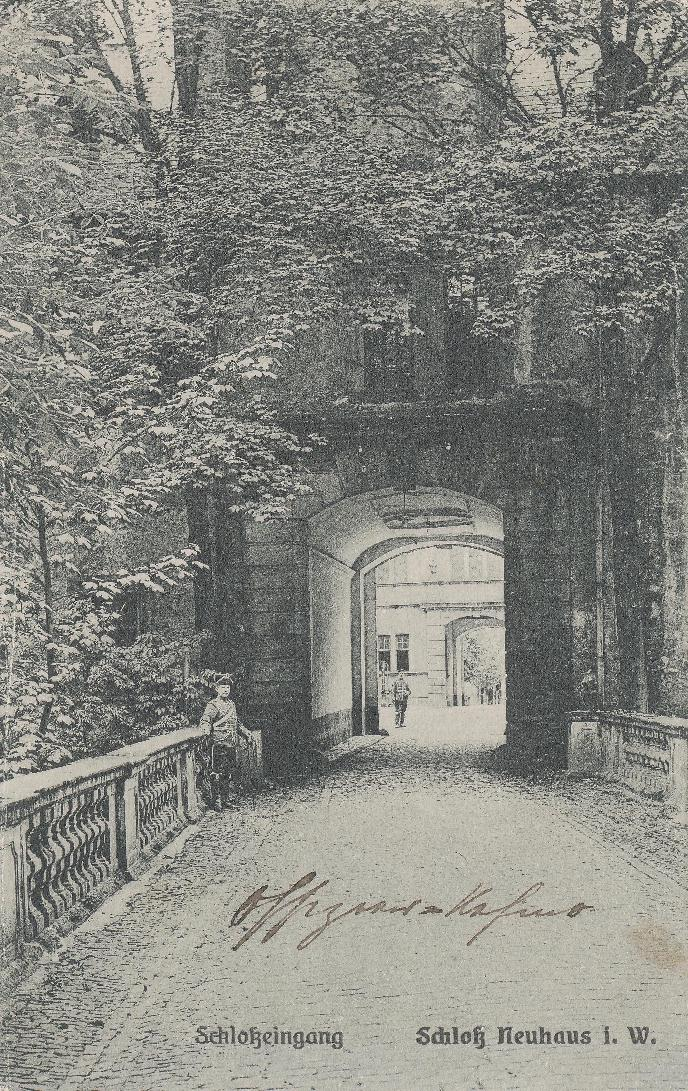
Entrance of the castle at Neuhaus with Hussars of the 8th Hussars, 1911.
