= Sennelager Training Area =

British military training area in Germany

- Senne, North Rhine-Westphalia, Germany
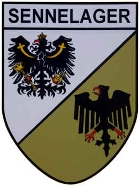
- Sennelager Training Area insignia

Site information
- Type: Military training area
- Owner: German Government
- Operator: British Army
- Controlled by: UK Ministry of Defence

Location
- location in North Rhine-Westphalia
- Coordinates: 51°51′N 08°47′E
- Area: 116 square kilometres (45 sq mi)

Garrison information
- Garrison: British Army Germany

The Sennelager Training Area (German: Truppenübungsplatz Senne) is a military training area in Germany, under the control of British Forces based in Paderborn Garrison. It covers an area of 116 square kilometres (45 square miles), and belongs to the German Government, which discharges its responsibility through its Institute for Federal Real Estate. The area was first used for military purposes at the end of the 19th century. The Field Marshal Rommel Barracks, Augustdorf of the German Army is located nearby.

== Location ==
The training area lies north of Paderborn, on the western edge of the Teutoburg Forest in the middle of the Senne, at a height of between 113 metres (371 feet) and 382 m above sea level (NN). The Stapel Exercise Area in Lage, north of Augustdorf, also belongs to the Sennelager Training Area, and covers some 550 hectares (1,400 acres). The land on which the training area is established falls within the boundaries of the following towns and villages: (clockwise beginning in the north): Augustdorf, Detmold, Schlangen (Lippe), Bad Lippspringe, Paderborn, Hövelhof (Paderborn district), and Schloß Holte-Stukenbrock (Gütersloh district).

== Current and future use ==
The Strategic Defence and Security Review 2010 concluded that the British Forces Germany would close the Sennelager military training area, and repatriate all troops and equipment back to the United Kingdom by 2020.

In November 2021, due to increasing threats of potential hostility from Russia, the British Government updated their stance to reflect the increased level of threat. The defence secretary announced the British Army would return to Germany to form one of three land hubs for the army. The British Army is to base around 250 tanks and armoured vehicles in Germany, to be ready to respond to a potential Russian invasion.

== Gallery ==
Sennelager Training Area
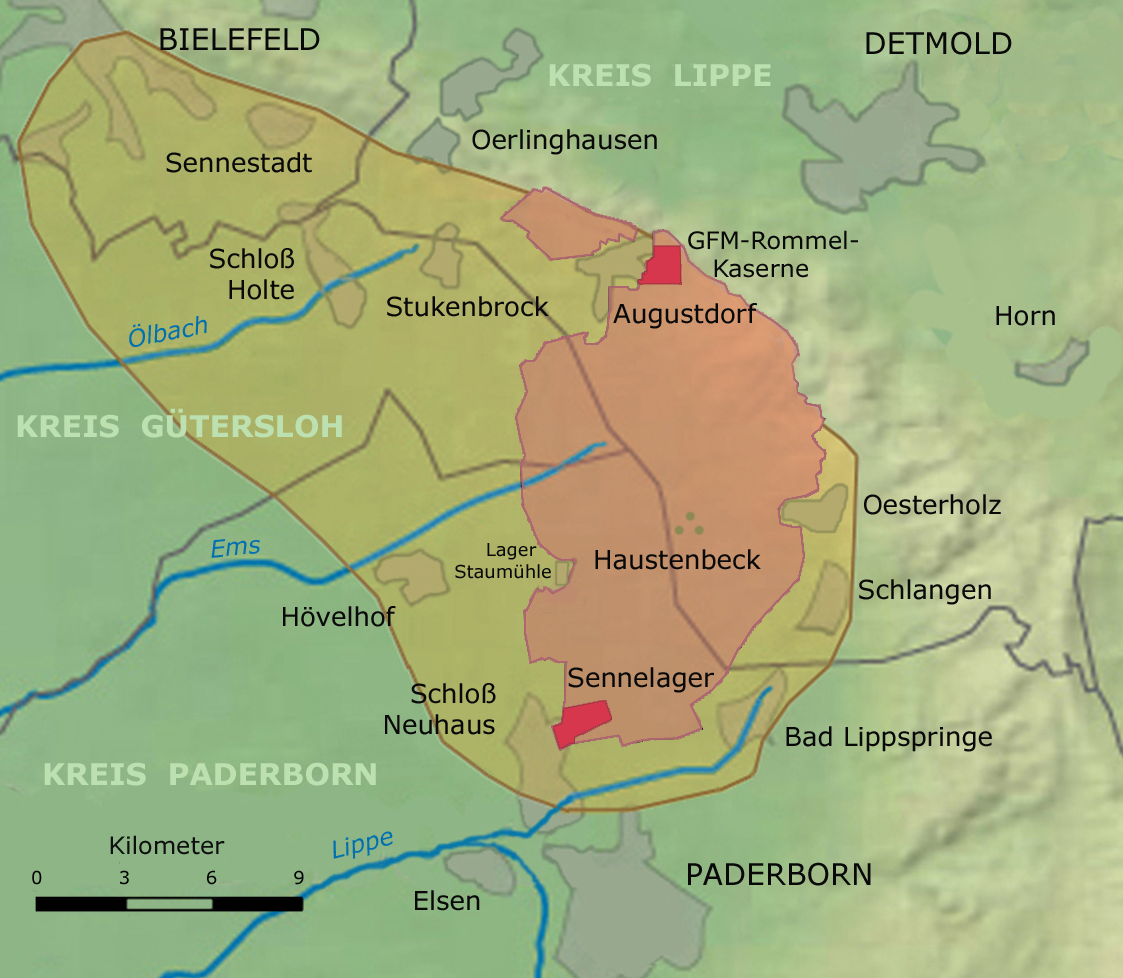
Location of the Sennelager Training Area.

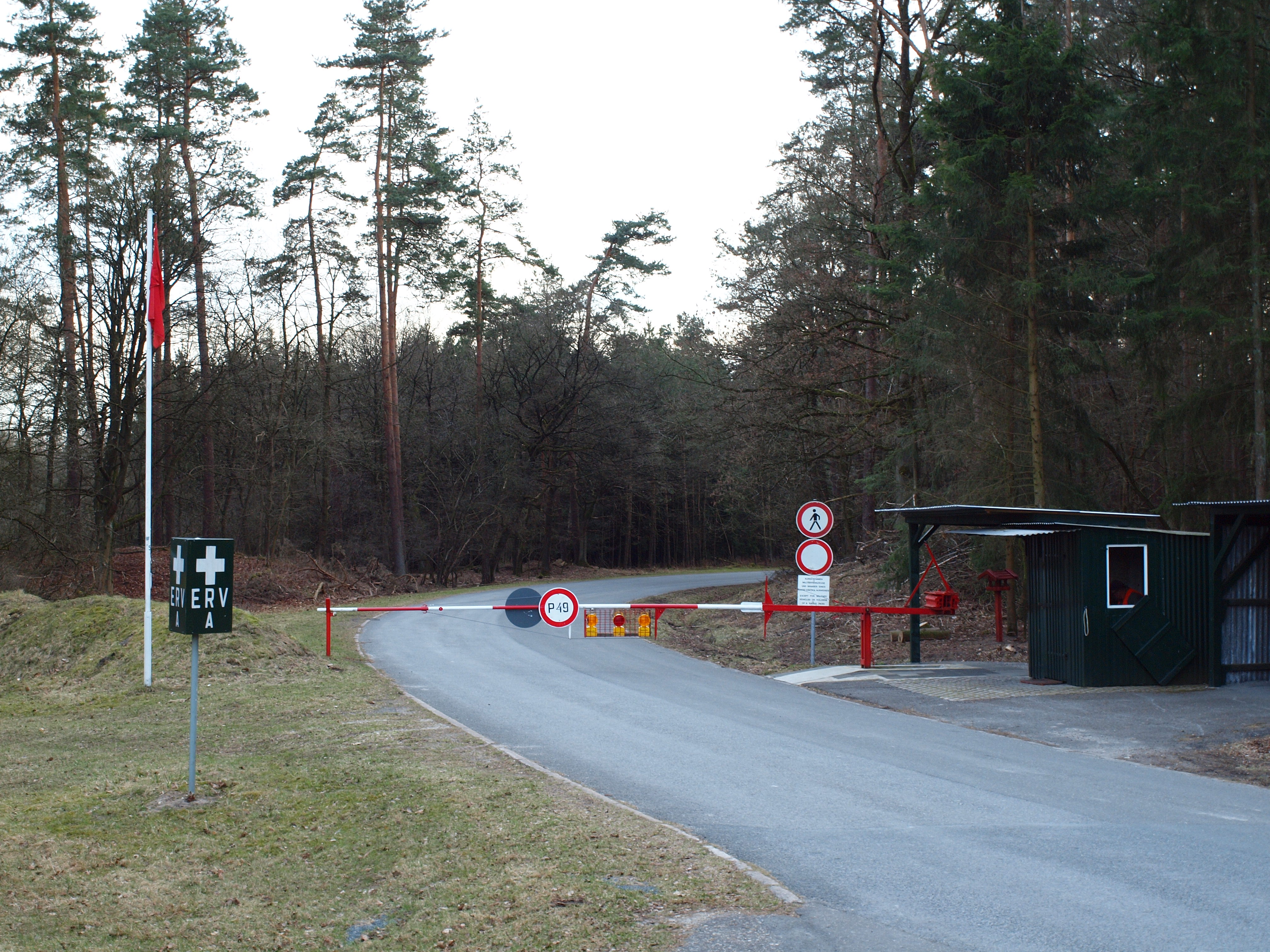
Guardpost with vehicle access control barrier, and red 'danger' flag aloft its flagstaff. The circular signs on the pole to the right indicate 'no pedestrians' (top) and 'no vehicles' (bottom).

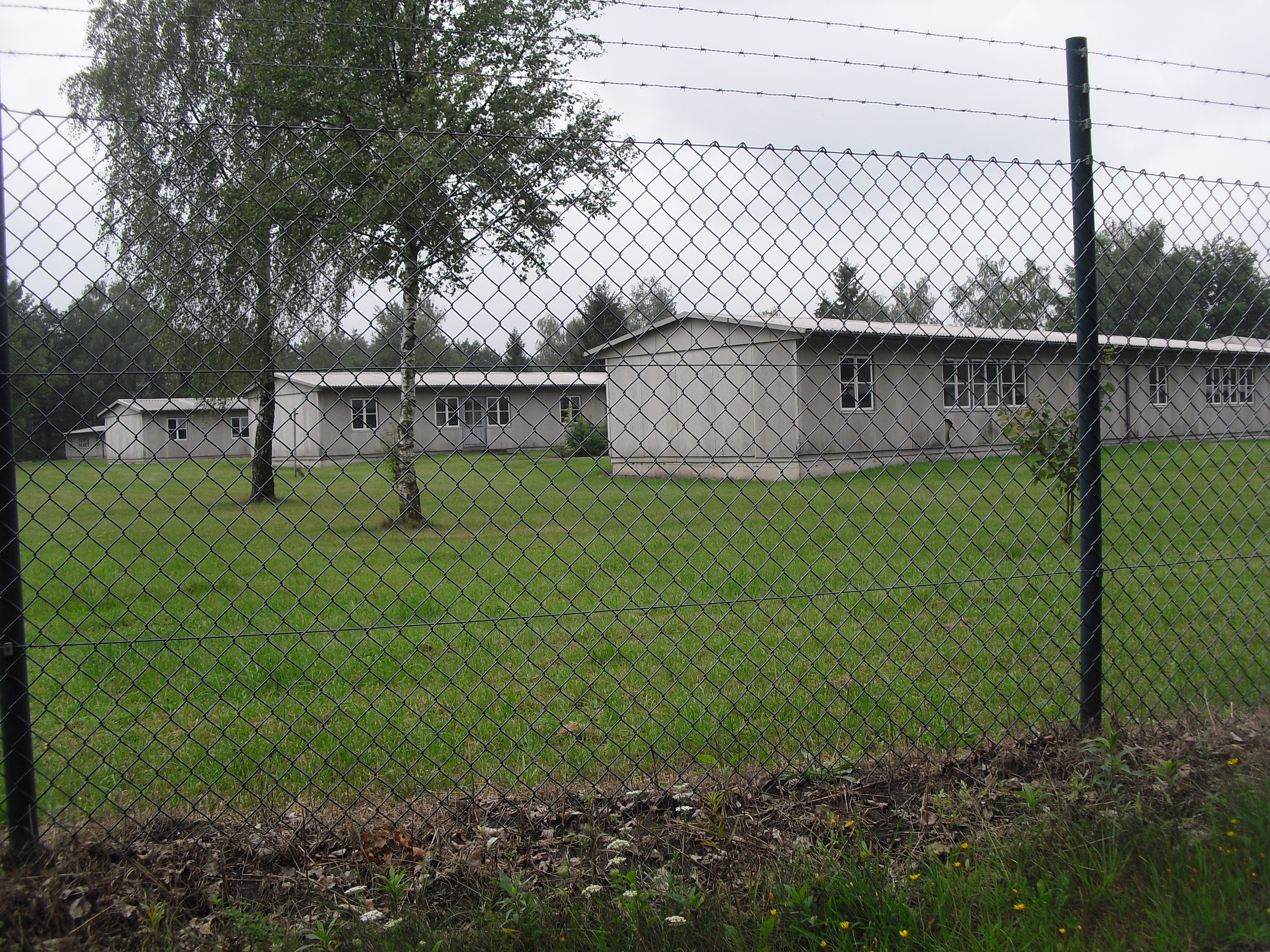
Barracks.

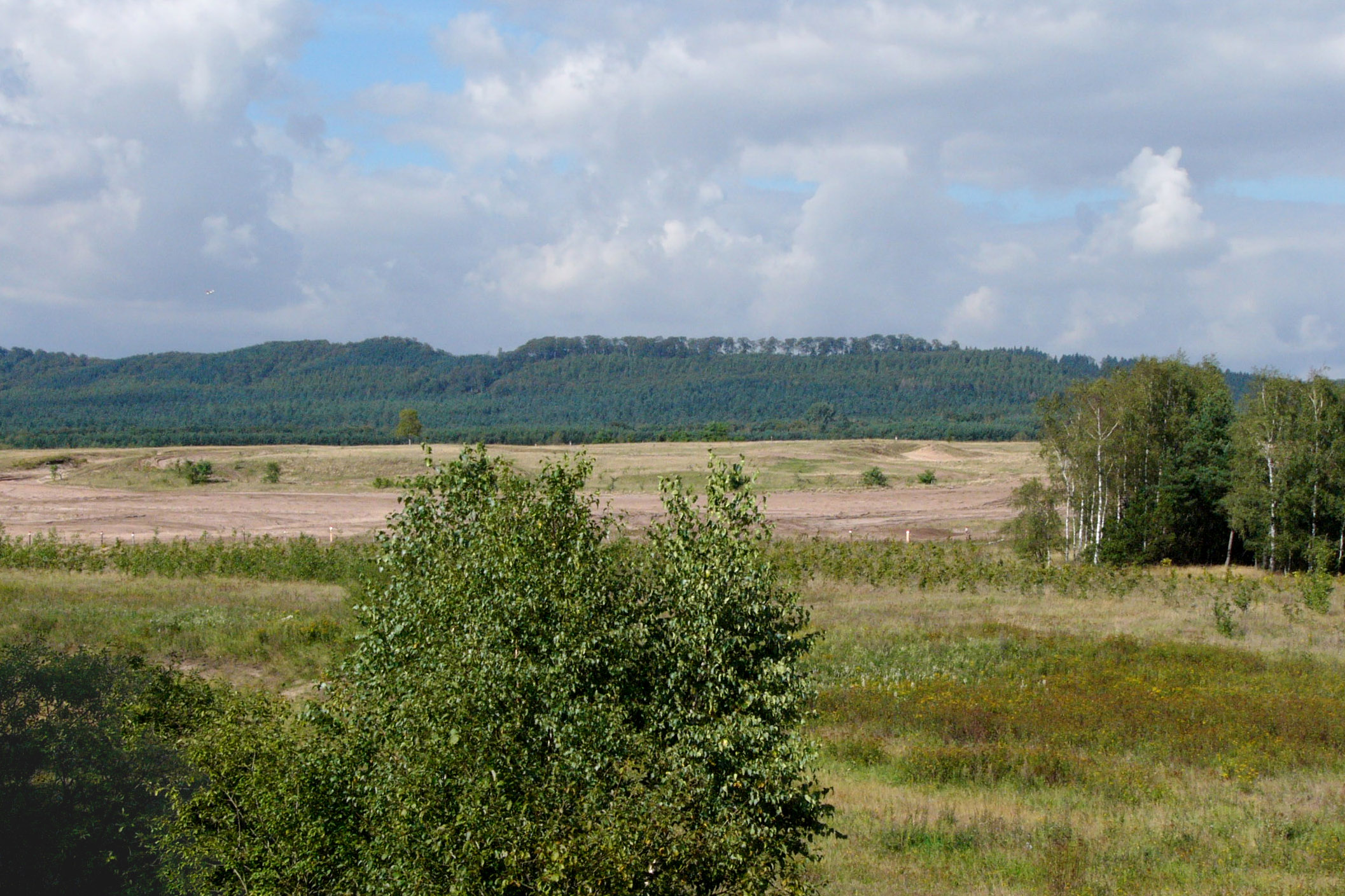
North-western part of the Sennelager Training Area (Stapel exercise area). The Teutoburg Forest is in the background.

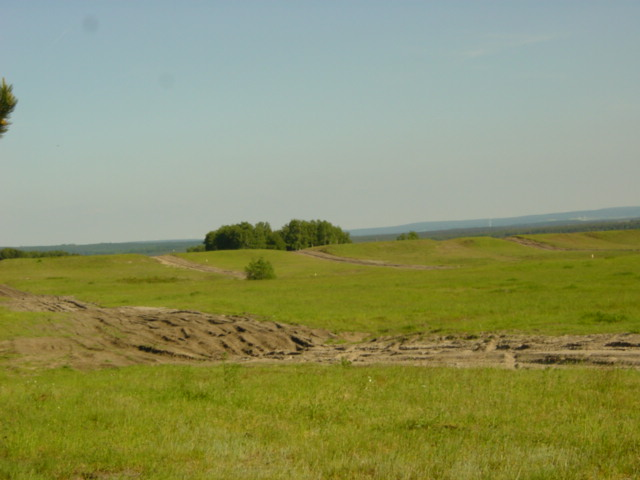
Typical training area landscape: tank tracks can be clearly seen.

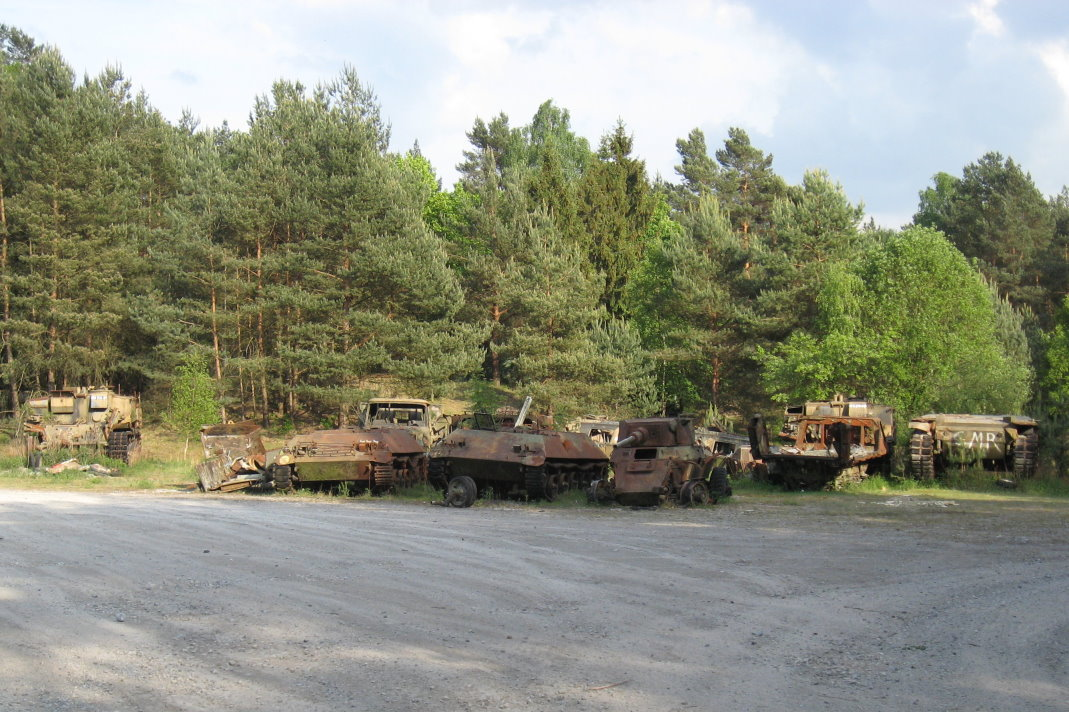
Assorted collection of former target objects.

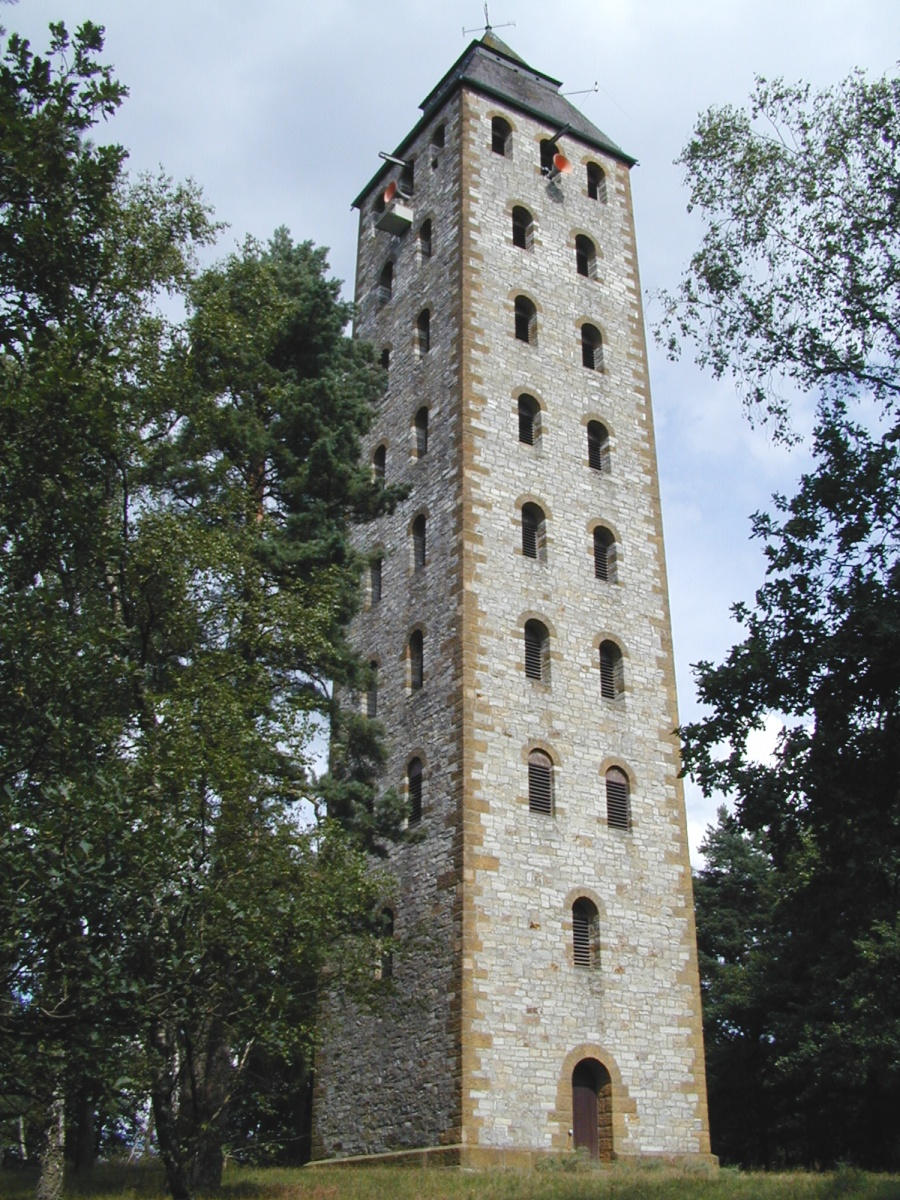
Observation tower.

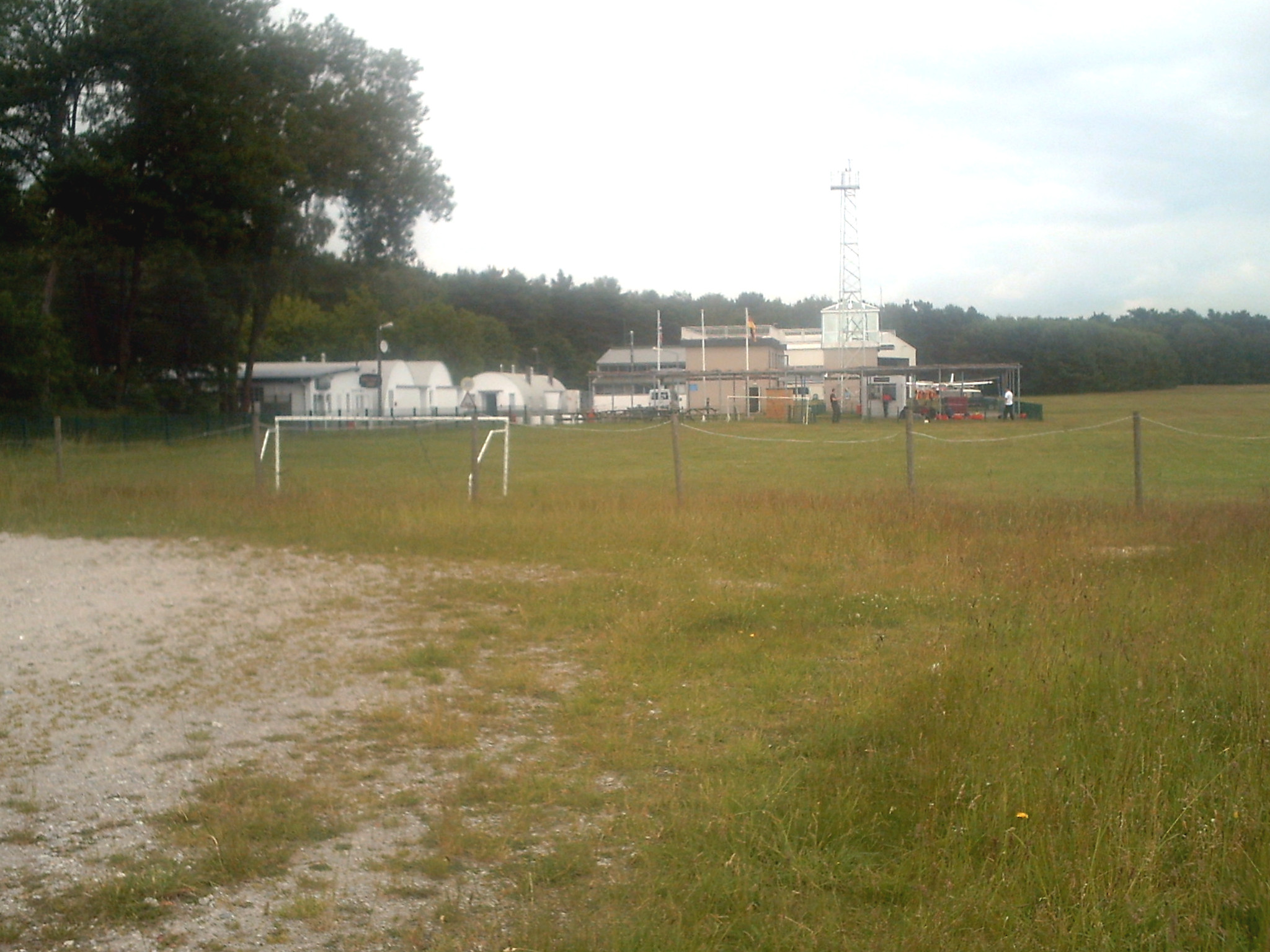
Senne Aerodrome, on the edge of the Sennelager Training Area, north of Bad Lippspringe. This was regularly in use by the Royal Air Force Sports Parachute Association (RAFSPA).

== See also ==
- Westfalen Garrison
  - Barker Barracks
- Category: British Army barracks in Germany
