= Barker Barracks =

Military installation in Paderborn, Germany

- Paderborn
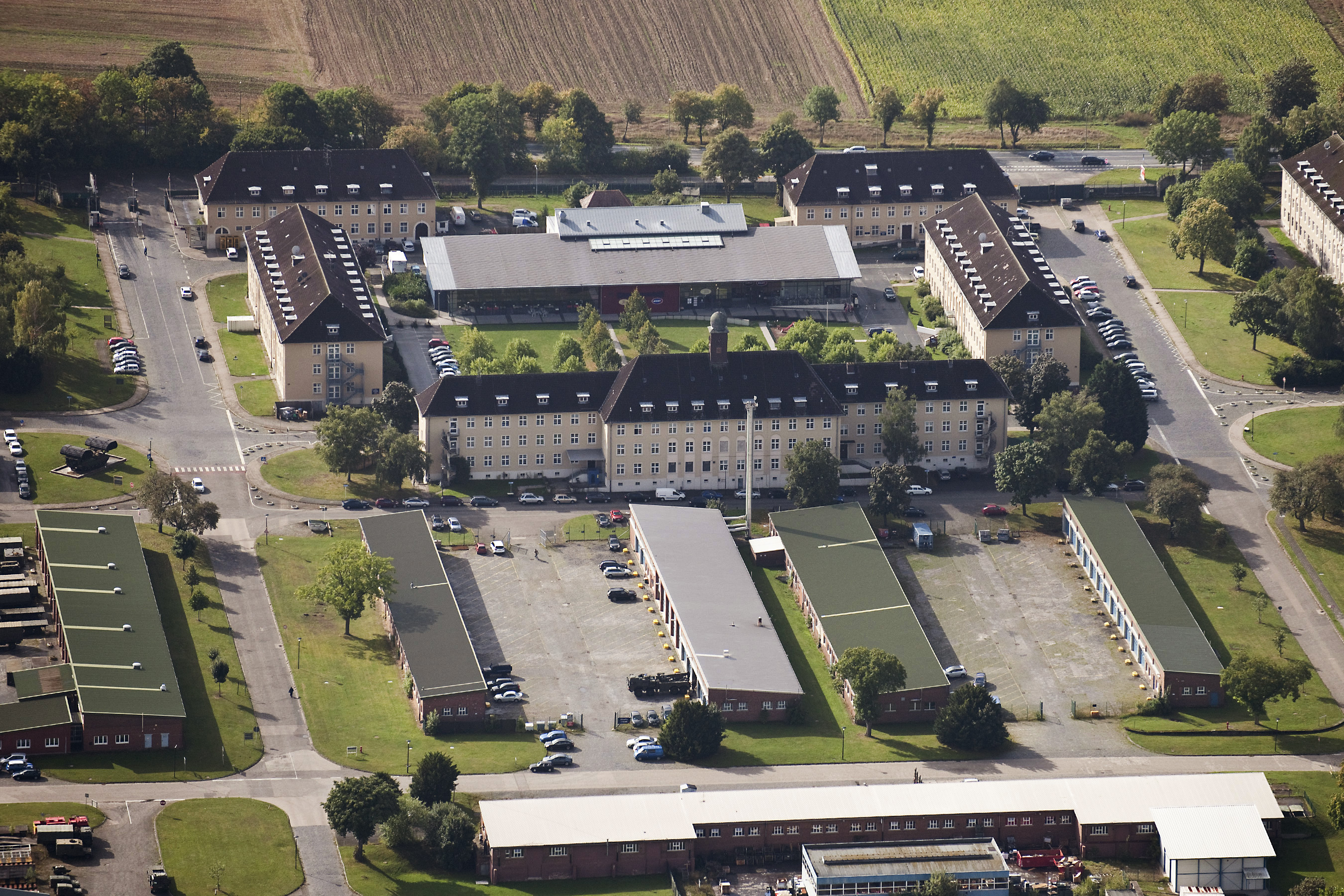
- Aerial view of Barker Barracks

Site information
- Type: Barracks
- Operator: British Army

Location
- Location within Germany
- Coordinates: 51°43′13″N 08°47′09″E

Site history
- Built: 1930s
- Built for: Third Reich
- In use: 1930s – 2019

Garrison information
- Garrison: Westfalen Garrison

Barker Barracks was a military installation in Paderborn, Germany.

== Description ==
Barker Barracks was located in the east of Paderborn, about two kilometres from the city centre. The barracks was bordered by Driburger Straße to the south, the Berliner Ring to the west, Piepenturmweg to the north-west and a rail line to Paderborn railway station to the north-east.

The installation was a typical example of Nazi-era barracks built in the 1930s. The buildings were often three-storey with a high ground floor and two higher floors. The farm buildings were two-storey with higher storey heights for kitchen and dining room use. Separate from these areas there was a technical or a functional area. Here, buildings were built that were specifically needed by the accommodated units, such as halls for motorized vehicles, guns and workshops. In addition, there was a staff building and an officers' mess.

The barracks, with approximately 54 hectares of land, were divided from south to north into three building zones. In the south was the first building zone with ten symmetrical crew quarters in north-south orientation and two buildings in east-west orientation in which the guard and offices were housed. In the second building zone there were also twenty symmetrically arranged buildings, which, like the crew quarters, were set up in north-south orientation. The third building zone in the north consisted of workshops of various sizes as well as maintenance halls, a church and a fuel depot. The crew quarters as well as the guard and the offices formed the main entrance of Barker Barracks.

== History ==
=== Third Reich use ===
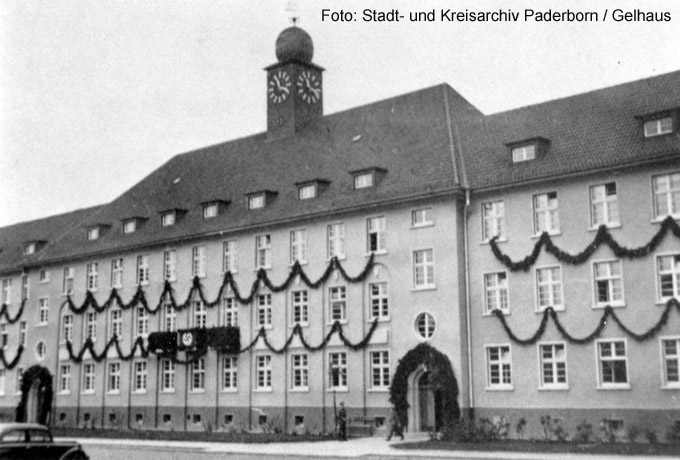
A photograph of the HQ building in Panzer Kaserne Paderborn c1939

Under Wehrmacht control, from the 1930s, the barracks was home to "training and replacement tank battalion 500". The majority of crews for the Tiger tank, to crew the independent German heavy tank battalions, were trained here.

=== British use ===
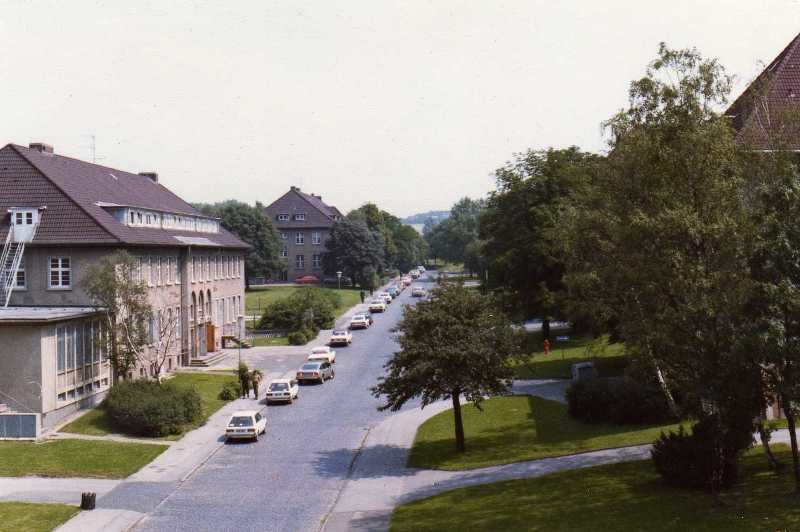
A photograph of a street and buildings inside Barker Barracks c1980. Taken from a high vantage point in the main HQ building it is looking eastwards.

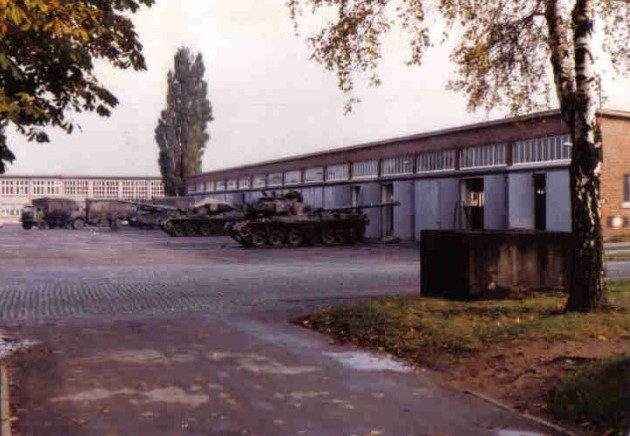
A photograph of A Squadron 3 RTR's tank park inside Barker Barracks c1981. Taken from ground level directly behind the main HQ building it is looking northwards.

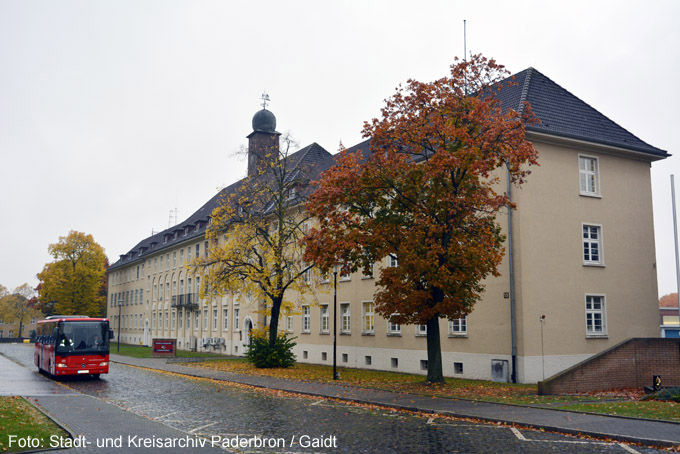
A photograph of the HQ building in Barker Barracks Paderborn c2016. To the right of the building is the memorial wall of 35 Engineer Regiment.

For use by the British Army, the barracks was re-named after General Sir Evelyn Barker. Until 1962, Barker Barracks had been home to only a single British unit. British units stationed in Barker Barracks were:

- Headquarters:
  - Dec 1992 – Aug 2001. 20th Armoured Brigade (moved to Antwerp Barracks, Sennelager)
- Royal Signals:
  - Dec 1992 – Aug 2001. 20 Armoured Brigade HQ & Signal Squadron (200) (moved to Antwerp Barracks, Sennelager)
- Royal Armoured Corps:
  - Dec 1948 – Jul 1951. 5th Royal Inniskilling Dragoon Guards (moved from York Barracks, Munster and then to Talavera Barracks, Aldershot)
  - Jul 1951 – Apr 1959. 8th Royal Tank Regiment (moved from Shaiba Lines, Catterick and then to Wessex Barracks, Fallingbostel)
  - Aug 1957 – Dec 1959. 17th/21st Lancers (moved to Piddlehinton)
  - Apr 1959 – Mar 1964. 10th Royal Hussars (moved from Swinton Barracks, Munster and then to Lucknow Barracks, Tidworth)
  - Feb 1964 – Dec 1966. 13th/18th Hussars (moved from Wessex Barracks, Fallingbostel and then to Cachy Barracks, Perham Down)
  - Dec 1966 – Jun 1970. 14th/20th King's Hussars (moved from Cachy Barracks, Perham Down and then to Aliwal Barracks, Tidworth)
  - Nov 1970 – Jun 1979. Queen's Royal Irish Hussars (moved to Bhurtpore Barracks, Tidworth)
  - Jul 1979 – Nov 1986. 3rd Royal Tank Regiment (moved from Bhurtpore Barracks, Tidworth and then to Allenby Barracks, Bovington)
  - Nov 1986 – Jul 1992. 5th Royal Inniskilling Dragoon Guards (amalgamated with 4th/7th Royal Dragoon Guards, to form The Royal Dragoon Guards)
  - Jul 1992 – Jul 1996. Royal Dragoon Guards (moved to Aliwal Barracks, Tidworth)
  - Aug 1996 – Jun 1999. 1st Royal Tank Regiment (moved to RAF Honington as part of the new Joint NBC Regiment)
- Infantry:
  - Jun 1994 – Jan 1998. 1st Devonshire and Dorset Regiment (moved from Albuhera Barracks, Werl, and then to Battlesbury Barracks, Warminster)
  - Jan 1998 – Feb 2005. 1st Royal Regiment of Wales (moved from Cavalry Barracks, Hounslow and then to Lucknow Barracks, Tidworth)
  - Feb 2005 – 2017. 1st Princess of Wales's Royal Regiment (moved from Burtphore Barracks, Tidworth)
- Royal Artillery:
  - Jan 1962 – Nov 1972. 24 Missile Regiment Royal Artillery (moved from Assaye Barracks, Neinburg and then to Ubique Barracks, Dortmund)
  - Nov 1972 – Jan 1978. 45 Medium Regiment Royal Artillery (moved from Ubique Barracks, Dortmund and then to Haig Barracks, Hohne )
  - Jan 1978 – Apr 1984. 25 Field Regiment Royal Artillery (moved from Dennis Barracks, Munsterlager and then disbanded)
  - Apr 1984 – Jan 1990. 3rd Regiment Royal Horse Artillery (moved from Hopton Barracks, Devizes and then to Kirkee Barracks, Colchester)
  - Jan 1990 – May 1993. 45 Field Regiment Royal Artillery (moved from Kirkee Barracks, Colchester and then disbanded)
- Royal Engineers:
  - Dec 1999 – present. 35 Engineer Regiment (moved from Gordon Barracks, Hameln) (took over buildings from Royal Armoured Corps and then, in Sep 2001, relocated to the HQ building vacated by 20th Armoured Brigade)
- Royal Army Ordnance Corps:
  - Oct 1970 – Apr 1982. 1 (BR) Corps Combat Supplies Battalion RAOC (to be renamed to 5 Ordnance Battalion RAOC)
  - Apr 1982 – Apr 1993. 5 Ordnance Battalion RAOC (moved Princess Royal Barracks, Gutersloh and Tower Barracks, Dulmen) (merged with 6 Ordnance Battalion RAOC to become 6 Supply Regiment Royal Logistic Corps)
- Royal Electrical and Mechanical Engineers:
  - unknown – Apr 1950. REME Technical Training School BAOR (moved to Glamorgan Barracks, Duisburg)
  - circa 1979. 57 Station Workshop REME
  - unknown. 20 Close Support Company REME
  - 1995 – 2007. 3 Battalion REME (moved from Hobart Barracks, Detmold) (to be renamed 3 (Close Support) Battalion REME)
  - 2007 – 2019. 3 (Close Support) Battalion REME
  - 2019. The last remaining troops were withdrawn and the barracks closed.
