= Rheindahlen (disambiguation) =

Rheindahlen may refer to

- Rheindahlen, a town which belongs to Monchengladbach West in the German state of North Rhine-Westphalia
  - RAF Rheindahlen, named after the town
  - JHQ Rheindahlen, also named after the town
