= Royal Air Force Germany =

Former military command formation of the British Royal Air Force

- Royal Air Force Germany badge
- Active: 1 January 1959–1 April 1993
- Country: Germany
- Allegiance: United Kingdom
- Branch: Royal Air Force
- Type: Royal Air Force command
- Part of: British Armed Forces, UK Ministry of Defence
- Headquarters: RAF Rheindahlen
- Nickname: RAFG
- Motto: Keepers of the Peace
- March: Royal Air Force March Past

Royal Air Force Germany, commonly known as RAF Germany, and abbreviated RAFG, was a command of the Royal Air Force (RAF) and part of British Forces Germany (BFG). It consisted of units located in Germany, initially in what was known as West Germany as part of the British Air Forces of Occupation (BAFO) following the Second World War, and later as part of the RAF's commitment to the defence of Europe during the Cold War. The commander of RAFG doubled as commander of NATO's Second Allied Tactical Air Force (2ATAF). Its motto was 'Keepers of the Peace'.

== History ==
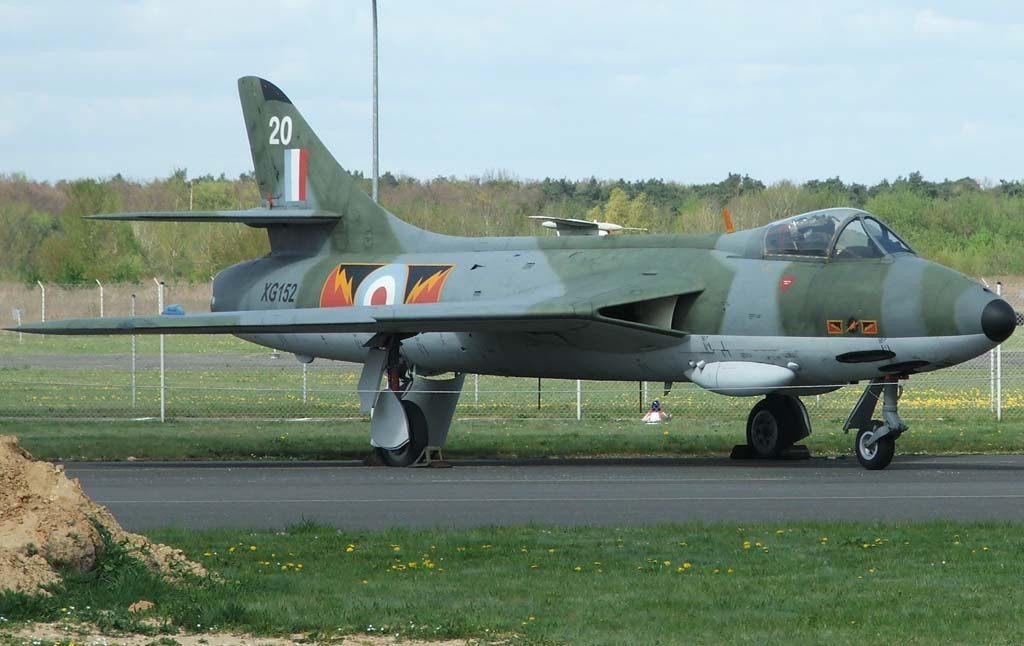
Hawker Hunter F6 in No. 4 Squadron RAF colours at Luftwaffe Museum, Gatow-Berlin.

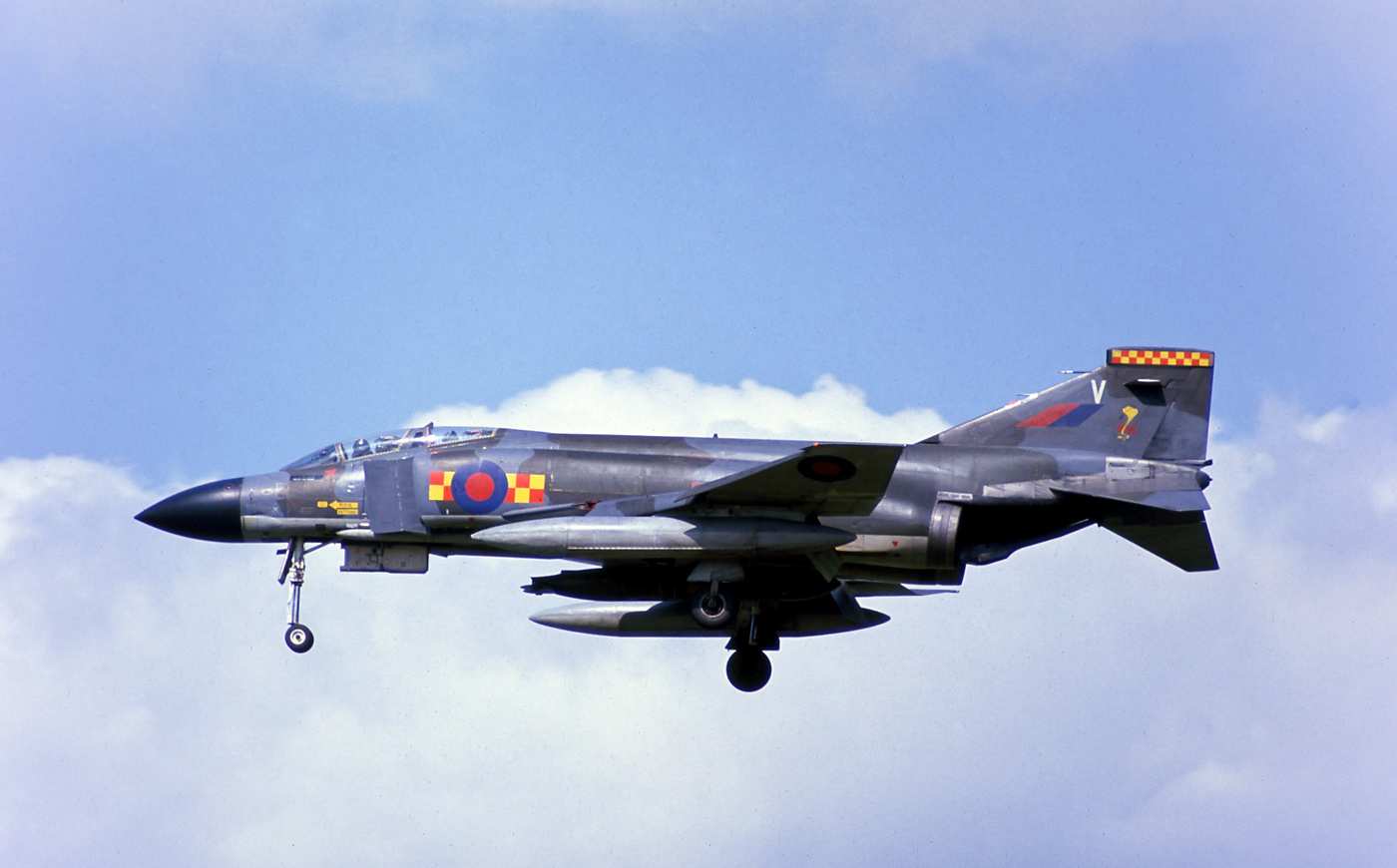
A Phantom FGR2 of No. 92 Squadron landing at RAF Wildenrath in the mid-1980s.

Royal Air Force Germany airbases with flying units in 1989 (all located in North Rhine-Westphalia)
Tornado GR1 Harrier GR5 Phantom FGR2

RAF Germany was established on 1 January 1959, through the renaming of the RAF's Second Tactical Air Force. The command remained based at RAF Rheindahlen with Air Marshal Sir John Edwardes-Jones continuing as its Air Officer Commanding. Flying operations were conducted from six airfields; four of these: Geilenkirchen, Laarbruch, Bruggen, and Wildenrath, were the so-called 'clutch' airfields built earlier in the decade, with the other two, Jever and Gutersloh, having been occupied since the closing months of World War II. The command's stock of aircraft included the English Electric Canberra bomber, Hawker Hunter fighter-bomber, and the Supermarine Swift reconnaissance aircraft.

The command's number of airfields was reduced by one in 1961, when Jever was returned to the West German federal authorities, followed by Geilenkirchen in 1968, and consolidating operations to four RAF stations. In between times, RAFG received a dedicated interceptor force with the arrival of 19 and 92 Squadrons from the United Kingdom with their English Electric Lightnings.

From 1969, RAFG began receiving new equipment befitting its place on the frontline of the Cold War, with the command also reorganising to support one aircraft type at each airbase. Laarbruch became RAFG's home to the Blackburn Buccaneer strike aircraft, operated by XV and 16 Squadrons. Bruggen received the McDonnell Douglas Phantom fighter-bomber operated by 14, 17, and 31 Squadrons, with Wildenrath taking the Hawker Siddeley Harrier and 3, 4, and 20 Squadrons. Gutersloh became home to the two Lightning squadrons, where they were joined in 1970 by the Westland Wessex helicopters of 18 Squadron, while 25 Squadron provided defence for the three clutch bases with the Bloodhound SAM. The exception to this arrangement was II Squadron, who operated their Phantoms in the aerial reconnaissance role from Laarbruch. At this time, the command gained another further squadron when the Communications Flight adopted the identity of 60 Squadron which had recently disbanded in the Far East. The Air Officer Commanding (AOC) of RAF Germany at this time was Dambuster raid pilot Air Marshal Harold 'Mick' Martin.

Further change came with the arrival of the SEPECAT Jaguar in 1975, with the three Bruggen squadrons all converting to the single-seat, twin-engined, strike and ground attack aircraft, and was later joined there by 20 Squadron which moved over from the Harrier. II Squadron would also receive the Jaguar, albeit remaining at Laarbruch in its reconnaissance role.

In 1977, Wildenrath and Gutersloh swapped roles as 19 and 92 Squadrons converted to the Phantom, now redeployed in the air defence role, and moved to Wildenrath to take advantage of their new mounts longer range, with 3 and 4 Squadrons and their Harriers moving east to Gutersloh. 230 Squadron and their Westland Puma helicopters arrived at Gutersloh in 1980 to replace 18 Squadron, who disbanded in preparation to receive the new Boeing Chinook. After re-equipping, and seeing service in the Falklands War, 18 returned in 1983 with both units providing support to the British Army of the Rhine (BAOR).

In 1983, a new shape emerged in the skies over western Europe with the arrival of the Panavia Tornado multi-role strike-attack aircraft into RAF Germany. Entering service with XV Squadron, it was only intended to equip the three Laarbruch-based units, but ultimately replaced the Jaguar across the RAFG command, which also included 20 Squadron moving once more this time to Laarbruch. 1986 saw the arrival of IX Squadron at Bruggen, as well as the end of the nuclear Quick Response Alert duty that RAFG had carried out since its formation. The Jaguar finally left RAF Germany in 1988 when II Squadron replaced theirs with Tornado's fitted with the much-delayed 'Tornado Infra-Red Reconnaissance System' (TIRRS), while the following year 3 and 4 Squadrons began replacing their first-generation Harrier GR3s with the new Harrier II. 25 Squadron disbanded that October, ending nearly twenty years of Bloodhound SAM operation in Germany, with the numberplate transferred the same day to a new Tornado F3 unit at RAF Leeming.

The fall of the Berlin Wall and the collapse of the Warsaw Pact stimulated major changes in British defence policy, and RAF Germany was no exception. The Options for Change paper announced a downsizing of the command; Wildenrath was to close and its Phantom squadrons disbanded, Gutersloh was to be transferred to the British Army and its squadrons relocated to Laarbruch, which in turn would have its three strike-attack Tornado squadrons disbanded.

These proposals were quickly overtaken by events in the Gulf, following the Iraqi invasion of Kuwait. RAF Germany provided the bulk of the Tornado force, with XV (Wg Cdr John Broadbent), 16 (Wg Cdr Ian Travers-Smith), and 31 (Wg Cdr Jerry Witts) providing the main elements at Muharraq, Tabuk, and Dhahran respectively, with personnel drawn from all eight RAFG Tornado squadrons. Three of those; Squadron Leaders Garry Lennox and Kevin Weeks from 16 Squadron, and Flight Lieutenant Steve Hicks from XV Squadron; were killed in action, and the last of over one hundred aircrew lost in service with RAFG units.

Despite the successful service in the Gulf, the Options for Change proposals were carried out. 92 Squadron at Wildenrath was the first to disband in July 1991, followed by 19 in January 1992, and the station itself that April. At Laarbruch, both XV and 16 Squadrons were disbanded during 1991, and II Squadron relocated to RAF Marham. 20 Squadron remained, but disbanded in July 1992, before 3, 4, and 18 Squadrons relocated from Gutersloh later that year, while 230 Squadron had departed for RAF Aldergrove in Northern Ireland that April.

RAF Germany itself came to an end on 1 April 1993, when it was disbanded and redesignated as No.2 Group of Strike Command, with Air Marshal Sandy Wilson as its last AOC. 2 Group was itself subsumed into 1 Group in 1996, with the final withdrawal of forces coming in 2002 following the closures of Laarbruch and Bruggen.

== RAFG structure and flying units in 1989 ==
- Royal Air Force Germany, headquartered at RAF Rheindahlen, doubles as commander of NATO's Second Allied Tactical Air Force
  - 4 Wing, administrative control of RAF Regiment Rapier squadrons based in West Germany (or Federal Republic of Germany - FRG)
  - 33 Wing, administrative control of RAF Regiment Light Armour squadrons based in West Germany
  - RAF Bruggen, FRG
    - No. 9 Squadron, tactical nuclear strike/conventional attack role, 12× Tornado GR1^{note 1}
    - No. 14 Squadron, tactical nuclear strike/conventional attack role, 12× Tornado GR1^{note 1}
    - No. 17 Squadron, tactical nuclear strike/conventional attack role, 12× Tornado GR1^{note 1}
    - No. 31 Squadron, tactical nuclear strike/conventional attack role, 12× Tornado GR1^{note 1}
    - No. 37 Squadron RAF Regiment, air defence, 8× Rapier launch stations
    - No. 51 Squadron RAF Regiment, light armour, 15× Spartan, 6× Scorpion
  - RAF Gütersloh, FRG
    - No. 3 Squadron, 16× Harrier GR5
    - No. 4 Squadron, 16× Harrier GR5
    - No. 18 Squadron, 16× CH-47 Chinook supporting British Army of the Rhine
    - No. 230 Squadron, 16× Puma HC1 supporting British Army of the Rhine
    - No. 63 Squadron RAF Regiment, air defence, 8× Rapier launch stations
  - RAF Laarbruch, FRG
    - No. 2 Squadron, aerial reconnaissance/conventional attack role 12× Tornado GR1A
    - No. 15 Squadron, tactical nuclear strike /conventional attack role, 12× Tornado GR1^{note 1}
    - No. 16 Squadron, tactical nuclear strike/conventional attack role, 12× Tornado GR1^{note 1}
    - No. 20 Squadron, tactical nuclear strike/conventional attack role, 12× Tornado GR1^{note 1}
    - No. 1 Squadron RAF Regiment, light armour, 15× Spartan, 6× Scorpion
    - No. 26 Squadron RAF Regiment, air defence, 8× Rapier launch stations
  - RAF Wildenrath, FRG
    - No. 19 Squadron, 16x Phantom FGR2
    - No. 92 Squadron, 16x Phantom FGR2
    - No. 60 Squadron, Andover CC2 transport planes
    - No. 16 Squadron RAF Regiment, air defence, 8× Rapier launch stations

Note 1: Unit with dual nuclear strike role (with WE.177 tactical nuclear weapons) and conventional attack role (with Air-Launched Anti-Radar Missile (ALARM) & Paveway II and III laser-guided bombs (LGB)).

== RAFG stations and establishments ==
Royal Air Force Germany stations
RAF station	location	dates active	notes / current use
RAF Ahlhorn	Ahlhorn, Lower Saxony	1945 – 1958	originally an aerodrome for German Zepplins, also known as Advanced Landing Ground B.111
RAF Bad Kohlgrub	Bad Kohlgrub, Bavaria	1950s-	site of RAF Germany Winter Survival School (RAFGWSS), see also Langenbruck bus crash
RAF Bruggen	Elmpt, North Rhine-Westphalia	1958 - 2002	following withdrawal of RAF, British Army units relocated here, becoming Elmpt Station, Javelin Barracks
RAF Bückeburg		1946 - 1960	now Bückeburg Air Base
RAF Butzweilerhof	Cologne	August 1951 - 31 January 1967	now residential and retail area
RAF Celle	Celle	11 April 1945 – 29 November 1957	handed over to the Bundeswehr, becoming Celle Air Base
RAF Fassberg	Fassberg, Lower Saxony	April 1945 - 1 January 1957	handed over to the Bundeswehr, becoming Faßberg Air Base
RAF Fuhlsbüttel	Fuhlsbüttel		now Hamburg Airport
RAF Gatow	Berlin	19 August 1945 – 7 September 1994	General-Steinhoff Kaserne and Bundeswehr Museum of Military History - Berlin-Gatow Airfield
RAF Geilenkirchen	Geilenkirchen	May 1953 - March 1968	handed over to the Bundeswehr, now NATO Air Base Geilenkirchen
RAF Gütersloh	Gütersloh	27 June 1945 – 1993	following withdrawal of RAF, British Army units relocated here, becoming Princess Royal Barracks, Gütersloh
RAF Hambühren	Hambühren		communications site
RAF Hehn	Hehn		11 Signals Unit main communications centre for RAFG and BAOR landline communications
RAF Hustedt	Hustedt		B.150
RAF Husum	Husum, Schleswig-Holstein		a remote radar station on the coast near Husum
RAF Jever	Jever	April 1945 - 1961	handed over to the Bundeswehr, now Jever Air Base
RAF Laarbruch	Weeze	March 1945 - 1999	now Weeze Airport
RAF Lübeck	Lübeck	1945 - 1997	also known as RAF Blankensee, now Lübeck Airport
RAF Lüneburg	Lüneburg		now Lüneburg Airfield B.156
RAF Nordhorn	Nordhorn	1945 - March 2001	air weapons range
RAF Nörvenich	Nörvenich	1952-55	handed over to the Bundeswehr, now Nörvenich Air Base
RAF Oldenburg	Oldenburg	???? - October 1957	handed over to the Bundeswehr, now used by the German Air Force
RAF Plantlünne	Plantlünne	9 April 1945 - May 1945	B.103
RAF Rheindahlen	Rheindahlen	October 1945 - December 2013	former RAFG headquarters, now British Forces Germany headquarters
RAF Schleswigland	Schleswigland	1945 - October 1959	handed over to the Bundeswehr, now Schleswig Air Base
RAF Sundern	Sundern	???? - 1961	non flying base, following withdrawal of RAF, British Army units relocated here, becoming Mansergh Barracks, Westfalen Garrison.
RAF Sylt	Sylt	1945 - 16 October 1961	now Sylt Airport
RAF Uetersen	Uetersen	???? - November 1955	from November 1948 to March 1950 it was HQ No. 85 Group RAF, RAF presence until end of November 1955.
RAF Wahn	Bonn		now Cologne Bonn Airport
RAF Hospital Wegberg	Wegberg	1953 - 1 April 1996	HQ British Forces Germany Health Service (BFGHS), now demolished.
RAF Wildenrath	Wildenrath	15 January 1952 – 1 April 1992	now primarily redeveloped into a railway testing centre, operated by Siemens Mobility
RAF Winterberg	Winterberg		former radio navigation unit
RAF Wunstorf	Wunstorf	7 April 1945 - 1957	handed over to the Bundeswehr, now Wunstorf Air Base

== See also ==
- List of Royal Air Force commands
- Royal Air Force station
  - List of Royal Air Force stations
  - List of former Royal Air Force stations
- RAF Regiment
  - List of RAF Regiment units
- Military of Germany (disambiguation)
  - Wehrmacht
  - National People's Army
  - German Air Force

Preceded by Second Tactical Air Force (2TAF)	RAF Germany; 1959–1993	Succeeded by No. 2 Group RAF
