= Langenbruck bus crash =

Bus crash in Germany in 1985

- Location within Germany

Details
- Date: 11 February 1985; 3:09 pm (local time)
- Location: Langenbruck
- Coordinates: 48°38′20″N 11°31′12″E
- Country: West Germany
- Cause: Collision

Statistics
- Bus: 1
- Vehicles: 2
- Passengers: 39
- Crew: 2
- Deaths: 21
- Injured: 18

The Langenbruck bus crash, occurred on 11 February 1985, when a double-decker bus carrying up to 40 musicians from the Band of the Royal Air Force Germany (RAFG), crashed on an autobahn between Nuremberg and Munich. The fatal crash happened near to the village of Langenbruck, 18 miles (29 kilometres) north of Munich, in what was West Germany (now Germany). Twenty-one of the occupants were killed in the crash, which included the driver and one RAF policeman; the other 19 were RAF bandsmen. Six of the military victims were buried in the cemetery in the Rheindahlen Military Cemetery, whilst the others were repatriated back to the United Kingdom. In terms of lives lost, it was listed as the worst bus crash in West Germany for 20 years.

== Accident ==
On 11 February 1985, a bus carrying members of the Band of the Royal Air Force Germany, crashed on the autobahn south of the town of Ingolstadt, between Nuremberg and Munich. One report described how the bus was engulfed "in a sea of flames", when it crashed into the back of a truck carrying over 9,000 imperial gallons (41,000 litres; 11,000 US gallons) of aviation fuel. The band, which was based at RAF Rheindahlen at the time, had been travelling to an engagement at the Royal Air Force Germany Winter Survival School (RAFGWSS) in Bad Kohlgrub, Bavaria, when the crash occurred, resulting in the deaths of 19 musicians, the coach driver, and one Royal Air Force Policeman. Accounts vary, but an official tally detailed that there had been 43 people on the double-decker bus when it crashed. The complement of the band was 42 people, and the bus also included the driver and one RAF policeman, however, one of the bandsmen was ill and had to stay behind. Initially, 24 people had survived the crash, some being unable to escape through a lower deck emergency door which had become wedged shut during the collision.

The bus had appeared to crash into the back of the fuel truck at 3:09 pm local time, at Langenbruck, 18 miles (29 kilometres) north of Munich, and 12 miles (19 kilometres) south of the town of Ingolstadt. The fuel truck started leaking its fuel, on what was said to be an icy highway, and when the fuel truck driver realised he was leaking fuel, he slowed down, however, the bus then slipped on the leaking fuel. The driver of the fuel truck managed to move his vehicle some 500 yards (460 metres) away, so that the rest of the fuel would not ignite. Witnesses recalled seeing "one man who was burned to the bone all over his upper body", and having to restrain those in shock to prevent them running off down the autobahn. The bodies of those who had died in the crash, were removed on 13 February and returned to RAF Hospital Wegberg. Eighteen had died in the immediate crash, with three more dying in hospital afterwards. Due to the severe nature of the burns on the victims, some of those who had died had to be identified by their dental work. After a short ceremony at RAF Wildenrath, some of the dead were flown to RAF Lyneham in Wiltshire on 19 February, whilst some families opted to have their deceased relatives buried in the Rheindahlen Military Cemetery. The incident was later stated to be the worst loss of life in a bus crash in West Germany for 20 years. In 1966, 33 people died when their bus crashed on the road between Frankfurt and Cologne.

== Inquest ==
An inquest was opened on 16 August 1985 at Swindon, in Wiltshire, which recorded death by misadventure on 14 of the victims. The other seven victims, including the coach driver, were buried in Germany, so were outside the remit of British coroner's inquests and sheriff's inquiries. An inquiry stated that the truck driver was not to blame in any way, and that the coach driver may have lapsed into a micro-sleep, as he appeared to just drive into the rear of the fuel truck. Nineteen of the victims died immediately, with two dying afterwards from inhalation of poisonous fumes.

== Aftermath ==
By April 1986, the Band of the Royal Air Force Germany was back to full strength and undertaking musical appointments.

The motor industry, and some in the European Parliament, called for flammable liquids not to be transported when roads are icy. Dutch police were given permission to stop foreign drivers with flammable loads entering the Netherlands if the road conditions were bad. The question of the safety of the vehicle was also discussed in Germany, which had many Neoplan double-decker coaches of the type involved in the crash. The plug doors were sealed hydraulically, which led to the doors being hard to open, and the top deck of the bus did not have any emergency exits whatsoever.
