= Intelligence & Security Group (Germany) =

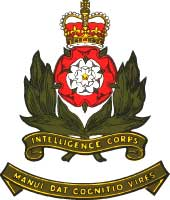
- Badge of the Intelligence Corps
- Active: 1965-1993
- Allegiance: United Kingdom
- Branch: British Army Intelligence Corps
- Role: Intelligence and Security
- Size: Battalion structure with HQ and six companies
- Garrison/HQ: JHQ Rheindahlen and elsewhere in BAOR
- Motto: Manui Dat Cognitio Vires (Knowledge Gives Strength to the Arm) (Latin)
- Colors: Cypress Green, French Grey and Scarlet
- March: The Rose and Laurel
- Engagements: 71 Intelligence Section and other Group personnel deployed on Operation Desert Storm in 1991. Group personnel also deployed to the Former Republic of Yugoslavia on Operation Grapple (UNPROFOR) missions.

Commanders
- Ceremonial chief: The Duke of Edinburgh

Intelligence and Security Group (Germany) (abbreviated as Int & Sy Gp (G)) was an Intelligence Corps unit grouping of a number of intelligence and security companies based throughout the British Army of the Rhine (BAOR). There were other similar units located in Mainland Great Britain and Northern Ireland.

Originally formed in 1965 Int & Sy Gp (G) would be re-titled 1 Military Intelligence Battalion in November 1993, but it remained headquartered in JHQ Rheindahlen but with a lesser number of intelligence and security-roled companies. Prior to the formation of the Group HQ Intelligence Corps Germany HQ was located at 52 Gnisenau Strasse in Mönchengladbach. In 1964 the headquarters was relocated to the BSSO (G) Block inside the JHQ secure compound at the Rheindahlen Military Complex.

== Organisation of Sub-units ==
Int & Sy Gp (G) had its headquarters alongside the JHQ Rheidahlen, it originally had five role-specific companies, but this grew to six; which were deployed as follows:

- 2 Intelligence Company - Rheindahlen and other section locations in the BAOR area
- 3 Intelligence and Security Company - Stadium Barracks, West Berlin (British Sector)
- 4 Security Company - Düsseldorf (with security sections deployed to British garrisons in North Rhine Westphalia and logistic support facilities in the Low Countries)
- 5 Security Company - Hannover (with security sections deployed to British garrisons in Lower Saxony)
- 6 Intelligence Company (Photographic Interpretation) - JHQ Rheindahlen
- 7 Intelligence Company - Bielefeld (with intelligence sections and detachments deployed to 1 British Corps, divisional and brigade headquarters).

== Commanding officers ==
Commanding officers have included:

- Lieutenant Colonel Ralph Dodds - who set up Int & Sy Gp (G) in 1965
- Lieutenant Colonel Terence Arthur Cave CBE 1968-1970

== The Group Restructured ==
In November 1993 Int & Sy Gp (G) was retitled 1 Military Intelligence Battalion as part of an army-wide review of intelligence and security support. This new intelligence unit would eventually relocate from Rheindahlen to the UK and become part of 1 Intelligence, Surveillance and Reconnaissance Brigade.
