= RAF Hospital Wegberg =

Royal Air Force Hospital Wegberg
- Royal Air Force, part of Ministry of Defence (UK MoD)
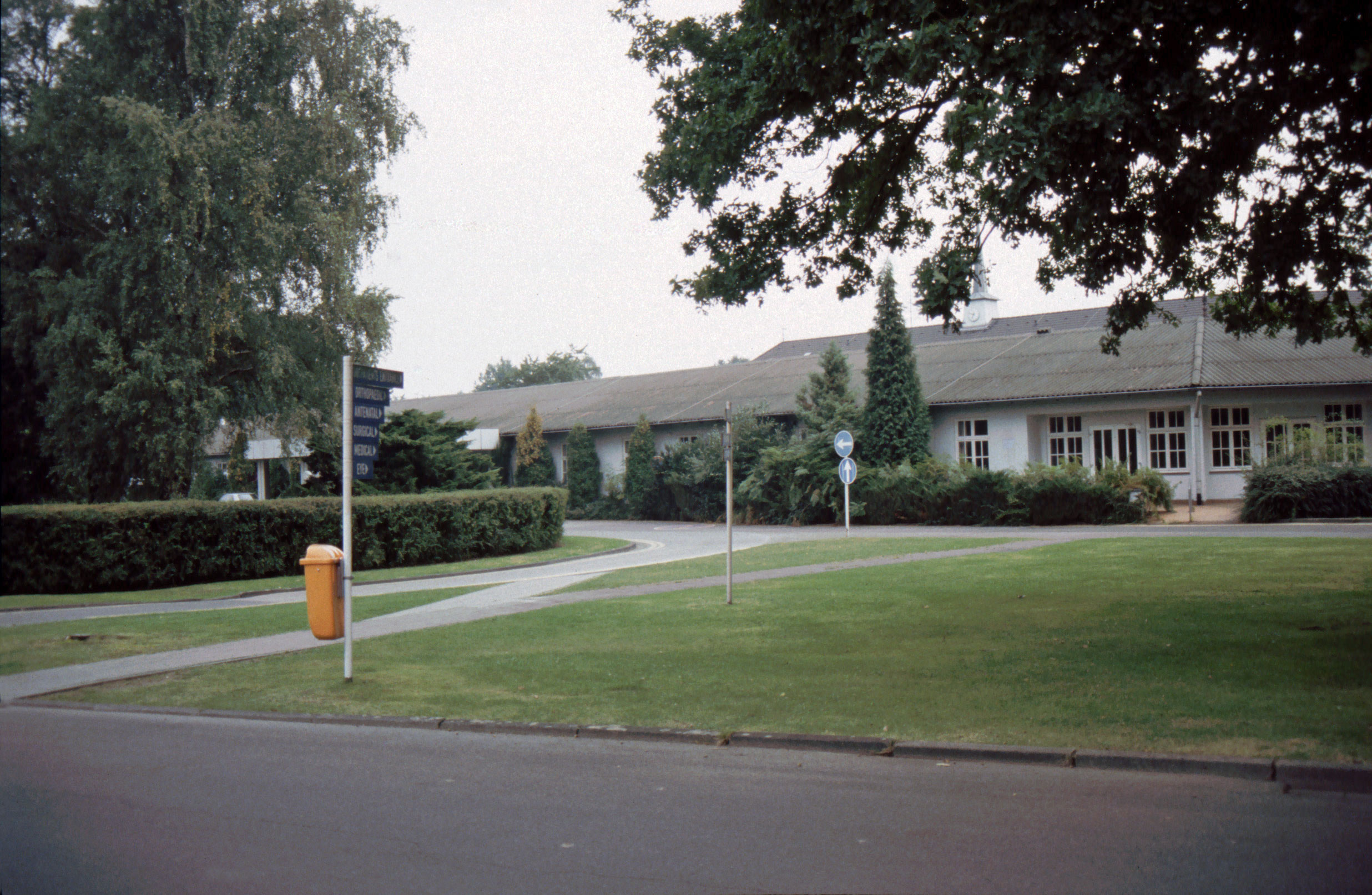
- The front of RAF Hospital Wegberg, September 1998.

Geography
- Location: Wegberg, Mönchengladbach, North Rhine Westphalia, Germany
- Coordinates: 51°09′26.21″N 6°18′19.81″E

Organisation
- Care system: British Forces Germany
- Type: Military hospital
- Affiliated university: Guy's and St Thomas' NHS Foundation Trust, London
- Network: RAF Medical Services

History
- Constructed: February 1953; 73 years ago
- Opened: 1 November 1953; 72 years ago
- Closed: 1 April 1996; 30 years ago

Links
- Website: RAF(H) Wegberg
- Lists: Hospitals in Germany

The former Royal Air Force Hospital Wegberg, commonly abbreviated to RAF(H) Wegberg, was a Royal Air Force (RAF) military hospital located in Wegberg, near the city of Mönchengladbach, in the then West Germany. It was opened in 1953 to serve the British Armed Forces personnel already in the area, and in anticipation of the construction and opening of the large RAF Rheindahlen base, nearby.

== Construction and opening ==
Construction of the hospital commenced in February 1953; 73 years ago by No 5357 Airfield Construction Wing of the Royal Air Force, and it was completed in only 111 days on 31 May 1953; 73 years ago. The hospital opened to patients on 1 November 1953; 72 years ago. The official opening ceremony was held on 16 November 1953, when Lady Foster, wife of the Commander in Chief of 2nd Tactical Air Force, unveiled a tablet in the main entrance hall.

The hospital was built in a unique manner. There was an outer wide U-shaped ring of single-storey buildings, and an inner U-shaped ring of two-storey buildings. They could be described as one horseshoe within another. The outer ring mostly consisted of wards, outpatients and clinical areas, while the inner mostly contained the administrative and support services and a central kitchen area. They were connected by radial and spoke corridors that, with other areas, could be converted into wards in the event of major emergencies or conflict. The psychiatric ward, boiler house, stores, messes, single personnel accommodation, and married quarters were separate from the main hospital building. A one-way ring road encircled the main building, with a north entrance from RAF Rheindahlen, and a south entrance from Wegberg town.

== Patients ==
The hospital functioned as a general hospital for the British military personnel, associated British civilian support staff, and their families, from all services of British Forces Germany (BFG), over a wide area of North Rhine Westphalia, the Netherlands, and Belgium. In one year, the hospital maternity ward could deliver up to 1,000 babies, while other wards had an in-patient number of 6,000 per year, and out-patient of 32,000 during the peak years of activity. Intensive care facilities and a special care baby unit were added. During the 1990 Gulf War, forces members of the hospital were detached to serve in the Middle East, which strained hospital numbers so much so that they had to recruit civilian nurses and staff to fill the void. All detached members returned safely.

In March 1972, the celebrated Rugby Union player Cliff Morgan had a severe stroke in Cologne after commentating on a match for BFBS. He spent three weeks in RAF Hospital Wegberg, and spoke very highly of his treatment there.

== History and reduction of facilities ==
Hospital facilities were temporarily disrupted in June 1980, by extensive damage caused by the explosion of a propane cylinder in the dental laboratory. In January 1987, the hospital was forced to close to all except emergency admissions when severe winter temperatures led to burst water pipes. In September 1987, the roof of the postnatal ward was severely damaged by a blaze accidentally caused by workmen.

The School of Nursing closed in 1984, having provided a large part of the training of both Enrolled (SEN) and State Registered Nurses (SRN) who studied there. Student nurses from RAF Hospitals in the UK were detached to Wegberg, especially for training in obstetrics.

From 1992, British Government economies dictated the number of beds being reduced from 171 to 90, with the closure of the paediatric and special care baby units in December 1992, and in 1993, the combination of the medical and surgical wards and the closure of the maternity unit.

== Closure ==
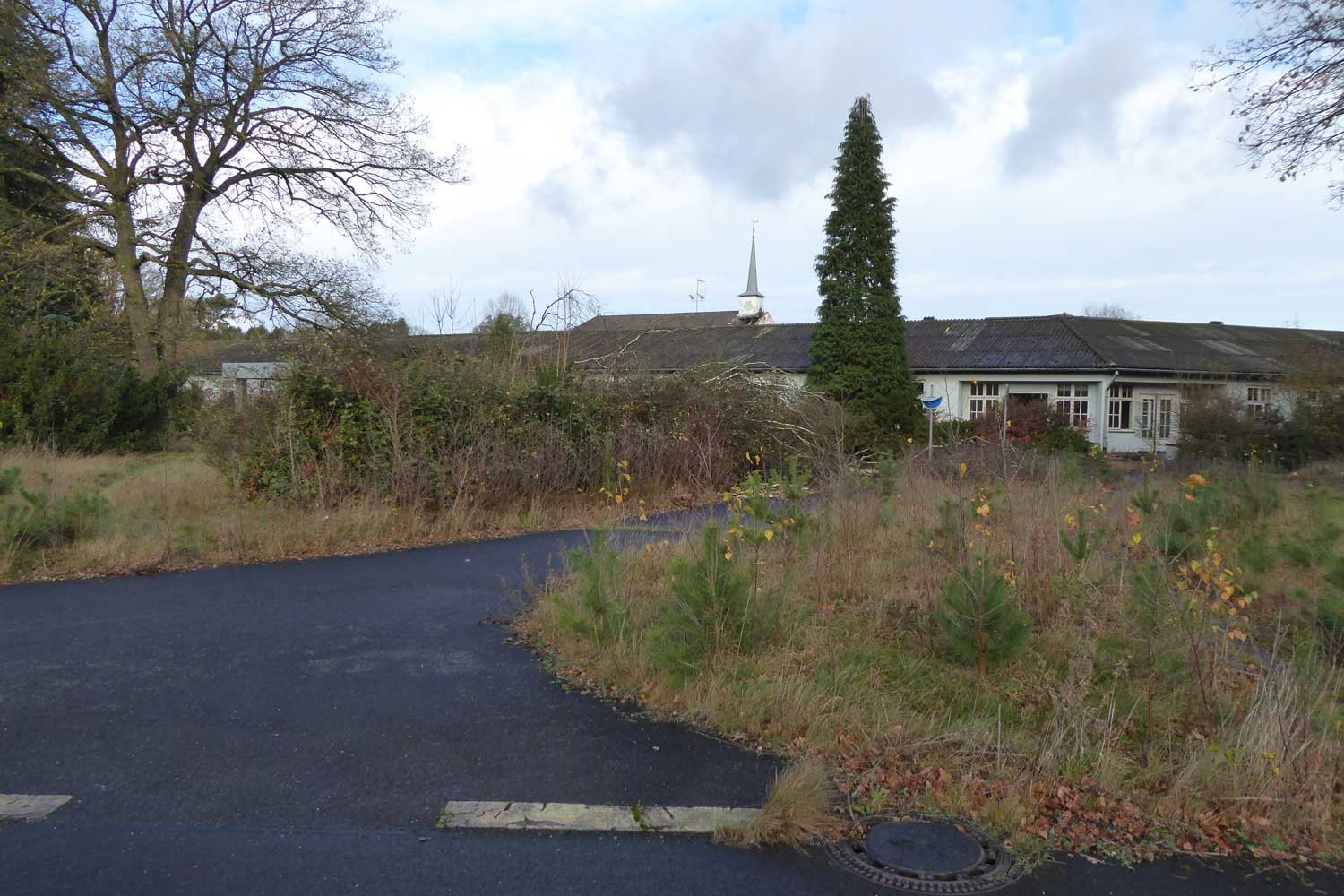
View of the front of the former RAF Hospital Wegberg in November 2015

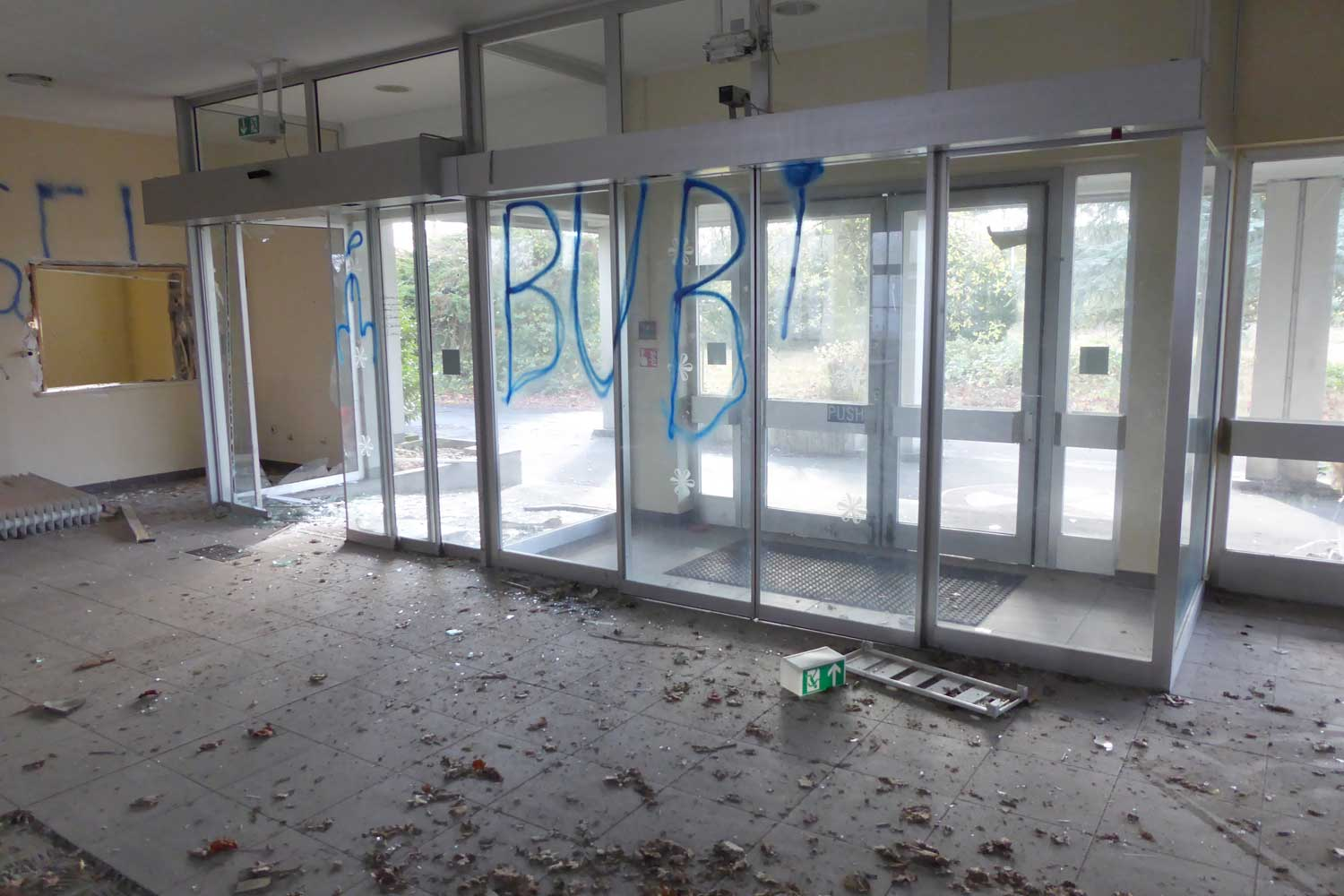
The reception hall of the former RAF Hospital Wegberg in November 2015

RAF Hospital Wegberg closed after 43 years as a general hospital, and on 1 April 1996, it was formally handed over to United Kingdom Support Command (UKSC) at JHQ Rheindahlen. From 1996, a small in-patient psychiatric unit, and some community services remained on the site, while all other secondary care was transferred to local German hospitals.

== Post hospital years ==
From 1996, a small in-patient psychiatric unit and some community services remained on the site, and it also became the home of the Headquarters of the British Forces Germany Health Services (HQ BFGHS) from 1999 to September 2010. The whole hospital site was then formally handed back to the German authorities.

A group of former personnel visited the hospital in October 2010, and reported that it was in as perfect condition as when it was fully functioning before closure. That is a testament to the original builders and the careful maintenance over 57 years. A video news report was made of this nostalgic visit.

The BFGHS was a partnership arrangement between the Ministry of Defence (MoD); the Soldiers, Sailors, Airman and Families Association (SSAFA); and Guy's and St Thomas' NHS Foundation Trust, London, to provide primary care services, community and outpatient services to the British Forces community throughout Germany.

The hospital's motto was Inter Fera Salus (Latin: In midst of ferocity, healing), and its badge is a wild boar passant overlaid with a Staff of Asclepius.

In November 2015, the hospital site appeared abandoned and derelict, and had suffered much damage from vandalism, fires and theft.

On 15 April 2017, further damage was caused by a large fire. The firefighting was difficult.

== See also ==
- Princess Mary's Royal Air Force Nursing Service
