= David Bill =

British Army general

Lieutenant General Sir David Bill KCB
- Born: 17 November 1954 (age 71)
- Military career
- Allegiance: United Kingdom
- Branch: British Army
- Service years: 1973–2012
- Rank: Lieutenant General
- Commands: Royal College of Defence Studies; UK Support Command (Germany); 39 Engineer Regiment
- Conflicts: Operation Banner
- Awards: Knight Commander of the Order of the Bath

Lieutenant General Sir David Robert Bill, KCB (born 17 November 1954) is a senior British Army officer who served as Commandant of the Royal College of Defence Studies.

== Early life and education ==
Bill was born on 17 November 1954 to Robert Bill, DSO, RN and Wendy Jean Bill (née Booth). He was educated at Charterhouse School and Welbeck College.

== Military career ==
Bill was commissioned into the Royal Engineers in 1973. After commanding 33 Independent Field Squadron in Northern Ireland, he became commanding officer of 39 Engineer Regiment at Waterbeach. He was posted to UK Land Forces in 1997 first as Commander, Royal Engineers and then as Brigadier, General Staff.

Promoted to major general in 2002, Bill became General Officer Commanding UK Support Command (Germany) at Rheindahlen. He went on to be Deputy Commander NATO Rapid Deployable Corps (Italy) in September 2006 and UK Military Representative to NATO in October 2008. He became Commandant of the Royal College of Defence Studies in 2012.

== Family ==
Bill is married to Gabrielle; they have two sons and a daughter.

Military offices
Preceded by John Moore-Bick	GOC United Kingdom Support Command (Germany); 2003–2006	Succeeded by Mungo Melvin
Preceded by Sir Anthony Dymock	UK Military Representative to NATO; 2008–2011	Succeeded by Sir Christopher Harper
Preceded by Charles Style	Commandant of the Royal College of Defence Studies; 2012–2014	Succeeded by Sir Tom Phillips
