= RAF Rheindahlen =

Former Royal Air Force administrative base

RAF Rheindahlen
- Part of JHQ Rheindahlen, British Forces Germany
- Rheindahlen, North Rhine-Westphalia in Germany
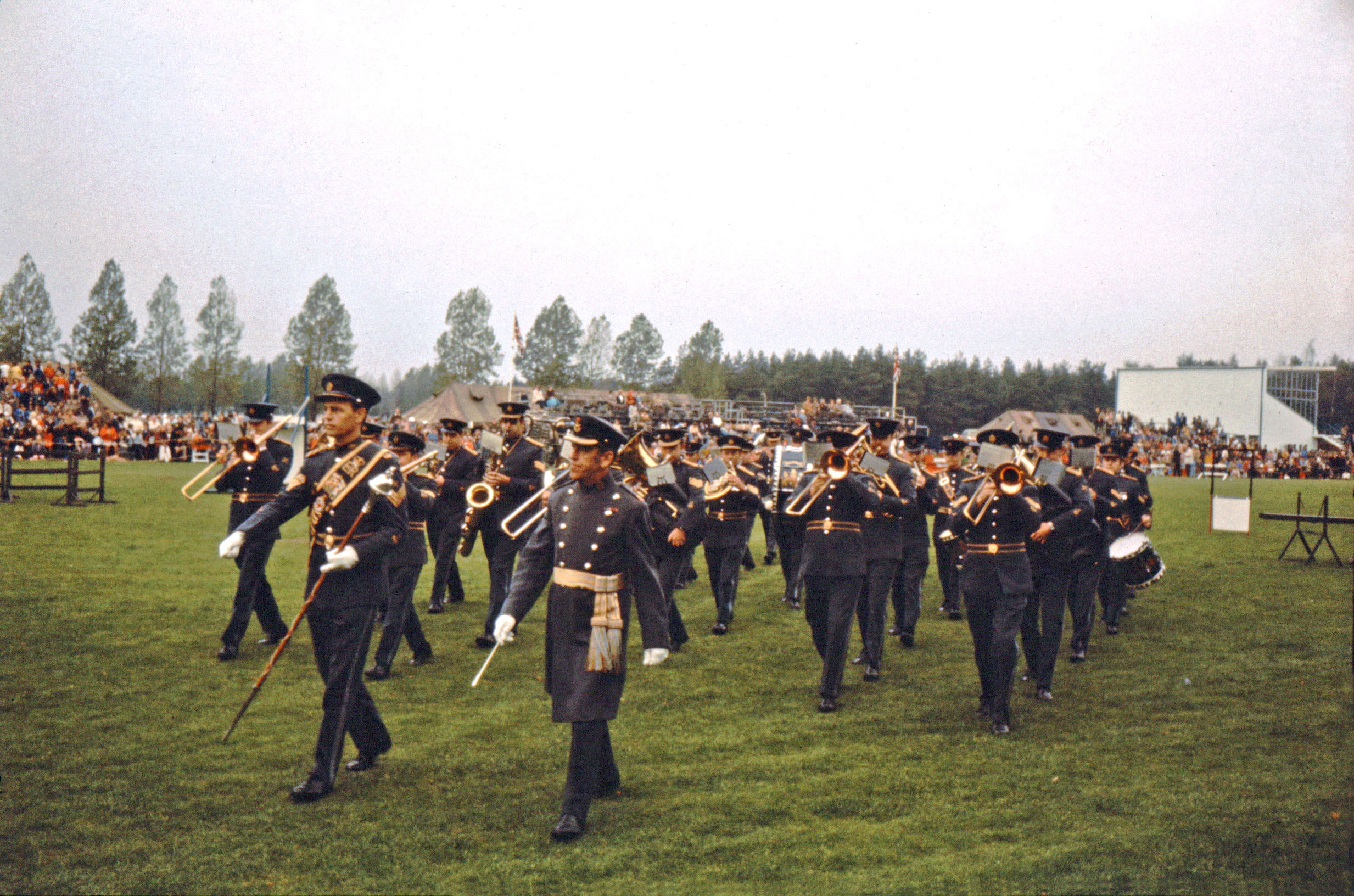
- The Band of RAF Germany perform at the RAF Police Dog Trials on the RAF sports fields at JHQ Rheindahlen, September 1974

Site information
- Type: Royal Air Force station
- Owner: Ministry of Defence (UK)
- Operator: Royal Air Force
- Controlled by: originally: RAF Second Tactical Air Force (2TAF) latterly: Royal Air Force Germany (RAFG)

Location
- Location within North Rhine-Westphalia, Germany
- Coordinates: 51°10′28″N 06°18′34″E

Site history
- Built: 1954; 72 years ago
- Built for: Air Ministry
- In use: 22 November 1954 to 1 April 1993; 33 years ago

The former Royal Air Force Rheindahlen, more commonly known as RAF Rheindahlen, was a non-flying Royal Air Force (RAF) military administrative base, becoming part of the Rheindahlen Military Complex (JHQ Rheindahlen) in North Rhine-Westphalia, Germany; collectively a part of British Forces Germany (BFG). The Royal Air Force station was named after the nearby town and railway station of Rheindahlen. In the 1950s and 1960s, it was more commonly referred to as RAF Mönchengladbach; due to Rheindahlen being the Army's name for the same JHQ. It was unusual in that the RAF station land was publicly accessible, with public transport routes, and even German civilian mail service (Rheindahlen 2).

== History ==
RAF Rheindahlen was established shortly after the headquarters of RAF Second Tactical Air Force (2TAF) moved from RAF Bad Eilsen when Joint Headquarters Rheindahlen opened in October 1954. It served mainly as the administrative support centre for the headquarters of Second Tactical Air Force until 1 January 1959, when it then became the headquarters of Royal Air Force Germany (HQ RAFG).

The Station Headquarters (SHQ) for RAF Rheindahlen was located on the south side of Queens Avenue, in a crescent of three buildings (nos 139, 141 and 143), with the RAF flagstaff on the small lawn in front. Most of the RAF Rheindahlen units (messes, billets, mechanical transport (MT), stores, medical and dental centre, and sports facilities) were located in the same area of Joint Headquarters Rheindahlen, though the many elements occupying JHQ were not confined to specific areas.

No. 11 Signals Unit (11 SU) was located at RAF Rheindahlen from 1 June 1975 to 31 December 1980.

=== Closure ===
RAF Rheindahlen (as a Royal Air Force station entity) was disbanded on 1 April 1993; 33 years ago, becoming Rheindahlen Support Unit (Rheindahlen SU). On the same day, 1 April 1993, No. 2 Group RAF set up headquarters at the then former RAF Rheindahlen, HQ 2 Gp remaining there until 1 April 1996; 30 years ago. After the disbandment of RAF Rheindahlen in 1993, all remaining RAF Rheindahlen facilities were subsequently amalgamated with and occupied by the existing British Army garrison, as HQ United Kingdom Support Command (Germany), the entire area becoming known as the Rheindahlen Military Complex. On 13 December 2013; 12 years ago, all existing British military units left the base, and the whole Rheindahlen Military Complex was officially handed over to the German federal authorities on the same day.

=== Main units ===
RAF Rheindahlen main units
unit name	start date	end date	notes
HQ RAF Second Tactical Air Force (2 TAF)	22 November 1954	1 January 1959	an RAF Command
HQ RAF Germany (RAFG)	1 January 1959	1 May 1972	division of 2 TAF
No 11 Signals Unit	1 June 1975	31 December 1980	
HQ RAF Germany (RAFG)	1 May 1972	1 April 1993	an RAF Command
HQ No 2 Group (2 Gp)	1 April 1993	1 April 1996	disbanded and absorbed into No 1 Group
Band of RAF Germany		1 April 1993	
Joint Support Unit (JSU)	?? 1993	?? 2013	

== See also ==
- RAF Hospital Wegberg — the Royal Air Force hospital created nearby to serve RAF Rheindahlen and other nearby British military establishments
- List of former Royal Air Force stations
