= Wegberg-Wildenrath Test and Validation Centre =

German railway testing facility

Coordinates: 51°06′57″N 6°13′05″E

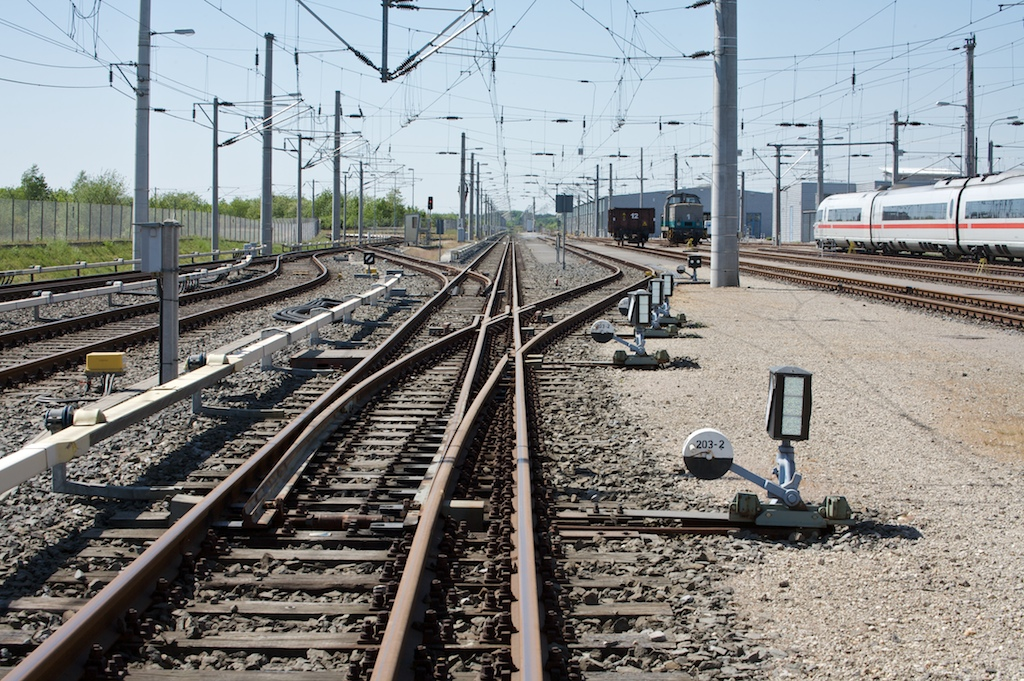

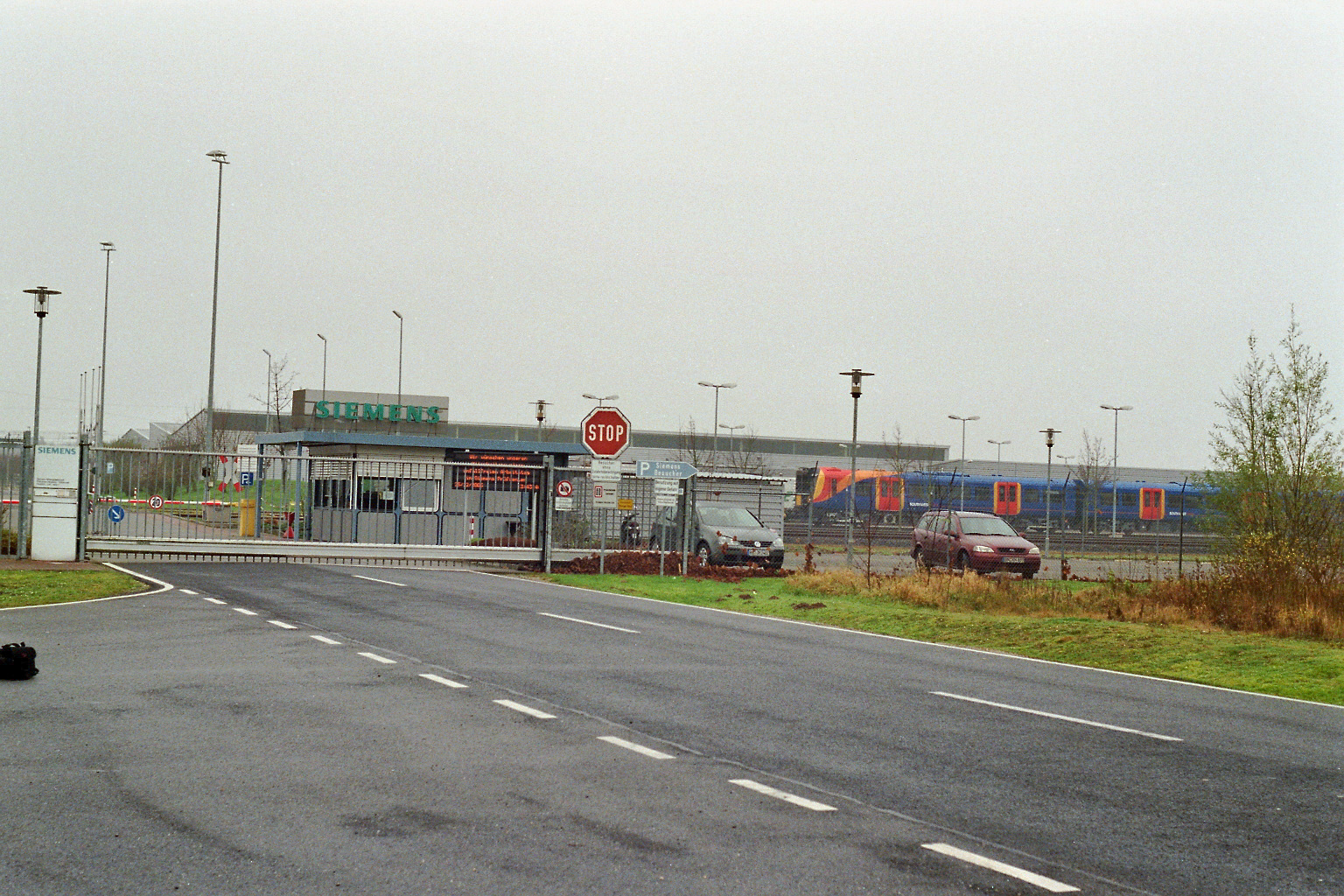
The Siemens test track, showing a British Rail Class 450 to be used on South West Trains

The Wegberg-Wildenrath Test and Validation Centre (German: Prüf- und Validationscenter Wegberg-Wildenrath) is a railway test centre owned by Siemens near Wildenrath in North Rhine-Westphalia, Germany.

== History ==
The centre is located on the site of the former RAF Wildenrath British military airfield. After the airfield closed in 1992, it was taken over by Siemens which opened the test and validation centre in June 1997. It had five tracks over 35 hectares (86 acres). By 2007, the railway test tracks had taken over considerable areas of the airfield, with all but the western threshold and overrun of the runway obliterated. The north-east dispersal is completely taken over by sidings, workshops and loops. Of the southern dispersals, the central and eastern are bisected by the main railway oval test track.

There are ovals of track for testing trains, and various electrification systems. The test track is connected to the rest of the German railway network by a 5.2 km (3.2 mi) long branch line to the German portion of the Iron Rhine freight railway, branching off near Wegberg.

== Testing ==
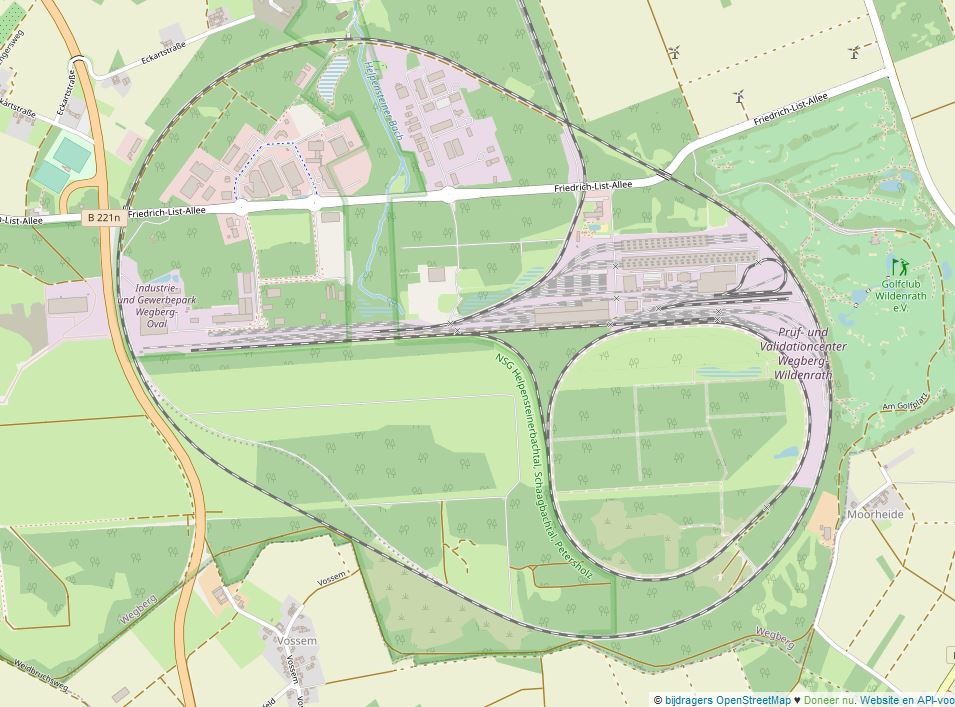
Overview of the Wildenrath railway test track.

As well as Siemens the test tracks are also used by competitors such as Alstom, Bombardier Transportation and Stadler.

There are 28 kilometres (17 mi) of standard and metre gauge tracks. The facility is used for technical acceptance tests and approvals of locomotives, rolling stock and trams under operating conditions, and personnel training. It has been equipped for trials with Galileo.

== See also ==
- Transportation Technology Center
- Velim test centre
