= John Henderson (British Army officer) =

Major General John Henderson CB

Chief Executive of Staffordshire County Council
- Incumbent
- Assumed office May 2015

Personal details
- Salary: £180,000 (plus performance related pay)

Military service
- Allegiance: United Kingdom
- Branch/service: British Army
- Years of service: 1982-2014
- Rank: Major General
- Commands: British Forces Germany
- Awards: Companion of the Order of the Bath

Major General John McNiven Ross Henderson CB is a retired British Army officer who commanded British Forces Germany. He became Chief Executive of Staffordshire County Council in May 2015.

== Early life ==
Henderson was educated at Heriot-Watt University (BSc, 1984) and Cranfield University (MSc, 1995).

== Military career ==
Henderson was commissioned into the Royal Electrical and Mechanical Engineers in 1982. He became Commanding Officer of 2 Battalion REME in June 2002 and Commander of the Provincial Reconstruction Team in Afghanistan in June 2004 before becoming Deputy Chief of Staff for 1st Armoured Division in January 2005 and then Commander of 102 Logistic Brigade in December 2006. He went on to be Director Logistics for the Army in December 2008 and General Officer Commanding British Forces Germany in August 2012.

Henderson was appointed Companion of the Order of the Bath (CB) in the 2014 New Year Honours.

Military offices
Preceded by Nicholas Caplin	GOC British Forces Germany; 2012–2015	Succeeded by Ian Bell
