= Nick Caplin =

British Army general

Major General Nick Caplin CB CBE
- Born: 4 December 1958 (age 67)
- Military career
- Allegiance: United Kingdom
- Branch: British Army
- Service years: 1980–2014
- Rank: Major General
- Commands: UK Support Command (Germany); Collective Training Group; School of Army Aviation; 3 Regiment Army Air Corps
- Conflicts: The Troubles; Bosnian War
- Awards: Companion of the Order of the Bath; Commander of the Order of the British Empire

Major General Nicholas John Caplin, CB, CBE (born 4 December 1958) is a retired British Army officer who commanded United Kingdom Support Command (Germany) from 2009 to 2012.

== Military career ==
Educated at Poole Grammar School and the University of Surrey (BSc Economics), Caplin was commissioned into the Army Air Corps, joining 661 Squadron AAC in 1980. As a junior officer he served in Northern Ireland.

Promoted to lieutenant colonel, Caplin became a member of the directing staff at the Staff College, Camberley, in 1995 and commanding officer of 3 Regiment Army Air Corps at Wattisham in 1997, at which time his regiment was involved in operations in Bosnia and Herzegovina. He became deputy commander and chief of staff of the Joint Helicopter Force (Northern Ireland) in January 2000, Commandant of the School of Army Aviation in Middle Wallop in 2001 and, following promotion to brigadier, he became deputy commander and chief of staff of the Joint Helicopter Command in January 2003. He went on to be commander of Collective Training Group in January 2006, Kosovo Protection Corps co-ordinator in March 2008 and General Officer Commanding United Kingdom Support Command (Germany) in August 2009. He became chief army instructor at the Royal College of Defence Studies in October 2012.

In July 2014, it was announced that Caplin had been appointed chief executive of Blind Veterans UK, the charity for blind and vision-impaired ex-Service men and women, with effect from October 2014. He was appointed a Commander of the Order of the British Empire in the 2023 Birthday Honours for services to veterans and the vision impaired.

Military offices
Preceded by Mungo Melvin	GOC United Kingdom Support Command (Germany); 2009–2012	Succeeded by John Henderson
