= Mungo Melvin =

British historian

Major General Mungo Melvin CB OBE
- Born: 1955 (age 70–71)
- Military career
- Allegiance: United Kingdom
- Branch: British Army
- Service years: 1975–2011
- Rank: Major General
- Commands: UK Support Command (Germany)
- Awards: Companion of the Order of the Bath; Officer of the Order of the British Empire

Major General Robert Adam Mungo Simpson Melvin CB OBE (born 1955) is a retired British Army officer, and a military historian. He is best known for his biography of German field marshal Erich von Manstein. He is an editorial board member of the Journal of Intelligence and Terrorism Studies.

== Military career ==
Educated at Daniel Stewart's College in Edinburgh, Welbeck College, Worksop, the Royal Military Academy at Sandhurst, Downing College, Cambridge and the German Armed Forces Command and Staff College in Hamburg, Melvin was commissioned into the Royal Engineers in 1975. He became Director, Land Warfare in June 2002, Director of Operational Capability at the Ministry of Defence in 2004 and General Officer Commanding United Kingdom Support Command (Germany) in 2006. He went on to be Chief Army Instructor at the Royal College of Defence Studies in 2009 before retiring in 2011.

In 2009 he appeared as an expert witness at the International Criminal Tribunal for Yugoslavia. He is an associate senior fellow of the Royal United Services Institute.

== Manstein biography ==
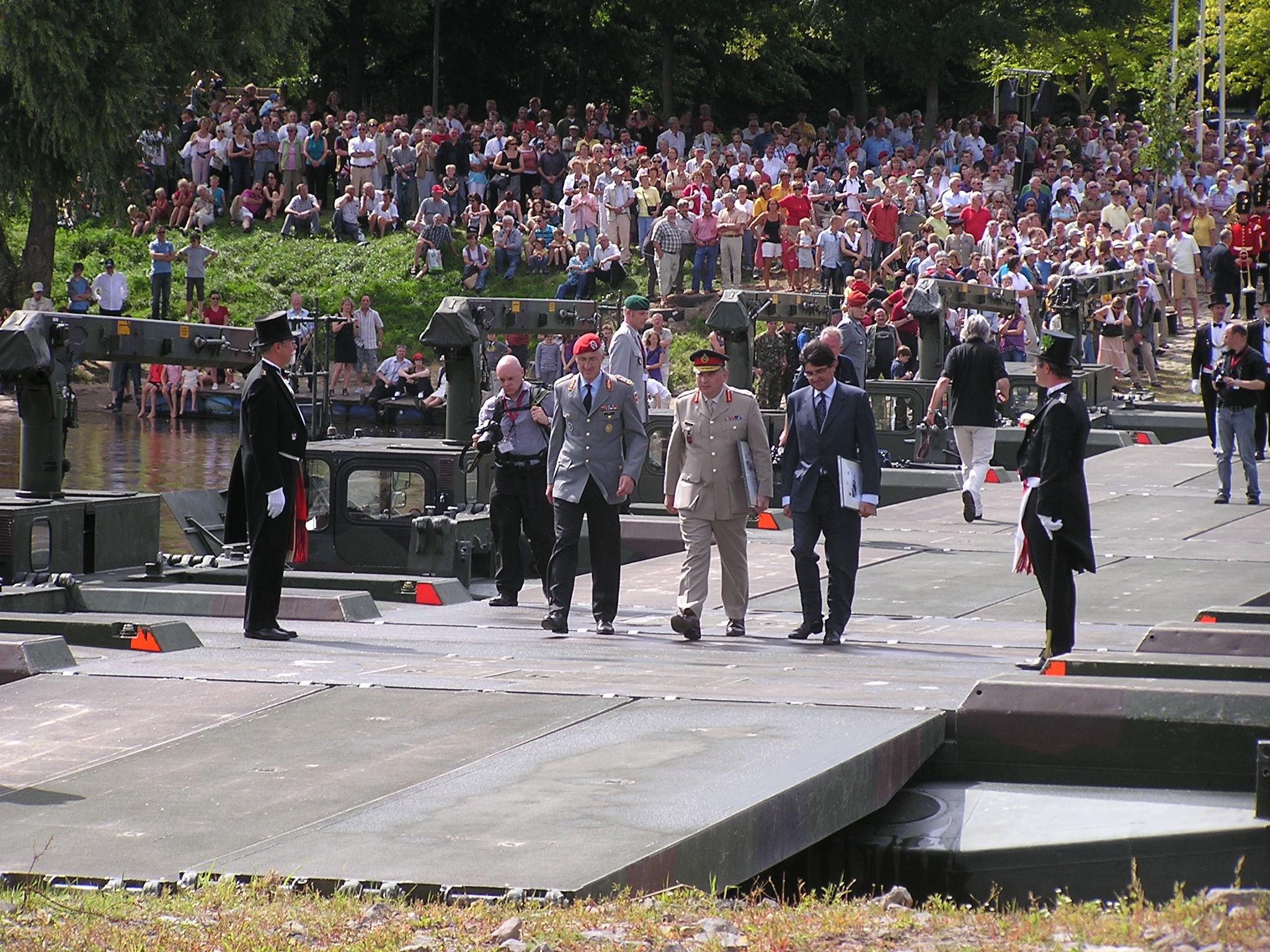
Mungo Melvin and German General Markus Kneip crossing the Weser on 1 August 2009

During his Army service in Germany, Melvin learned German and developed an interest in German military history. The product of this was his 2010 biography of Erich von Manstein. Manstein is widely regarded as the most gifted German commander of World War II, but he was also a convicted war criminal who never acknowledged his own or the German Army's responsibility for the crimes committed on the Eastern Front while he held major commands there. Melvin's conclusion was that Manstein was a product of his age, his class, his education and his own stubborn personality, all of which blinded him to the ethical conflict between his duty as a German officer to obey the orders of the legitimate government, and the increasingly criminal nature of the Nazi regime.

Reviews of Melvin's book concentrated on this question. Alexander Rose in The New York Times referred to "Mungo Melvin’s authoritative and splendidly comprehensive biography" but criticized what he saw as Melvin's narrow focus on military matters. Tom Nagorski in The Wall Street Journal found fault with Melvin's concentration on detailed descriptions of Manstein's work as a military commander.

Military offices
| Preceded by David Bill | GOC United Kingdom Support Command (Germany); 2006–2009 | Succeeded by Nicholas Caplin |
