= British Services Security Organisation (Germany) =

- Allegiance: United Kingdom
- Branch: MI5
- Role: Counter Intelligence, counter terrorism and security liaison with German agencies
- Part of: JIC(G)
- Garrison/HQ: JHQ Rheindahlen, Berlin and Cologne

The British Services Security Organisation (Germany) (abbreviated as BSSO(G)) was a MI5 sponsored organisation supporting British senior commanders with multi-source security intelligence directed initially at counter espionage, but near the end of its operational life much involved in counter terrorism support.

BSSO(G) was the successor of a post-war security intelligence unit to the British Forces Security Unit (BFSU) in March 1954. In 1961 BSSO(G) was refocused on supporting British forces chiefs in Germany rather than collecting at the behest of London.

The first head of BSSO was Major-General Denis Price, CB, CBE.

BSSO(G) had an important role in maintaining liaison with German Federal and State Security Services (i.e. BfV and LfV); in performing this role BSSO(G)'s office in Cologne was vital.

Much of the detail of BSSO(G) operations and relationships especially in the latter stages of its life are still classified
