= Wildenrath =

- Stadtteil of Wegberg
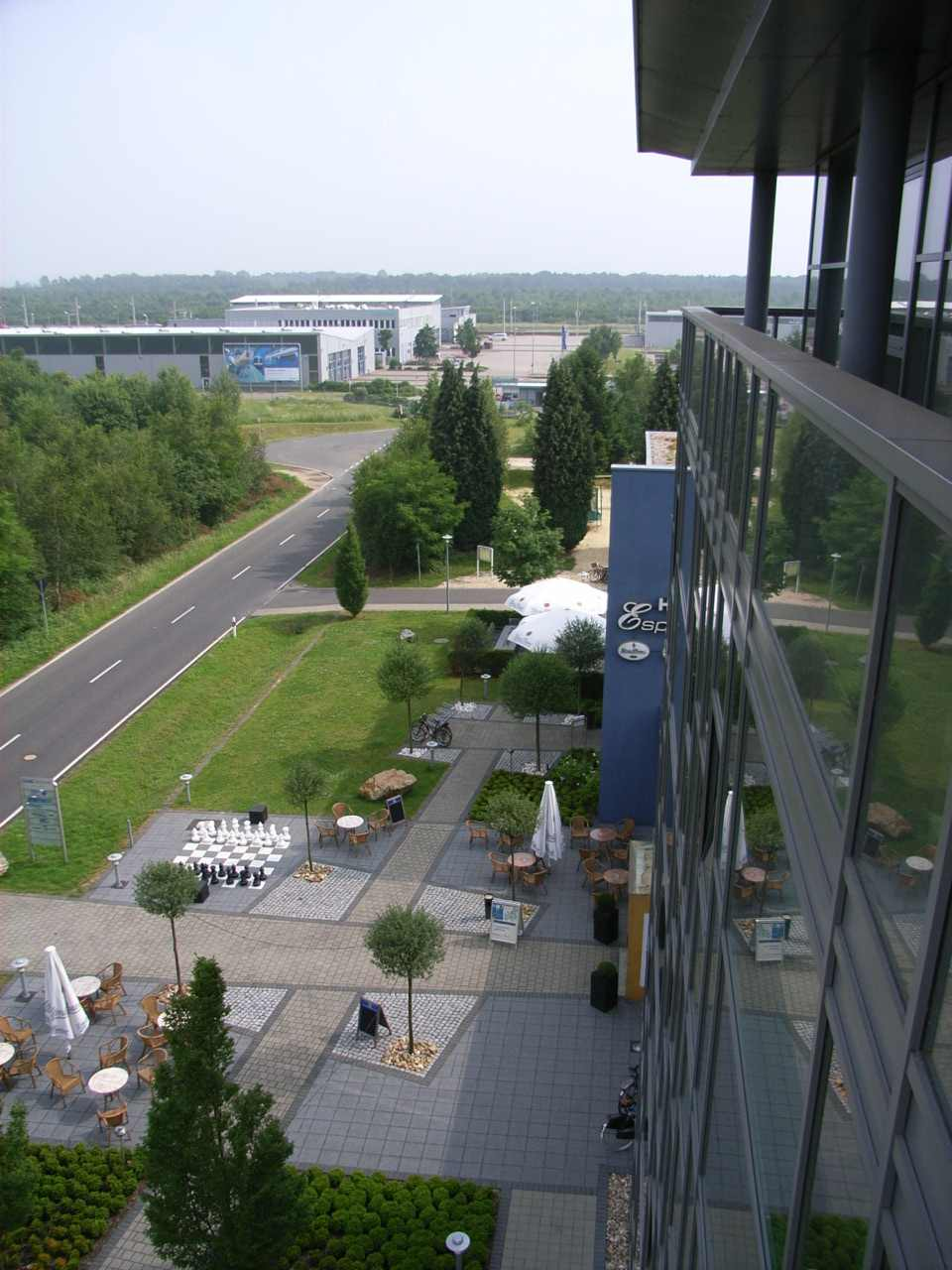
- The Siemens test centre at Wildenrath

- Coat of arms
- Interactive map of Wildenrath
- Location within Germany Location within North Rhine-Westphalia
- Coordinates: 51°07′N 6°11′E
- Country: Germany
- State: North Rhine-Westphalia
- Admin. region: Köln
- District: Heinsberg
- Town: Wegberg

Population (2020)
  - Total: 1,619
- Time zone: UTC+01:00 (CET)
  - Summer (DST): UTC+02:00 (CEST)
- Postal codes: 41844
- Dialling codes: 02434
- Website: www.wegberg.de

Wildenrath is a township within the municipality of Wegberg in North Rhine-Westphalia, Germany. The town is situated on the Bundesstraße 221 between Wassenberg and Arsbeck on the edge of Maas-Schwalm-Nette Nature Park and close to the border with the Netherlands.

For 40 years, the town was the home of the British military airfield, RAF Wildenrath. After the airfield closed in 1992, it became the Test- and Validationcenter Wegberg-Wildenrath, a railway test centre operated by Siemens Mobility.

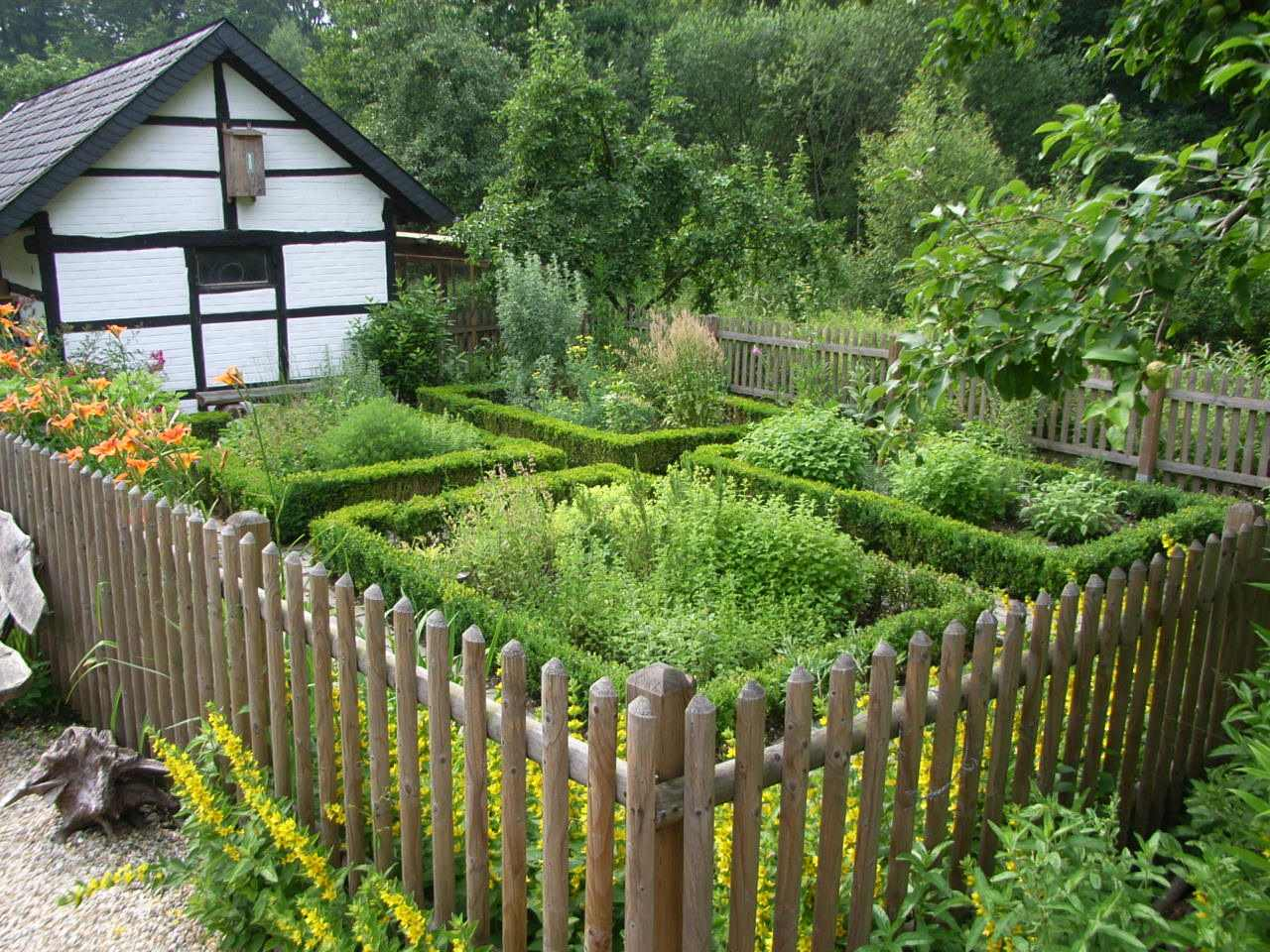
The "Haus Wildenrath" heritage farm

== Climate ==
Climate in this area has mild differences between highs and lows, and there is adequate rainfall year-round. The Köppen Climate Classification subtype for this climate is "Cfb" (Marine West Coast Climate/Oceanic climate).

Climate data for Wildenrath
Month	Jan	Feb	Mar	Apr	May	Jun	Jul	Aug	Sep	Oct	Nov	Dec	Year
Mean daily maximum °C (°F)	4 (39)	6 (42)	10 (50)	14 (58)	19 (66)	22 (71)	23 (73)	23 (74)	19 (67)	15 (59)	9 (48)	6 (42)	14 (57)
Mean daily minimum °C (°F)	0 (32)	1 (34)	3 (37)	5 (41)	9 (48)	12 (54)	13 (56)	14 (57)	12 (53)	8 (46)	4 (40)	2 (36)	7 (45)
Average precipitation mm (inches)	64 (2.5)	56 (2.2)	38 (1.5)	46 (1.8)	69 (2.7)	69 (2.7)	89 (3.5)	86 (3.4)	61 (2.4)	46 (1.8)	79 (3.1)	66 (2.6)	760 (30)
Source: Weatherbase
