= RAF Wildenrath =

Former Royal Air Force station in North Rhine-Westphalia, Germany

Royal Air Force Station Wildenrath
- Wildenrath, North Rhine-Westphalia in Germany

Site information
- Type: Royal Air Force flying station
- Owner: Ministry of Defence (UK)
- Operator: Royal Air Force
- Controlled by: RAF Second Tactical Air Force; Royal Air Force Germany

Location
- Shown within North Rhine-Westphalia RAF Wildenrath (Germany)
- Coordinates: 51°06′52″N 006°13′18″E

Site history
- Built: 1951/2
- In use: 15 January 1952 – 1 April 1992; 34 years ago
- Fate: closed, redeveloped into railway test centre

Garrison information
- Past commanders: Gp Capt JE 'Johnnie' Johnson

Airfield information
- Identifiers: IATA: WID, ICAO: EDUW
Runways
Direction	Length and surface
09/27	2,468 metres (8,097 ft) asphalt
- Motto: Immer Bereit (German); Always ready / ever prepared

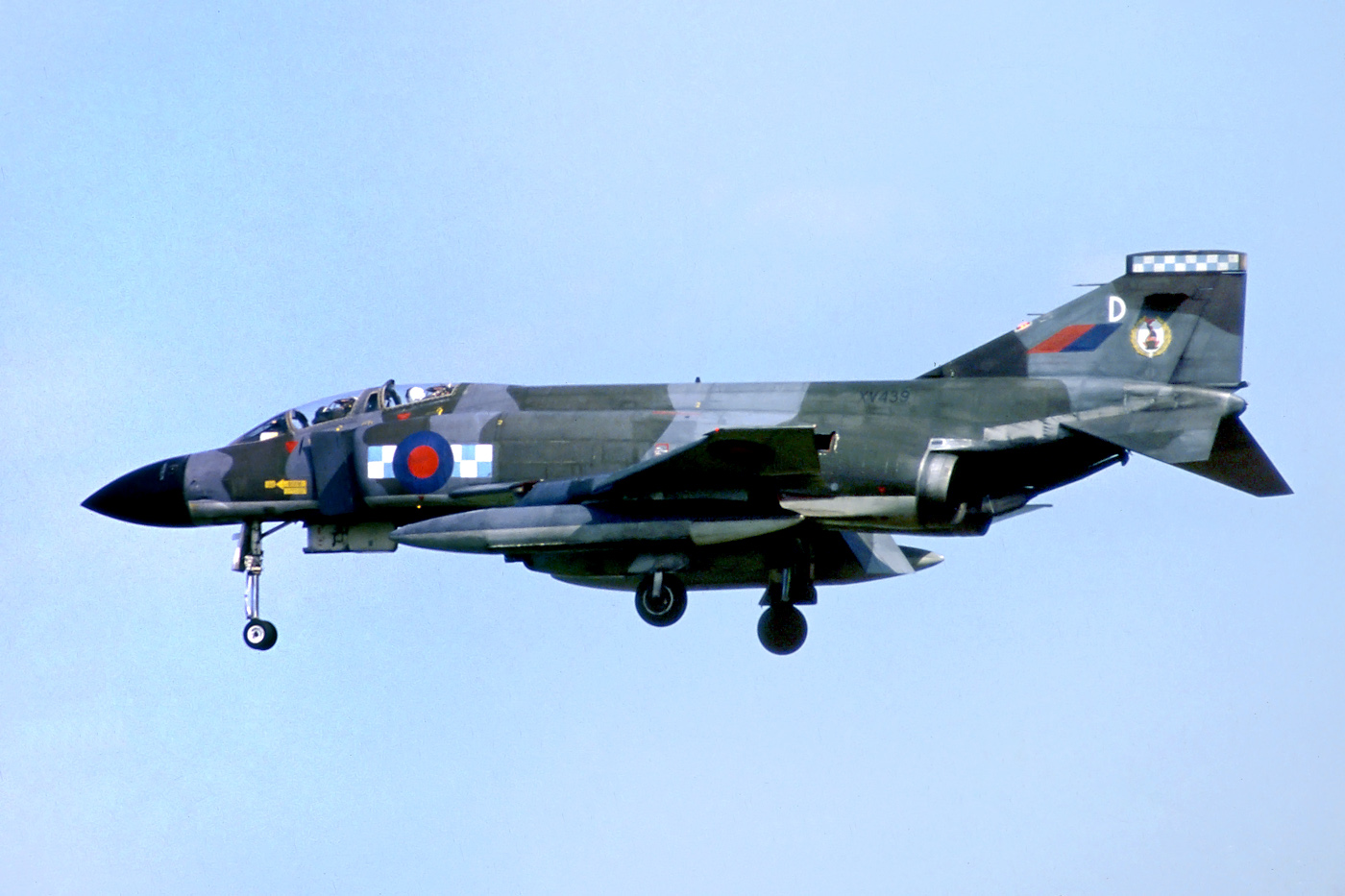
RAF Phantom FGR2 XV439 'D' on short finals for runway 27, RAF Wildenrath, 7 July 1982.

Royal Air Force Station Wildenrath, commonly known as RAF Wildenrath, was a Royal Air Force (RAF) military airbase near Wildenrath in North Rhine-Westphalia, Germany, that operated from 1952 to 1992. Wildenrath was the first of four 'clutch' stations built for the Royal Air Force in West Germany during the early 1950s.

== RAF service ==
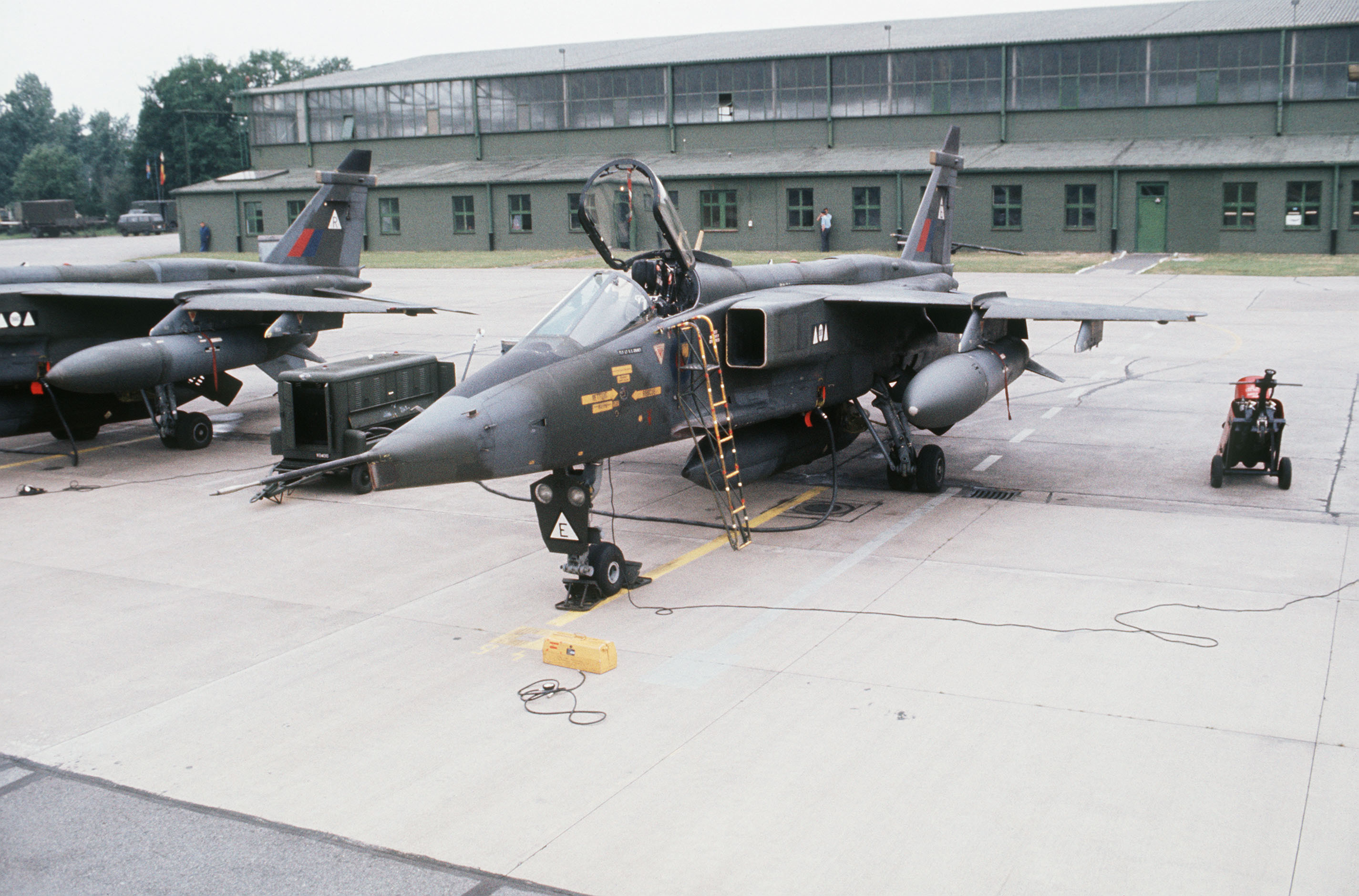
Visiting SEPECAT Jaguar GR1 of No. 2 Squadron RAF parked on the flight line during 'Tactical Air Meet '78' at RAF Wildenrath, on 15 May 1978.

RAF Wildenrath opened on 15 January 1952, and was followed by RAF Geilenkirchen on 24 May 1953, RAF Brüggen in July 1953, and RAF Laarbruch that opened on 15 October 1954. RAF Wildenrath, RAF Brüggen, and RAF Laarbruch were physically close to each other, and came under the auspices of NATO's Second Allied Tactical Air Force (2ATAF).

In 1953, the Station Commander was Group Captain JE 'Johnnie' Johnson, a top-scoring British 'ace' fighter pilot of the Second World War. There were two Canadair Sabre F.4 squadrons (Nos 67 and 71 Squadrons RAF), and a Sabre conversion flight. Also on site were 724 Signals Unit (Fighter control radar), 402 Air Stores Park, a unit of the RAF Regiment, and a British Army detachment that maintained landlines (AFS).

On 15 January 1956, 88 Squadron reformed with B(I).8 Canberras at Wildenrath, and was renumbered 14 Squadron on 17 December 1962.

From the late 1950s to 1970, Wildenrath was home to 14 Squadron and 17 Squadron; the former flew B(I).8 Canberras, and was part of the 2nd ATAF tactical nuclear strike force. The locations of their quick-readiness dispersals can still be seen to the south of the former main gate. No. 17 Squadron flew the PR.7 Canberra, and the two squadrons' 'in house' T.4 training aircraft were combined into the so-called 'T4 Flight' as a separate sub-unit, forming a useful additional resource for 2ATAF senior officers to use to maintain their flying hours. In the early 1960s, 88 Squadron Canberras were also based at Wildenrath. The base was also used for 'CasEvac' (emergency casualty evacuations) usually to the United Kingdom. In November 1956, the RAF operated a three-day airlift to fly over 100 short tons (91 tonnes) of humanitarian relief supplies from Wildenrath to Vienna, for the Red Cross to distribute in Hungary during the Hungarian uprising, before the revolt was ended with Soviet military intervention.

In 1960, the Station Commander was Group Captain 'Bats' Barthold, and 17 Squadron was commanded by Wing Commander Dugald 'Buster' Lumsden, who accepted the squadron's colours presented by Marshal of the Royal Air Force Sir Dermot Boyle. At this time, the commanding officer of 2ATAF (former Battle of Britain fighter pilot, Sir Christopher Foxley-Norris) had a Vickers Valetta aircraft as his personal transport, its lower fuselage and wings kept highly polished by the ground-crew of the RAF Germany (RAFG) Communication Flight. The aircraft was eventually declared un-airworthy due to many of its rivet-heads having been polished off. The RAFG Communications Flight later in 1969 adopted the identity of 60 Squadron, which had disbanded as a Gloster Javelin squadron at RAF Tengah in Singapore the previous year.

In the 1970s, Wildenrath served as the initial home of the RAF 'Harrier Force', which included numbers 3, 4, and 20 Squadrons, as well as 21(AS) Signal Regiment. In 1974–5, the Wildenrath station commander was Group Captain Patrick 'Paddy' Hine, who later rose to Air Chief Marshal and Joint Commander of all British forces during the 1991 Gulf War.

1976-77 saw Wildenrath's role within RAF Germany change, as it became home to the command's air defence squadrons, with 19 Squadron and 92 Squadron moving in from RAF Gutersloh, having converted from the English Electric Lightning to the McDonnell Douglas F-4 Phantom II, and taking advantage of the Phantom's longer range. 3 and 4 Squadrons went the opposite direction, moving to Gutersloh, while 20 Squadron stood down from the Harrier, reforming at RAF Bruggen with the SEPECAT Jaguar GR1.

While nominally a communication and light transport squadron, 60 Squadron also had a secondary, covert, role. Initially using the Hunting Percival Pembrokes, and later the Hawker Siddeley Andover from the mid-to-late 1980s, they were employed to take photographs of Soviet and East German armed forces while flying along the Berlin air corridors. It also operated DH Devon and DH Heron aircraft. In addition to its other overt and covert functions, 60 Squadron also acted as visiting aircraft flight for Wildenrath, hosting almost every type of RAF and NATO aircraft and civilian 'trooper' BAC-111s and Boeing 737s.

Wildenrath was also home to an Army Air Corps (AAC) flight operating light helicopters and fixed wing aircraft such as the Westland Scout and De Havilland Beaver. The flight had its own hangar facilities on the base and various flight designations throughout its tenancy. Known initially as 12 Independent Liaison Flight, it then was renamed to 31 Flight, then 131 Flight Royal Corps of Transport (ex RASC), No. 669 Squadron AAC, and then in its last colours with a return to the 12 Flight title. The flight was crewed by members of the corps under which the flight was named with the REME providing the technical servicing and maintenance of the aircraft.

On 1 May 1988, two airmen from the RAF Regiment squadron based at RAF Wildenrath were attacked by IRA armed assailants whilst sitting in a car in the nearby Dutch town of Roermond. One of the airmen died from gunshot wounds, the other was seriously injured.

In October 1989, an RAF corporal and his infant daughter were shot dead at the petrol station in Wildenrath village, outside the RAF airbase. The IRA claimed that it was responsible for the murders.

Wildenrath had five separate dispersal areas around its single runway. Alpha and Echo were not used in the normal flying operations of the station. No 19 Squadron operated from one of the three dispersals on the far (south) side of the airfield, designated 'Bravo Dispersal'. It also housed the two operational 'Battle Flights' for both fighter squadrons. No 92 Squadron flew from 'Delta Dispersal', with both squadrons using the hardened aircraft shelters in 'Charlie Dispersal' for spare space to house Phantoms when necessary. Charlie Dispersal was also used by cross-trained 60 Squadron ground crew to turn around visiting aircraft during station exercises. The taxiway that ran parallel to the main runway and linked the three dispersals was used as the alternate runway for emergencies if the main runway was compromised. Alpha Dispersal was the site used for the Bloodhound launchers, and Echo Dispersal housed the fuel and lubricants storage section. 60 Squadron operated from the hangar close to the main Squadron Servicing hangar on the 'soft side' (northern) of the airbase.

Wildenrath closed as a flying base on 1 April 1992; 34 years ago. The last flying squadron still present at that time, No 60 Squadron, moved to the nearby RAF Brüggen.

== Wildenrath units ==
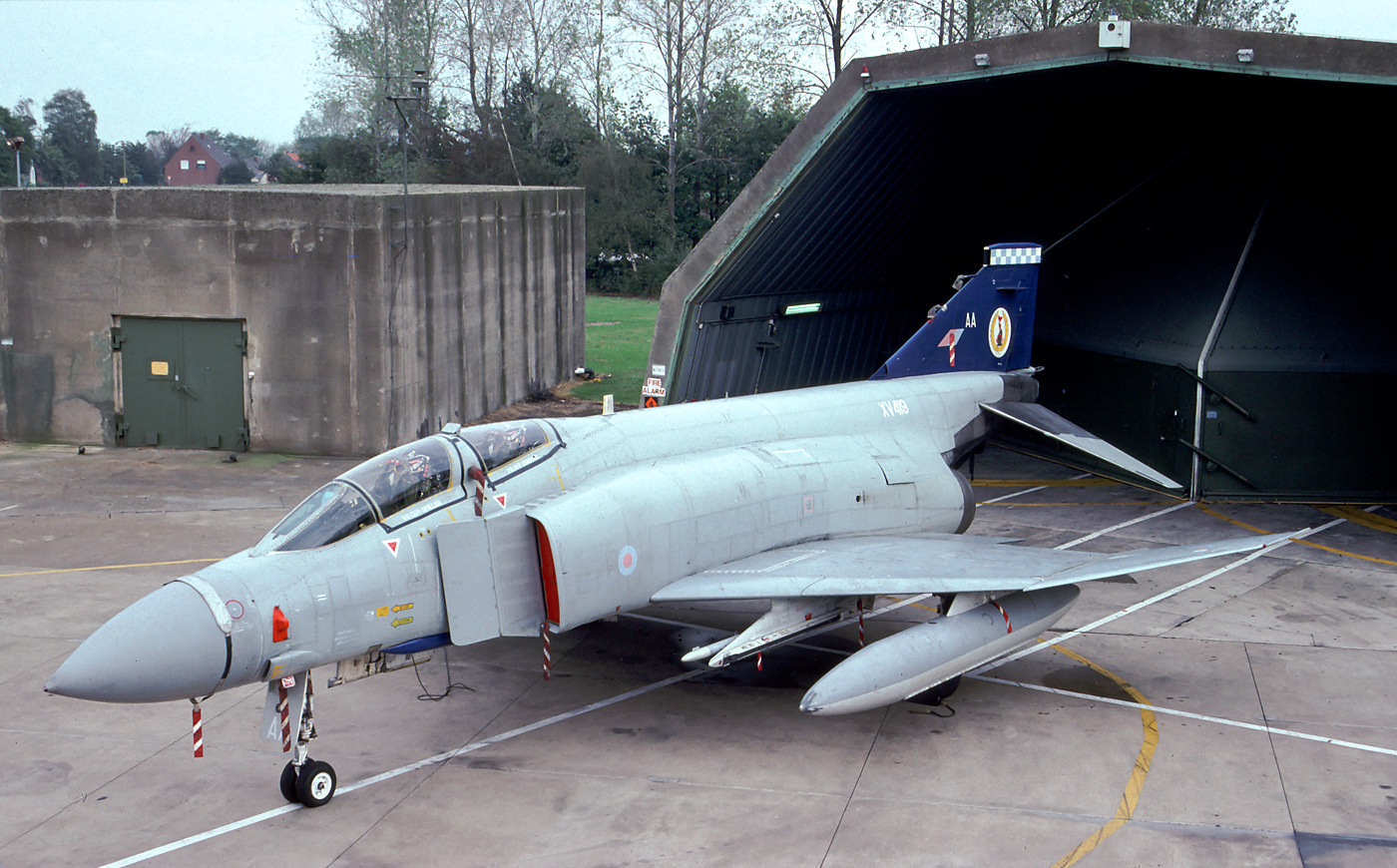
RAF Phantom FGR2 XV419 'AA' of 19 Squadron in front of its hardened aircraft shelter at RAF Wildenrath in October 1991.

- No. 3 Squadron RAF; Harrier GR1 / T2 - later converted to GR3 / T4
- No. 4 Squadron RAF; Harrier GR1 / T2 - later converted to GR3 / T4
- No. 14 Squadron RAF; English Electric Canberra B(I)8 (62–70), T4
- No. 17 Squadron RAF; English Electric Canberra PR7, T4
- No. 19 Squadron RAF; F-4 Phantom II FGR2
- No. 20 Squadron RAF; Harrier GR1 / T2 - later converted to GR3 / T4
- No. 60 Squadron RAF; Percival Pembroke C1 / C(PR)1, Hawker Siddeley Andover C1 / CC2
- No. 67 Squadron RAF; Canadair Sabre F4 1952/5
- No. 71 Squadron RAF; Canadair Sabre F4, 1952/5
- No. 88 Squadron RAF; English Electric Canberra B(I)8, 1956/62 renumbered to 14 Sqn
- No. 92 Squadron RAF; F-4 Phantom II FGR2
- Flight of No. 25 Squadron RAF; Bristol Bloodhound surface to air missiles sometime between 1971/83
- 2TAF Communications Squadron; Percival Pembroke C1 passenger duties and photo recon.
- No. 16 Squadron RAF Regiment with Rapier missiles
- No. 4 Wing RAF Regiment
- RAFG Freight Distribution Centre
- 21 Signal Regiment (Air Support) (1943-)

== RAF Wildenrath today ==
Since 1997, the original airfield and immediate environs comprise the Wegberg-Wildenrath Test and Validation Centre, a facility for testing railway vehicles operated by Siemens AG. By 2007, the railway test tracks had taken over considerable areas of the airfield. All but the western threshold and overrun of the runway has been obliterated, and the eastern runway threshold is now a golf course, rather than the site of Bloodhound surface to air missiles. The north-east dispersal is completely taken over by sidings, workshops, and shunting loops. Of the southern dispersals, the central and eastern are bisected by the main railway oval test track. The south western dispersal and hardened aircraft shelters have been dismantled and removed, with a small section of surviving taxiways being used for recreational purposes by local residents.

The housing areas of the former RAF Wildenrath were originally used as overspill housing for RAF Bruggen, and then used to accommodate other UK military personnel until the end of September 2012, when the land was formally handed back to German local authorities. Since 2015, the former married quarters have been used as temporary accommodation for refugees, under the name 'Siedlung Petersholz' (Petersholz Estate) within the 'Zentrale Unterbringseinrichtung Wegberg' (Wegberg Central Accommodation Facility).

== See also ==
- List of Royal Air Force aircraft squadrons
