= British Forces Germany =

Coordinates: 52°07′34″N 8°40′59″E

- Active: 2012–2020
- Country: Germany
- Branch: British Army; Royal Air Force
- Type: Military formation
- Part of: Land Command
- Garrison/HQ: Bielefeld, Germany
- Nickname: BFG

British Forces Germany (BFG) was the generic name for the three services of the British Armed Forces, made up of service personnel, UK civil servants, and dependents (family members), based in Germany. It existed from 2012 to 2020. It was established following the withdrawal of the British Army of the Rhine (BAOR) and RAF Germany (RAFG) after the beginning of the 21st century.

It was the largest concentration of British armed forces permanently stationed outside the United Kingdom. With the end of the Cold War, and the Options for Change defence review in the early 1990s, BFG as a whole was considerably reduced, with the British presence centred on the 1st Armoured Division, and supporting elements.

Following the 2010 Strategic Defence and Security Review, the permanent deployment in Germany ended in 2020. This was after British forces personnel were scaled down over several years, with 19,100 in April 2010, and 2,850 in April 2019. But around 185 British Army personnel and 60 Ministry of Defence civilians will stay in Germany beyond 2020.

The remaining presence in Germany is known as British Army Germany.

== History ==
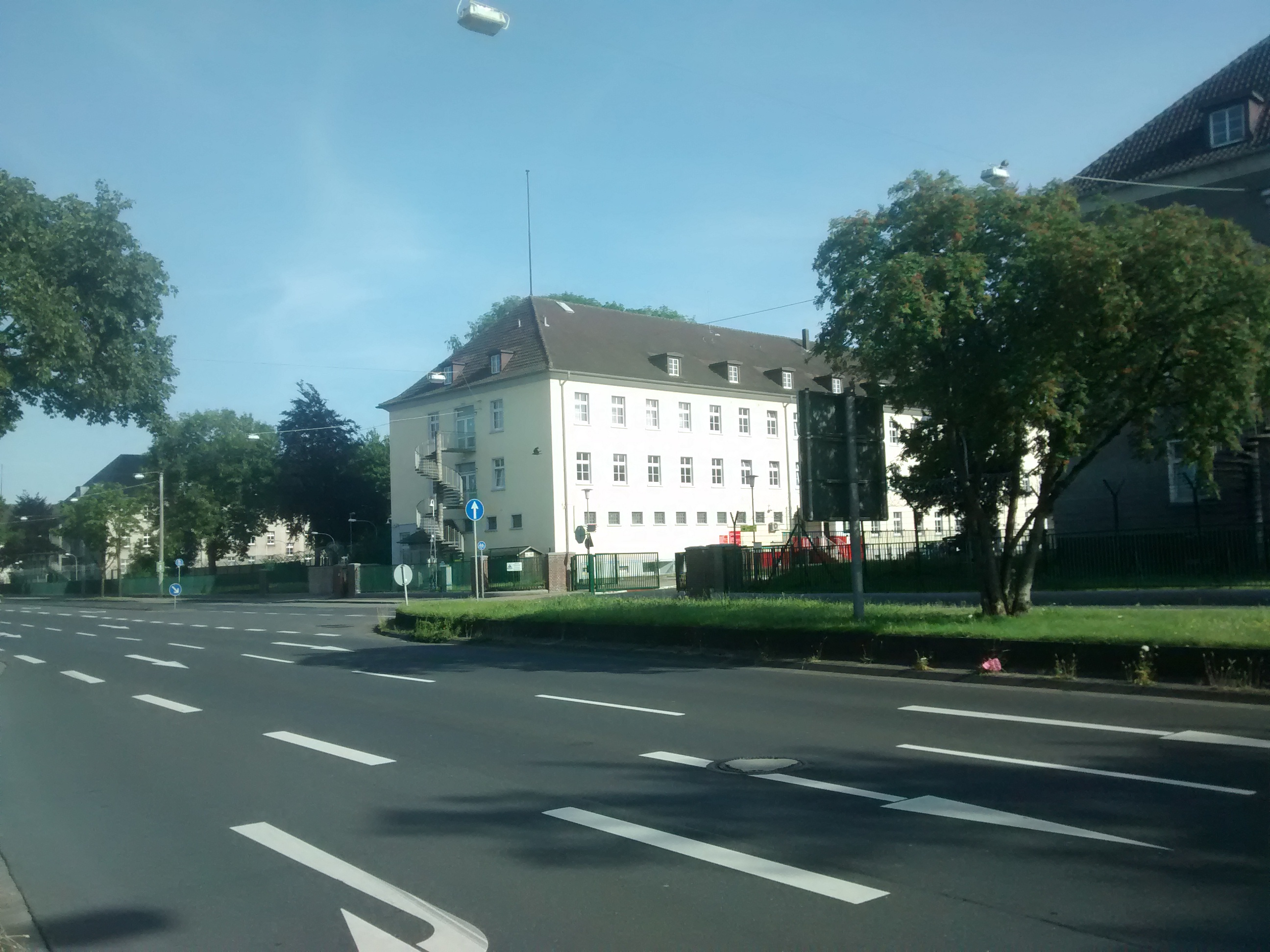
Bielefeld Headquarter entrance

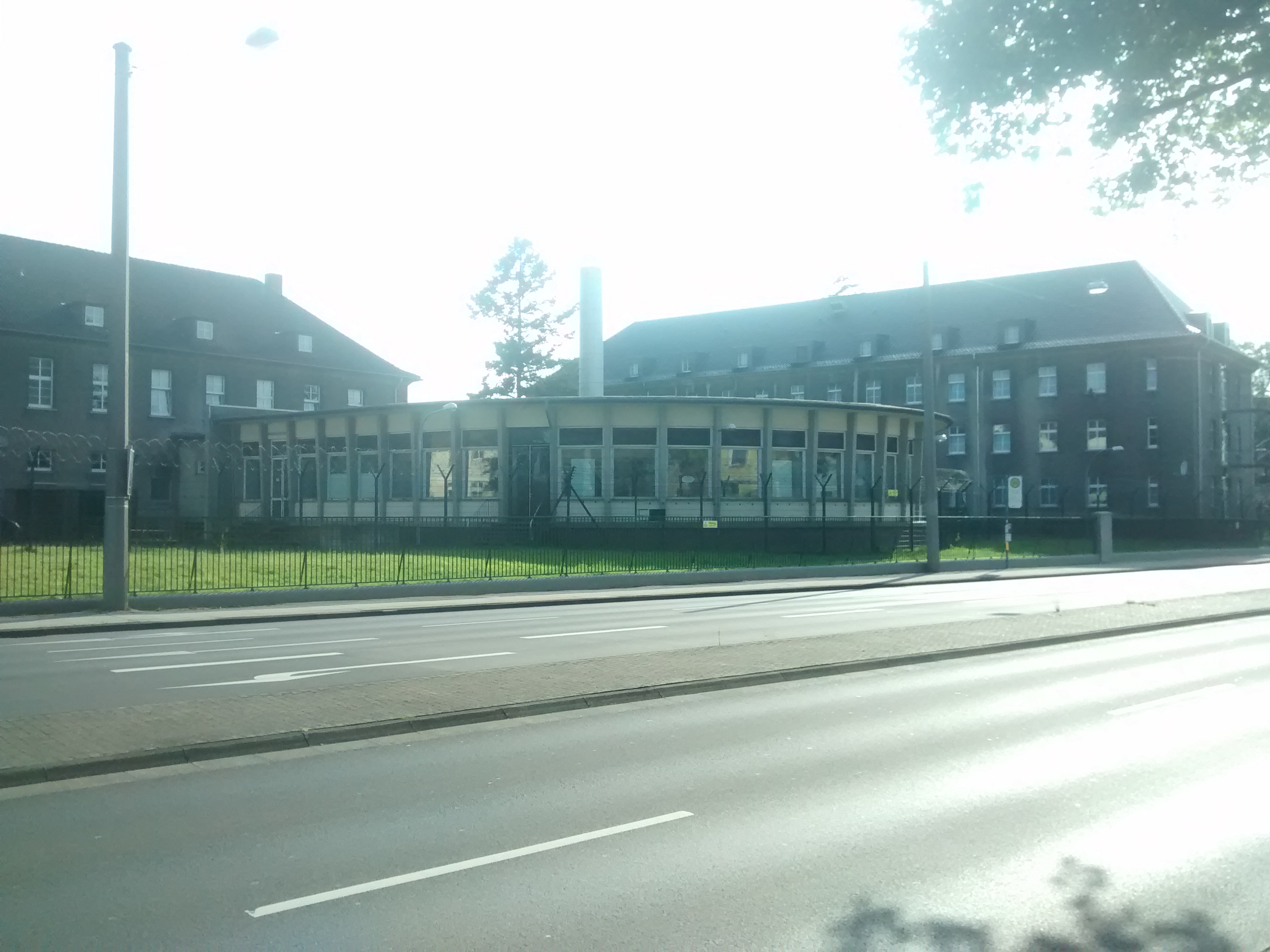
Bielefeld Headquarter corner

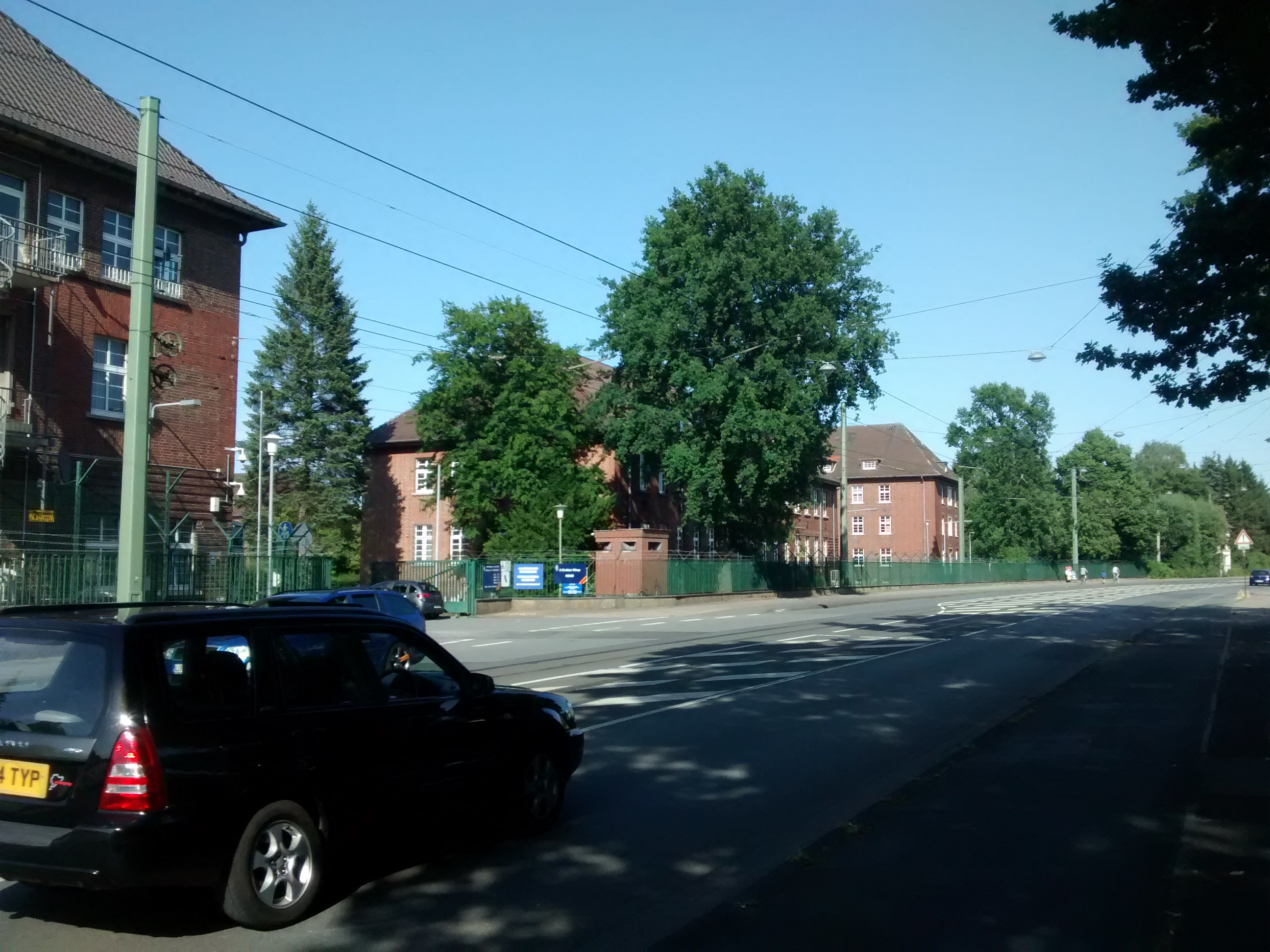
Bielefeld building

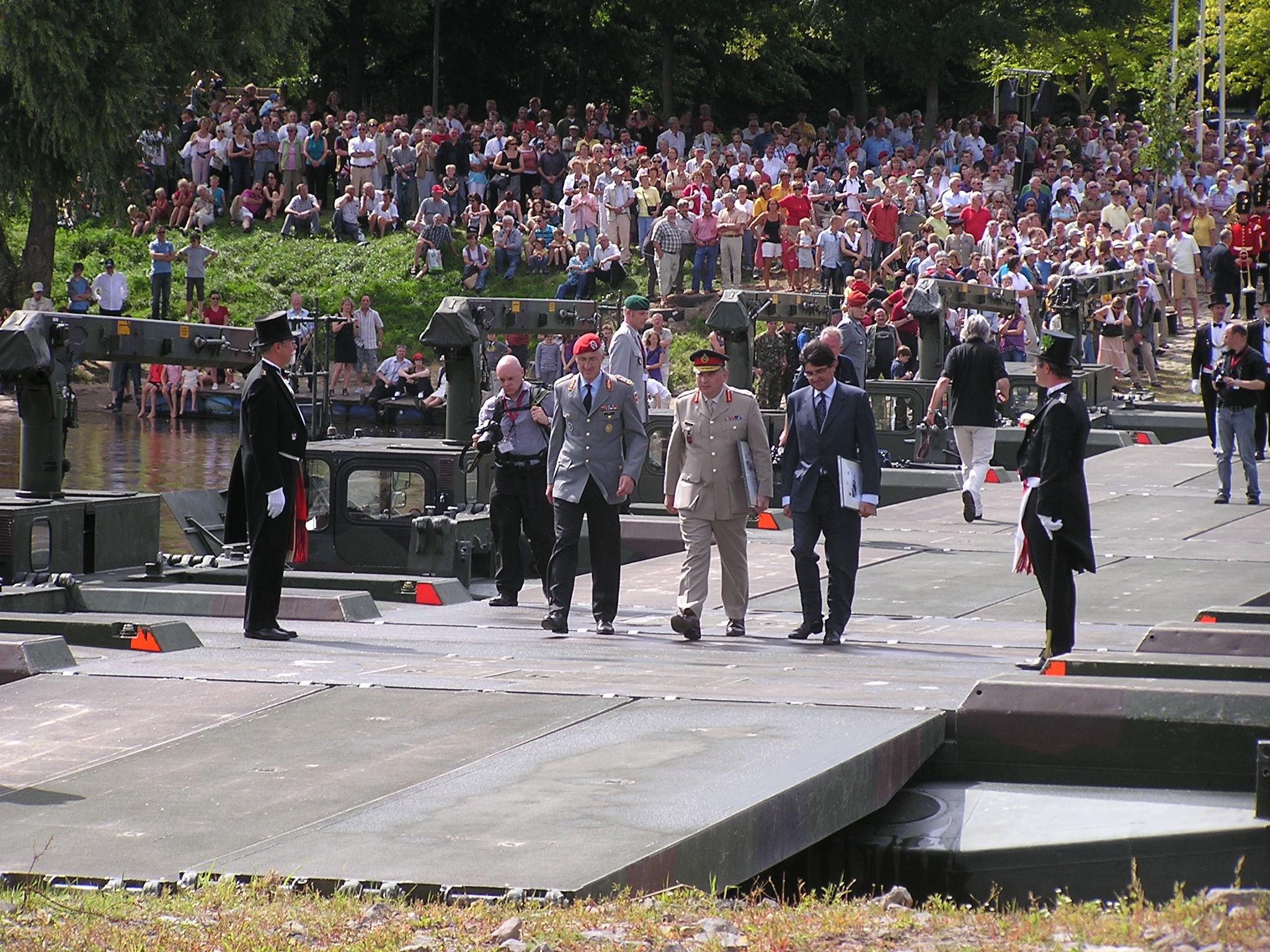
250th anniversary of the Battle of Minden: Mungo Melvin and German General Markus Kneip crossing the Weser.

First established following the Second World War, the forces grew during the Cold War, and consisted, by the early 1980s, of I (BR) Corps made up of four divisions; 1st Armoured Division, 2nd Armoured Division, 3rd Armoured Division and the 4th Armoured Division.

Disbandment of the British Army of the Rhine (BAOR) and Royal Air Force Germany (RAFG) in 1994, following the end of the Cold War and the Options for Change defence review in the early 1990s, reduced the strength of the British Armed Forces in Germany by almost 30,000 with just one division (1st Armoured) remaining by the late 1990s, concentrated in North Rhine-Westphalia. The British presence was estimated to have been contributing 1.5 billion euros annually to the German economy in 2004. Following a further spending review, one brigade was withdrawn and Osnabrück Garrison closed in 2009.

Administrative support for British service personnel in Germany and across continental Europe was delegated to United Kingdom Support Command (Germany), (UKSC(G)). The four Army garrisons in Germany were under the direct administrative control of UKSC(G). The General Officer Commanding UKSC(G) also functioned as head of the British Forces Liaison Organisation (Germany), which was responsible for liaising and maintaining relations with German civil authorities.

Under the 2010 Strategic Defence and Security Review, it was decided that British military units would cease to be permanently deployed in Germany by the end of 2019. This led to a scaling down of the British military presence, and a restructuring of command and support structures.

HQ British Forces Germany was formed in January 2012, replacing the UKSC(G) and the Germany Support Group (GSG). Rhine Garrison, which principally comprised HQ British Forces Germany in the Rheindahlen Military Complex and Elmpt Station (formerly RAF Bruggen), also reduced in size; the HQ moved to Bielefeld in July 2013 and other units returned to the UK. The two central garrisons – Gütersloh and Paderborn – combined to form a single 'super garrison' called Westfalen Garrison in April 2014.

With the departure of Major General John Henderson in March 2015, the Commanding Officer of British Forces Germany became a brigadier's post, with Brigadier Ian Bell assuming command.

In autumn 2019, British Forces Germany effectively closed, with the last military base handed back to the German Bundeswehr in February 2020. However, some training will still be undertaken in Germany with regard to NATO capability.

== Off-duty life ==
The British Forces Broadcasting Service (BFBS) services were widely available on FM across north-western Germany.

The British Army Germany rugby union team regularly played games against emerging rugby nations like Belgium, Denmark, Netherlands, Germany and Luxembourg.

During the height of "the Troubles" in Northern Ireland, the IRA targeted personnel in Germany between 1988 and 1990. The attacks resulted in the deaths of nine people, including three civilians, and many wounded. As a result, vehicles owned by personnel ceased to have distinct registration plates, which had made them easily identifiable. Under Project Albric, implemented in 1988, all right hand drive BFG vehicles were given UK-style plates, while under Project Hagen, implemented in 1990, all left hand drive BFG vehicles were given German-style plates.

== Commanders ==
Commanders have included:
General Officer Commanding United Kingdom Support Command (Germany)

- 1994–1995 Major-General Scott Grant
- 1995–1997 Major-General Christopher Drewry
- 1997–2001 Major-General Christopher Elliott
- 2001–2003 Major-General John Moore-Bick
- 2003–2006 Major-General David Bill
- 2006–2009 Major-General Mungo Melvin
- 2009–2012 Major-General Nicholas Caplin

General Officer Commanding British Forces Germany

- 2012–2015 Major-General John Henderson

Commander British Forces Germany

- 2015–2018 Brigadier Ian Bell
- 2018–2019 Brigadier Richard Clements

Commander British Army Germany

- 2019–2023 Colonel Tim Hill
- 2023 Colonel Mike Foster-Brown

== See also ==
- Germany Guard Service
