= JHQ Rheindahlen =

Former military base in Germany

- Mönchengladbach
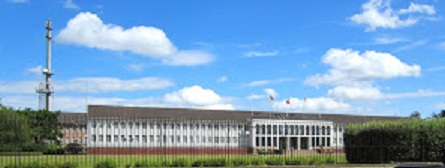
- JHQ Rheindahlen

Site information
- Type: Headquarters and barracks
- Owner: Ministry of Defence
- Operator: British Army

Location
- Location within Germany
- Coordinates: 51.17639°N 6.32167°E

Site history
- Built: 1952
- Built for: War Office
- In use: 1952-2013

Garrison information
- Occupants: British Forces Germany and NATO national contingents

JHQ (Joint Headquarters) Rheindahlen was a military base in Mönchengladbach, North Rhine-Westphalia, Germany active from 1954 to 2013. It functioned as the main headquarters for British forces in Germany and for the NATO Northern Army Group. Latterly it was also known as the Rheindahlen Military Complex, part of Rheindahlen Garrison. It was named after the local village of Rheindahlen, part of the city borough of Mönchengladbach.

== History ==
In 1952, work began on the British Forces Maintenance Area West of the Rhine. Part of the project included the construction of a joint British Army and Royal Air Force headquarters for the British Army of the Rhine (BAOR) in Rheindahlen. Colonel Henry Grattan was Chief Engineer of the construction project.

HQ BAOR moved from Bad Oeynhausen to Rheindahlen in October 1954, centralising headquarters functions previously located across several towns in Northern Germany. It was originally the HQ of the Northern Army Group (NORTHAG), Second Allied Tactical Air Force (2ATAF), British Army of the Rhine (BAOR) and Royal Air Force Germany (RAFG). Some 12,000 military personnel moved to the "town within a town" in a few weeks.

By the early 1970s the facilities in the complex included a NAAFI superstore and a smaller NAAFI store (Buschof NAAFI), German shops, a petrol station (normally BP), a travel agent (Milatravel), two German banks (Commerzbank and Sparkasse), two post offices, dress shop (a Malcolm Club shop), YWCA Bookshop, libraries and cafes. There were separate full British Army (RAMC) and RAF Medical & Dental Centres, five British primary schools (St Georges, St Andrews, St Patricks, St Davids & St Christophers) and a Belgian school. There was one secondary school (initially Queens upper & lower until the senior school moved to Hostert Waldniel, later returning to JHQ and recombining as Windsor School.

JHQ was first bombed by the Provisional IRA in 1973. The car bomb was planted in the Globe cinema car park and timed to go off as the film ended. In the event the film ended early and the car park was largely empty when the bomb exploded. No one was injured, but a couple of cars were damaged. A Dutch man and a woman from Belfast were arrested but their leader, reported to be James McCann, escaped.

Thirty-one people were injured on 23 March 1987 after a 300 lb (140 kg) car bomb exploded near the visitors officers' mess at the top of Queens Avenue. The Provisional IRA later stated it had carried out the bombing.

During the 1990s and 2000s, JHQ housed the Headquarters United Kingdom Support Command (Germany), later Headquarters British Forces Germany, which was the administrative HQ of the British Army in Europe. It was also home to the Allied Rapid Reaction Corps (ARRC), which relocated to Imjin Barracks in Gloucestershire in 2010.

There was an Army Garrison HQ on Collingwood Road to administer the Army element and an RAF HQ (RAF Rheindahlen) on Queens Avenue to administer the RAF element. HQ British Forces Germany moved to Bielefeld in July 2013. The Rheindahlen military complex was handed back to German federal authorities on 13 December 2013.

In July 2015 some Arab investors submitted proposals to convert the site to a leisure park. In September 2015 the main gas, electricity and water services were reconnected from the main Hardt-Rheindahlen road along Queens Avenue to the West boiler house to facilitate temporary use of the site as a refugee reception centre. In November 2015 the site was still a ghost town with civilian security guards and in April 2016 it was revealed that the refugees would be accommodated in the billets area around the parade ground off Beresford Road.

== Headquarters and units ==
A number of separate HQs and units were based at the JHQ complex during its time as a British and NATO base, these included:

=== Headquarters ===
- HQ Northern Army Group (NORTHAG)
- HQ 2nd Allied Tactical Air Force (2 ATAF)
- HQ British Army of the Rhine (BAOR)
- HQ RAF Germany (RAFG)
- HQ United Kingdom Support Command (Germany) (UKSC(G))
- HQ British Forces Germany (BFG)
- HQ ACE Rapid Reaction Corps (ARRC)
- HQ Multinational Division (Central) (MND(C))

=== Individual units and organisations ===
- British Services Security Organisation (Germany)
- Intelligence & Security Group (Germany)
- 16 Signal Regiment
- Support Battalion, HQ ARRC
- 32 Postal & Courier Squadron Royal Engineers
- 101 Provost Company Royal Military Police
- 68 Squadron Royal Corps of Transport
- 29 Company Women's Royal Army Corps
- Various NATO national support elements

== See also ==
- British Army of the Rhine
- Kent School, Hostert
- Windsor School, formerly Queens School
