= Rheindahlen =

Town in Germany's North Rhine-Westphalia

- Stadtteil of Mönchengladbach
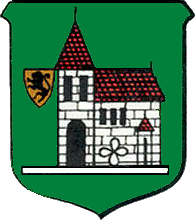
- Coat of arms

- Location of Rheindahlen within Mönchengladbach
- Interactive map of Rheindahlen
- Location within Germany Location within North Rhine-Westphalia
- Coordinates: 51°09′01″N 06°21′42″E
- Country: Germany
- State: North Rhine-Westphalia
- City: Mönchengladbach

Area
  - Total: 3.237 km^{2} (1.250 sq mi)
- Elevation: 65–80 m (213–262 ft)

Population (2008-12-31)
  - Total: 27,363
  - Density: 8,453/km^{2} (21,890/sq mi)
- Time zone: UTC+01:00 (CET)
  - Summer (DST): UTC+02:00 (CEST)
- Postal codes: 41179
- Dialling codes: 02161

Rheindahlen (called Dalen from the Early Middle Ages to the Early Modern Period around 1700, and Dahlen until 1878) is a town in the western and largest borough of the city of Mönchengladbach in the German state of North Rhine-Westphalia. Since the reorganisation of Monchengladbach's boroughs (Stadtbezirke) on 22 October 2009 Rheindahlen has been part of Mönchengladbach West. From the granting of Nideggen town rights in 1354 until the incorporation of the mayoralty of Rheindahlen into M.-Gladbach on 30 June 1921, the place was an independent town.

In 1878, the town was renamed from Dahlen to Rheindahlen in the Prussian Province of Düsseldorf by order of Emperor [[[Wilhelm I]]. Its renaming was primarily for postal reasons in order to avoid confusing the Dahlen in the Rhine Province with the municipality of Dahlen in Saxony within the North German Postal Zone. Its old name linguistically meant Delle or "hollow", which refers to the location of the village in a depression.

== Geography ==
=== Location and surrounding area ===
Rheindahlen is located in Mönchengladbach West, the largest urban district in the city of Mönchengladbach. It lies to the south-west of the main urban area and borders on the municipality of Schwalmtal to the west and the county of Heinsberg to the southwest. Its neighbouring communities within the borough of Mönchengladbach are Hardt to the north, Rheydt to the east and Wickrath to the south. The centre of Rheindahlen is about 7.5 kilometres southwest of the city centre of Mönchengladbach.

=== Landscape and geology ===
Around Rheindahlen, the landscape is dominated by the western foothills of Jülich-Zülpich Börde. It is situated on the southern edge of the Lower Rhine Plain on the Schwalm-Nette Plateau which, in the western part of the borough is characterised by wetlands and woods. To the south is the source region of the Niers. The Rheindahlen landscape lies on the southern edge of the Mönchengladbach Loam Plain and rises towards the south. Its lowest point measures 65 m above NN, its highest point is 80 m above NN. The village itself is 70–73 m above NN.

Geologically, the area belongs to the Lower Rhine Bay on whose western edge it lies. Its topmost soil layer consists mainly of loess which is highly suitable for agriculture and which was deposited during the last ice age in a layer up to 10 metres thick on the gravels and sands of the Rhine. Beneath this upper layer are gravels, sands, clays, and brown coal strata of the Tertiary. The brown coal seams of the Lower Rhine Bay are very thick in places and are mined in large open-cast pits (in the area of Rheindalen in the Garzweiler Mine); The brown coal seam of Morken has, for example, a thickness of around 150 metres. In permeable beds, such as gravel and sands, groundwater is present on several superimposed levels. These levels are separated by relatively impermeable layers of silt and clay.

The groundwater is pumped out by wells and drainage measures around the opencast mine of Garzweiler. This extraction of the groundwater results in widespread mining damage as a result of subsidence. In some cases, the drainage even causes movements on the otherwise inactive geological faults which subdivide the Lower Rhine Bay. The "Rheindahlen Fault", which runs an east-west direction, has moved as a result of the drainage measures. It runs from the direction of the former British base of JHQ Rheindahlen to the district Rheydt and is responsible for mining damage due to lowering of the groundwater and the resulting sedimentary movements along the Rheydt and Günhoven fault blocks on the territory of Monchengladbach.

=== Climate ===
The climate of Rheindahlen is influenced in particular by the Atlantic Gulf Stream and its location within the transition between the maritime and continental climatic zones. Precipitation occurs in all seasons and the prevailing wind comes from the south-west. Annual rainfall is around 730 millimetres, with July being the most precipitous and September being the least precipitous month. Summers are usually warm and winters, due to maritime climate, mild. In July, the mean temperature is 20 °C, in January it is 0.5 °C. The duration of the cold period with minimum temperatures below 0 °C is on average less than 60 days, the number of summer days with temperatures above 25 °C is 30 days, with an additional eight "tropical" days with daytime temperatures of more than 30 °C and night temperatures above 20 °C, and a total of 20 days can be expected with thunderstorms.

=== Subdivisions ===
The former borough of Rheindahlen (since 2009 Mönchengladbach West) consists of the nine districts of Wickrath-Mitte, Wickrath-West, Wickrathberg, Wanlo, Hehn, Holt, Hauptquartier, Rheindahlen-Land and Rheindahlen-Mitte.

Whilst Rheindahlen-Mitte is limited to the town intself and the surrounding streets and residential areas that grew up after the Second World War, Rheindahlen-Land covers 36 so-called Honschaften around the centre of Rheindahlen, as follows:

Honschaften, Rheindahlen-Land; Mönchengladbach, Stadtbezirk West
Overview map of Rheindahlen-Land in the Monchengladbach borough
Overview map of Rheindahlen-Land in the Monchengladbach borough	Bau	Gerkerathwinkel	Merreter
Overview map of Rheindahlen-Land in the Monchengladbach borough	Baum	Griesbarth	Peel
Overview map of Rheindahlen-Land in the Monchengladbach borough	Broich	Grotherath	Saas
Overview map of Rheindahlen-Land in the Monchengladbach borough	Dorthausen	Günhoven	Schriefers
Overview map of Rheindahlen-Land in the Monchengladbach borough	Eickelnberg	Herdt	Schriefersmühle
Overview map of Rheindahlen-Land in the Monchengladbach borough	Gatzweiler	Hilderath	Sittard
Overview map of Rheindahlen-Land in the Monchengladbach borough	Genhausen	Knoor	Sittardheide
Overview map of Rheindahlen-Land in the Monchengladbach borough	Genhodder	Koch	Viehstraße
Overview map of Rheindahlen-Land in the Monchengladbach borough	Genholland	Kothausen	Voosen
Overview map of Rheindahlen-Land in the Monchengladbach borough	Genhülsen	Mennrath	Wolfsittard
Overview map of Rheindahlen-Land in the Monchengladbach borough	Gerkerath	Mennrathheide	Woof
Overview map of Rheindahlen-Land in the Monchengladbach borough	Gerkerathmühle	Mennrathschmidt	Wyenhütte
Overview map of Rheindahlen-Land in the Monchengladbach borough	Information about Monchengladbach's boroughs and districts

In 1833 the following Honschaften were part of the mayoralty of Rheindahlen:

- The hamlets of: Bau, Baum, Bockert (not Bockert which is part of Viersen), Dorthausen, Eickelnberg, Genhausen, Genhodder, Griesbart, Grotherath, Günhoverhütte, Knoor, Kothausen, Mennratherheid, Saas, Schmidt, Schrievers, Viehstraß, Winkel
- The villages of: Broich, Genhülsen, Gerkerath, Günhoven, Koch, Mennrath. Wolfsittard
- The Honschaften of: Aufm Feldchen, Gatzweiler, Genholland, Herdt, Hilderath, Merreter, Sittard, Sittardheid, Voosen, Woof, Wyenhütt
- The farms of: Gennenhöfchen, Martinenhöfchen, Südderatherhof
- The mills of: Gerkerathermühle (windmill), Knippertzmühle (water mill), Schriefersmühle (windmill), Vollmühle (water mill)
- The isolated houses of: Peel, An der Stappen

The postal code of Rheindahlen is 41179. Until the introduction of five-digit post codes it was 4050 Mönchengladbach 5.

== History ==
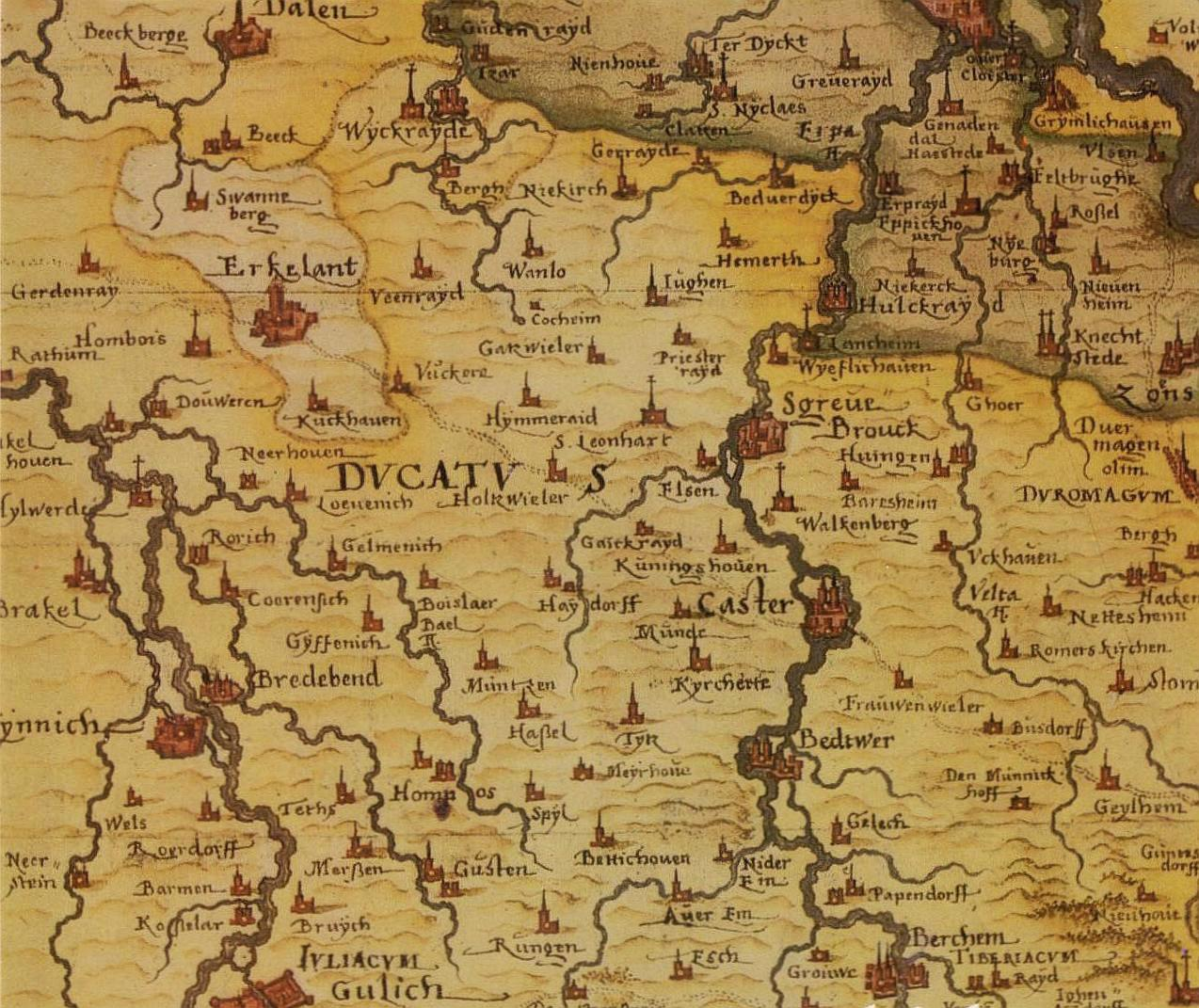
1557 map of the Lower Rhine region, between the Rhine, Erft and Rur with the village of Dalen in the north

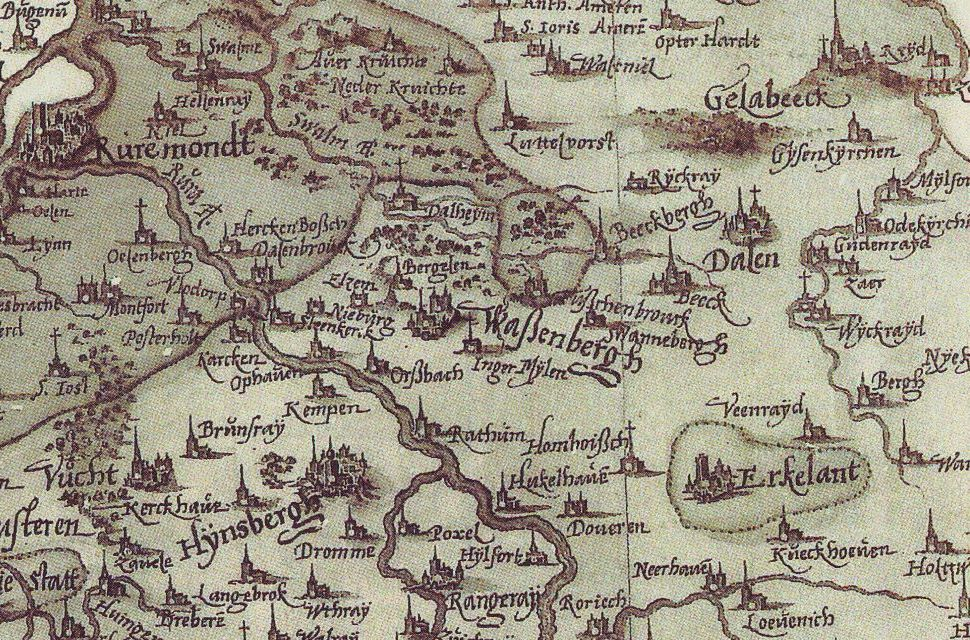
Dalen in the manuscript atlas by Christian Sgrothen, before 1573

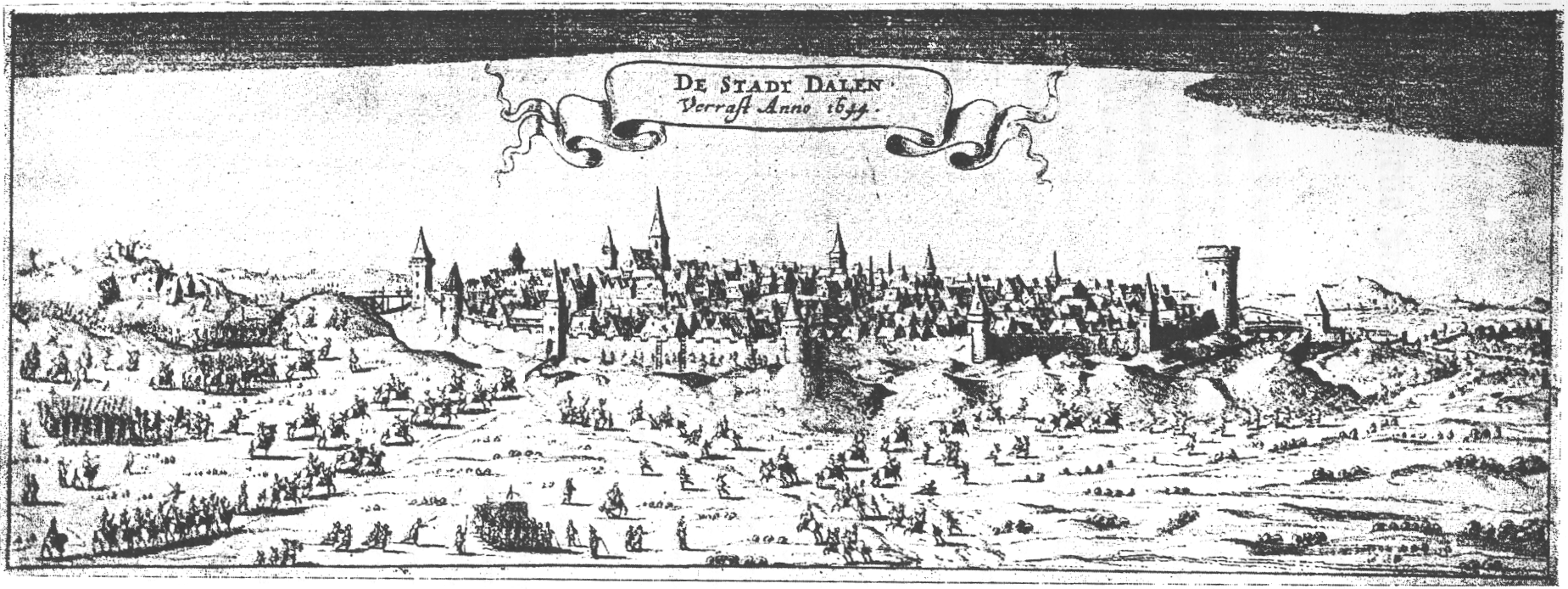
Fanciful portrayal of the town at the time of the Hessian plundering on 9 May 1644. The clearly Dutch engraving is taken from the left hand side of the depiction by Frans Hogenberg. The copperplate engraver can have had no knowledge of the town, as can be seen from the incorrect number of towers and the town wall with arrow slits and battlement gables.

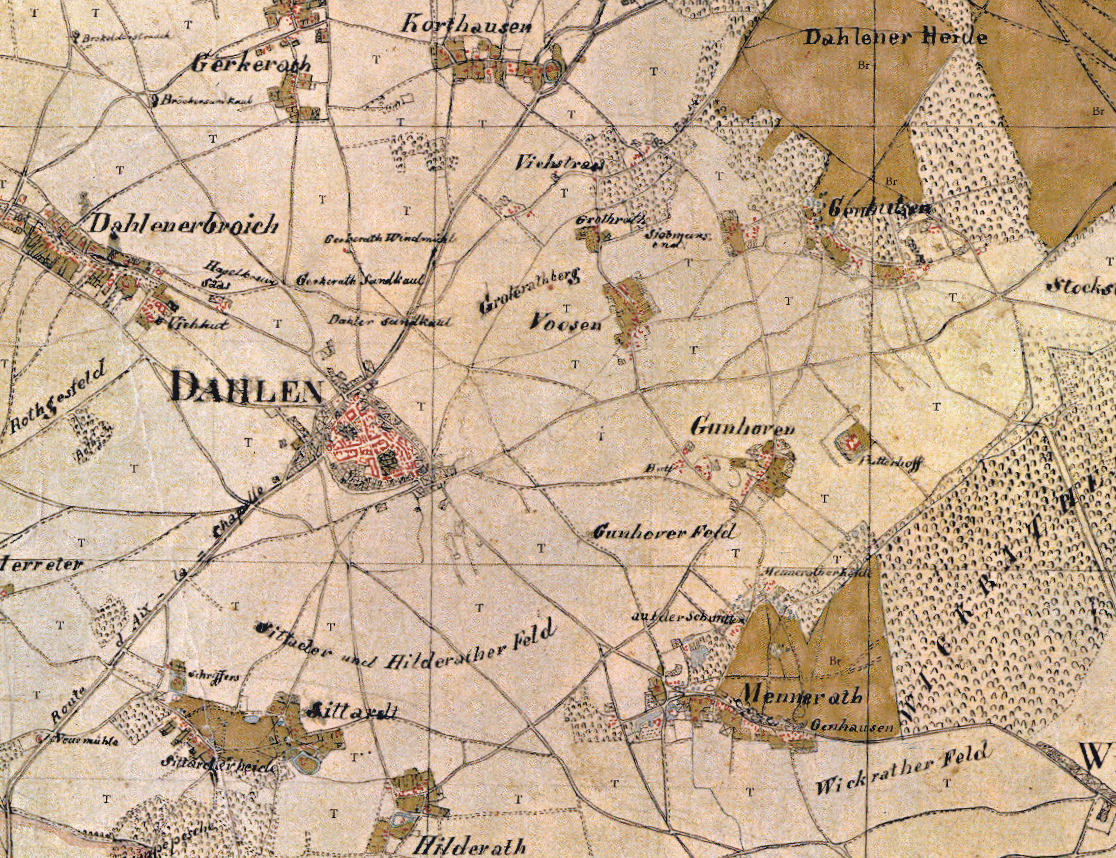
Dahlen and surroundings on the 1806/07 Tranchot map

=== Pre- and early history ===
The remains of settlements from the Old and New Stone Ages, between 220,000 and 120,000 BC, have been found in Rheindahlen. They could be fossils of Homo erectus (Homo heidelbergensis) and Neandertal Man. Rheindahlen is also an extremely rich site for fossil remains that have survived in the soil which is mainly clay. In archaeological circles the site has been nationally well known since 1908. In the recent past, in the southern part of the borough, near an old brickworks, archaeological excavations took place that have contributely decisively to the understanding of the hunting and settlement areas of Neandertal man. A thirteen-fold enlarged bronze replica of the hand hammer found in 1994 has been on display in the centre of Rheindahlen since 2003; it recalls the early history of the village.

From the 3rd century A.D. a Roman settlement is known to have existed in the Hardt Forest to the north. This was discovered in 1954 during the construction of the NATO Headquarters northwest of Rheindahlen. Clues as to Roman settlements were found inter alia at Genholland, Genhülsen, Griesbarth, Hilderath, Merreter and Peel, including a 2nd-century, metre-high matrona stone discovered in 1961 and probably the remains of a road. In 2010, excavations uncovered cellar vaults and buildings which were dated to the period from the 10th to the 13th centuries. In addition there were early mediaeval motte castles in Mennrath, Sittard and Schriefershof.

=== Etymology ===
The original name of Rheindahlen was Dale, which appeared probably in the 9th or 10th centuries when terrain names for settlements was common. The word Dale is derived in this case from Dal, which means "valley" or "hollow" and is similar to the English word "dale".

Whilst the name Dalen was used until around 1500 and at the latest until 1700, it changed in the early 18th century to Dahlen. Due to the number of places with the name Dahl, Dalheim, Dalem and Dalhem it became increasingly difficult for postal services, which began around 1870, to distinguish between the individual settlements. Because of the location of Dahlen in the Rhine Province of Prussia, it was decided to rename the town Rheindahlen. This was authorised by an act by the Prussian king, William I dated 24 December 1877. The act was published in the Prussian Ministerial Record on 15 February 1878.

In the early 20th century the municipal authorities of the town of Rheindahlen advised that Rheindahlen should be incorporated into the town of Gladbach. The then Lord Mayor of Gladbach, Hermann Piecq planned the incorporation of Neuwerk, Gladbach-Land and Rheindahlen. This happened on 18 July 1921 and thus Rheindahlen lost its independence and from then on was called M.Gladbach-Rheindahlen. After the Second World War the name became Rheindahlen.

=== Manorialism ===
Dalen was first mentioned in 861 as a village (Lat.: villa) in the Mühlgau (Lat.: pago molense), which belonged to the Bishopric of Liège. Six years later it is recorded as Dalon, a clearance settlement probably on a royal estate in the time of the Carolingians. Etymologically Dalen derives from Delle or "small valley". In the archives of Prüm Abbey is the copy of a document according to which King Lothair II exchanged goods and estates on 20 January 867 with Otbert, a vassal of Count II from the Eifelgau. Amongst other things, the king transferred to him in the Moselgau in the March of wanolon an Amt as a fief of Sigar:

in pago moslense in commarca wanolon benificium Sigari…

Due to this translation error, Dalon was incorrectly held to be the present day Rheindahlen. However, it is more likely that Spangdahlem near Prüm in the Eifel was meant. A clue to that are the surviving records of the Cologne abbey of Cunibert, which describe tithe rights of the abbey in Wehlen on the Moselle. Another indication that Dalon was not the later Dahlen is reinforced by the fact that neither in the present day Rheindahlen itself nor the surrounding villages have any traces from the time of the Carolingians or the Merovingians been found.
