= Kent School, Hostert =

Coordinates: 51°12′34.83″N 6°18′15.72″E

Kent School
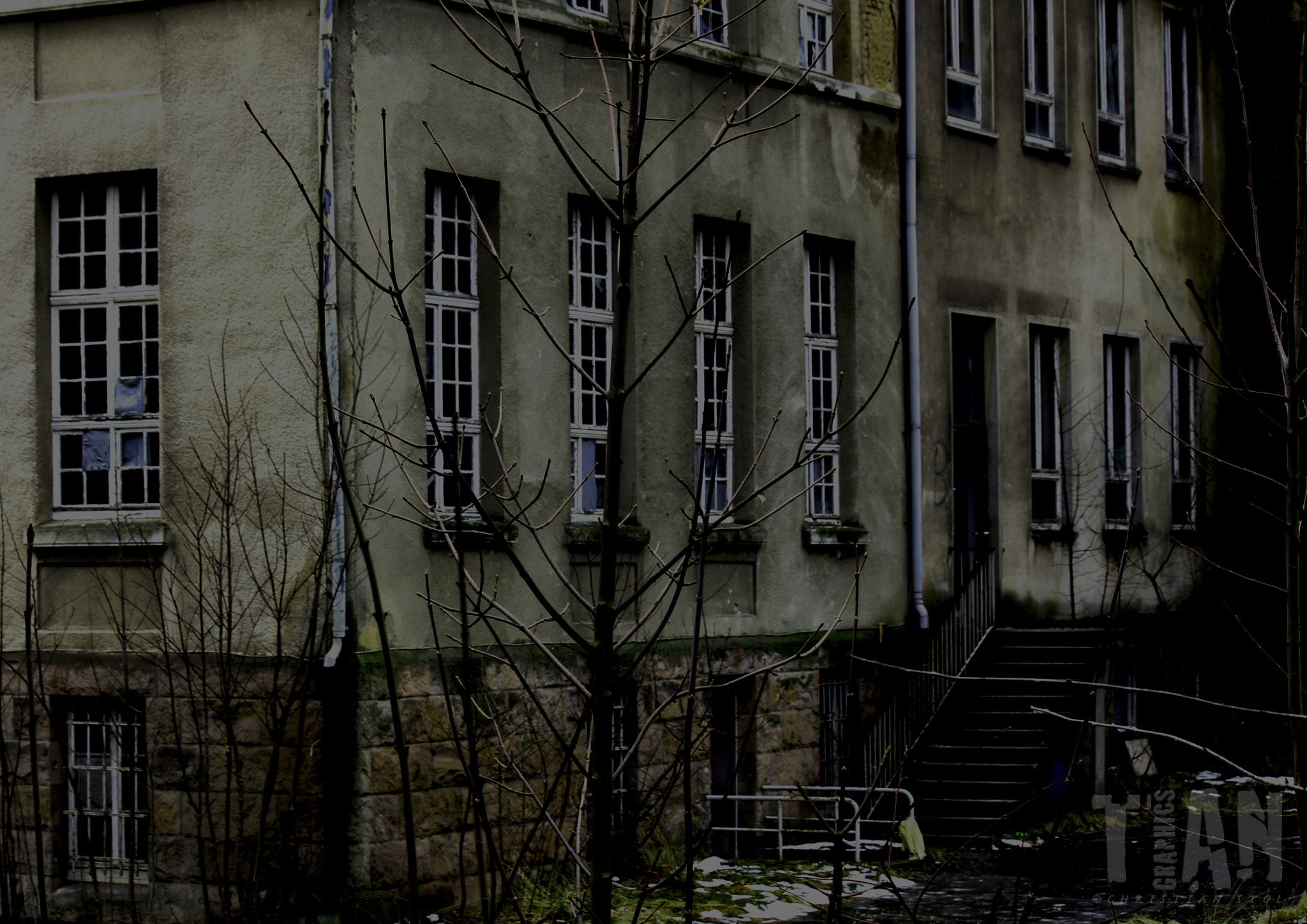
- View of one of the derelict school buildings
- Hostert, North Rhine-Westphalia, BFPO 40; Germany

Information
- Type: SCE school
- Established: 1963
- Closed: 1992
- Local authority: SCE
- Ofsted: Reports
- Gender: Coeducational
- Age: 11 to 18
- Enrolment: 1,100
- Website: http://discovery.nationalarchives.gov.uk/browse/r/h/C8126113

Kent School was a British secondary school in Germany, with boarding facilities, for the children of military personnel. It was located near the military complex at JHQ Rheindahlen, at Hostert, near Mönchengladbach. The school operated from 1963 until 1988 when it was amalgamated with Queens School, Rheindahlen, to become Windsor School. It was one of several secondary schools in Germany operated by the Service Children's Education organization.

== History ==
=== Background ===
The school was based in a former Franciscan priory, St. Josefsheim, built in 1913, that closed in 1937 and was then used by the Nazis, as Waldniel Institute, as part of their child euthanasia programme. In 1952, the Allies were establishing a new headquarters in Hardt Forest just outside the city of Mönchengladbach which became a major base for both British and NATO forces - notably the HQs of the 2nd Allied Tactical Air Force, Northern Army Group and British Army of the Rhine. The base was known as the Joint Headquarters and effectively became a suburb of Mönchengladbach. NATO referred to it as JHQ Rheindahlen. It was the families of these personnel that Kent School was to serve as a day school; it also had a boarding facility for children whose parents were in other locations that were not served by secondary schools.

=== School history ===
Initially, however, the buildings were rented by the British for use as a hospital, the British Military Hospital Hostert. It was not until 1963, when the existing Queens School in Rheindahlen was "bursting at the seams" that the requirement for another secondary school arose. What became RAF Wegberg, south of JHQ Rheindahlen, was identified as a better site for the hospital, so the medical facilities were moved there and the site at Hostert became Kent School, a secondary, co-educational, boarding school for the British Forces in Germany and worldwide.

This involved a major redevelopment: a gymnasium and swimming pool were constructed, as well as a bus park for school buses. During the redevelopment work, human remains were uncovered - the bodies of patients who had died - or been killed - at the Nazi-run Institute which had been housed here during the war.

The school numbers burgeoned, even reaching 6,000 at one point, but were generally around 850-1000. The Gothic appearance of the school led to it being nicknamed Colditz by the British, after the infamous prisoner-of-war camp in East Germany. During the late 1960s one of the outbuildings overlooking the outdoor netball playing area, was taken over by the Navy, Army and Air Force Institutes(NAAFI) as a staff hostel housing around 15 managers and charge hands. The hostel was fully equipped with kitchen and dining facilities, lounge etc. The hostel was closed in the 1980s and later the whole building was demolished.

In 1988, as part of a re-structuring, Kent School was merged with Queens School in Rheindahlen to become known as Windsor School but still operating across the two sites. In 1993, as a result of the end of the Cold War and the reduction of Allied Forces in Germany, the site at Hostert was closed and it was returned to the German authorities.

== Alumni ==
Notable Kent School alumni include:

- Baroness Scott of Needham Market
- Timothy Simmons, CVO, former British ambassador

== See also ==
- Gloucester School, Hohne
- Kings School, Gütersloh
- Prince Rupert School, Rinteln
- Windsor School, Rheindahlen

== Literature ==
- Margaine, Sylvain and David Margaine (2009). "Kent School" in Forbidden places: explorations insolites d'un patrimoine oublié, Volume 1. pp. 116–119.
- St John Williams, N. T. Tommy Atkins' children; the story of the education of the army's children, 1675-1970. Great Britain. Ministry of Defence, HMSO (1971), pp. 221–222.
