= Service Children's Education =

UK education service for children of the Armed Forces

Agency overview
- Formed: 1997 (under current name)
- Preceding agency: British Families Education Service
- Parent agency: Ministry of Defence
- Website: SCE

Service Children's Education (SCE) was an organisation of the United Kingdom government responsible for the education of the children of British Armed Forces families and Ministry of Defence (MoD) personnel serving outside of the United Kingdom. They provided schools and educational support services from Foundation Stage through to sixth form. They are headquartered at Trenchard Lines, Upavon, Wiltshire.

It was previously an executive agency of the MoD, but this status was removed on 31 March 2013 following the reduction of service personnel based abroad. However, it continued to operate under the SCE name as part of the MoD's Directorate Children and Young People (DCYP).

At one point the organization's mission was taken over by DCYP, which was created in 2010. In 2021 DCYP was separated into two organisations: Defence Children Services (DCS) and Armed Forces Families and Safeguarding (AFFS).

== History ==
During the 1980s, the British Families Education Service (BFES) was renamed Service Children's School (SCS). In 1997 it took its current name Service Children's Education (SCE). Despite the various changes to the name and administration, it continues the mission of its predecessors: providing education for the children of British Armed Forces personnel. Former teachers who taught in SCE schools or under its previous incarnations the BFES and SCS may join the BFES/SCE Association.

In 2001 a collection of archives of the British Families Education Service / Service Children's Education Association was deposited at UCL Special Collections. The papers can be used to research the history of the schools and the lives of the teachers working in them. UCL Special Collections does not hold the official records of the British Families Education Service (BFES), Service Children's Schools (SCS) or Service Children's Education (SCE). These were the formal bodies responsible for the education of children of British Forces and the Ministry of Defence personnel stationed outside of the UK. The formal records are held by The National Archives. Log books of some schools are held by the National Army Museum.

== Management ==
=== Headquarters and offices ===
SCE were headquartered at Trenchard Lines, Upavon, Wiltshire. The business support office are co-located with that of the Children's Education and Advisory Service since August 2012.

SCE was headquartered in the Wegberg Military Complex in Wegberg, Germany, until 2012. It briefly moved to JHQ Rheindahlen, until that base closed, too, in 2013.

In addition SCE had offices in Bielefeld, Germany and Episkopi Cantonment, Cyprus.

== Curriculum ==
Schools follow the English National Curriculum, administer national assessments and public examinations, and are inspected by His Majesty's Inspectorate, via Ofsted. Teachers have recognised UK professional qualifications and the majority are recruited specially from the United Kingdom through the Civil Service.

== Schools ==
The agency operates primary and secondary schools in Europe and Asia and also provides educational facilities in territories such as the Falklands and Gibraltar where there is a significant British military presence. The schools are typically grouped by garrison (including its outlying bases).

Schools are:

Belgium

- SHAPE Primary School (British section), Supreme Headquarters Allied Powers Europe, Belgium

Brunei

- Treetops Early Years Setting and Hornbill Primary School (Seria)

Cyprus

- King Richard Secondary School, Dhekelia
- St. John's Secondary School, Episkopi
- Akrotiri Early Years Setting and Akrotiri Primary School, RAF Akrotiri
- Ayios Nikolaos Early Years Setting and Ayios Nikolaos Primary School, Ayios Nikolaos Station
- Dhekelia Early Years Setting and Dhekelia Primary School
- Episkopi Early Years Setting and Episkopi Primary School

Falkland Islands

- Mount Pleasant Primary School, RAF Mount Pleasant, Falklands

Germany

- Attenborough Early Years and Attenborough Primary School (Sennelager)
- St David’s Primary School (Ramstein)

Gibraltar

- Sunflowers Early Years Setting and St Christopher’s Early Years Foundation Stage

Italy

- BFS Naples Primary School, Italy

Netherlands

- AFNORTH Primary School (Brunssum)

=== Former Schools ===
==== Germany ====
Secondary schools

- Cornwall School, Dortmund
- Edinburgh School, Münster
- Gloucester School, Hohne (closed July 2015)
- Havel School, RAF Gatow, Berlin. Closed 1994. Was also the primary school until the building of Gatow First school in 1977
- Kent School, Hostert, near Schwalmtal (boarding school) (closed 1993)
- King Alfred School, Plön (closed 1959)
- King's School, Gütersloh (closed 2019)
- Prince Rupert School, Rinteln (closed July 2014)
- Windsor Boys' School, Hamm (boarding school) (closed 1983)
- Windsor Girls' School, Hamm (boarding school)
- Windsor School, formerly Queen's School, Rheindahlen (closed July 2013)
- Virtual Tour of the Windsor School / Windsor Boys School Hamm, Germany

Primary/middle schools

- Alanbrooke Primary, Dortmund, BFPO20
- Andrew Humphrey School, WWildenrath (closed 2012)
- Ark Primary School, JHQ Rheindahlen (closed July 2013)
- Attenborough First School, Sennelager
- Attenborough Primary School, Sennelager
- Ayrshire Barracks Primary School, Mönchengladbach
- Bad Salzuflen School, Bad Salzuflen
- Bader First School, RAF Brüggen
- BFES Germany RAF Borgentreich
- Bielefeld School, Bielefeld
- Bishopspark First School, Paderborn
- Blankenhagen School, Gütersloh
- Brüggen School, Elmpt, formerly RAF Bruggen (closed July 2015)
- Buckeburg Primary School, Buckeburg (now Immanuel Schule Schaumburg)

Bünde Primary School

- Cambridge Infant School, Münster
- Cheshire Middle School, RAF Bruggen
- Charlottenburg First School (closed 1990s) – Its facilities was taken over by the newly founded Berlin British School in 1994.
- Churchill School (with annex in Kiel), Verden. Closed 1993
- Dalton Middle School, Düsseldorf
- Derby School, Osnabrück (closed 2008)
- Fleming Primary School, Enger
- Gatow First School Berlin, Headmaster John Hancock (1977-1994), (school closed on 4 November 1994)
- Griffon School, RAF Wildenrath (became Andrew Humphrey School in c1992)
- Haig Primary School, Gütersloh
- Hakedahl Primary School, Detmold
- Hameln School, Hameln
- Hampshire School, Monchengladbach. Closed 2001
- Hamm Primary
- Hannover Primary School
- Hastenbeck Primary School, Hastenbeck
- Heide School, Fallingbostel
- Hemer Primary School
- Herford Primary School, Herford (split into Lister and Fleming)

Hildesheim Primary School

- Hobart Primary School, Detmold
- Iserlohn Primary School
- Jerboa Primary School, Soltau
- John Buchan Middle School, Sennelager
- John Buchan School, Sennelager (closed 2019)
- Krefeld Primary School (closed in 2002) – It is now the site of Franz-Stollwerck-Schule.
- Lancaster School, Minden
- Lippstadt Primary School, Lippstadt
- Lister Primary School, Herford (closed in July 2015)
- Maas First school, RAF Laarbruch
- Marlborough School, Osnabrück
- Merlin School, RAF Wildenrath (closed in 1991)
- Möhne Primary School, Soest
- Montgomery School, Hohne
- Mountbatten Primary School, Celle
- Oxford Primary School, Münster (closed in 2013)
- Pegasus Primary School, RAF Wildenrath
- Rhine Middle School, RAF Laarbruch
- Robert Browning School, Paderborn
- Scott School Fallingbostel
- Shackleton School, Fallingbostel
- Sir John Mogg Primary School, Detmold (closed July 2014)
- Slim School, Bergen
- Spandau Primary School, Berlin
- St Andrew's Primary School, Rheindahlen
- St Barbara's Primary School, Wulfen
- St Christopher's Primary School, Rheindahlen
- St Clements Primary School, Wickrath
- St David's Junior School, Rheindahlen
- St David's Primary School, Ramstein
- St George's Primary School, Rheindahlen
- St Patrick's Primary School, Rheindahlen
- St. Peter's Primary School, Lübbecke
- Suffolk School, Minden
- Talavera Primary School, Werl
- Tower School, Dülmen
- Trenchard School, Gütersloh
- Victoria School, Dortmund
- Wavell Primary School, Bergen
- Wellington First School, Osnabrück
- Wetter Primary School, Wetter (Ruhr)
- Wildenrath Primary, Wildenrath
- William Wordsworth First School, Sennelager
- York Junior School, Münster

==== Gilbraltar ====
- St. Christopher's Middle School, Gibraltar

==== Hong Kong ====
- Gun Club Hill Primary School, Hong Kong
- Minden Row Junior School, Kowloon, Hong Kong
- Sek Kong Primary School, New Territories, Hong Kong
- St. Andrew's Primary School, Kowloon, Hong Kong
- Stanley Fort Primary School, Hong Kong
- St George's School (closed 1996) – The Australian International School Hong Kong uses some of its former facilities.,
- Victoria Junior School, Victoria Barracks, Hong Kong

==== Singapore ====
Secondary schools

- Alexandra Grammar School. Later merged into Bourne School, it is now the site of ISS International School Preston campus.
- Bourne School
- Alexandra/Gillman Secondary Modern School – later merged into Bourne School, the former compound (including Gillman Barracks) is now occupied by an art gallery, the NTU Contemporary Art Singapore (NTU CCA), and other small businesses.
- St John's School. In 1971, the United World College of South East Asia, then known as the Singapore International School, was established at St John's former campus; it adopted its present name in 1975.

Primary schools

- Alexandra Junior School
- Changi Junior School
- Nee Soon Primary School
- Pasir Panjang Junior School
- Seletar Junior School
- Tengah Junior School

===== Infants schools =====
- Tanglin Infants School, Tanglin Barracks, Dempsey Road
- Alexandra Infant School

Pasir Panjang Infant School

==== Malta ====
Infants schools

- Army Children's School St Andrew's Pembroke
- Royal Naval School Verdala (now the Liceo Guzeppi Despott Junior Boys Lyceum)
- RAF Luqa
- RAF School for Infants Safi
- St David's Mtarfa
- Army Children's School Tigne

Secondary schools

- Royal Naval School Tal Handaq (now the Liceo Vassalli Junior Lyceum)

==== Other countries ====
Colony of Aden (now in Yemen)

- Khormaksar School, RAF Khormaksar

Belgium

- Emblem Primary School, Antwerp

Belize

- Toucan School, BATSUB (closed 2011)

Brunei

- BSCS Berakas
- BSCS Muara

Malaysia

- Bourne School, Kuala Lumpur
- Slim School, Cameron Highlands (1951–64, re-opened in Malacca in 1965 at Terendak Camp)
- The Army School, Johore Bahru, Malaysia

Norway

- St George's School, Bekkestua, Oslo

Nepal

- Dharan school, Dharan camp

== See also ==
- British Families Education Service
- Naval Education Service
- Queen's Army Schoolmistresses
- Royal Army Educational Corps
