= St Andrew's Service Children's Primary School (Malta) =

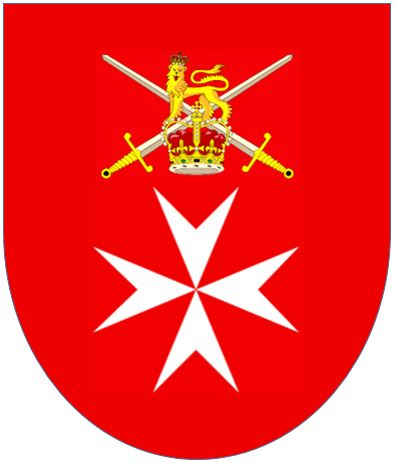
Cross of the Order of St John on a red background and the British Army emblem, was the Army Children's School Malta Crest.

St Andrews's School was a primary school located within the British Army garrison at Pembroke on the island of Malta. The school opened in 1908 as part of St Andrew's barracks an integrated garrison development at Pembroke It would serve as a primary school for army and families based in the Pembroke Garrison, closing in 1978 as the UK drew down its forces on Malta. After 70 years of educational activity at the site the school buildings and grounds were handed over to the Maltese Government.

As with many British Families Education Services schools, St Andrew's operated a house system based on the names of eminent British Army generals and colours: the St Andrew's house system consisted of Montogomery (red), Gort (yellow), Wavell (green) and Alexander (blue). In 1969 the provision of dependant children's education along single service lines was done away with and a single system of overseas schooling provision began as the Service Children's Education Authority. The school was able to use the adjacent garrison sports fields and other local welfare facilities, such as the swimming and diving pools at the Robb Lido at St George's Bay.

There is no British school alumni association at present, although the school is mentioned on the alumni association websites of the Royal Naval and Royal Air Force Schools of Malta.

The school site was repurposed as a local girl's secondary school by the Maltese government (the Sir Luigi Preziosi Girls Secondary School).

The school's original administrative and class room block is still in use and the carved pediment 1908 date stone still clearly visible from road passing the school and on Google Streetview, although much the school grounds and neighbouring garrison sports pitches have been redeveloped into the ultra modern National Sport School.

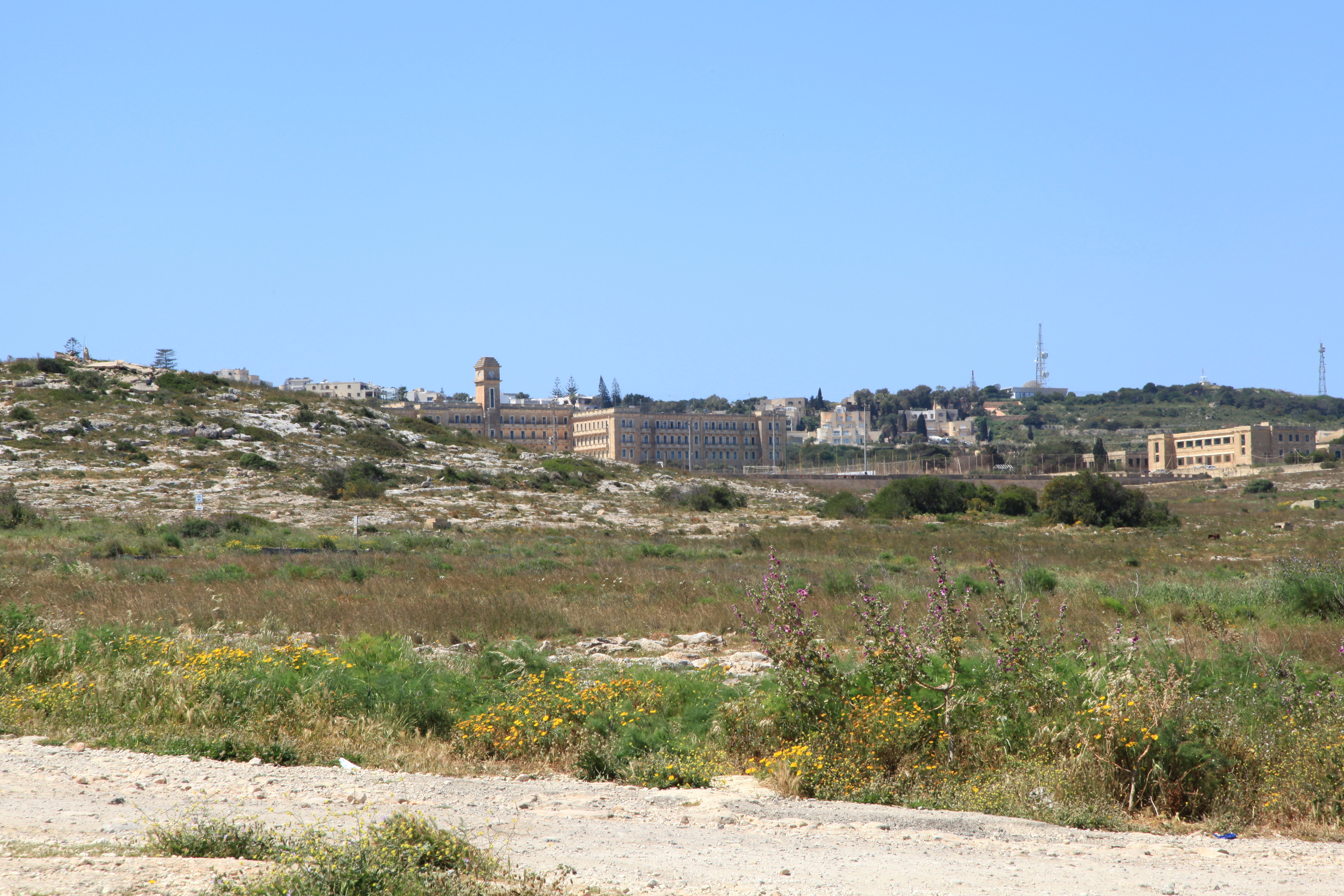
Looking from Pembroke Ranges (behind St Andrew's Barracks) up to St Patrick's Barracks (in the background), service children from both barracks were pupils at the school.

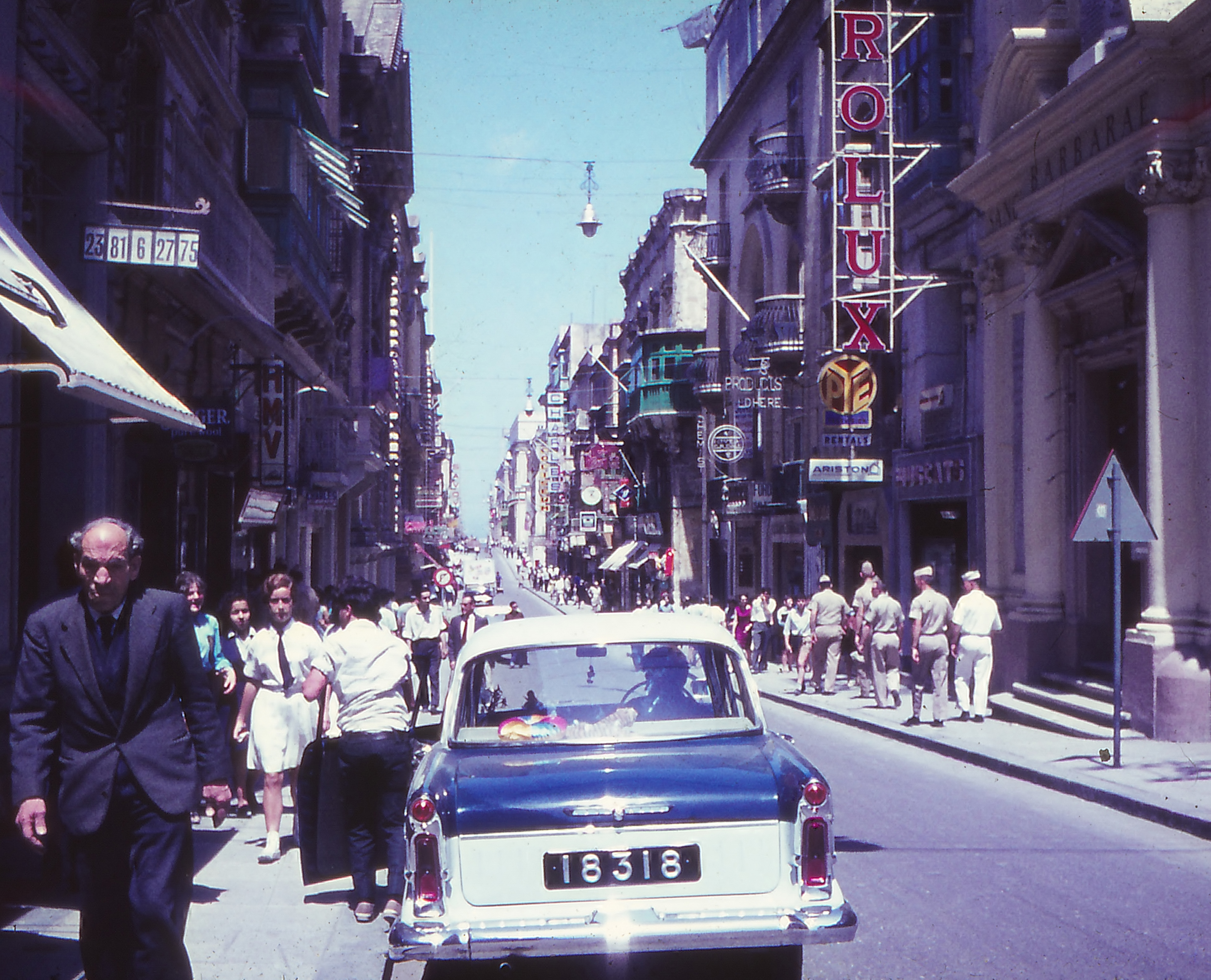
Kingsway in Valletta in 1967; a trip to the capital was always a great event for service children from remote Pembroke

== See also ==
- Royal Naval School Tal-Handaq
- British Families Education Service
- Royal Army Educational Corps
- Queen's Army Schoolmistresses
- Military brat
