= Berlin British School =

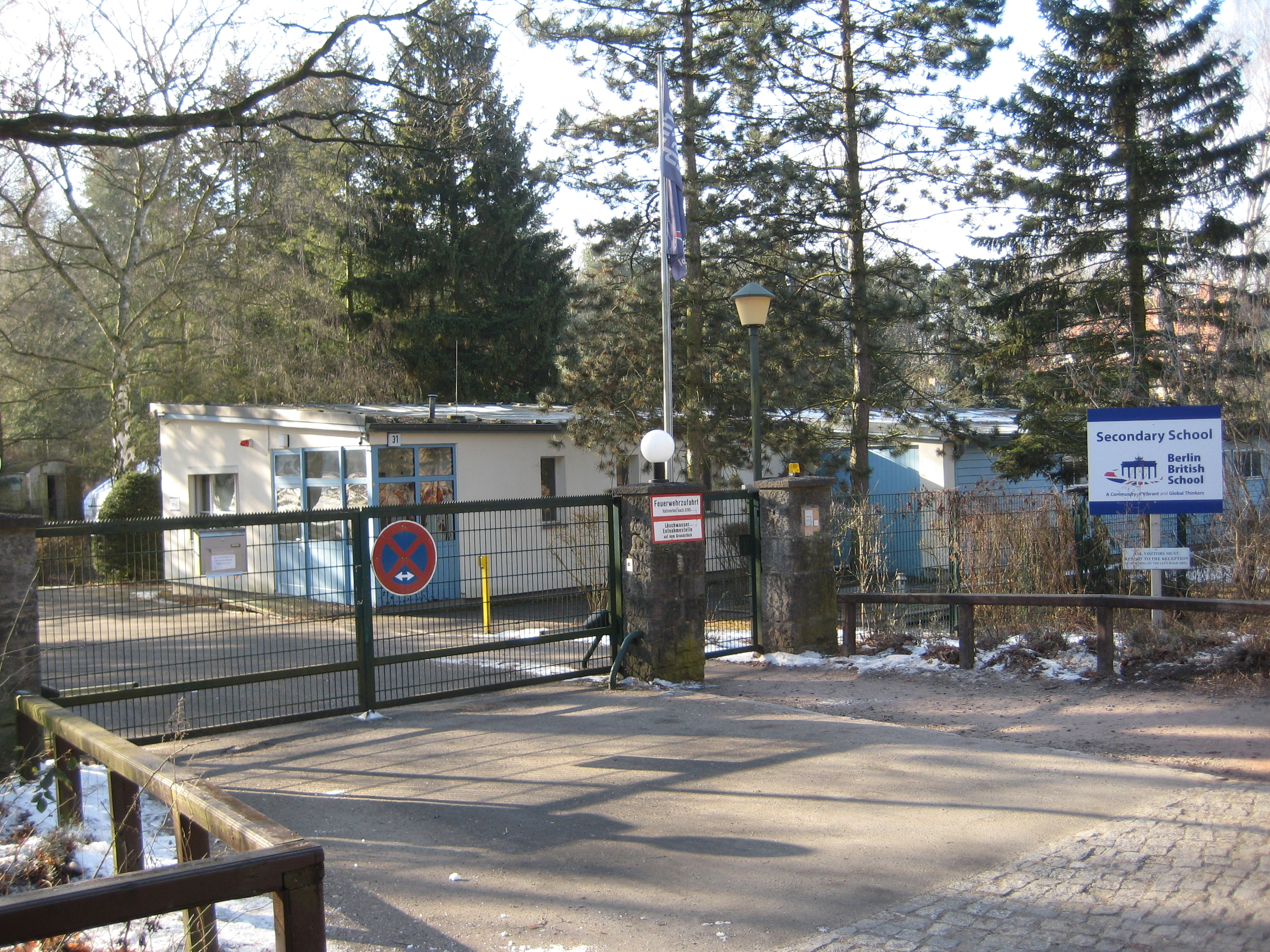
- Berlin British Secondary School

Location
- Dickensweg 17–19; Berlin, 14055; Germany
- Coordinates: 52°30′31″N 13°14′13″E

Information
- Type: Private, Non-Profit, International school
- Motto: A Community of Vibrant and Global Thinkers
- Founded: 1994
- Head of school: Mr. Dominic Coutts (Secondary); Ms. Caitriona Phelan-Körnig (Early Years and Primary)
- Gender: Mixed
- Age range: 3–18
- Education system: International
- Colours: Blue, white and red
- Mascot: Bumblebees
- Accreditation: Council of International Schools IBO, CIE, COBIS
- Website: www.berlinbritishschool.de

Berlin British School BBS is a private, international English-medium school for children aged 3 to 18, located in Charlottenburg, an affluent locality of Berlin, Germany.

== History ==
BBS occupies the premises of Charlottenburg First School, a BFES (predecessor of the present-day SCE) school for children of British Forces Germany personnel which closed after the fall of the Berlin Wall and the withdrawal of British troops from Berlin. Through the efforts of some Diplomatic Service staff at the British Embassy in Berlin, the school was opened in September 1994 to its first pupils. It is the first British international (non-SCE) school established in Germany.

== Curriculum ==
Early Years

Early Years is the youngest part of the Berlin British School.

The curriculum is based on a blend of the Foundation Stage Curriculum of England and Wales, the IB Primary Years Programme and the Berliner Bildungsprogramm. Every group is supported by an English-speaking teacher or teaching assistant and a native German-speaking Erzieher/in. This combination provides the best of all systems enabling us to provide a British-based bilingual education. From Nursery onwards, the classrooms are equipped with interactive smart boards, which staff use to support the children in their learning.

The Havelchaussee site houses the K1 (age 3–4) and K2 groups (age 4–5). The building is in the heart of the Grunewald. Attached to the building is a spacious outdoor play area. There is a library and an inquiry room for the children.

The K3 group (age 5–6), is situated at the

Primary School

The Primary School is a five-minute walk from Berlin's historic Olympic stadium in the suburbs of Charlottenburg. The single story building, which houses K3 group and Grades 1 to 5, has open, airy and bright learning spaces, as well as a library, gym, music room, and computer lab. There is a large and well equipped playground.

The curriculum has been developed throughout the school and as a result, at all year groups in Primary school, students follow the International Baccalaureate Organisation's Primary Years Programme (PYP). The programme includes elements of the English National Curriculum and the local curriculum within this framework where appropriate.

At Primary School, two separate programmes are offered:

1. 'genehmigte bilinguale Ersatzschule' (state-recognised bilingual private school): Bilingual English-German programme based on a blend of the local Berlin curriculum framework (Berliner Rahmenlehrplan) merged with the IB Primary Years Programme (IBPYP); Mathematics and P.E. are taught in German as well as the mandatory German lessons (approx. 50% of the lessons).
2. 'internationale Ergänzungsschule' (private international school): Monolingual English-only programme based upon the framework of the International Baccalaureate (IBPYP) and is taught through the medium of English, except for the mandatory German lessons.

Secondary School

Beginning with Grade 6 at Secondary school, BBS is working with a programme that focuses on inquiry-based learning and incorporates recent pedagogical ideas on educating students for a challenging future.

In Grades 9 and 10 (Key Stage 4), a two-year course is followed, leading to the qualification of International General Certificate of Secondary Education (IGCSE), a programme designed to suit the needs of an international student body Students who are successful at IGCSE then move into Grades 11 and 12, where they prepare for the IB Diploma programme.

At Secondary School, two separate programmes:

1. 'genehmigte bilinguale Ersatzschule' (state-recognised bilingual private school): Bilingual English-German programme based on a blend of the local Berlin curriculum framework (Berliner Rahmenlehrplan) blended with an international curriculum that incorporates an inquiry based pedagogy and more traditional approaches; Ethics, History, WAT (lit. Economics-Work-Technology) and partly P.E. as well as Mathematics lessons take place in German (approx. 50% of lessons); all remaining lessons are taught through the medium of English.
2. 'internationale Ergänzungsschule' (private international school): Monolingual English-only programme based upon the framework of the International Baccalaureate (IB) and taught through the medium of English, except for the mandatory German lessons.

International Baccalaurate Diploma Programme

Each IB Diploma student chooses six academic subjects (3 at Standard and 3 at higher Level). In addition, a student must follow a 'Theory of Knowledge' course and the CAS (Creativity, Action, Service) programme. All IB students must also write an Extended Essay of 4000 words on a subject of their choice.

There are special provisions for pupils whose first language is not English and also SEN and Gifted & Talented. German is taught at all levels and is a mandatory subject regardless of level of proficiency or citizenship.

== Additional Offers ==
Clubs/ activities

The school offers a large variety of clubs during lunch break or after school hours, such as music lessons and sports courses. Day trips or weekly trips are also organised for the students.

After-school care

After-school care is offered from 15:00 until 17:00.

Uniforms & house system

Following the British model, the students wear a school uniform during lessons and P.E.

The house system is organised according to the British model. Teachers and students are assigned to one of the four houses. This system is intended to strengthen team spirit across all ages.

Other

The Parent Teacher Association (PTA) organises fundraising events to support the school in purchasing playground equipment, school kitchen equipment or musical instruments.

BBS regularly participates in the German International Schools Sports Tournaments (GISST), a sports competition between international schools throughout Germany.

Charitable activities: the students themselves and a charitable group within the school collect donations on non-uniform days and at other events. At Christmas time, for example, Christmas trees are set up with the wishes of children in need attached to the branches. These can then be fulfilled with a donation.

Membership

- University of Cambridge International Examinations (CIE)
- European Council of International Schools (ECIS)
- Council of International Schools (CIS)
- International Baccalaureate Organisation (IBO)
- Association of German International Schools (AGIS)

== See also ==
German schools in the United Kingdom:

- German School London
