= Princess Muna Al Hussein =

Jordanian princess (born 1941)

Muna Al Hussein
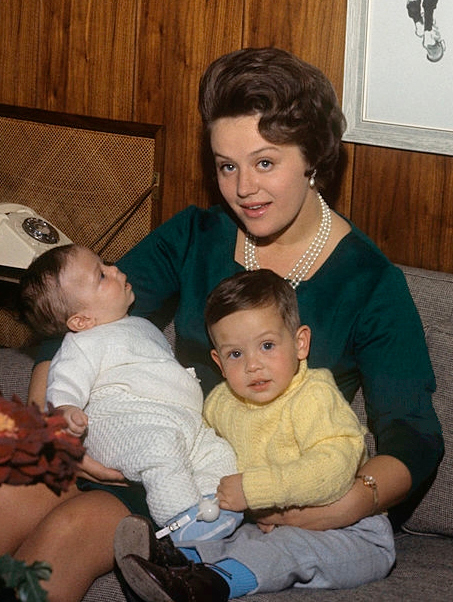
- Muna in 1964 with her sons, Abdullah II and Faisal

Princess consort of Jordan
- Tenure: 25 May 1961 – 21 December 1972
- Born: Toni Avril Gardiner; 25 April 1941 (age 85); Chelmondiston, Suffolk, England
- Spouse: Hussein of Jordan (m. 1961; div. 1972)
- Issue: Abdullah II of Jordan; Prince Faisal; Princess Aisha; Princess Zein
- Father: Walter Percy Gardiner
- Mother: Doris Elizabeth Sutton

Princess Muna Al Hussein (Arabic: منى الحسين; born Toni Avril Gardiner, 25 April 1941) is the mother of Abdullah II of Jordan. She was the second wife of King Hussein; the couple divorced on 21 December 1972. She is British by birth.

== Early life ==
Toni Avril Gardiner was born in Chelmondiston, Suffolk, England, the daughter of Doris Elizabeth (née Sutton) and Lieutenant Colonel Walter Percy "Tony" Gardiner. She attended Bourne School in Kuala Lumpur, Malaya, which was administered by the British Families Education Service for the children of British service personnel stationed overseas, where she was an A-grade field hockey player.

Gardiner's father was a British Army officer who finished his career with the rank of Lieutenant Colonel. He was the son of Arthur Gardiner, a gamekeeper. He joined the Royal Engineers at the age of 17, and was stationed in Mandatory Palestine for 18 months in the 1930s. He later served in France, North Africa, and Italy during World War II.

== Marriage and children ==
Gardiner met the King of Jordan, Hussein, while working as a secretarial assistant on the film set of Lawrence of Arabia. The King had allowed his troops to work as extras on this film and would occasionally visit to monitor the production's progress. However, there is another report, stating that Gardiner and the King met when her father began to work as a military adviser in Jordan.

Gardiner married King Hussein in Amman, Jordan, on 25 May 1961, changing her name to Muna Al Hussein upon marriage. It is believed she was not proclaimed queen because the government disapproved of the marriage due to her foreign origin. Together they had four children:

- Abdullah (born 1962; now King Abdullah II of Jordan)
- Faisal (born 1963)
- Aisha and Zein (twins, born 1968)

They were divorced on 21 December 1972. She retained the custody of their four children and was given Humar Palace, at Al-Hummar, 15 miles west of Amman. She continues to work and live in Jordan.

== Causes and activities ==
She is involved in the development of nursing in Jordan, founding the Princess Muna Scholarship Fund for Nursing. In 1962, she founded the Princess Muna College of Nursing, now the Princess Muna College of Nursing and Allied Health Professions.

She is the WHO Patron for Nursing and Midwifery in the Eastern Mediterranean Region, former Commissioner to the UN High-Level Commission on Health Employment and Economic Growth and Champion for the Nursing Now Campaign. In a speech at the opening of the 73rd World Health Assembly 2020, she recognised the contribution of healthcare workers for their courage and relentless fight against COVID-19 and said that "applause without action is no longer acceptable".

== Honours ==
=== National ===
- Jordan:
  - Grand Cordon with Collar of the Order of al-Hussein bin Ali
  - Grand Cordon with Brilliants of the Supreme Order of the Renaissance

=== Foreign ===
- (Kingdom of Greece) Greek Royal Family: Dame Grand Cross of the Royal Order of Beneficence
- (Iran) Iranian Imperial Family: Recipient of the Commemorative Medal of the 2,500 year Celebration of the Persian Empire
- Malaysia: Honorary Grand Commander of the Order of the Defender of the Realm
- (Kingdom of Romania) Romanian Royal Family:
  - Grand Cross of the Royal Order of the Crown
  - Member, Special Class of the Royal Decoration of the Custodian of the Crown of Romania
- Sweden: Member Grand Cross of the Order of the Polar Star
- Tunisia: Grand Cross of the Order of the Republic

Royal titles
Preceded by Dina bint Abdul-Hamid as queen consort	Princess consort of Jordan; 25 May 1961 – 21 December 1972	Succeeded by Alia Al-Hussein as queen consort
