= Kent School (disambiguation) =

Kent School is a school in Kent county, Connecticut, US.

Kent School may also refer to:

- Kent School, Hostert, a former British military boarding school in Germany
- Kent School for Girls, now Kent Denver School, Denver, Colorado

== See also ==
- University of Kent, including the Kent School of Architecture and Planning
