= Windsor School, Germany =

Windsor School
- Rheindahlen, North Rhine-Westphalia, BFPO 40; Germany

Information
- Type: SCE school
- Established: 1986
- Closed: 2013
- Local authority: SCE
- Department for Education URN: 132402 Tables
- Ofsted: Reports
- Head teacher: Brian Davies
- Gender: Coeducational
- Age: 11 to 18
- Enrolment: 450~
- Website: https://web.archive.org/*/http://www.school-portal.co.uk/Grouphomepage.asp?GroupId=724003

Windsor School was a secondary school in Germany for the children of British military personnel. It was located within the military complex at JHQ Rheindahlen, near Mönchengladbach. The school operated from 1986 to 2013. It was one of several secondary schools in Germany operated by the Service Children's Education organization.

== History ==
Windsor School opened in 1987 with the merging of two long established Service Children's Schools; Queen's School, JHQ and Kent School which was in Hostert near Schwalmtal, North Rhine-Westphalia.

Queen's School Rheindahlen opened in 1955 to provide day secondary school facilities for the children living in the new NATO Headquarters and adjacent British Garrisons and RAF Stations in the lower Rhineland. The founding headteacher was Mr George Wright. The rapid expansion of JHQ soon created a demand that was 50% in excess of Queens’ capacity. To manage the shortfall admission was restricted to the children of families living within the JHQ complex. Children posted in and from families outside JHQ were forced to board. It was clear that greater provision was required. In 1963 the school was at its largest with 1100 pupils aged 11–18 years.

When the three air bases were built at RAF Bruggen, RAF Wildenrath and RAF Laarbruch, there was a need for another secondary school in the area to accommodate the extra numbers. At the same time pupils from SHAPE and a variety of ISODETS required boarding provision. The site chosen was an old Franciscan Monastery at Hostert, just north west of Hardt village. The site had been converted into an emergency military hospital in the early 1960s for use in the event of war. The building was again converted, this time into a school and became Kent School in 1963 with boarders based at Chatham House and Deal House on JHQ, along with boarding at Medway House, close by Kent School. Medway catered for weekly boarders with the other two housing the termly boarders

Windsor School took its name from SCE Windsor School in Hamm, that had operated from the early 1950s until 1983, initially as separate schools for boys and girls.

Windsor School inherited the grounds and building of the former Queen's School with some building improvements such as an expansion of its West wing. In 1991 West Block was completed, adding two floors of classrooms and a Sixth Form Centre. It also became the highest part of the school. As a result of this build Kent School site at Hostert closed and was handed back to the German authorities in 1993. The new building was opened by the Duchess of Gloucester, Colonel-in-Chief RAMC on 25 March 1992.

At its height Windsor School had over 1000 pupils. Following the disbandment of the British Army of the Rhine in 1995 and the subsequent drop in military personnel and accompanying families, the average fell to around 600.

Windsor School was located on Snyders Road in JHQ. Pupils ranged from 11 to 19 years old, with some being day pupils from the surrounding JHQ garrison, some bussed in from nearby military bases and a number of weekly and termly boarders, who were accommodated in its two boarding houses, Windsor House and School House. The school operated in the same way as any secondary school in England, Wales or Northern Ireland, following the National Curriculum and inspected by Ofsted. The final Ofsted Inspection in 2010 judged the school to be outstanding.

Windsor School had a Sixth Form, offering courses towards A Level and BTEC qualifications. Sixth Form extra-curricular activities included an annual RAG (Raising And Giving) Week, in which they hosted events to raise money for charities.

Windsor School closed in summer 2013. School House closed its doors to boarders in July 2012, with all boarders catered for by Windsor House in the final year. During the final years the school was awarded Gold Artsmark, International Schools Award, Healthy Schools Award, Eco Schools Award and became an Enquiry School in Creative Partnerships. The final school year started with 148 pupils.

== Head teachers ==
- 1987 - 1996 Mr Tim Kilbride (transferred from headteacher role at Kent School)
- 1996 - 1997 Mr Gareth Jones (Acting)
- 1997 – 2005 Mrs Anne Farrell
- 2005 Mrs Karen Clark (Acting)
- 2005 - 2013 Mr Brian Davies

== See also ==
- Gloucester School
- Kent School, Hostert
