= Hostert =

Hostert may refer to:

- Hostert, Niederanven, a small town in Niederanven, Luxembourg
- Hostert, Rambrouch, a small town in Rambrouch, Luxembourg
- Hostert (Schwalmtal), a residential area in Schwalmtal, North Rhine-Westphalia, Germany
- Jasmina Hostert (born 1982), Bosnian-German politician
