= Educational and Training Services Branch =

Education arm of the British Army

Educational & Training Services
- Cap badge of the ETS
- Active: 1845 as the Corps of Army Schoolmasters
- Country: (United Kingdom) Great Britain
- Branch: British Army
- Type: Combat Service Support
- Role: Education and Training
- Size: c.300 Regular Officers c.200 Reservist Officers
- HQ: Education Branch, Army HQ, Andover, Hampshire
- Mottos: 'Animo Et Fide' Courage and Faith
- Colors: Oxford & Minerva Blue
- March: Quick March: Gaudeamus Igitur ("Let us rejoice") Slow March: Greensleeves
- Mascot: Minerva
- Anniversaries: Education Sunday, the First Sunday in June.

Insignia
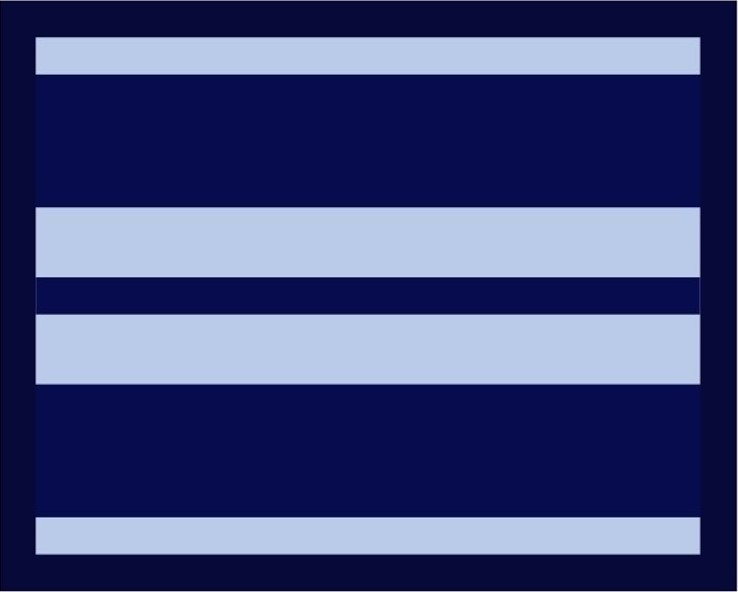
- Tactical Recognition Flash

The Educational and Training Services Branch forms part of the Adjutant General's Corps and have done since 1992 when this Corps of the British Army was formed. Their remit is to continue the general education of soldiers and officers alike, as well as the military training of the soldiers of the Army.

== History ==
The Educational and Training Services Branch can trace its history back to 1762 when the First Regiment of Guards (Grenadiers) based at the Tower of London established a Unit School. In 1797 the Royal Artillery opened a Regimental School at Woolwich Station, and in 1812 the British Parliament first provided funding for Army schools. This was the first widespread, state funded education system in the United Kingdom.

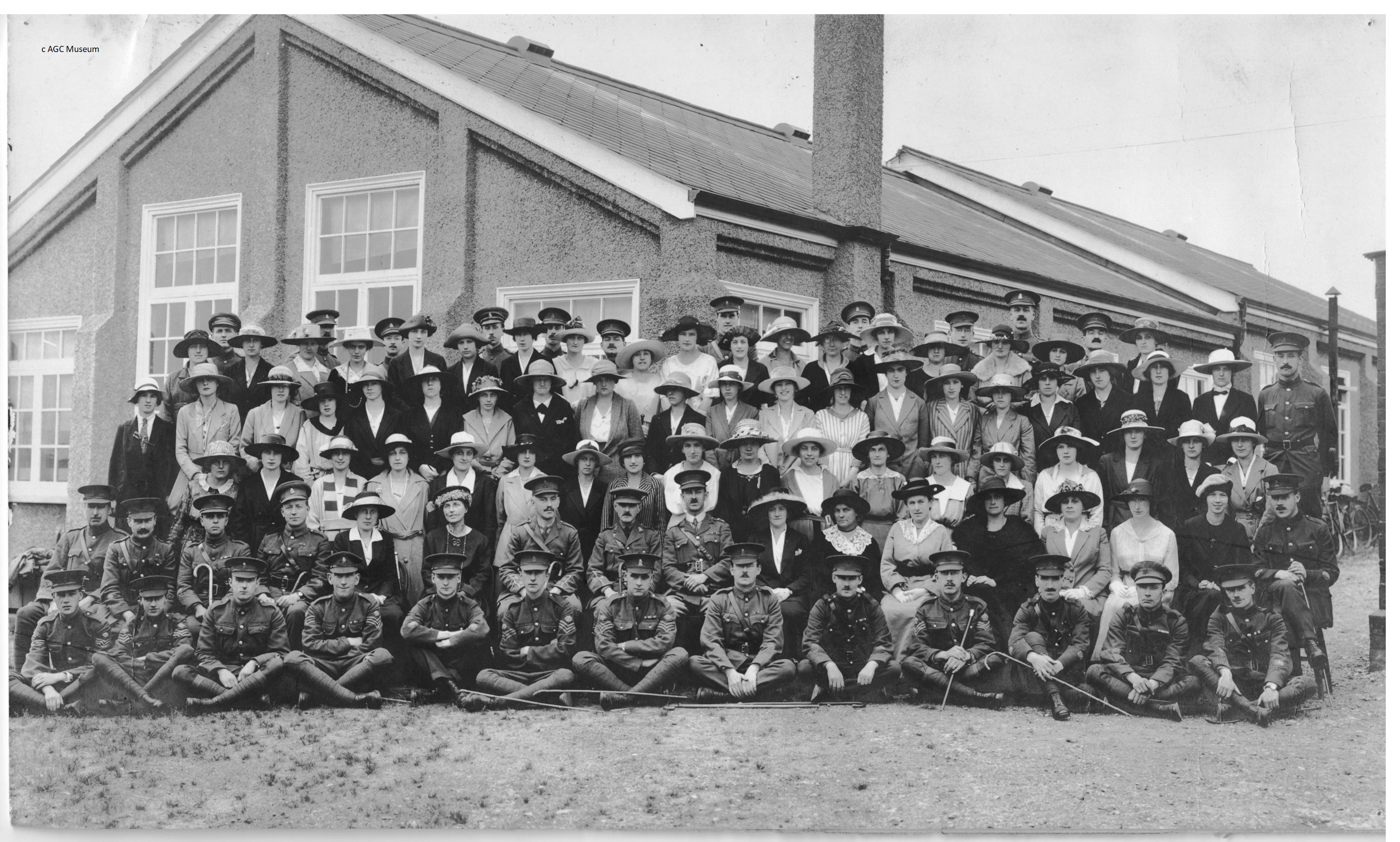
The Corps of Army Schoolmasters and the Queen's Army Schoolmistresses in Aldershot, 1919.

Following the establishment of the Regimental School System, all Army Sergeant Schoolmasters were formally trained in The Monitorial System this being the most modern form of instruction at the time. Thus, the Corps of Army Schoolmasters was established in 1845 to provide Education for Soldiers and their families. References exist to Army Schools, now Army Education Centres, being in operation continually since 1898.

In 1992 the Royal Army Educational Corps was disbanded and its Officers transferred into the newly formed Educational and Training Services Branch of the Adjutant General's Corps.

== Traditions ==
Members of the ETS Branch are entitled to wear blue socks with their Number 2 Service Dress (British Army) uniforms. This is a unique part of their uniform, as a variation of socks is not seen in other units which wear infantry pattern service dress. This stems from a Royal Warrant of 1854 which instructed Army Schoolmasters to wear: "a blue frock-coat, heavily braided in black, and worn with gold shoulder-knots, a sword and a crimson silk sash, and a cap with scarlet band, bearing a crown in gold thread".

== Organisation ==
ETS is an all officer, all graduate, branch. It provides education to Regular and Reserve Army personnel, helping them to meet the challenges of the 21st century by training for certainty and educating for uncertainty. Officers are primarily employed as follows:

- Learning and Development Advisors (LDAs - usually in the rank of Major) who specialise in the analysis, design, delivery and assurance of Defence wide training and educational courses.
- Training Development Advisors (TDAs - usually in the rank of Captain) in the Army's Capability Directorates, Army Recruiting and Initial Training Command.
- Specialist Language Training Managers within the Defence Centre for Languages and Culture in either Foreign or English Language training. For example, Officer in Command of the Pre-RMAS course for Officer Cadets from foreign militaries attending courses at Royal Military Academy Sandhurst.

=== Army Education Centres ===
The original authority for the establishment of Army Education Centres was granted in 1947 for "up to eighty education centres, wherever a concentration of 1500 men or more had displayed a need". Currently, the below are in operation:

Army Education Centres Past to Present
| AEC Number (1991) | Location | Current AEC Number (2021) |
| 2 AEC | York | 3 AEC Gp |
| 3 AEC | Catterick | 3 AEC Gp |
| 6 AEC | Warminster | 12 AEC Gp |
| 7 AEC | Chepstow | 20 AEC Gp |
| 10 AEC | Tidworth | 10 AEC Gp |
| 12 AEC | Larkhill | 12 AEC Gp |
| 15 AEC | Bicester | 77 AEC Gp |
| 18 AEC | Colchester | 18 AEC Gp |
| 22 AEC | Chatham | 30 AEC Gp |
| 24 AEC | Windsor | 30 AEC Gp |
| 27 AEC | Edinburgh | 27 AEC Gp |
| 31 AEC | Woolwich | 30 AEC Gp |
| 32 AEC | Lisburn | 32 AEC Gp |
| 55 AEC | Dhekalia | 55 AEC Gp |
| 77 AEC | Aldershot | 77 AEC Gp |
| 78 AEC | Tidworth | 10 AEC Gp |

=== Career pathway ===
An ETS Officer would usually start their career in one of two roles: Learning Development Officer (LDO) in an Army Education Centre, or an instructor at the Army Foundation College Harrogate (AFC(H)). Later roles include: Army Training Regiment (ATR) LDOs or Platoon Commanders, Army School of Education (ASE) Instructor, or assignments in the wider Army.

== Affiliation ==
The Educational and Training Services Branch is a member of the International Association for Military Pedagogy (IAMP).

=== Affiliated corps ===
- Australia - Royal Australian Army Educational Corps
- New Zealand - Royal New Zealand Educational Corps

== Notable alumni ==
- Quentin Blake (cartoonist) during National Service served in the Royal Army Education Corps.
  - "I joined the educational corps and taught enlisted boys at Aldershot": "I tried to teach them English, which in most cases meant punctuation and spelling. In some ways it was like Dotheboys Hall, and they used to run away. Towards the end of my two years, I illustrated what I suppose was my first book, a pamphlet called English on Parade."
- Archie Cecil Thomas White VC after serving as a captain in the Alexandra, Princess of Wales's Own (Yorkshire Regiment) transferred to the Army Education Corps and reached the rank of Colonel to serve as Command Education Officer Home Forces from November 1940 to August 1943.
- Ronald Barnes, 3rd Baron Gorell founder of the Royal Army Education Corps on 15 June 1920.
- Leonard Rossiter served as a Sergeant in the Army Education Corps during the Second World War.
- Brigadier Edward Keith Bryne Furze was a Military Knight of Windsor from 1955 to 1971, he is buried in St George's Chapel, Windsor Castle.

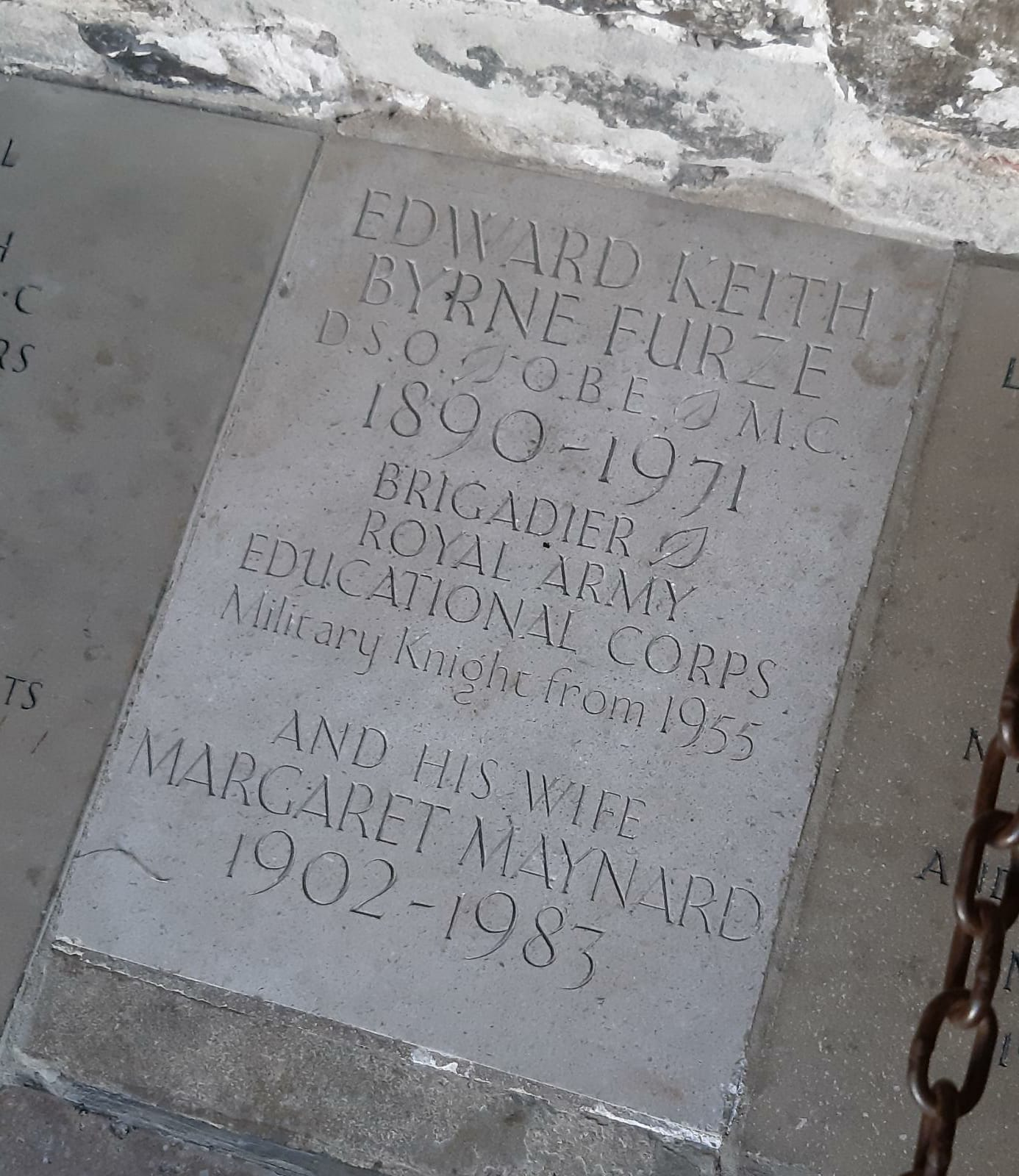
Grave of Brigadier Furze at Windsor Castle

- Richard Foord elected as the Member of Parliament (MP) for Tiverton and Honiton in 2022.
