= Mountbatten Primary School (Celle) =

- Celle, Lower Saxony, BFPO 23; Germany

Information
- Type: SCE school
- Established: 1947; 1985 (merger)
- Closed: 2012
- Department for Education URN: 132393 Tables
- Ofsted: Reports
- Chair of Governors: Lt Col R Wooddisse
- Head teacher: Miss Annwen Parry
- Gender: Coeducational
- Age: 3 to 11
- Enrolment: 160~
- Colour: Red
- Website: http://www.mountbatten.sceschools.com

Mountbatten Primary School was a primary school in Celle, Germany operated by the Service Children's Education for children of British military personnel based there.

== History ==
Celle School was founded in September 1947 to cater to children aged 3 to 14 of personnel and staff from RAF Celle and nearby stations. A second school, Grenville School, opened in 1954 and Celle School changed its name to Collingwood School, named so in honour of Admiral Collingwood. Pupil numbers begin to decline after RAF Celle was closed in 1957 and the station returned to the German government. Collingwood and Grenville merged to form a single school in 1985 and renamed Mountbatten Primary School. The school was opened to a small number of English-speaking expatriate children, mostly from the Commonwealth and EU countries.

The school closed in summer 2012 as part of the British Army's closure of Celle Station under the Strategic Defence and Security Review by the MOD, which envisages the British Army withdrawing from Germany by 2020.

== Curriculum ==
In its last years, Mountbatten Primary followed the National Curriculum and is inspected by Ofsted.

It was one of several feeder primary schools to Gloucester School in Hohne about half an hour away.
