= Bourne School =

Defunct secondary school in Malaysia

Location
- Kuala Lumpur

Information
- Type: Secondary school

Bourne School was a secondary school established in May 1954 in Rifle Range Road, Kuala Lumpur, Malaya (present day Peninsular Malaysia); it closed in July 1965. The school was administered by the British Families Education Service, which provided for the education of the children of British armed forces personnel stationed overseas. Its official name was 'BAC Bourne School' (British Army Children's School).

The school was named after Lt. General Sir Geoffrey Bourne. Teachers would generally be drawn from the United Kingdom and work at the school for a two-year period, although many remained for longer periods.

== History of Bourne School ==
At the height of the Malayan Emergency in May 1954, Lt. General Sir Geoffrey Bourne, the military commander of the British Forces, officially opened a group of temporary hutments for the education of servicemen's children. From that day the school grew in size and prestige until the name of Bourne became an accepted part of the educational pattern in Malaya and the Federal capital

In September 1957 the first boarding houses were opened to accommodate the children of service families stationed elsewhere in Malaya. In the same year Headquarters Malaya Command was moved to Seremban and, as the families gradually followed, the need for boarding accommodation increased. Girls and junior boys were boarded in Arakan House near the School and Istana Hostel, a former palace of the Sultan of Selangor, was taken over for the senior boys.

Travel to and from the school for "Boarders" was by local transport Trains and Ferries from all parts of the Malay peninsula, for example lists were made showing students detraining at the Penang Ferry Rail Station Pupils returning from Bourne School at the end of term

With the ending of the emergency and the run-down of British Military personnel in Malaya, the school opened its doors to fee-paying children of the many nationalities resident in Kuala Lumpur. Altogether children of 22 different countries received an English style education at Bourne.

Some 5000 children between the ages of 11 and 18 passed through Bourne during its ten years of life. Many took and passed the London General Certificate of Education and other external examinations.

The school always took an active part in the sporting activities of the country. Although its small numbers prevented it winning many inter-school games. In 1964 Ivan Myall and Marion Jolley and Sheila Waterman swam for Malaya and were selected for the Malaysian Swimming Team. Lorraine Howell played in the Malaysian Ladies Hockey Team. Ivan Myall also had the distinction of winning the Malaya Junior Open Chess Championships. Throughout the years many Bourne schoolchildren have represented Selangor in inter-state swimming championships.

== Notable alumni ==
- Princess Muna al-Hussein
