= Princess Alia bint Hussein =

Jordanian royal

- Born: 13 February 1956 (age 70); Amman, Jordan
- Spouse: Nasser Wasfi Mirza (m. 1977; div. 1988) Sayyid Mohammed Al-Saleh (m. 1988)
- Issue: Hussein Mirza; Talal Al-Saleh; Abdul Hamid Al-Saleh
Names
- Alia bint Hussein bin Talal bin Abdullah
- House: Hashemite
- Father: Hussein of Jordan
- Mother: Dina bint Abdul-Hamid

Princess Alia bint Al Hussein (born 13 February 1956) is the eldest child of King Hussein of Jordan. Her mother is his first wife, Sharifa Dina bint Abdul-Hamid. She is the older half-sister of Abdullah II of Jordan.

== Education ==
Princess Alia received her primary education in Amman, attending Ahliyyah School for Girls and Rosary College, Amman. She then attended Sibton Park School in Lyminge, England, until 1968, after spending one year at Benenden School in Kent (1969–70), and obtaining her A-Levels in Arabic, English, and French from Millfield School in Somerset, England, in 1972. Princess Alia graduated with honours from the University of Jordan in 1977, obtaining a bachelor's degree in English literature.

== Marriage ==
Princess Alia married Lieutenant-Colonel Nasser Wasfi Mirza (born 1945) on 12 April 1977 in the Raghadan Palace, and has one son from the marriage:

- Hussein Mirza (born 12 February 1981)

Alia and Nasser divorced in 1988. She married Sayyid Mohammed Al-Saleh (elder son of Sayyid Farid Al-Saleh) in Amman on 30 July 1988. They have two children:

- Talal Al-Saleh (born 12 September 1989)
- Abdul Hamid Al-Saleh (born 15 November 1992)

Princess Alia and her half-sister Zein are also sisters-in-law, with Zein married to Mohammed Al-Saleh's brother.

== Life and activities ==
Princess Alia worked as registrar and artist with the British School of Archaeology under Crystal Benett OBE, and has been a member of Fakherelnissa' Zeid's Art Group since the 1980s. In her capacity as director of the Royal Stables of Jordan for the Preservation of the Arabian Horses, Princess Alia initiated the festival of the "Arabian Horse at Home" in 1988 (now a yearly event) and organised the Middle East Championships for Purebred Horses, Jordan. She has also founded the Princess Alia Foundation, a non-profit, non-governmental organisation that is under the Ministry of Social Development in the Hashemite Kingdom of Jordan. Its stated motto is "Respect and Compassion towards Creation". In that capacity, in 2011, she delivered the keynote address at the World Arabian Horse Organization (WAHO) conference titled "The Relationship Between Horses and Humans in Today's World," drawing clear parallels between animal welfare and human rights.

Princess Alia has held a 2 Dan Black Belt Taekwondo since 1987, and enjoys equestrianism, horse breeding, judging of Arabian horses, collecting stamps, reading and sports in general. Equestrianism is a family passion; her half-sister, Princess Haya bint Hussein, is the former president of the International Federation for Equestrian Sports (FEI) and a member of the International Olympic Committee (IOC).

== Patronages ==
- Registrar and Artist of the British School of Archaeology.
- Director of the Royal Jordanian State Stud since 1973.
- Hononorary President of the University of Jordan Alumni Club (UJAC).
- Hononorary President of the Royal Jordanian Equestrian Federation since 1993.
- Hononorary President of the Jordan Meningitis Foundation (JMF) since 1995.
- Hononorary President of the Jordanian Philatelic Society.
- Hononorary President of the Circassian Ladies's Welfare Society.
- Hononorary President of the Society for the Development and Welfare of Rural Women.
- Patron of the Brooke Hospital for Animals Princess Alia Clinic at Wadi Musa.
- Honorary Governor of the Arab Horse Society (United Kingdom).
- Director of the Royal Stables for the Preservation of the Arabian Horse since 1980.

== Notable published works ==
- The Arabian Horse of Egypt (ISBN 9774163486), co-authored by Sharifa Sarra Ghazi.
- Royal Heritage: The Story of Jordan's Arab Horses (ISBN 0956417043), co-authored by Peter Upton.
- Small Miracles: The Story of the Princess Alia Foundation (ISBN 0956417086), co-authored by Cynthia Culbertson.

== Honours ==
=== National honours ===
- Grand Cordon of the Supreme Order of the Renaissance
- Grand Cordon of the Order of the Star of Jordan
- First Class of Al-Hussein Decoration for Distinguished Contribution (5 February 2007)

=== Foreign honours ===
- Japan: Grand Cordon (Paulownia) of the Order of the Precious Crown (10 March 1976)
- Norway: Grand Cross of the Royal Norwegian Order of Merit (4 April 2000)
- Spain: Grand Cross of the Order of Isabella the Catholic (18 March 1977)
