= Edward Banayoti =

Canadian businessman

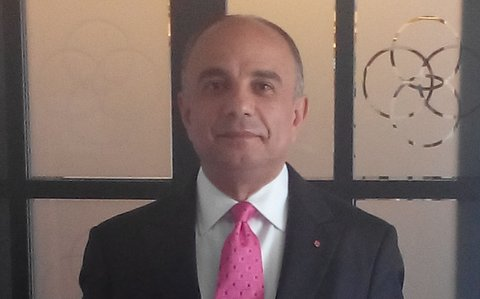
- Born: Egypt
- Other names: Ernest Anderson; Ernie Anderson; Ashraf Banayoti
- Education: University of Toronto; York University
- Occupation: Founder of Defence Unlimited International
- Spouse: Princess Aisha bint Hussein (m. 2016; div. 2016)

Edward Sawiris Banayoti, formerly known as Ernest (Ernie) Anderson and Ashraf Banayoti, is a businessman of Egyptian origin based in Canada.

He was the subject of a financial investigation for suspicion of fake mortgage deals through his unlicensed Canadian investment company Golden Gate Funds LP, and entered into a settlement with the Ontario Securities Commission in 2009, agreeing to pay $4.7-million in financial penalties.

He has variously been reported, and has said to be, active in financial investments, real-estate, commercial aviation, arms dealing and lobbying. His attempt to purchase a substantial stake in Air Malta attracted attention in Malta and from security regulators in Canada.

== Career ==
At the end of 2003, Ernest Anderson registered Golden Gate Funds LP. According to the Ontario Securities Commission (OSC), they opened an investigation in 2005 into Golden Gate Funds which was an unlicensed firm marketing its products to the public.

More than 150 investors collectively invested over $8-million into this fund managed by Banayoti (known as Ernest Anderson at the time), before the company went bankrupt. A case was heard before an OSC tribunal and a settlement was agreed in 2009 in which Banayoti acknowledged using investor funds not to invest in mortgages, as he told investors, but to cover operating costs and make payments to previous investors. As part of the settlement, the OSC demanded $4.7-million in monetary penalties. As of January 2012, the full amount of the penalties remained unpaid.

In 2015, Banayoti changed his name from Ernie Anderson to Edward Banayoti and founded the arms brokerage company Defence Unlimited. The company is registered as an organisation on the EU list of lobbies as of 2017 and is listed as supplying “Security, and Defence Supplies. Lobbying, and Political Consulting. EU military progress and licensing procedures."

Banayoti attracted media attention in Malta in 2016 when he made a bid for a 49.9% stake in Air Malta through his UK company Banayoti Holdings Limited. The company had been registered earlier in 2016 with a share capital of EUR 1.85 billion which was never paid up, according to the company accounts. Banayoti is reported to have met only once with the Maltese government, after which his offer was rejected with a government spokesperson claiming that a standard due diligence search on Banayoti and his companies "clearly showed, even at a preliminary stage, that his companies would not match government plans to identify a strategic partner which can assure a positive turnaround for Air Malta".

Banayoti Holdings Limited was dissolved in 2018.

== Personal life ==
In 2016, Banayoti married Princess Aisha Bint Al Hussein and divorced her six months later. When he converted to Islam, he took the Muslim first name Ashraf.

As Ernest Anderson, Banayoti was previously married.
