= Royal Air Force Educational Service =

Civilian-manned service within the Royal Air Force

The Royal Air Force Educational Service was a civilian-manned service within the British Royal Air Force which provided instruction for aircraft apprentices and airmen, mainly in engineering, but also in other subjects.

The service was established shortly after the formation of the Royal Air Force in 1918. Preference for recruitment as civilian education officers was given to men who had served as commissioned officers in the armed forces during the First World War until 1930, when it was extended to all ex-servicemen. From 1937, advertisements no longer stated that ex-servicemen would be given preference. From 1930, a degree was required.

On 1 October 1946, the Educational Service was disbanded and replaced by the commissioned officers of the new RAF Education Branch. Many education officers had already been commissioned during the Second World War.

== See also ==
- Naval Education Service
- Royal Army Educational Corps
