= Princess Aisha bint Hussein =

Jordanian royal

Princess Aisha bint Al Hussein
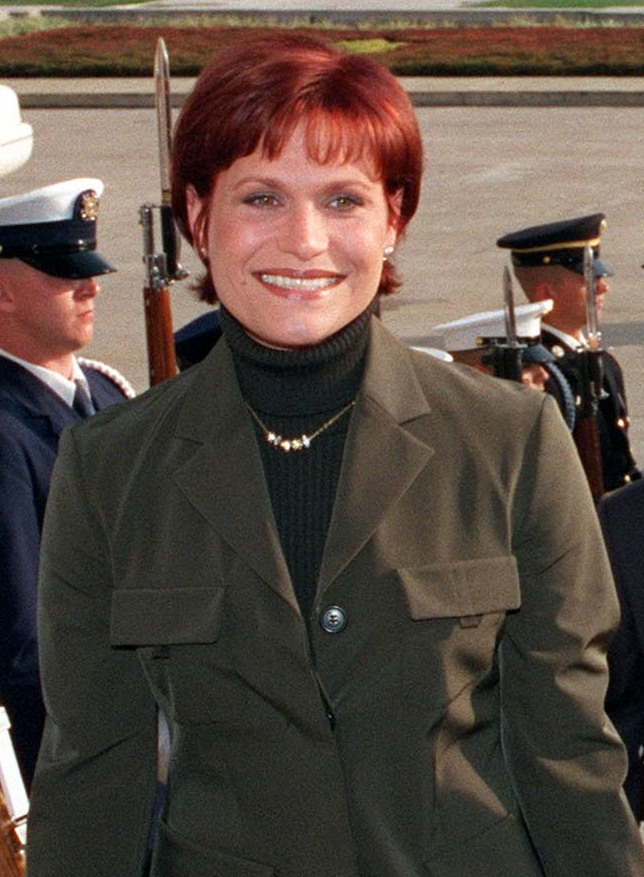
- Princess Aisha in 2001
- Born: 23 April 1968 (age 58); Amman, Jordan
- Spouse: Zeid Sa'adedine Juma (m. 1990; div. ?) Ashraf Banayoti (m. 2016; div. 2016)
- Issue: Aoun Juma; Muna Juma
Names
- Aisha bint Hussein bin Talal bin Abdullah
- House: Hashemite
- Father: Hussein of Jordan
- Mother: Toni Gardiner

Princess Aisha bint Al Hussein (Arabic: الأميرة عائشة بنت الحسين) (born 23 April 1968) is the sister of King Abdullah II of Jordan and is the twin sister of Princess Zein. Her parents are King Hussein and Princess Muna.

== Education ==
Aisha was born on 23 April 1968 at Palestine Hospital in Amman. She was educated up to age eight in Jordan, at the American community school (in the same class as her sister Zein, for all or almost all of the time). She moved to the U.S. to pursue her education for 10 years. She attended The Potomac School in McLean, Virginia, through the eighth grade. She graduated from Dana Hall School in Wellesley, Massachusetts, in 1986. She then attended the Royal Military Academy Sandhurst in the United Kingdom, completing the officer's training course in 1987. She then completed an undergraduate degree in Modern Middle East History and Politics from Pembroke College, Oxford. In June 2010 she completed her Master of Arts degree in Strategic Security Studies at the College of International Security Affairs (CISA), at the National Defense University, Washington, D.C., USA.

== Professional life ==
Hussein is a major general in the Jordanian military and became the first female in the Middle East to receive her parachutist wings after completing five military parachute jumps, according to her official biography.

She successfully completed her officers' training course at the Royal Military Academy, Sandhurst, in the United Kingdom in April 1987, following her arrival as the first Middle East woman to attend the academy. After graduation from Sandhurst, the princess served in Jordan's special forces and completed several additional parachuting courses.

Since 1996, she has taken part in several conferences by the Defense Department Advisory Committee on Women. She is a member of NATO's Mediterranean Dialogue and serves as a Jordanian expert in the internationally staffed NATO Human Factors and Medicine Research Task Group 140, on psychological, organizational and cultural aspects of terrorism, in all matters military and civilian.

She successfully completed numerous military courses, including Security and Protection with the Jordanian Royal Guards, Senior International Defense Management from the U.S. Naval Postgraduate School at the Defense Resources Management Institute in Monterey, California. She has also completed an open water diving course at the Scuba Schools International in New Jersey. She travels abroad frequently to further enhance her knowledge of military-related issues, particularly the role of women in the military.

She is currently assigned as the defense attaché with the Jordanian embassy to the United States.

== Private life ==
In 1990, Aisha married Zeid Sa'adedine Juma in Amman. The couple later divorced. She resides in the United States of America and has a son, Aoun Juma, born on 27 May 1992 and a daughter, Muna Juma, born on 18 July 1996. Aoun Juma is expected to study at the Royal Military Academy in Sandhurst.

On 27 January 2016, Princess Aisha married Ashraf Banayoti, previously called Edward Banayoti and before that called Ernest Anderson. Edward Banayoti took the Muslim name Ashraf Banayoti when he converted to Islam. Princess Aisha and Ashraf Banayoti divorced in Jordan in July 2016, according to the Royal Hashemite Court.

== Honours ==
=== National ===
- Jordan
  - Knight Grand Cordon of the Supreme Order of the Renaissance, Special Class
  - Knight Grand Cordon of the Order of the Star of Jordan
  - Knight Grand Cordon of the Order of Independence
  - Knight Grand Cordon of the Order of Military Merit

=== Foreign ===
- Brunei: Knight Grand Cross with Collar of the Order of Merit
- Italy: Knight Grand Cross of the Order of Merit of the Italian Republic
