= Naval Education Service =

Branch of the British Royal Navy

Branch overview
- Formed: 1903
- Preceding Branch: Department of Naval Education
- Dissolved: 1978
- Superseding Branch: Service Children's Education
- Jurisdiction: Government of the United Kingdom
- Headquarters: Admiralty Building; Whitehall; London
- Branch executive: Director of the Naval Education Service
- Parent Branch: Admiralty, Ministry of Defence

The Naval Education Service was a branch of the British Royal Navy which both provided education for naval personnel and ran schools for children of Royal Navy personnel.

== History ==
It was originally known as the Department of Naval Education of the Admiralty from 1914 until 1951 when it was renamed the Naval Education Service. It was under the control of the Office of the Second Sea Lord. It was abolished in 1978. Some of its functions have now been taken over by Service Children's Education.

The Director of Education (later Adviser on Naval Education) was a civilian employed within the Admiralty who was responsible for providing advice on non-professional education from 1903 until 1936, when naval officers took over responsibility.

== Director of Education ==
- Sir James Alfred Ewing, 1903−1917
- Cyril Ashford, 1917−1919 (acting director)

== Adviser on Naval Education ==
- Alexander McMullen, 1919−1936

== Directors of the Education Department of the Admiralty ==
- Instructor Captain Arthur Hall, 1936−1945
- Instructor Captain William Saxton, 1945−1948
- Instructor Captain William Bishop, 1948−1951

== Directors of the Naval Education Service and Heads of the Instructor Branch ==
Rear-Admiral Brinley Morgan

- Instructor Rear-Admiral Sir William Bishop, 1951−1956
- Instructor Rear-Admiral Sir John Fleming, 1956−1960
- Instructor Rear-Admiral Sir Charles Darlington, 1960−1965
- Instructor Rear-Admiral Albert Bellamy, 1965−1970
- Instructor Rear-Admiral Brinley Morgan, 1970−1975
- Rear-Admiral John Bell, 1975−1978

== Chief Naval Instructor Officers ==
Held in conjunction with another appointment.

- Rear-Admiral John Bell, 1978
- Rear-Admiral William Waddell, 1978−1981
- Rear-Admiral Trevor Spraggs, 1981−1983
- Rear-Admiral G. A. Baxter, 1983−1984
- Captain J. Marsh, 1984−?
- Rear-Admiral Jack Howard, 1987−1989

== See also ==
- Royal Air Force Educational Service
- Royal Army Educational Corps
