= Bergen-Hohne Garrison =

British garrison in Germany

Coordinates: 52.784°N 9.916°E

Location in Lower Saxony

Bergen-Hohne Garrison was a major British garrison in the post-Cold War period, with facilities located close to Bergen at Lager Hohne, at Lager Oerbke near Fallingbostel and at Celle in Lower Saxony, Germany. It was home to 7th Armoured Brigade and most of its subordinate units. It formed a major part of British Forces Germany.

== History ==
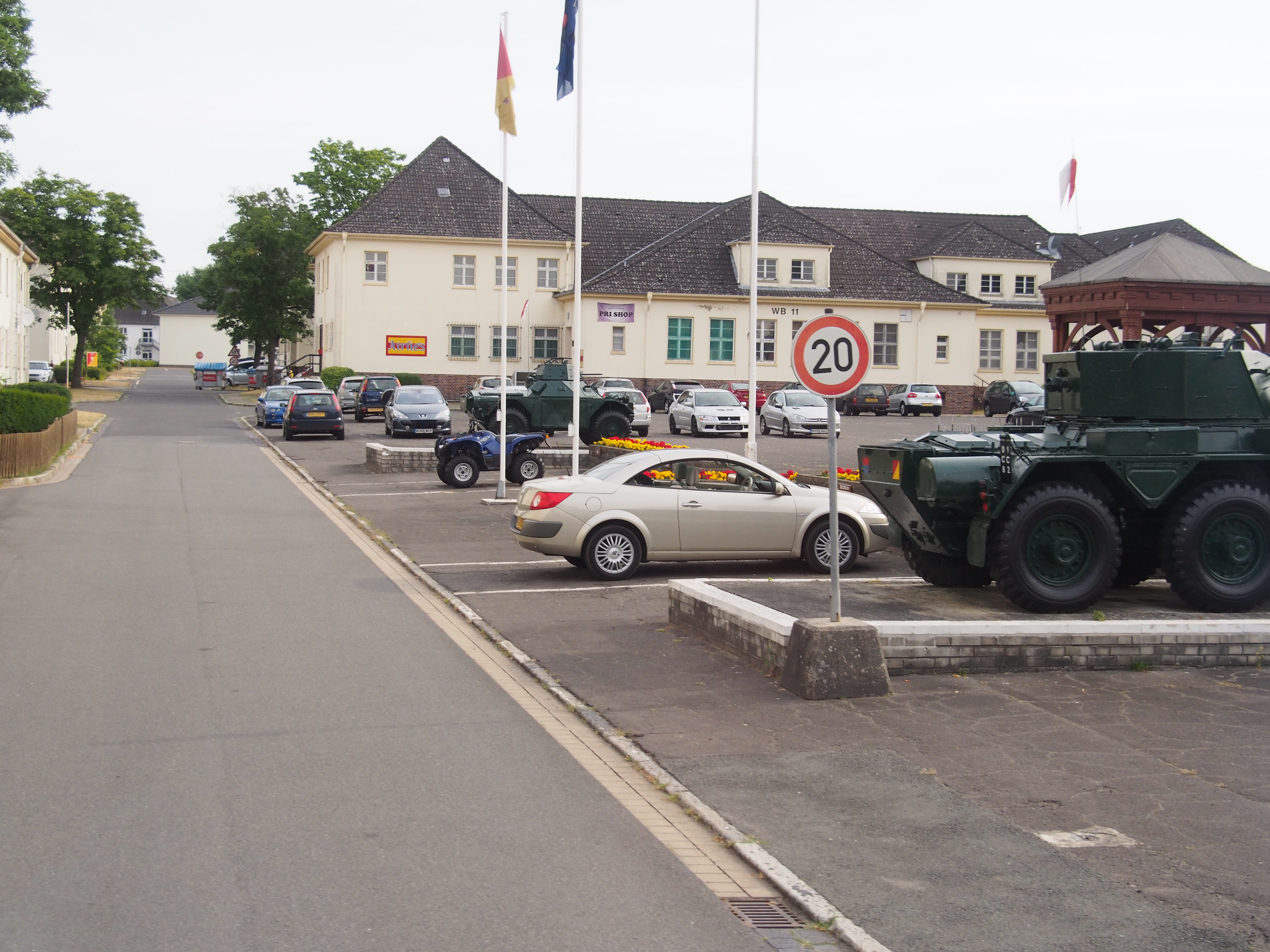
9th/12th Royal Lancers regimental lines, Haig Barracks

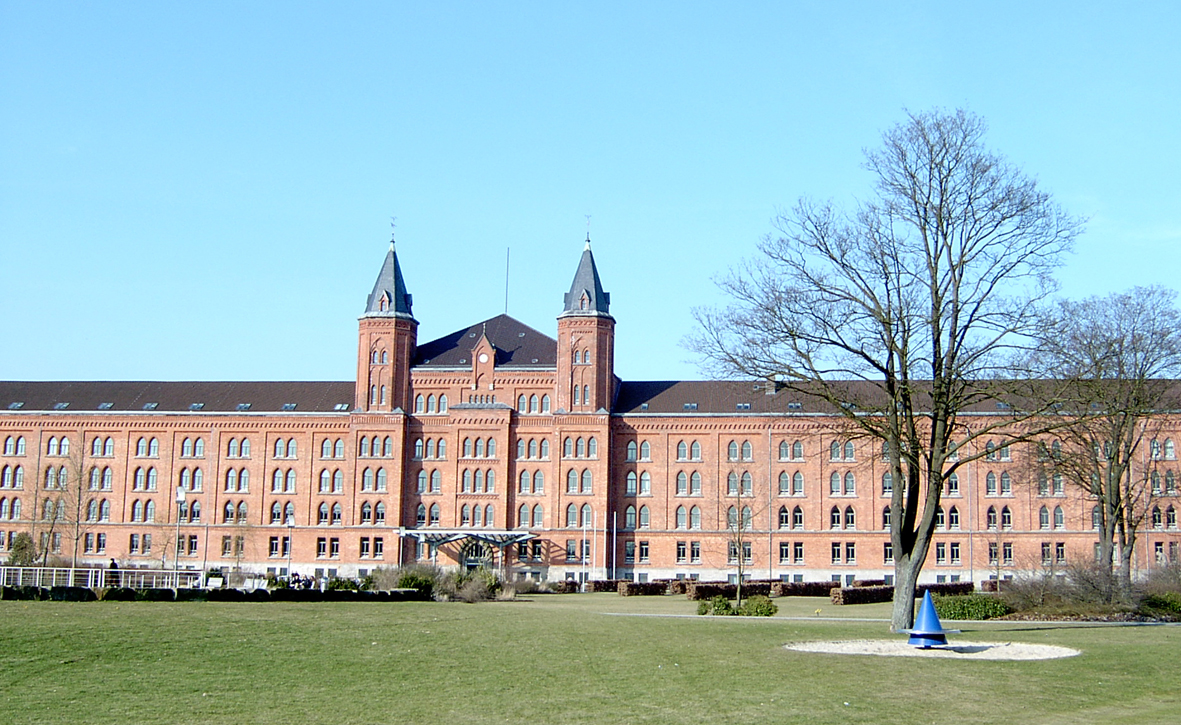
Taunton Barracks (built in 1869 as Heide Kaserne and now in use as Celle Town Hall)

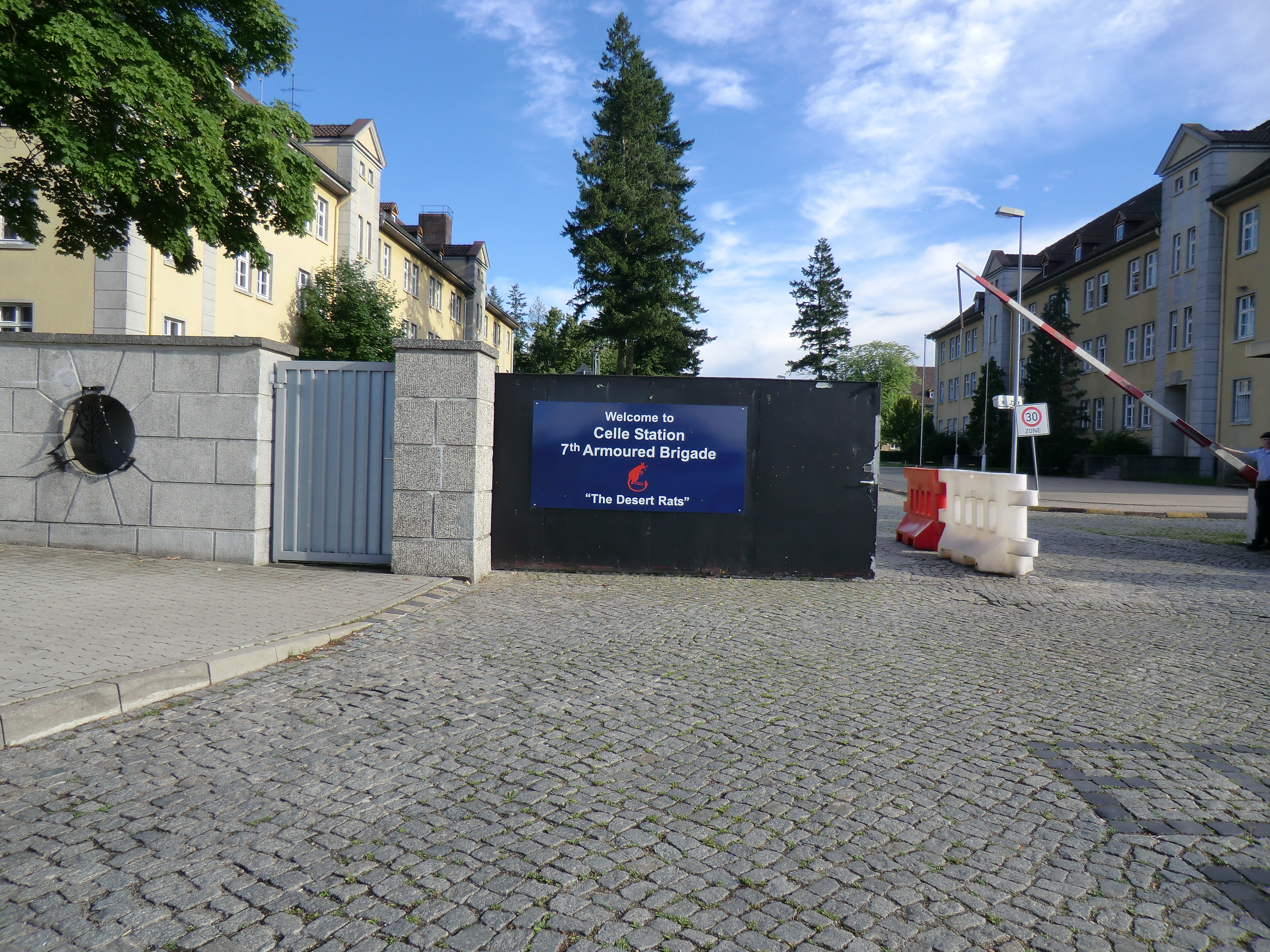
Trenchard Barracks (built in 1935 as Seeckt Kaserne after General Hans von Seeckt)

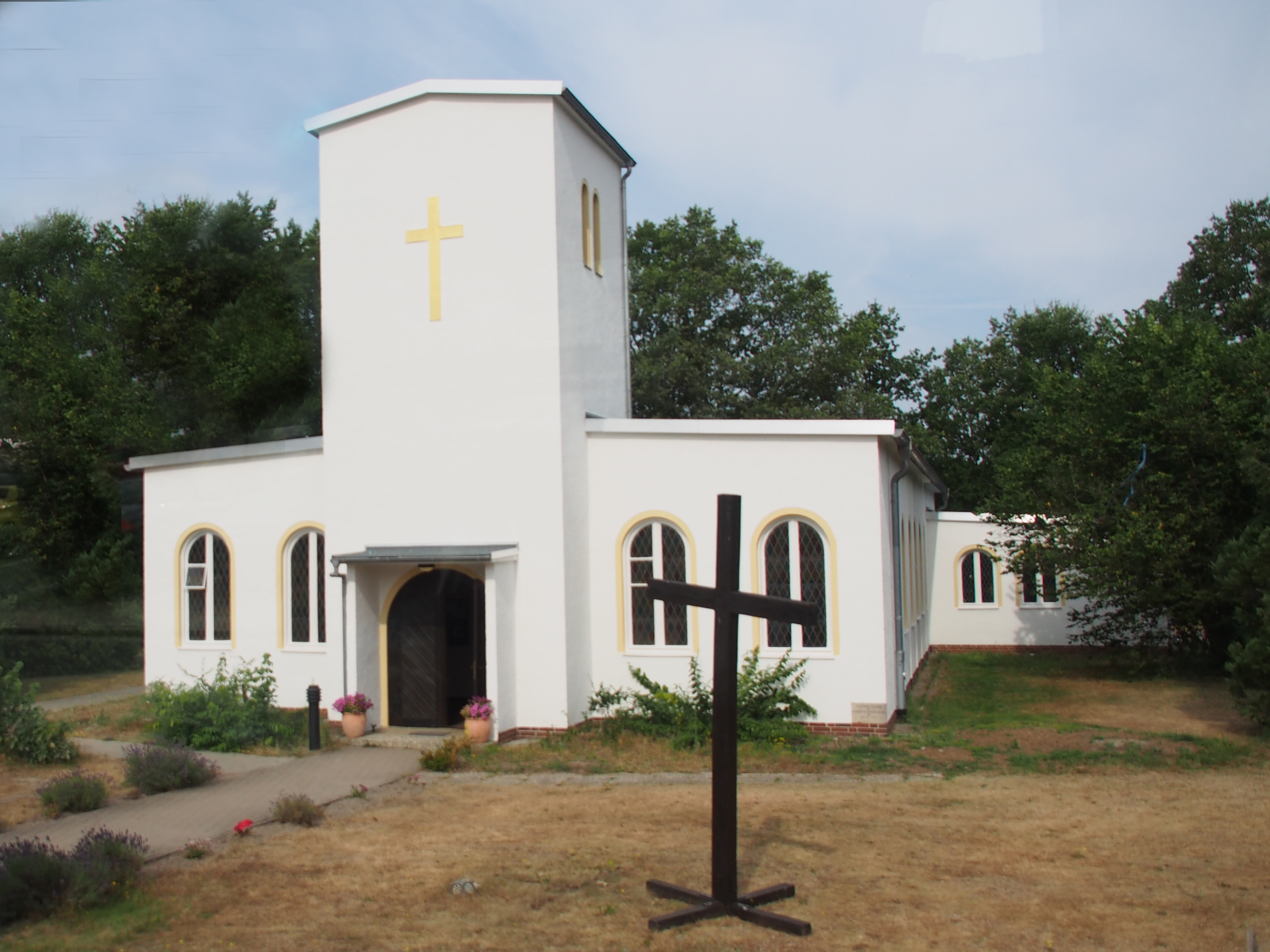
The Garrison Church

The oldest part of the garrison was Heide Kaserne (named after the Lüneburger Heide heath area) at Celle, a huge red-brick edifice which dates back to 1869 and which became Taunton Barracks after the Second World War. Also at Celle Station, Seeckt Kaserne (named after General Hans von Seeckt) was built in 1935 and became Trenchard Barracks after the War. Meanwhile, just to the north of Celle, Freiherr von Fritsch Kaserne (named after General Werner von Fritsch) was built as a Luftwaffe supply base in the 1930s and became Ironside Barracks after the War. Much of the rest of the garrison was created by the British Army, shortly after the War, by refurbishing two training and transit camps (Lager Hohne and Lager Oerbke near Fallingbostel) which had been established by the Wehrmacht just before the War.

During the Cold War, two separate brigades occupied the bases that later became Bergen-Hohne Garrison: Fallingbostel, Wolfenbüttel and Celle housed elements of 7th Armoured Brigade, whilst its headquarters, signal squadron (207 Signal Squadron) and ordnance company were based in Soltau. Hohne was home to the 22nd Armoured Brigade. Both brigades were part of the 1st Armoured Division, which also included 12th Armoured Brigade (headquartered at Osnabrück) and had its divisional headquarters and signal regiment in Verden on the River Aller.

Some 4,000–5,000 British soldiers occupied the garrison until it closed in 2015. Facilities under the garrison's control included the Bergen-Hohne Training Area. Together with families and civilians, the garrison population varied between about 10,000 and 12,000.

In January 2016 the German authorities announced that a newly established 414 Tank Battalion (German soldiers, together with a single company of Dutch troops) would be stationed at Bergen-Hohne.

== Locations ==
Locations within the garrison area included:

=== Hohne Station ===
- Caen Barracks, named after the town of Caen which was liberated by the British Army during the Second World War, having served a cavalry and tank regiment barracks since 1949, was home to 40th Regiment Royal Artillery from 1993 to 1998 and then was home to 3rd Regiment Royal Horse Artillery from 1998 until it closed in 2015.
- Campbell Barracks, named after General Sir David Campbell, having served as an artillery barracks since 1951, was home to 22nd Armoured Brigade from 1981 to 1993 and was then home to 7th Armoured Brigade from 1993 to 2014. It was also home to 32 Engineer Regiment from 1993 until it closed in 2015.
- Haig Barracks, named after Field Marshal Earl Haig, having served as an engineer barracks since 1965 and then as an artillery barracks through the 1970s and 1980s, was home to the Light Dragoons from 1992 until 2000, followed by the 9th/12th Royal Lancers from 2000 until 2015. It was also home to 2nd Medical Regiment from 2008 until it closed in 2015.
- Glyn Hughes Barracks, named after Brigadier Glyn Hughes who was medical officer of 11th Armoured Brigade at the liberation of Bergen-Belsen concentration camp, having served as a medical facility since 1969, was home to 1st Armoured Medical Regiment from 1981 until it closed in 1998.

The garrison also had quarters and facilities for the families of British forces stationed here including three Service Children's Education schools – Gloucester Secondary School, Montgomery Primary School and Slim Primary School. The station amenities include two swimming pools, beauty and hair salons, medical and dental centres and several shops selling goods from sports equipment, art and crafts, telephones and furniture. The Roundhouse building located in the garrison was used as a ballroom, then as a hospital and finally as a social gathering area. It contained a NAAFI shop.

=== Fallingbostel Station ===
- Lumsden Barracks, named after Lieutenant General Herbert Lumsden, having served as a cavalry and tank regiment barracks since 1954, was home to 3rd Battalion the Mercian Regiment from 2009 until the battalion was disbanded in July 2014.
- St Barbara Barracks, named after Saint Barbara who was the patron saint of artillerymen, having served as an artillery barracks since 1962, was home to 4th Battalion Royal Regiment of Scotland from 2006 to 2015. It was also home of 2nd Battalion Royal Electrical and Mechanical Engineers from 1993 until it closed in 2015.
- Wessex Barracks, named after the Anglo-Saxon kingdom of Wessex, having served as a cavalry and tank regiment barracks since 1957, was home to the Royal Scots Dragoon Guards from 1995 until it closed in 2015.

=== Celle Station ===
- Ironside Barracks, named after Field Marshal Lord Ironside, having served as an ordnance field park since the late 1940s, was home to 14 Signal Regiment from 1978 until it closed in 1985.
- Taunton Barracks, named after the town of Taunton, having served an infantry barracks since 1946 and then as an artillery barracks until 1951, was home to 14 Signal Regiment from 1985 until it closed in 1993.
- Trenchard Barracks, named after Marshal of the Royal Air Force Viscount Trenchard, having served as an infantry barracks from 1956, was home to 2nd Battalion Royal Regiment of Fusiliers from 2010 until the Battalion moved the Dhekalia Barracks in Cyprus in 2013.

== Garrison command ==
Officially, the responsibility for Bergen-Hohne Garrison was held by commander 7th Armoured Brigade. In practice, the day-to-day running of the garrison, however, was delegated to the deputy garrison commander in order to enable the brigade commander to concentrate on training his brigade and deploying with it on overseas operations e.g. to Iraq and Afghanistan. The deputy garrison commander had a staff of, mainly non-deployable, officers and soldiers, UK civil servants and locally employed civilians who managed and supported the garrison, its infrastructure and its families. Deputy garrison commanders included:

- c. 2003 – 2006: Colonel Anthony Singer, late King's Royal Hussars
- 2006–2009: Colonel Paul Smith, late Royal Logistic Corps
- 2009–2013: Colonel Paul Eaton, late Royal Signals
- 2013–2015: Colonel Andrew Reynolds, late Royal Artillery

== See also ==
- Westfalen Garrison
- Osnabrück Garrison

== Sources ==
- Watson, Graham; Rinald, Richard A. (2005). The British Army in Germany: An Organizational History 1947-2004. General Data. ISBN 978-0972029698.
