= Princess Zein bint Hussein =

Jordanian royal

Princess Zein bint Al Hussein
- Born: 23 April 1968 (age 58); Amman, Jordan
- Spouse: Sayyid Majdi Al-Saleh
- Issue: Ja'afar Al-Saleh; Jumana Al-Saleh; Tahani Al-Shahwa (adopted)
Names
- Zein bint Hussein bin Talal bin Abdullah
- House: Hashemite
- Father: Hussein of Jordan
- Mother: Toni Gardiner

Princess Zein bint Al Hussein (born 23 April 1968) is the sister of King Abdullah II of Jordan and the twin sister of Princess Aisha bint Hussein.

== Biography ==
Princess Zein was born on 23 April 1968 at Palestine Hospital in Al Abdali, Amman, She attended Westover School, where she captained the volleyball team and graduated in 1986; her father spoke at the commencement. She married Sayyid Majdi Al-Saleh on 3 August 1989 (younger son of Sayyid Farid Al-Saleh). (Note: The Romanization of Arabic is not standardized, and various sources render the surname of Princess Zein's husband and biological children in slightly different ways. The Jordanian government uses Saleh in the official Hashemite family tree, Routledge spells the name as-Saleh, and many other sources prefer al-Saleh (as used here).) Together, they have two biological children: Ja'afar Al-Saleh, born 9 November 1990, and Jumana Al-Saleh. They also have an adopted daughter, Tahani Al-Shahwa.

Princess Zein has been involved in humanitarian efforts since the 1990s. She offered financial support to the Gulf Peace Team, a nonviolent protest group during the Gulf War. In 1997, King Hussein ordered Hashemiyeh Palace, then used to house foreign dignitaries, converted into an orphanage after learning of poor conditions for orphans in Amman. He selected Princess Zein to run the new facility and act as its patron; it opened nine months later as Dar Al Bir. In 2013, she visited Miami Children's Hospital for a demonstration of telehealth programs.

She and her husband also own Royal Ja'afar Stud, where they breed Arabian horses.

Princess Zein and her half-sister Alia are also sisters-in-law, with Alia married to Majdi Al-Saleh's brother.

== Honours ==
=== National ===
- Jordan
  - Knight Grand Cordon of the Supreme Order of the Renaissance, Special Class
  - Knight Grand Cordon of the Order of the Star of Jordan

=== Foreign ===
- Brunei: Knight Grand Cross with Collar of the Order of Merit
- Norway: Knight Grand Cross of the Royal Norwegian Order of Merit
