= Hostert (Schwalmtal) =

Coordinates: 51.2095°N 6.3087°E

Hostert is a residential area in the municipality of Schwalmtal, in the German county of Viersen. In 1970, it merged with Waldniel, 2.5 km further west, to form the municipality of Schwalmtal. It lies on the state road (Landstraße) from Schwalmtal to Gladbach. To the south it borders on the A 52 motorway. Linguistically Hostert means Hofstatt ("farmstead").

The settlement includes the complex of St. Josefsheim, built in 1909. After being built as a Franciscan priory, the monks were forced out by the Nazi regime and it was used as part of their child euthanasia programme. After World War II it was used as a British Military Hospital and then in 1963 it became Kent School, Hostert, a British military boarding school. The site has stood empty since the closure of the school in 1993.
