= Archie Cecil Thomas White =

Archie White
- Born: 5 October 1890; Boroughbridge, West Riding of Yorkshire, England
- Died: 20 May 1971 (aged 80); Camberley, Surrey, England
- Military career
- Allegiance: United Kingdom
- Branch: British Army
- Service years: 1914–1947
- Rank: Colonel
- Units: Green Howards; Royal Army Education Corps
- Commands: Chief Education Officer, 21st Army Group
- Conflicts: World War I Russian Civil War; World War II
- Awards: Victoria Cross; Military Cross

Colonel Archie Cecil Thomas White VC MC (5 October 1890 – 20 May 1971) was an English recipient of the Victoria Cross, the highest and most prestigious award for gallantry in the face of the enemy that can be awarded to British and Commonwealth forces.

== Early life and education ==
White was born on 5 October 1890 in Boroughbridge, West Riding of Yorkshire, England. His father, Thomas White (also Wright; 1838-1911), was thrice married and worked as a draper, grocer and outfitter. His mother, Jeannie née Finlayson (c. 1852-1924), was Scottish. Archie was educated at the Municipal Secondary Day School, Harrogate. Having been awarded a scholarship, he studied English literature at King's College, London, and graduated with a Bachelor of Arts (BA) degree in 1913. While at university, he was a cadet of the Officers Training Corps.

== Military service ==
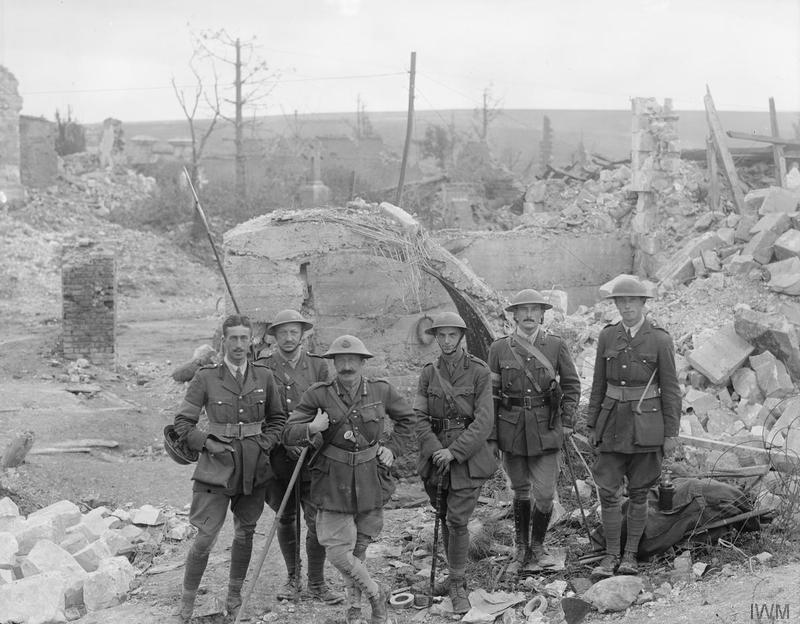
White (left) with other member's of 137th Brigade staff during the Hundred Days Offensive 1918

On 12 September 1914, White was commissioned as a temporary second lieutenant in the British Army. Having been assigned to the 6th (Service) Battalion, Alexandra, Princess of Wales's Own (Yorkshire Regiment), he was promoted to temporary lieutenant on 10 December 1914.

White was 25 years old, and a temporary captain in what was later known as the Green Howards, when the following deed took place for which he was awarded the VC during the First World War:

Between 21 September and 1 October 1916, Captain White commanded the troops holding the southern and western sections of Stuff Redoubt, France. During this four-day period, his unit maintained its position while under artillery fire and multiple counterattacks. Despite limited supplies and ammunition, White remained in command as the opposing forces entered the redoubt. He subsequently led a counter-attack that resulted in the recovery of the southern and western faces of the position.

On 30 June 1917, he was transferred to the General Staff as a general staff officer (grade 3). On 28 March 1918, he was appointed brigade major of the 137th Brigade commanded by J. V. Campbell VC. He returned to the General Staff as a GSO 3rd grade on 25 April 1919.

On 25 November 1920, White transferred to the Army Education Corps with a permanent commission and the rank of major. On 8 January 1925, he was appointed commandant of Queen Victoria School, a boarding school in Dunblane. He rose achieved the rank of colonel. He wrote a history of the corps, published in 1963.

== Commemoration ==
His Victoria Cross is displayed at the Green Howards Museum in Richmond, North Yorkshire, England.

A book on his life and that of his school friend and fellow VC Donald Simpson Bell called A Breed Apart by Richard Leake was published by Great North Publishing in 2008. "The story of White and Bell deserves to be known by a wider audience. To have two school friends both awarded the VC on the same battlefield is probably unique in British military history," said Richard Leake.

== Bibliography ==
- Gliddon, Gerald (2011) [1991]. Somme 1916. VCs of the First World War. The History Press. ISBN 978-0-7524-6303-2.
