= Prince Rupert School =

Secondary school in Rinteln, Lower Saxony, Germany (1947–2014)

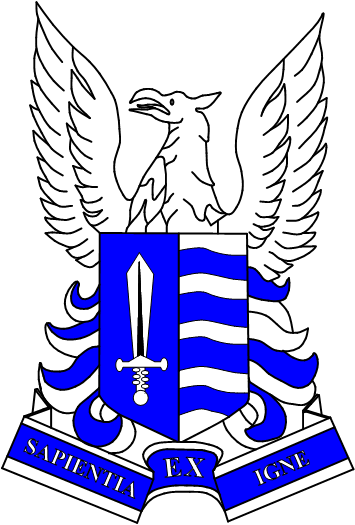

Location
- Wilhelm-Busch Weg, 31; Rinteln, Lower Saxony, BFPO 31 / 31737; Germany
- Coordinates: 52°12′24″N 9°05′42″E

Information
- Type: SCE day and boarding school
- Motto: Sapienta ex Igne (Wisdom from the flames)
- Established: Wilhelmshaven: 1 July 1947. Opened 7 September 1947. Rinteln: September 1972
- Closed: Wilhelmshaven: July 1972. Rinteln: 18 July 2014
- Local authority: Service Children's Education (SCE)
- Department for Education URN: 132389 Tables
- Ofsted: Reports
- Chair of Governors: Lt Col Bazeley
- Head teacher: A. Price
- Gender: Co-educational
- Age: 11 to 18
- Enrolment: 1,000 at its height
- Houses: Rinteln, Kendle (previously Weser & Schaumburg)

Prince Rupert School was a secondary school in Rinteln, Lower Saxony, Germany, operated by the Service Children's Education for children of military personnel and employees of the former British sector of West Germany. Over the years, it enrolled both day and weekly boarding pupils from the military garrisons of Buckeburg, Detmold, Hameln, Herford, Hohne, Nienburg, Bunde, Hanover, Hildesheim, Minden, Osnabrück (following closure of Edinburgh School in Munster), Paderborn, and Rinteln. It was originally located at the North Sea port city of Wilhelmshaven, before moving to Rinteln. After the school was closed, it served as a camp for refugees. In 2023/2024, the entire school was demolished.

== History ==
Prince Rupert School (PRS) takes its name from the former coastal establishment HMS Royal Rupert, which had previously been a Kriegsmarine stronghold during Nazi rule, located at the scenic port city of Wilhelmshaven on the North Sea coast. The school has its beginnings from "Operation Union", which allowed Army and RAF personnel based in Allied-occupied West Germany to bring their families over. PRS is believed to be the first comprehensive, co-educational, boarding school under the terms of the Education Act 1944 and was one of the first schools established in Germany to exclusively educate children of British military personnel. Housed in a block of buildings along the port, it was formally handed over on 1 July 1947, by the lowering of the Royal Navy's white ensign and the raising of the Union flag. Present at this ceremony were many of the first 70 pupils who were attending school for a one-month trial period, prior to the full complement reporting to the school on 7 September 1947; The first pupil to set foot on the site was Peter Mettyear (Drake House 1947-1949). Some pupils missed the ceremony as their truck became lost on its way to Wilhelmshaven. John Smitherman, the first headmaster, chose that name in recognition of the kindness and help he had received from the Royal Navy personnel of HMS Royal Rupert. The official opening ceremony of the school by George Tomlinson MP, Minister of Education, took place on 11 May 1948.

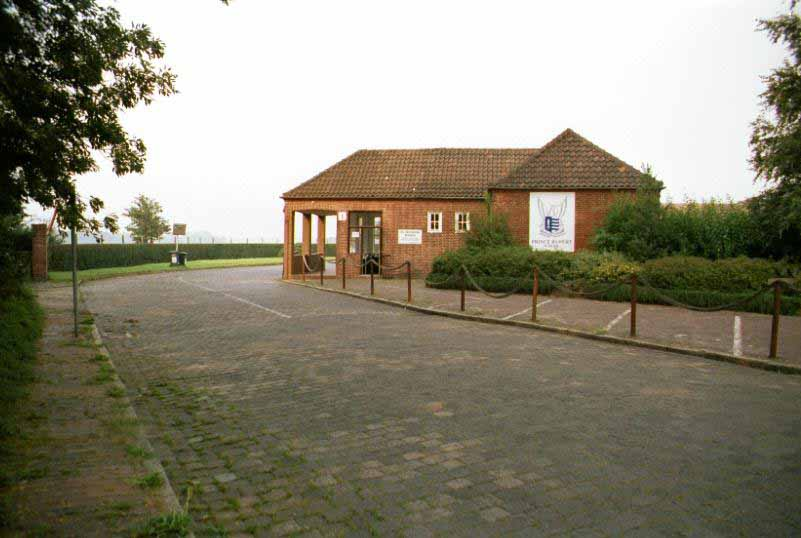
PRS Wilhelmshaven main gate

During the Cold War, it also occasionally took in children of Commonwealth servicemen. The 1960s saw a sharp increase in pupil numbers mainly due to the final closure of Lancaster School in the former Osnabrück base. At its height, there were over 600 pupils, most of whom were boarders.

As the Army and RAF were gradually pulling out of Germany (as an invading force, and becoming an occupying force), pupil numbers declined until the Service Children's Education authorities decided it was no longer feasible to run a school at Wilhelmshaven. A new location was chosen, in the town of Rinteln, with PRS Wilhelmshaven closing in June 1972.

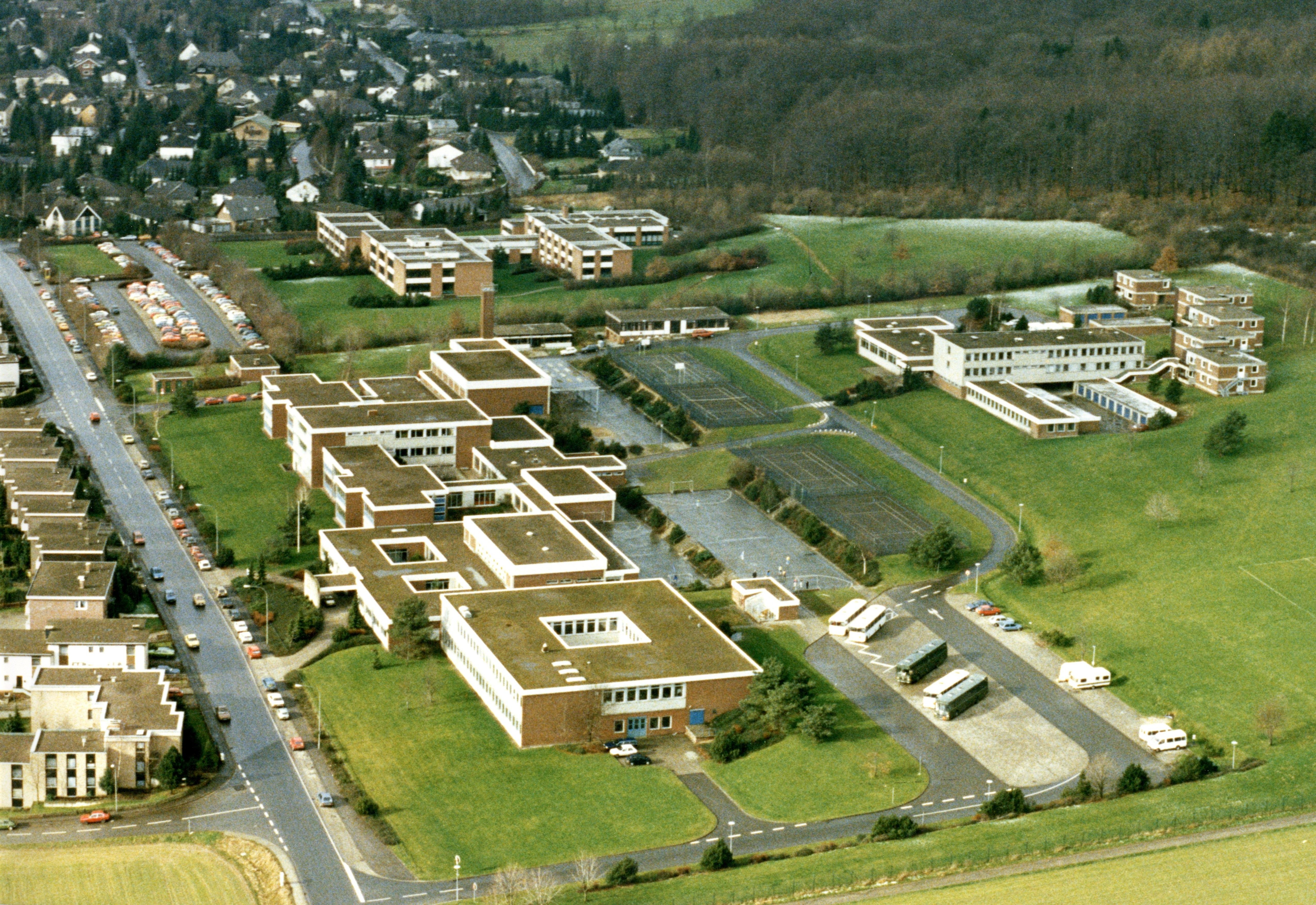
PRS Rinteln – aerial view from the west

The school re-opened as a day school in September 1972, on a purpose-built site on the outskirts of Rinteln that cost DM 18.5 million, although it wasn't until 6 June 1973 that the buildings were officially opened by Sir and Lady Alexander, the then Secretary of the Association of Education Committees. The new school, which was designed to double up as a war time hospital to cope with overflow from BMH Rinteln, had a teachers' mess to the rear for unmarried staff (married teachers were generally accommodated in quarters within the environs of the BMH). However, in 1982, the mess was renamed 'The Lodge' and repurposed as weekly boarding accommodation.

In July 1997, Prince Rupert School celebrated its 50th anniversary with many celebrations, including a march through the local town centre featuring street performances by pupils. There was also a Reunion in Wilhelmshaven attended by about 500 ex-pupils and ex-staff.

Following the UK government's Strategic Defence Review in 1998 (updated in 2002), it was decided to withdraw the British forces from Germany by 2020. The result meant that dwindling pupil numbers would lead to the inevitable closure of the school. The UK Government SDSR of 2010 brought planned the closure of Germany forward to 2018, and with the restructure of the remaining units around Paderborn and Bielefeld Garrisons, this meant that PRS was no longer a viable asset, with King's School in Gütersloh being chosen to become the final secondary school to remain open.

At its height, the school's population in Rinteln was around 1000 pupils. This reduced in the early 1990s to 500 following the closure of garrison's at Minden, Hanover, Hildesheim and Bunde. At the end it was fewer than 50, with around 14 of them as weekly boarders.

The school held a celebration to mark the closure of the school over the weekend of 28–29 June 2014, which was attended by a large number of ex-pupils. A presentation to the local Stadt was made on 30 June, at which a permanent monument to the school was unveiled. The piece is shaped like an obelisk, made up with clay artwork from the last students of the school, and topped with a golden phoenix.

Prince Rupert School closed its doors to the final students at 1400 CET on Tuesday 15 July 2014, and formally closed on Friday 18 July 2014.

In October 2015, the German Federal Government reopened the site and used the former school buildings accommodation for refugees, with up to 600 residents housed at one time. This continued for about three years before once again, the site fell silent and became overgrown.

In 2020 plans were submitted to the Rinteln council to change the land purpose of three areas; the former school site, and two areas either side of Kurt-Schumacher-Straße (East - the old Hockey Pitches and West - The Sports fields adjoining BMH Rinteln); all of which are set to become residential areas.

== Curriculum ==
Like all SCE schools, PRS followed the National Curriculum and was inspected by Ofsted. Besides the mainstream GCSE and A Level subjects, BTEC and GNVQ (formerly) qualifications were also offered.

In 2011, the school was rated "outstanding" and "good" in all aspects by Ofsted inspectors.

== Boarding ==
The Prince Rupert Lodge opened in 1982, using modern and comfortable accommodation that was formerly used to house unmarried teachers. Located behind the main school building, it offered a 'home from home' to those students who lived there throughout the week (weekend boarding was not provided).

Pupils were looked after by house parents, a resident matron, two nurses and visiting tutors. With the closure of Osnabrück garrison (the largest catchment area for the school) in 2008, student numbers dropped dramatically. This resulted in the closure of the area of The Lodge known as the "Boys Levels" in 2009. The drop in numbers prompted SCE to move those day pupils from Detmold (who had previously attended King's School, Gütersloh), to PRS to become weekly boarders. The Lodge closed its doors for the final time in June 2014, a month before the school closed.

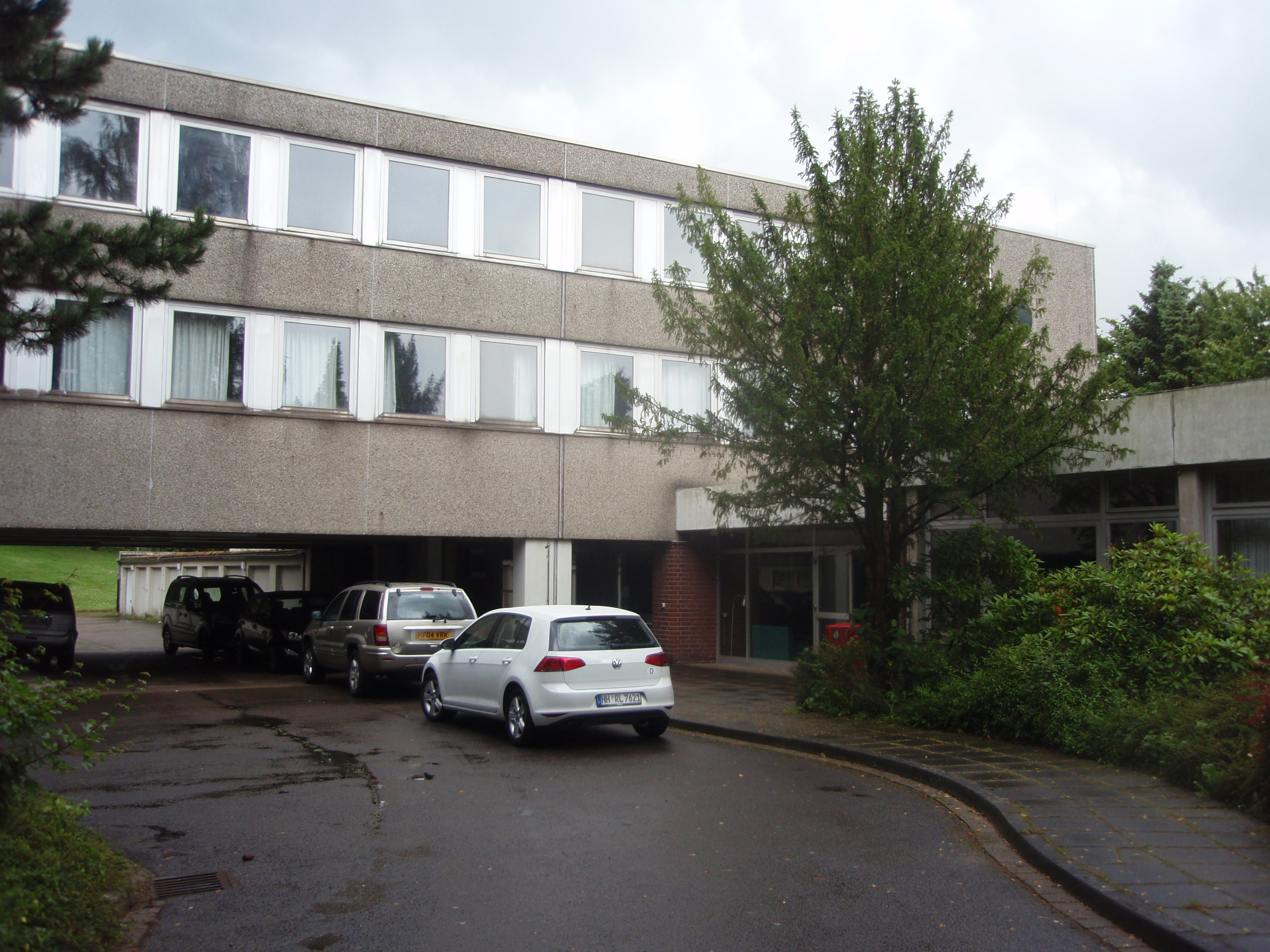
Main entrance

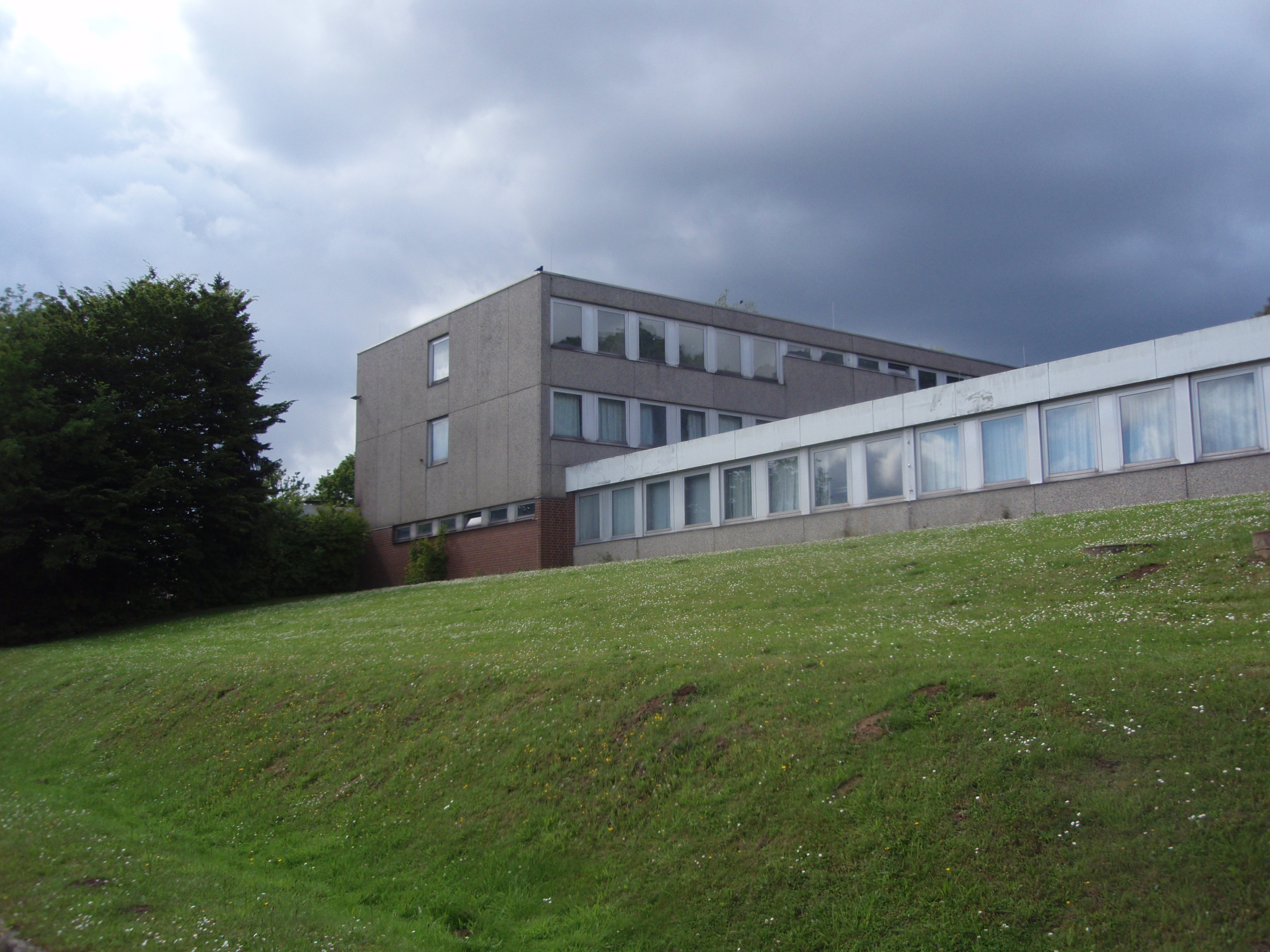
Main building boys' ground-floor rooms, and girls' levels

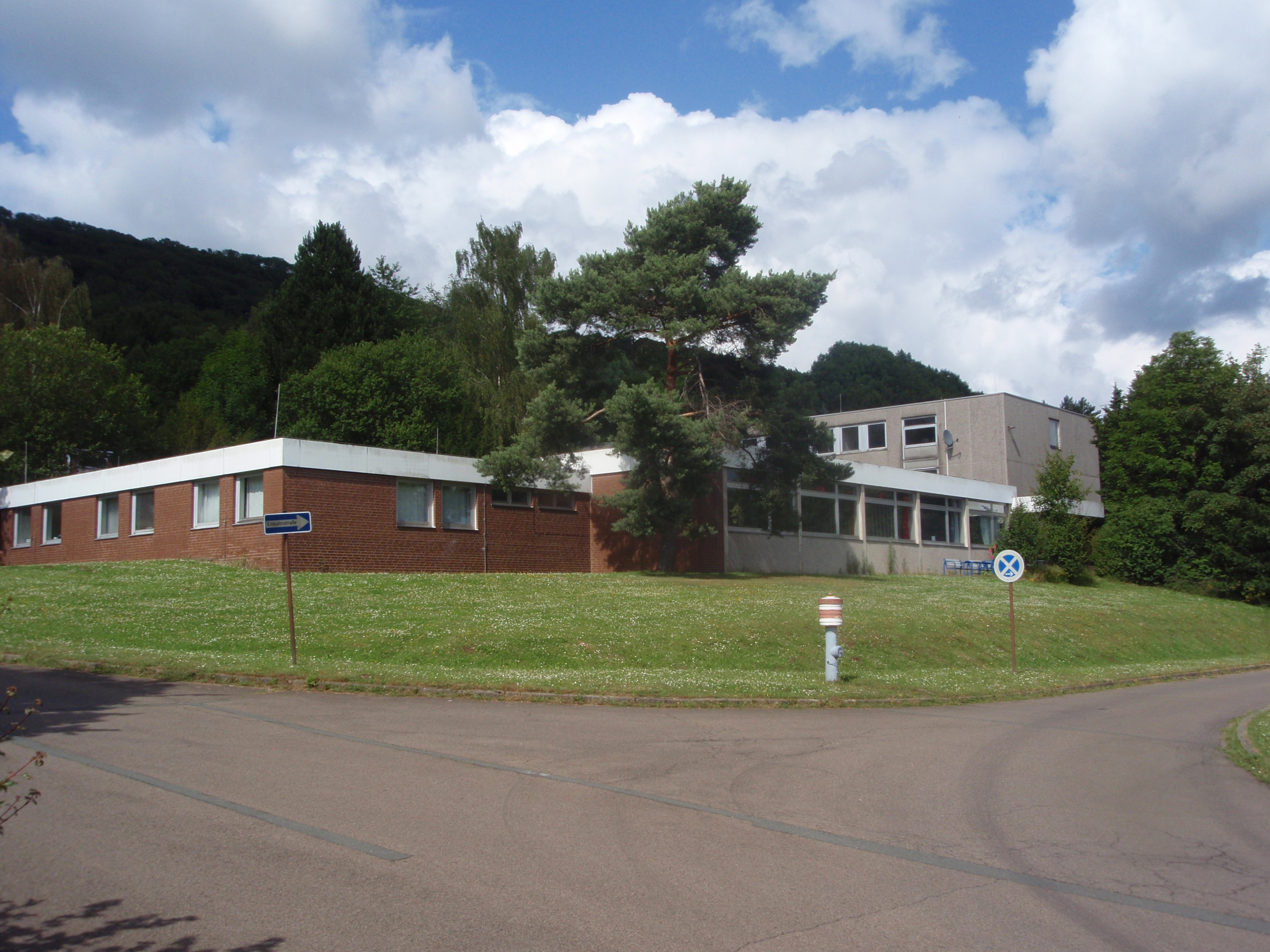
Main building and sixth-form rooms
