= British Families Education Service =

Former UK government agency

Agency overview
- Formed: 1946; 80 years ago
- Preceding agency: Army Education Corps
- Dissolved: 1997
- Superseding agency: Service Children's Education
- Parent agency: Ministry of Defence
- Website: SCE

The British Families Education Service (BFES) was an organisation set up by the British Government in 1946 to run schools for the children of British military and government personnel serving in West Germany.

Prior to 1946, Army Education Corps was responsible for the training of teachers (Queen's Army Schoolmistresses) to teach soldiers' children at garrisons. With the end of World War II and the establishment of the British Army of the Rhine as part of the Allied occupation of Germany, personnel were allowed to bring their families over through "Operation Union". This presented a problem for the War Office as these children needed to attend school. BFES was established by the Foreign Office in cooperation with the War Office and Ministry of Education.

The first school officially opened by the BFES was Prince Rupert School, then located at the coastal town of Wilhelmshaven. LEAs were asked to aid in the recruitment of teachers to the newly opened schools in Germany. Two other boarding schools were opened during the 1950s: one (Windsor School) at Hamm in Westphalia and another (King Alfred's School) at Plön in Northern Germany. This second school was originally a German naval cadet training centre. During the period 1957–1959, it housed some 700 pupils - half boys, half girls. At the end of the school year in 1959, it was formally handed back to the German Navy.

Over the years, the BFES and its later incarnations opened schools at British Armed Forces bases around the world, such as in Hong Kong, Singapore, Cyprus, Malta, Gibraltar, Mauritius and Malaya. During the early 1970s, BFES became the Service Children's Education Authority, an agency overseen by the British Army. In 1989 it came under a new administration and was renamed Service Children's Schools before adopting its current name, Service Children's Education.

== Collections ==
In 2001 a collection of archives of the British Families Education Service / Service Children's Education Association were deposited at UCL Special Collections. The papers can be used to research the history of the schools and the lives of the teachers working in them. UCL Special Collections does not hold the official records of the British Families Education Service (BFES), Service Children's Schools (SCS) or Service Children's Education (SCE). These were the formal bodies responsible for the education of children of British Forces and the Ministry of Defence personnel stationed outside of the UK. The formal records are held by The National Archives. Log books of some schools are held by the National Army Museum.

UCL Special Collections also hold material relating to individual teachers who worked for the BFES: Mimi Hatton and James Lumsden.
