= King's School (Gütersloh) =

Coordinates: 51°53′53″N 8°24′53″E

- Mansergh Barracks, North Rhine-Westphalia, BFPO 113; Germany

Information
- Type: SCE day and boarding school
- Motto: Working together for success
- Established: 1960
- Closed: 2019
- Department for Education URN: 132382 Tables
- Ofsted: Reports
- Chair of Governors: Col. Lorne McMonagle
- Head teacher: Mrs E. Bryson
- Gender: Coeducational
- Age: 11 to 18
- Enrolment: 500
- Houses: Darwin (till 2018), Churchill, Redgrave, Austen (Former House names:Lancaster, York, Tudor, Stewart)
- Colour: Black

King's School was a secondary school in Gütersloh, North Rhine-Westphalia, Germany, between 1960 and 2019. Serving the children of British military families stationed in the area, it was the largest school in Service Children's Education (SCE). It was the only SCE secondary school in the area and also served children from bases in Bielefeld, Herford, Detmold, Lippstadt, and Paderborn.

== History ==
King's School opened its doors to its first pupils on 19 September 1960 in what was then West Germany. The first headteacher was Mr Jack Reynish. Later heads included Mr D.D. Rooney, Mr Ken Jones, Mr Rob McGraw and Mrs Sheila Hargreaves. Boarding accommodation at King's Hall opened in September 1994.

== Campus ==
Situated within Mansergh Barracks, the school buildings were originally barrack blocks but were modernised throughout to provide spacious teaching accommodation. The school also housed the Gütersloh Music Centre which provided weekly instrumental tuition for about 200 young people.

The playing fields, including astro-turf, were extensive, with pitches for hockey, football, rugby, netball, cricket and athletics. Two gymnasia were complemented by the Army gymnasium / Sports Hall. The school also had access to a nearby swimming pool and a tartan surface athletics track for Sports Day.

== Curriculum ==
The school followed the National Curriculum.

== Extracurricular activities ==
Student organisations and activities included art club, chess, dance, digital photography, drama, the Duke of Edinburgh award scheme, fashion design, film club, gardening, jogging and fitness club, juggling, Language Ambassadors, lawn games, karate, printmaking, quilting, remote control cars, study support, textiles, ultimate frisbee, Warhammer, World Challenge, and yearbook.

Sports included athletics, basketball, football, golf, hockey, netball, rugby, and tennis. Students competed in lunchtime inter-form competitions, SCE inter-school festivals and GISST, the International Schools Group competitions. The school was recognised with the Sportsmark Award twice since 2003.

== Notable former pupils ==
- Tim Montgomerie, co-founder of the Centre for Social Justice, creator of the ConservativeHome website, columnist at The Times newspaper, blogger and political activist
- Cpl Gordon Pritchard, the 100th British servicemember killed in the Iraq War
