= Royal Army Educational Corps =

Former unit of the British Army (1865–1992)

- Active: 2 July 1845 – 6 April 1992
- Allegiance: United Kingdom
- Branch: British Army
- Type: Education
- HQ: Eltham Palace, London
- March: Quick - Gaudeamus Igitur; Slow - The Good Comrade

Commanders
- Colonel in Chief: The Duchess of Gloucester, GCVO

Insignia
- Abbreviation: RAEC

The Royal Army Educational Corps (RAEC) was a corps of the British Army tasked with educating and instructing personnel in a diverse range of skills. On 6 April 1992 it became the Educational and Training Services Branch (ETS) of the Adjutant General's Corps.

== History ==
=== 1846–1914 ===
On 2 July 1845 the Corps of Army Schoolmasters was formed, staffed by warrant officers and senior non-commissioned officers, as well as a few commissioned officers who served as inspectors and headmasters.

In 1859 its duties were extended from simple schooling within the Army to assume responsibility for the Army schools and libraries and in 1903 the Army schoolmasters fell under the jurisdiction of the Adjutant-General. By the early 1900s, soldiers began to be admitted to evening classes, and some garrisons opened vocational classes. In 1914, a committee was set up for the "industrial training of soldiers", underlining the Army's intent to properly equip soldiers for civilian life.

=== First World War ===
Despite the strains of the First World War on the British Army, education of soldiers did not stop. The British Army was circulated in and out of the front line, reserve line, and rest areas. This allowed education to continue, albeit in a disrupted fashion. Even whilst in the trenches, boredom meant the soldiery desired news and information, and thus officers would organise lectures to satisfy these needs. The issue of resettlement was also raised by the war, and so a scheme was established to prepare men for civilian life. Under the Army Educational Scheme, soldiers who were educated by the Corps would receive a certificate of education. This certificate would then aid them in finding a job and competing with the thousands of other soldiers that would be demobilised and would also need a job once the war was over.

=== 1920–1939 ===
A Royal Warrant established the Army Educational Corps on 15 June 1920. The wartime task of its members was to "assist by all means in their power the maintenance of a high spirit of devotion and well being in their units". Peacetime duties were more clearly defined, and Army Educational Corps personnel were expected to do specialist and advisory work, with the bulk of the teaching to be done by regimental officers. By 1938, Army Educational Corps recruits were required to be between 20 and 25 years of age. They had to be either qualified teachers or university graduates. They initially enlisted for twelve years and were immediately promoted Sergeant.

=== Second World War ===
The Second World War saw the normal work of the corps radically change. The need for both physically and mentally competent troops resulted in an increased workload for the Army Education Centres. The AEC began to operate in a variety of different theatres and locations throughout the war, including the unexpected task of sending news-sheet teams with the D-Day landings. Recruits saw training time double, with education being conducted in hospitals, prisons and displaced persons camps. The end of the war saw the Corps involved in the daunting task of returning a national Army to civilian occupation. Unit Education Officers gave pre-release advice whilst the Corps organised an extensive network of "formation colleges".

=== 1946–1992 ===
On 28 November 1946 the AEC was honoured with the title of "Royal". In Britain this honour must be bestowed directly by the monarch, and allows the relevant service or organisation the right to use a representation of the crown in their badge. King George VI contributed to the design of the new badge. After the war the RAEC continued its work educating soldiers and helping them to resettle into civilian life. That same year, the responsibility of teaching the personnel's children was transferred to the newly formed British Families Education Service.

From 1962 it was staffed exclusively by commissioned officers and the non-commissioned personnel were either commissioned or left the Army.

In 1971, the education of soldiers was radically changed. Recruits joining the Army were generally poorly qualified and although the tasks of soldiering were easily mastered, the additional responsibilities involved in being an NCO proved more difficult. The new system introduced the Education Promotion Certificate. This was designed to specifically meet the training needs of potential Sergeants and Warrant Officers.

In 1992 the RAEC lost its Corps status and became the Educational and Training Services Branch of the new Adjutant General's Corps.

== Headquarters ==
The Army Educational Corps established its depot at Shorncliffe Army Camp in 1920. It then moved all its administration to Eltham Palace in 1948. On 15 May 1990, the Provisional IRA exploded a 10lb plastic explosive bomb in a flowerbed outside the Eltham Palace headquarters, injuring seven civilians. Following the formation of the Educational and Training Services Branch of the new Adjutant General's Corps, staff moved to Worthy Down Camp in 1992.

== Army Schools of Education ==
The Royal Army Educational Corps managed a number of Army Schools of Education:
Inter-war

- The Army School of Education, Shorncliffe Army Camp (from 1920)

Post-war

- The Army School of Education, Buchanan Castle, Drymen (from 1945)
- The Army School of Education, Eltham Palace, Greenwich (from 1945)
- The Army School of Education, Walker Lines, Bodmin in Cornwall (from 1948).
- The Army School of Education, Wakefield (from 1945)
- The Army School of Education, Wilton Park, Beaconsfield (from 1950)

Current

- The Army School of Education, Worthy Down Barracks (from 1992)

== Victoria Cross ==
Two Army Educational Corps officers won the Victoria Cross in the First World War: Archie Cecil Thomas White and James Lennox Dawson.

=== Notable personnel ===
- Category:Royal Army Educational Corps officers
- Category:Royal Army Educational Corps soldiers

== See also ==
- Queen's Army Schoolmistresses
- Naval Education Service
- Royal Air Force Educational Service
- Royal Australian Army Educational Corps
