= Queen's Army Schoolmistresses =

The Queen's Army Schoolmistresses were female military schoolteachers who assisted the Royal Army Educational Corps and its predecessors in teaching the children of soldiers in British Army garrison schools. They were formed as the Army Schoolmistresses in 1848 and received the "Queen's" prefix in 1928. Some were even taken as POWs by the Japanese. They were disbanded in 1970.
