= Gloucester School =

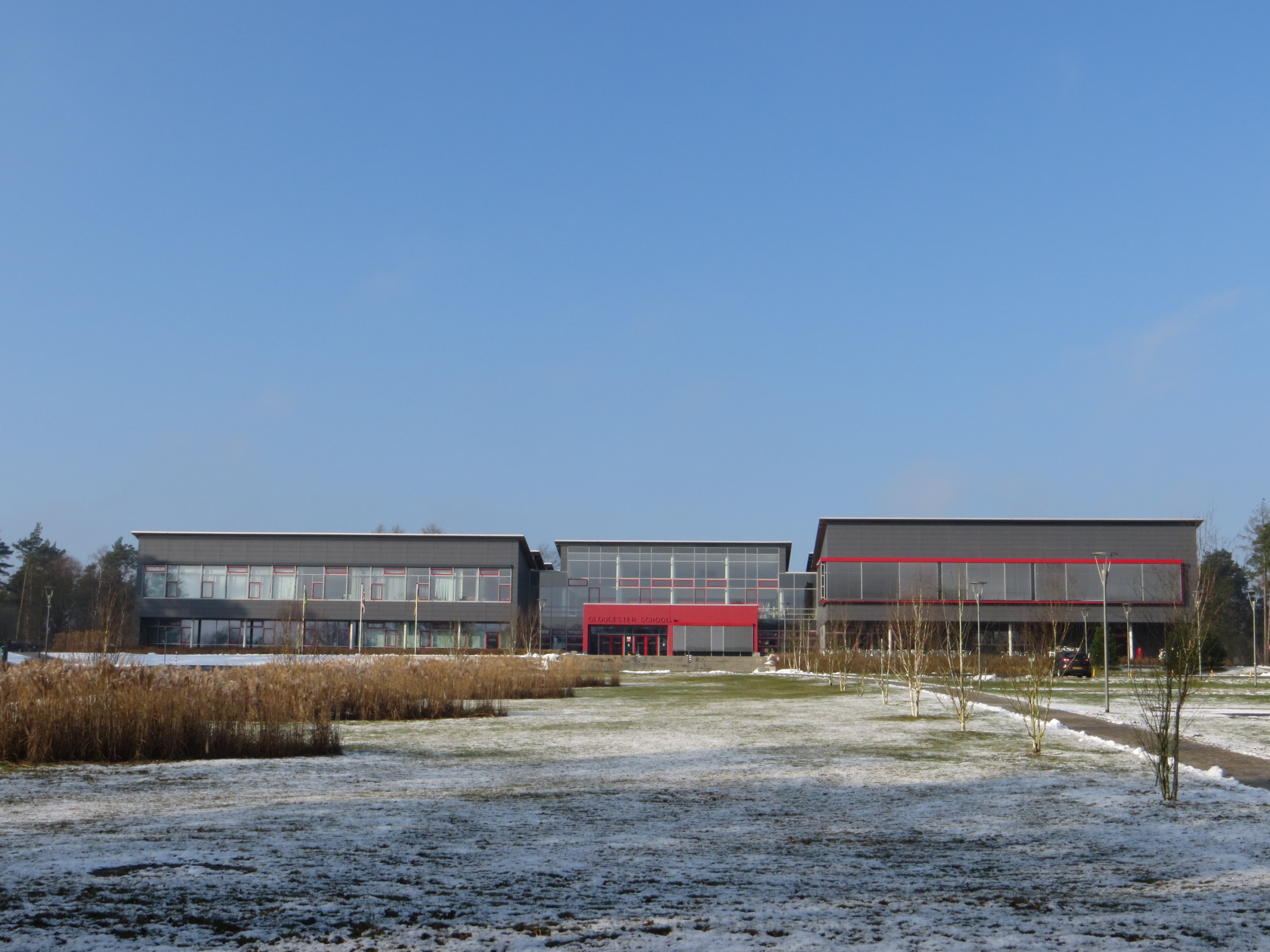
- Gloucester School, Hohne
- Hohne, Lower Saxony, BFPO 30; Germany

Information
- Type: SCE school
- Established: 1962
- Closed: 2015
- Local authority: SCE
- Department for Education URN: 132380 Tables
- Ofsted: Reports
- Chair of Governors: Col A Reynolds
- Acting Head: Mrs M Strong BA (Hons)
- Staff: ~39
- Gender: Co-educational
- Age: 11 to 18
- Enrolment: ~490
- Houses: yes
- Colours: black and white (uniform); navy or sky blue (sport)
- Website: www.gloucester.sceschools.com

Gloucester School was a British military secondary school in Hohne, Germany. It was one of several secondary schools operated by the Service Children's Education in support of British Forces Germany in the post-Cold War period. It served children of military personnel and civilian employees of Bergen-Hohne Garrison with its stations at Fallingbostel, Celle and Hohne (near Bergen). It was a day school only, with no boarding facilities.

== History ==
The original school was opened in 1962 in what had become the Glyn Hughes hospital, a former Wehrmacht hospital on the Bergen-Hohne Training Area. In 1965, however, they moved to a purpose-built school a short distance away in the woods on the Belser Berg ("Belsen Hill") behind Hohne Station. The Glyn Hughes hospital still exists, but is now derelict and occasionally used for FIBUA training by troops.

The old school was demolished in summer 2007 and replaced by the present one built slightly further up the hill. It was opened officially by The Duchess of Gloucester in September 2007.

Following a visit by Gloucester schoolchildren to the then minister-president of Lower Saxony, David McAllister, in Hanover on 28 February 2012, the leader of the state government paid a reciprocal visit to Gloucester School on 6 September 2012.

The school closed in summer 2015 when the British Army left Lower Saxony.

== Curriculum ==
The school followed the National Curriculum and was inspected by Ofsted. All tutor groups were mixed ability. The full range of National Curriculum subjects and Religious Education was offered in key stages 3 and 4 supplemented by a social education programme.

== Activities ==
Gloucester School offered a wide range of extra-curricular activities. The school had a house system which formed the basis for sporting competitions, and all students were encouraged to participate. The school also took part in inter-school sports within Germany.

After-school activities were offered three times a week including art, dance, drama and various sports. The school also had a fully equipped music centre.

There were annual ski holidays for the upper and lower school organised by the Youth Service. Trips also took place during Activities Week in the summer term to places such as Bremen, Hamburg and Hanover. Other outings included skiing and snowboarding at the nearby Snowdome and camping in the Harz mountains.

== Performance ==
According to the Ofsted inspection in Feb 2011, Gloucester was "a good school with some outstanding features".

== Headteachers ==
- 1962–1967 Mr John L Glazier, MA Cantab
- 1967–72 Mr George Tallack
- 1982–1986 Mr Hylton Thomas OBE MED FCP MBIM
- 1987 - 1995 Mr May
- before 1995–2009 Mr. A E Pedder BSc, MA
- 2009–2012 Mrs L E Heath BEd (Hons)
- 2013–2015 Mrs M Strong B A (Hons)

== Head Boys / Girls ==
- 1971-1972 John Scott / Sue Tallack

== Chairmen of the School Governors' Committee ==
- –2009 Col A R Singer
- 2006–2009 Col P A Smith OBE
- 2010–2013 Col P H Eaton MA (Cantab)
- 2013–2015 Col A Reynolds

== Emblem ==
The school emblem was a wild boar, an animal typical of the Lüneburg Heath region in which the school was located.
