= British occupation zone in Germany =

Allied-occupied area in Germany (1945–1949)

British occupation zone in Germany Britische Besatzungszone
- Military occupation zone of the British part of Allied-occupied Germany
- 1945–1949
- Flag Badge

- Post-Nazi German occupation borders and territories from 1945 to 1949. British occupation zone (green). The grey areas within the British sector are the two American exclaves of Bremen and Bremerhaven.

Anthem
- "God Save the King"
- Capital: Bad Oeynhausen
- Government
- Military governor
  - 1945–1946 (first): Bernard Montgomery
  - 1947–1949 (last): Brian Hubert Robertson
- Chief Director
  - 1947–1949: Hermann Pünder
- Historical era: Cold War
  - German surrender: 8 May 1945
  - Allied Control Council: 5 July 1945
  - Disestablished: 7 October 1949
  - Final Settlement^{c}: 12 September 1990
Preceded by	Succeeded by
Nazi Germany	West Germany
- Today part of: Germany
- a. Joined the Federal Republic of Germany (West Germany) on 1 January 1957.; b. Reunited Germany by joining the Federal Republic of Germany on 3 October 1990.; c. German reunification took place on 3 October 1990.; d.The western Allied zones of Germany and the western sectors of Berlin.

The British occupation zone in Germany (German: Britische Besatzungszone) was one of the Allied-occupied areas in Germany after World War II. The United Kingdom – also representing the other Commonwealth countries – was one of the three major Allied powers that defeated Nazi Germany. By 1945, the Allies had divided the country into four occupation zones: British, Soviet, American and French. These lasted until 1949, when the new country of West Germany was established. Out of all the four zones, the British had the largest population and contained within it the heavy industry region, the Ruhr, as well as the naval ports and the majority of Germany's coastlines.

== Background ==
By the end of 1942, Britain was already thinking about post-war strategy, and in particular the occupation of Germany. This became more of a reality when the British Liberation Army, consisting largely of the 21st Army Group, landed in Normandy on 6 June 1944. Having fought all the way through Northern France and the Low Countries, they had reached the German borders by the end of the year.

The "Big Three" (Winston Churchill, Franklin D. Roosevelt and Joseph Stalin) met at the Yalta Conference between 4 and 11 February 1945 to discuss Germany's post-war occupation, which included coming to a final determination of the inter-zonal borders. The three powers divided "Germany as a whole" into four occupation zones, each to be controlled by one Allied power: the United Kingdom, the United States, the Soviet Union or France. This division was ratified at the August 1945 Potsdam Conference, setting aside an earlier division into three zones (excluding France) proposed by the September 1944 London Protocol. Stalin agreed that France would have a fourth occupation zone in Germany and this was formed from parts of the American and the British zones.

In the final offensive the First Canadian Army wheeled left and liberated the northern part of the Netherlands and captured adjoining areas of Germany, and the British Second Army swept into and occupied much of north-west Germany. The liberation of the concentration camps such as Bergen Belsen moved the strategy of post-war Germany into a new direction; thus denazification was put at the forefront of British post-war policy in Germany.

On 4 May 1945, Field Marshal Bernard Montgomery accepted the unconditional surrender of the German forces in the Netherlands, in north west Germany and Denmark. This was followed by the German Instrument of Surrender three days later.

To form the French zone the Americans ceded land south of Baden-Baden, land south of the Free People's State of Württemberg (which became Württemberg-Hohenzollern), the Lindau region on Lake Constance, and four regions in Hesse east of the Rhine. The British ceded the Saarland, the Palatinate, and territories on the left bank of the Rhine as far as Remagen (including Trier, Koblenz, and Montabaur). Also created was the Inner German Border: the boundary between the Western and Soviet occupation zones.

== Occupation ==
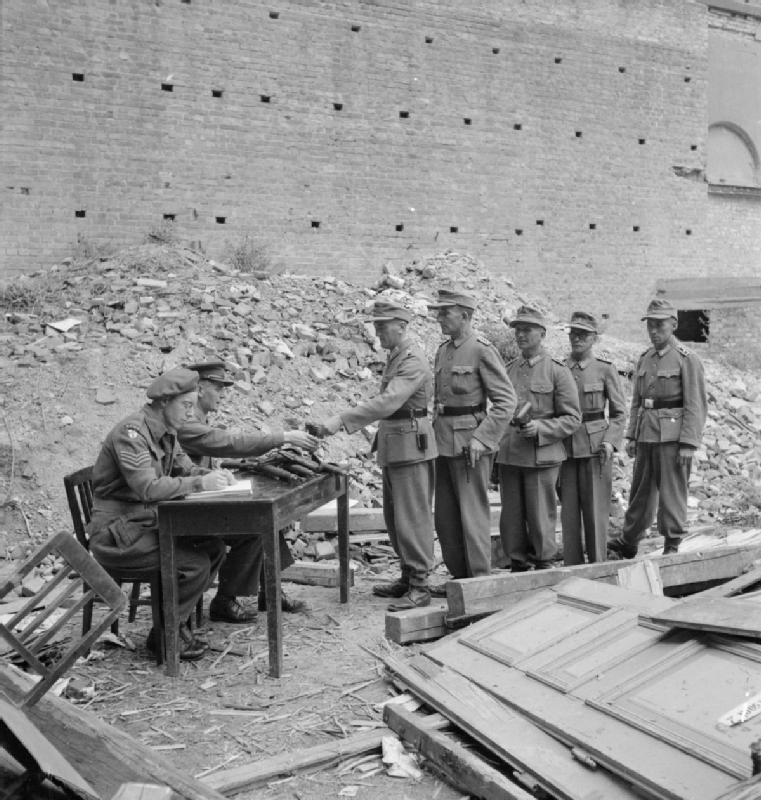
German policemen are disarmed shortly after the entry of British forces into Hanover in 1945

As soon as the surrender of Germany had been announced British forces executed "Operation Eclipse": the disarmament of the German armed forces and the occupation, rehabilitation and de-nazification of Germany. Britain was responsible for north-west Germany, the Ruhr, the Netherlands and Denmark.

At the end of July 1945, Field Marshal Bernard Montgomery was made military governor of the British occupation zone, with Brian Robertson as Chief of Staff and Montgomery's deputy. Both were also on the Allied Control Council. The British Army of the Rhine (BAOR) was formed on 25 August 1945 with the headquarters in Bad Oeynhausen and Field Marshal Sir Gerald Templer serving as Director of Military Government. BAOR was made responsible for the occupation and administration of the British Zone. They requisitioned German buildings for military administration and accommodation. Some 800,000 soldiers from BAOR were in Germany by the end of 1945, and new barracks had to be built due to the intense damage done to German cities during the war, particularly Hamburg.

The Canadians had a temporary occupation force (CAOF) peaking at 853 officers and 16,983 other ranks. The Canadian government only made them available during the period of adjustment and disarmament following the occupation of Germany. By mid July 1946 most of the Canadians had left for home.

A number of departments were set up for various purposes. The Property Control Department took over Nazi-controlled buildings and properties including looted works of art and other valuables. These objects were held for safekeeping until returned in due course to their rightful owners, most from outside of Germany. There was also the Public Safety Department, who seized all kinds of rifles and revolvers from German troops and civilians. A law was passed forbidding German civilians possessing arms of any kind.

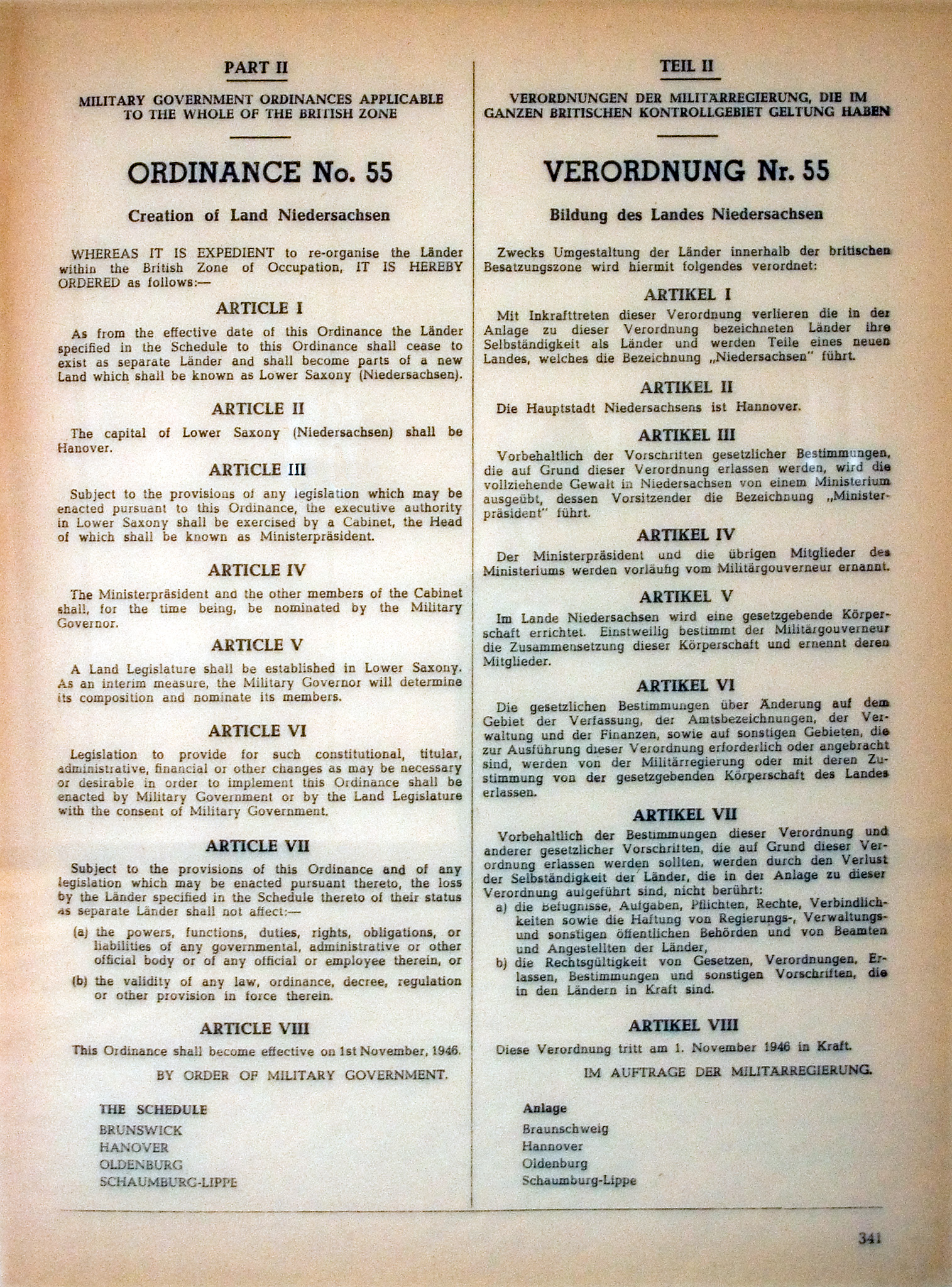
Copy of the Ordinance No. 55, with which on 22 November 1946 the British military government founded the state of Lower Saxony retroactively to 1 November

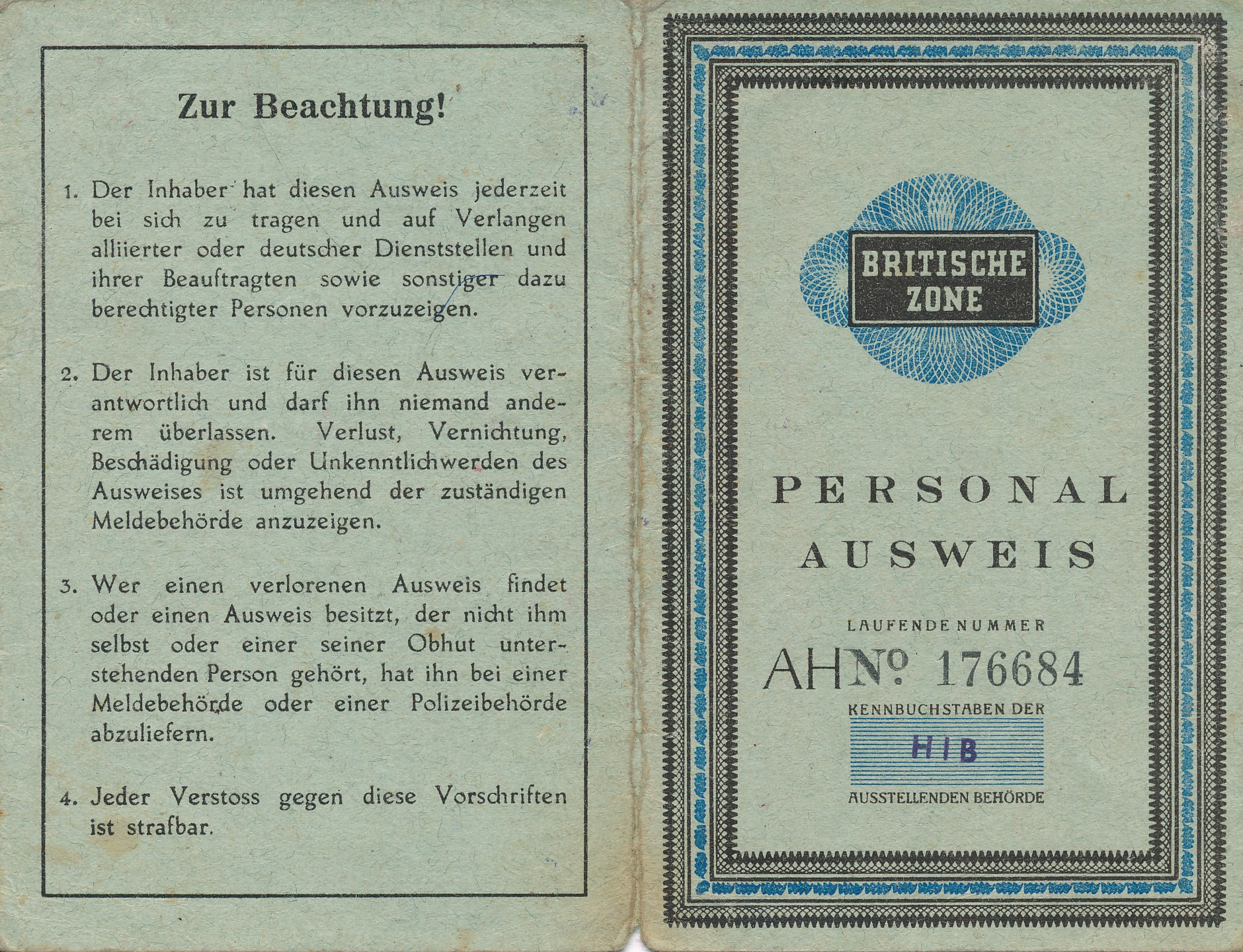
Identity document of the British occupation zone

The RAF were also part of the occupation and were renamed British Air Forces of Occupation (BAFO) on 15 July 1945. The Malcolm Clubs were set up for RAF personnel in towns and villages across the zone. Two years later however, the BAFO had shrunk to ten squadrons at three airfields, all directly under control of the Air Headquarters at Bad Eilsen.

The Control Commission for Germany (CCG/BE) was set up consisting of British civil servants as well as military personnel. It took over aspects of local government, housing, transport and (through its new Special Police Corps, also known as the British Civil Police or the Public Safety Branch) policing. The CCG/BE re-established the city of Hamburg as a German state but with borders that had been drawn by the Nazi government in 1937. George Ayscough Armytage and Governor Henry V. Berry identified with the city and worked through indirect rule, asking prospective Hamburg inhabitants to resume office in the administration. The British also created three new German states in Ordinance No. 46:

- Schleswig-Holstein – emerging in 1946 from the Prussian Province of Schleswig-Holstein;
- Lower Saxony – the merger of Brunswick, Oldenburg, and Schaumburg-Lippe with the state of Hanover in 1946; and
- North Rhine-Westphalia – the merger of Lippe with the Prussian provinces of the Rhineland (northern part) and Westphalia – during 1946–47.

In March 1946 the British zonal advisory board (Zonenbeirat) was established, with representatives of the states, the central offices, political parties, trade unions, and consumer organisations. As indicated by its name, the zonal advisory board had no legislative power, but was merely advisory. The Control Commission for Germany – British Element made all decisions with its legislative power.

In 1947, the American Zone of Occupation, being landlocked, had no port facilities – thus the Free Hanseatic City of Bremen and Bremerhaven became exclaves within the British Zone.

Military governors

- 22 May 1945 – 30 April 1946: Bernard Montgomery
- 1 May 1946 – 31 October 1947: William Sholto Douglas
- 1 November 1947 – 21 September 1949: Brian Hubert Robertson

=== Displaced persons, refugees and POWs ===
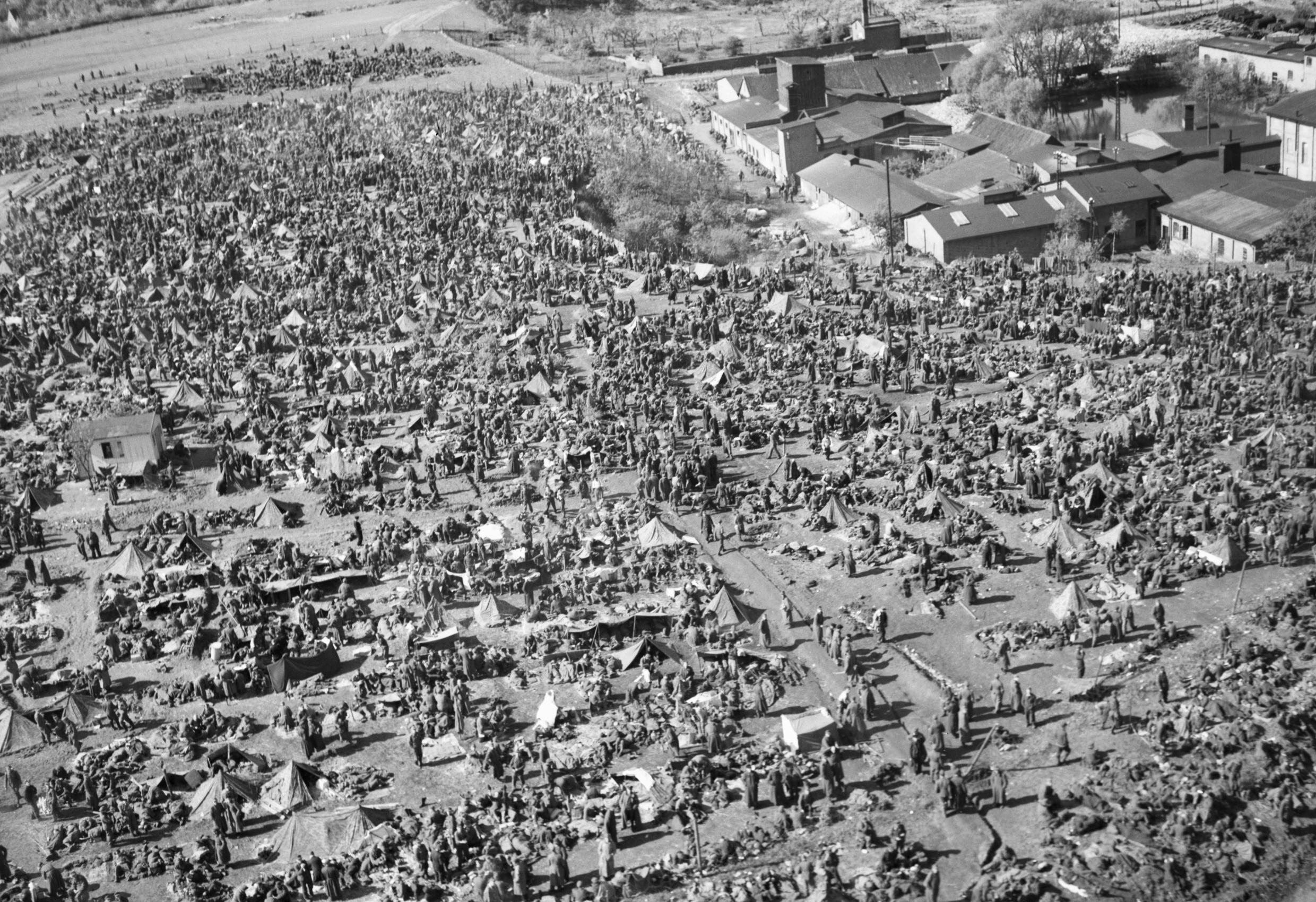
Aerial view of the prisoner of war compound at Hamburg packed with surrendered German troops

By 22 June 1945, of the 7,614,914 prisoners (of all designations) held in British and American camps, 4,209,000 were soldiers captured before the German capitulation and who were therefore considered "POWs". The rest were classed as Disarmed Enemy Forces by the Americans and Surrendered Enemy Personnel by the British. According to Allied agreements, these were supposed to be split between Britain and the United States. The British in their zone were in possession of just over 2,000,000 German POWs, but were unable to handle this many – feeding, housing and looking after them became a logistical nightmare. The British had no choice but to renegotiate with the Americans on their split. The British reported that they did not have places to keep them or men to guard them on the continent. In addition it was thought that moving them to England would arouse public resentment and adversely affect morale.

Another problem the British faced was that they had the largest population of the four allied powers. This was exacerbated by the great number of German refugees who had come by sea fleeing the Soviets, as well as forced expulsion from Eastern Europe. German POWs from abroad also arrived by sea in their thousands, thus making the accommodation shortage even worse and also caused a reduction in the food ration in early 1946. Over the next year, however, many refugees obtained accommodation and work as the economy recovered – the vast majority were granted German citizenship. In addition to this the British had to deal with tens of thousands of displaced persons. Many of these were from Eastern European nations occupied by the Soviets, and as such many refused to go back. The British initially used them as watchman and labour units, but set up the Mixed Service Organisation, using these displaced persons as drivers, clerks, mechanics and guards. Another organisation was needed to control the flow of refugees and prevent smuggling. In 1946 the Frontier Control Service was set up, which was a civilian frontier force administered by the British Control Commission.

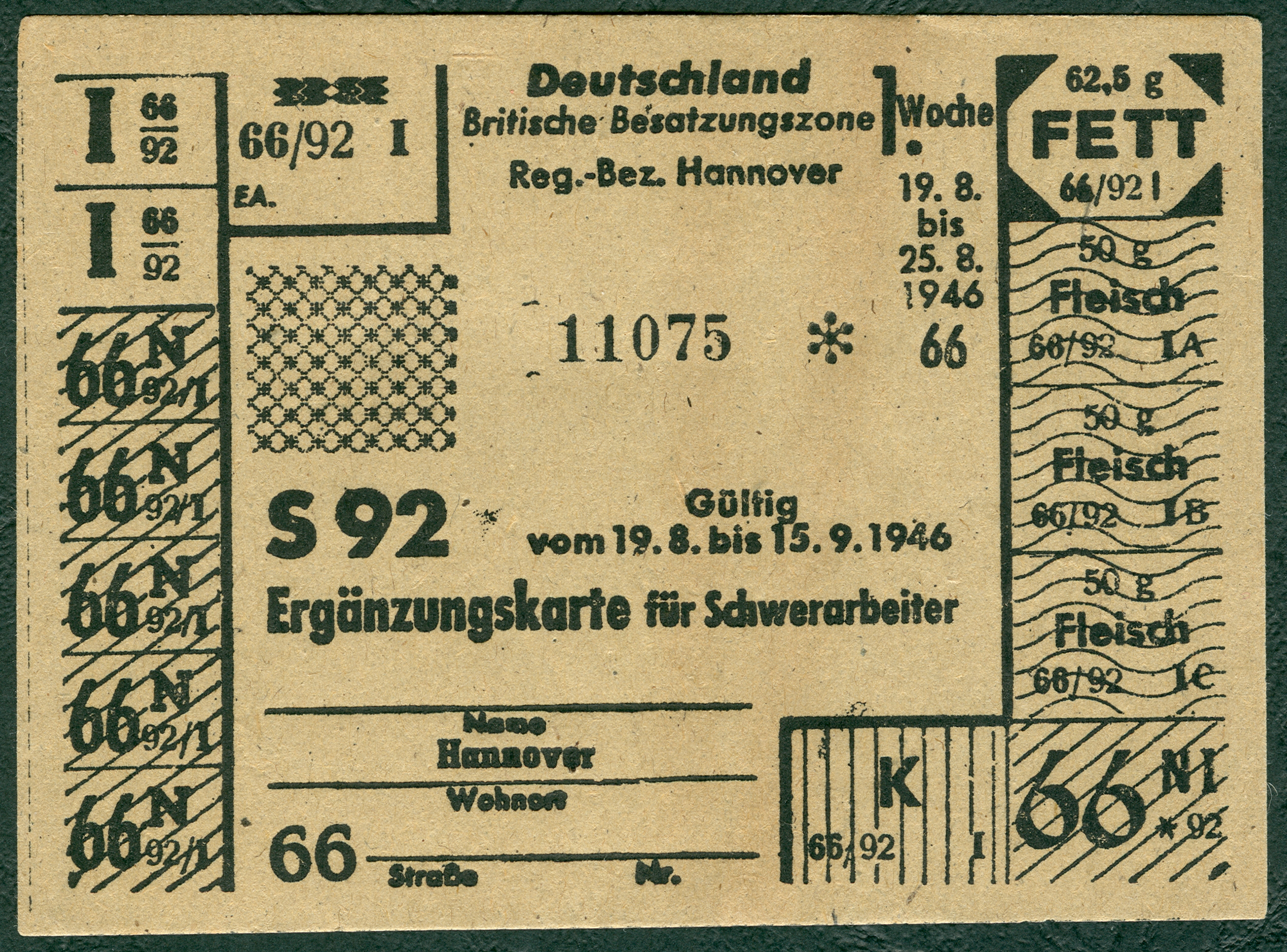
Supplementary food card for industry workers in the British zone of occupation district of Hanover

Many German POWs were formed into Civilian Labour units – they still had the status of Surrendered Enemy Personnel but they were used where help was needed such as unloading supplies. The German Civil Labour Organisation (GCLO) was set up on 1 August 1947, after the Labour Service units were broken up. The Germans were given the choice of either joining the GCLO or being sent to a prisoner-of-war camp until they were released into civilian life. By late 1947, over 50,000 Germans were employed and organized in units that were attached to parts of the British Army or the RAF as labourers, drivers, mechanics and in many other roles. They had a staff of between 220 and 475 men. Although the GCLO was considered a civil organisation, its members wore a kind of uniform and were incorporated into a structure that conformed to military principles. After numerous former members of the Wehrmacht had left the GCLO over time, new members were hired by the British and it used its right to forcibly recruit staff if necessary. Most German captives were released by the end of 1948. The GCLO was transferred to the German Service Organisation (GSO) on 21 October 1950.

In January 1945, the basic German ration was 1,625 calories/day, and that was further reduced to 1,100 calories by the end of the war in the British zone. This remained at that level into the summer, with levels varying from 840 calories/day in the Ruhr to 1,340 calories/day in Hamburg. The German population was existing on rations that would not sustain life in the long term. In order to avert starvation in Germany, the Lord President of the Council, Herbert Morrison, negotiated a deal with the Americans whereby 675,000 long tons (686,000 t) of grain was shipped to Germany in return for a reduction of 200,000 long tons (200,000 t) in shipments to Britain.

The British also had to deal with active resistance groups known as Werwolfs. Violence however failed to mobilize a spirit of popular national resistance, largely due to war-weariness of the populace, and as a result Werwolf attacks were low and relatively few reprisals took place in the British zone.

At the end of October 1946, the British Zone had a population of:

North Rhine-Westphalia	11.7 million
Lower Saxony	6.2 million
Schleswig-Holstein	2.6 million
Hamburg	1.4 million

=== Denazification ===
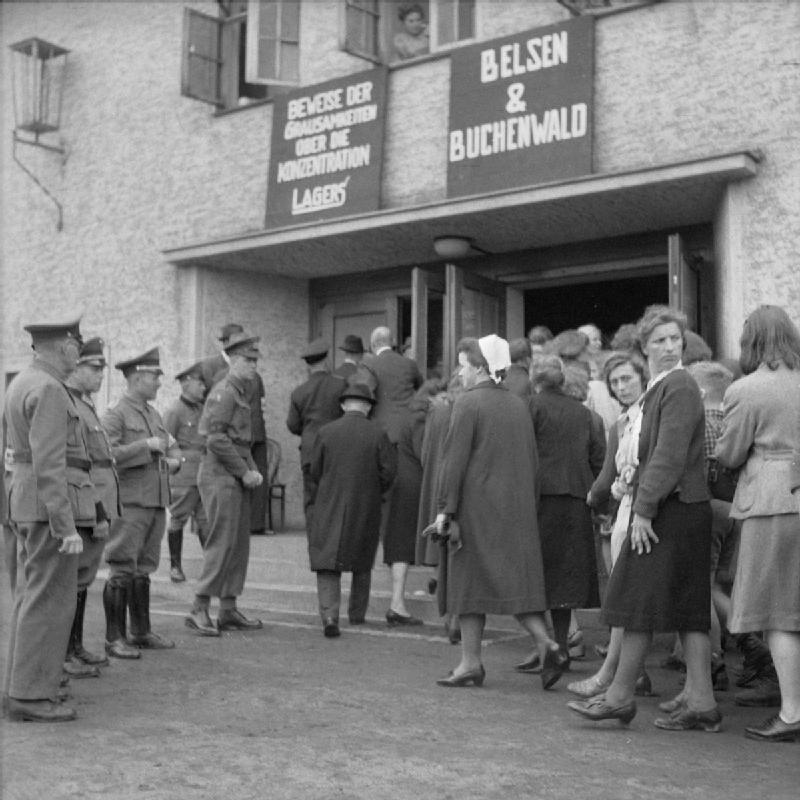
British Military and German civilian police watch inhabitants of Burgsteinfurt enter the cinema to watch a film showing scenes from the concentration camps at Belsen and Buchenwald

Shortly after the German surrender, the Allied armies were on the hunt for notorious German war criminals, generals and high-ranking members of the Nazi Party. The British had already prepared a plan from 1942 onwards, assigning a number of civil servants to head the administration of liberated territory with extensive powers to remove from their post, in both public and private domains, anyone suspected, usually on behavioural grounds, of harbouring Nazi sympathies.

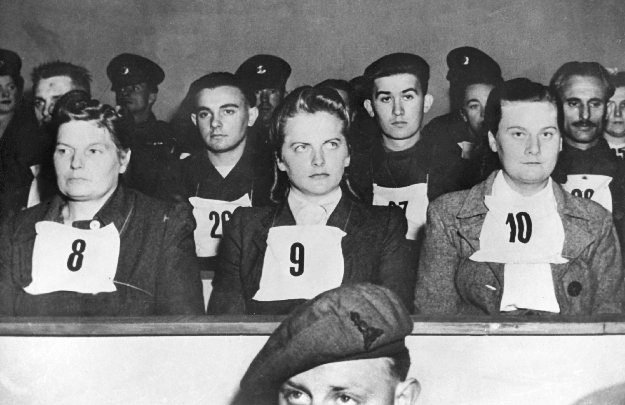
Former female Nazi camp commandants, including Irma Grese (number 9) during the Belsen Trial

During the early months of occupation, the British were at the forefront of bringing to justice anyone, both soldiers and civilians, who had committed war crimes against POWs or captured Allied aircrew. One of the most infamous was Heinrich Himmler – he was arrested at a British checkpoint in disguise and was taken to the headquarters of the Second British Army in Lüneburg on 23 May 1945 for interrogation. Whilst being examined by a doctor, Himmler committed suicide with a concealed cyanide pill. The British established their own War Crimes Investigation Teams also known as WCIT. Trials took place within the British occupation zone, the most notorious being the Belsen trial following the liberation of Bergen-Belsen concentration camp in April 1945. Taken to trial were 45 former SS men, women and kapos. Eleven were sentenced to death and hanged, including Commandant Josef Kramer and Irma Grese on 13 December 1945. There was also the Hamburg Ravensbrück Trials – several in all that were held at the Curio house in the Rotherbaum quarter of Hamburg, lasting two years. Executions relating to these trials were carried out on the gallows at Hamelin prison by renowned hangman Albert Pierrepoint. Between December 1948 and October 1949 he executed 226 people, often over ten over a day, and on several occasions groups of up to seventeen over two days.

Between November 1945 and October 1946, the Nuremberg trials also took place, this being an 'International Military Tribunal' in the American zone of occupation but with all four allied powers being involved. Judge Geoffrey Lawrence was President of the Judicial group.

An interrogation was set up at Bad Nenndorf by the Combined Services Detailed Interrogation Centre (CSDIC) – it was notorious for its alleged mistreatment of detainees, allegedly involving torture using buckets of cold water, beatings, and burns with lit cigarettes. A public scandal ensued, with the centre eventually being closed down. Other smaller trials continued, but by 1948 these became few and far between as the political situation with the Soviet Union deteriorated. By this time also, the British government wanted the rebuilding of the German economy to take precedence over the imprisonment of Nazi criminals. By 1948 WCIT had brought around 350 cases to trial involving over 1,000 accused Nazis. Of these, 667 were imprisoned and 230 sentenced to death. In October 1945, in order to constitute a working legal system, and given that 90% of German lawyers had been members of the Nazi Party, the British decided that 50% of the German Legal Civil Service could be staffed by "nominal" Nazis. Similar pressures caused them to relax the restriction even further in April 1946. The following year the British handed over all their denazification panels to the Germans.

Controversy came to a head when in the summer of 1947 American war crimes prosecutors presented the British government with 'overwhelming' evidence that four German officers held in British custody, Erich von Manstein, Walther von Brauchitsch, Gerd von Rundstedt and Adolf Strauss were complicit in war crimes. The Soviets also requested their extradition of Manstein and Runstedt early the following year. This led, in early July, to a Cabinet agreement on bringing these officers to trial, and all were transferred from Island Farm (also known as Special Camp 11) in Bridgend, Wales, to Munsterlager to await trial. Tensions had also mounted between the War Office and Foreign Office over the morality and political desirability of British war crimes trials. This resulted in a decision to call a halt to all other outstanding war crimes proceedings by 1 September 1948. Brauchitsch died that October and Rundstedt and Strauss were released on medical grounds in March 1949. Manstein did have prominent British support such as author B. H. Liddell Hart and Labour politician Reginald Paget. Manstein's trial was held in Hamburg from 23 August to 19 December 1949 – the last trial the British would make against Nazis during the occupation. Manstein was found guilty and sentenced to eighteen years prison, however this was reduced to twelve years on medical grounds.

=== Disarmament ===
British forces had to dispose of numerous German war material: many aircraft, tanks, ships, and submarines and a huge amount of ordnance had to be destroyed.

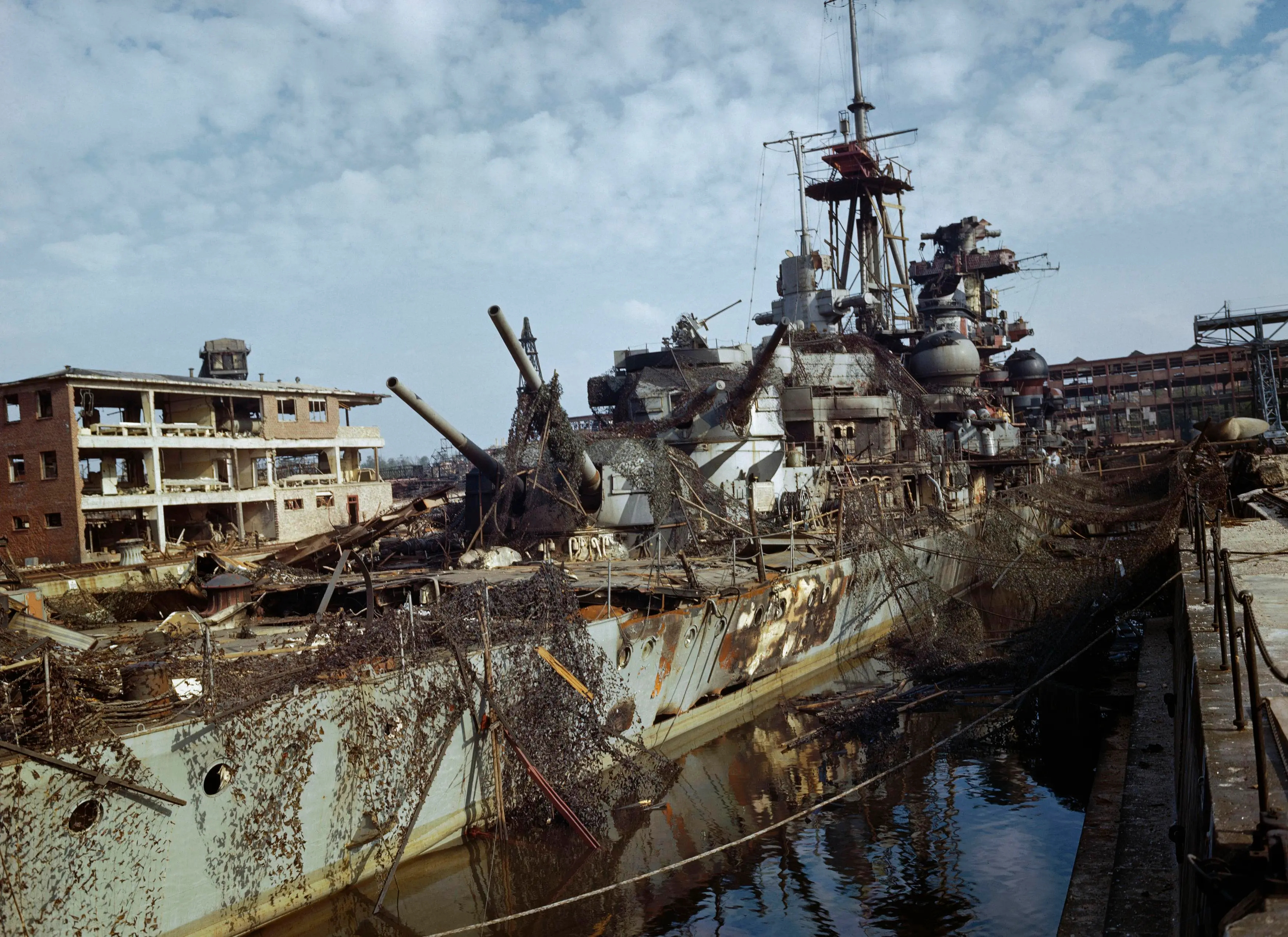
The cruiser Admiral Hipper in dry dock at Kiel, severely damaged by RAF Bomber command; it was later raised and then scrapped.

The Royal Air Force disarmament wing blew up tons of ordnance and scrapped hundreds of German aircraft. In addition captured tanks, arms, vehicles were all scrapped unless they were of any use for evaluation. The British army took control of many factories; one of these was the Maschinenfabrik Niedersachsen in Hanover with two plants at Laatzen and the other Linden. Here, a group of tanks including incomplete Jagdpanther and Panther Tanks that were built under British supervision, namely the Royal Electrical and Mechanical Engineers. In 1946/1947 the Linden plant was dismantled, and its dismantled parts sent back to the UK, while the Laatzen plant was in use by the British until 1957.

The Royal Navy seized the majority of the harboured German naval fleet: mainly in Kiel. The U-Boats were disposed of during Operation Deadlight: the Royal Navy towed the submarines to three areas about 100 miles (160 km) north-west of Ireland to sink them. A number of Germany's capital ships were seized: on 27 May 1945, the German cruiser Prinz Eugen and the light cruiser Nürnberg—the only major German naval vessels to survive the war in serviceable condition—were escorted by the British cruisers Dido and Devonshire to Wilhelmshaven. In July German cruiser Admiral Hipper which had been severely damaged by RAF Bomber Command and then scuttled in port was raised and towed to Heikendorfer Bay and subsequently broken up for scrap between 1948 and 1952. Other severely damaged cruisers Leipzig and Emden met the same fate, while the capsized German cruiser Admiral Scheer was partially broken up for scrap.

The German island of Heligoland in the North Sea fell within the British zone and had contained a large U-Boat base. On 18 April 1947, in an attempt to destroy the base and remove it as a fleet base location for Germany, the Royal Navy detonated 6,700 tonnes of explosives. Known as "Operation Big Bang" or "British Bang", this resulted in one of the biggest single non-nuclear detonations in history. The blow shook the main island several miles down to its base, changing its shape; and as a result an area known as the 'Mittelland' was created.

As well as disarmament there was much to find in the way of war booty and intelligence. With the completion of the T-Force and the Alsos missions which had gathered intelligence and booty in the fighting, all these were turned over to the US Field Information Agency, Technical (FIAT). FIAT was authorized to "coordinate, integrate, and direct the activities of the various missions and agencies" interested in scientific and technical intelligence but prohibited from collecting and exploiting such information on its own responsibility. As a result, the British set up a number of new post-war operations within their zone: the Fedden Mission was set up to exploit German aeronautics and deny German technical skills to the Soviet Union. The mission was sent by the Ministry of Aircraft Production to gather technical intelligence about German aircraft and aero-engines. Operation Surgeon was also created: a list of 1,500 German scientists and technicians was drawn up, with the goal of forcibly removing them from Germany to lessen the risk of their falling into Soviet hands. The German scientists and technicians were, in general, very co-operative with the British interviewers, with some wishing to emigrate to the U.S. or Canada. Of the scientists relocated from 1946-1947, 100 chose to work for the UK.

The British had enough material to conduct launches of V-2 rockets and set up Operation Backfire. The operation was carried out during October 1945 from a launch pad near Arensch in order to demonstrate the weapon. The handling and launch procedures were operated by German personnel (many of whom were "lent" by the Americans), as they were the only ones who knew the procedures. The British treatment of the German soldiers, who included enlisted men, technicians, and officers, was generous. Four rockets were launched including one on 17 October 1945 that reached an altitude of about 80 kilometres (50 mi). On 23 December 1946, a study group of the British Interplanetary Society submitted a redesign of the V-2 rocket to the British Ministry of Supply but the proposal was never adopted.

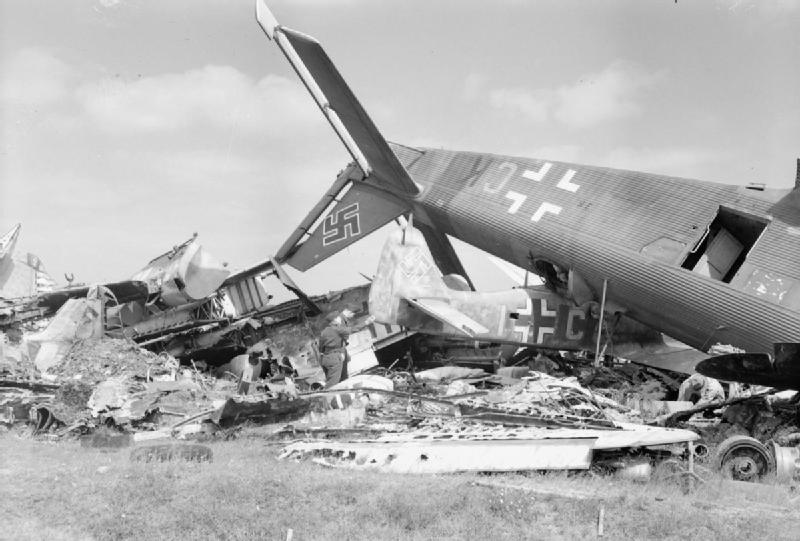
Two members of a Royal Air Force Disarmament Wing check an aircraft wreckage dump at Flensburg airfield

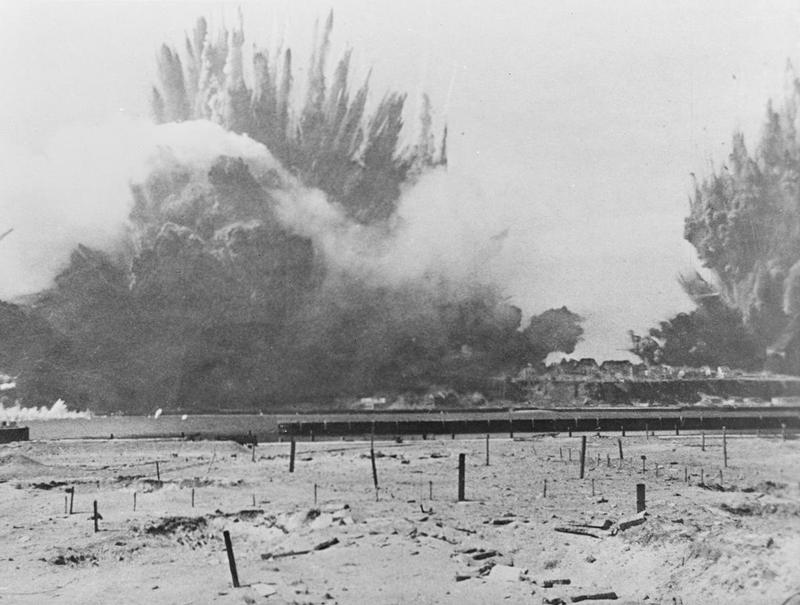
A still taken from the 'Destruction of Heligoland Defenses' on 18 April 1947 - an Admiralty documentary film processed for scientific purposes. This was one of the largest artificial non-nuclear explosions

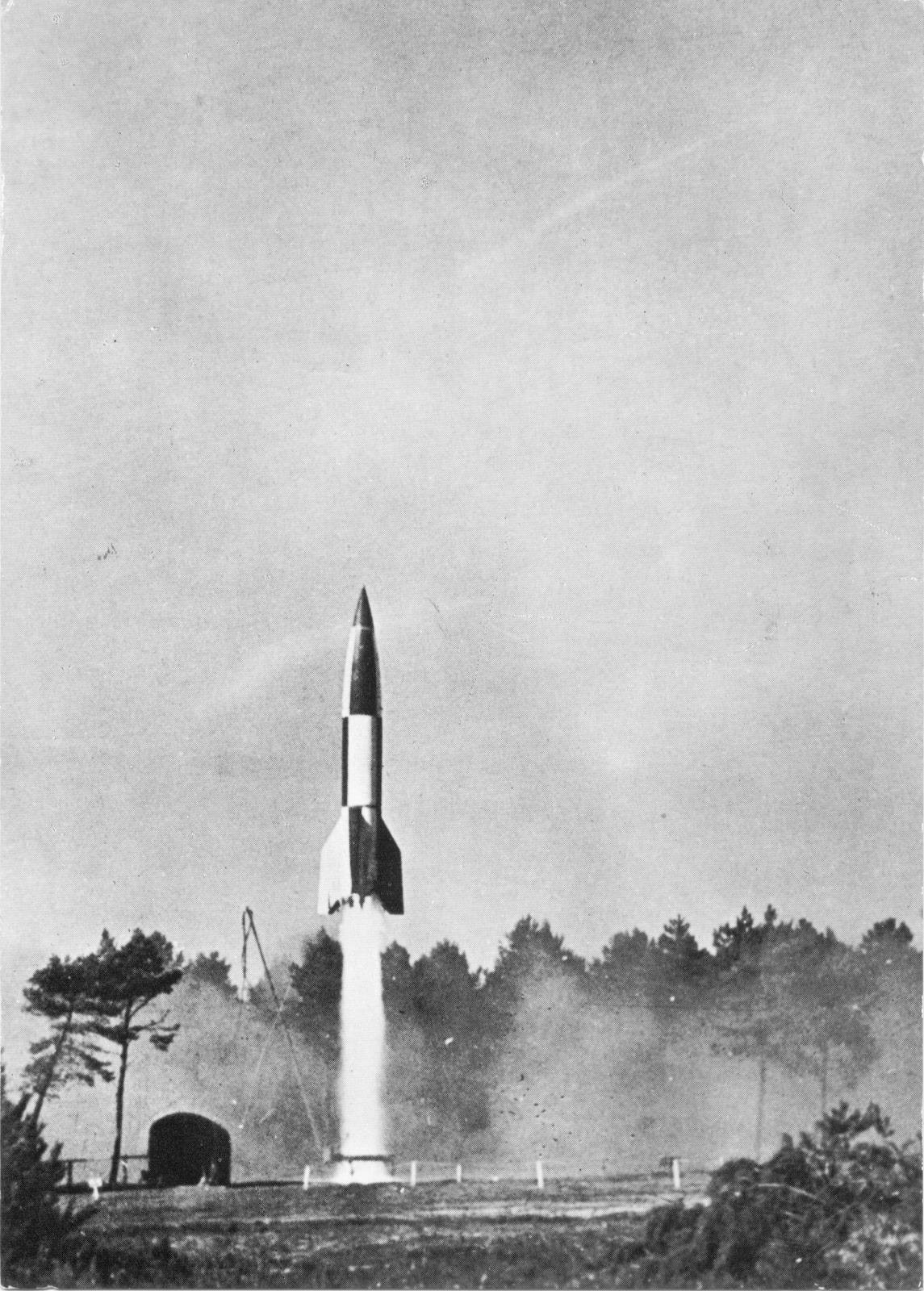
A German V-2 rocket fired by the British from a launch pad near Cuxhaven, during Operation Backfire in 1945.

There was also the Target Intelligence Committee (TICOM) which was a secret project to find and seize German intelligence assets, particularly in the field of cryptology and signals intelligence. This was an Anglo-American project with the aim to seek out and capture the cryptologic secrets of Germany. The concept was for six teams of cryptologic experts, mainly drawn from the code-breaking center at Bletchley Park. They went to Germany just after the war had ended to capture the documents, technology and personnel of the various German signal intelligence organizations before these precious secrets could be destroyed, looted, or captured by the Soviets. The biggest discovery was the "Russian FISH", a set of German wide-band receivers used to intercept Soviet high-level radio Teletype signals. These were sent back to England, reconstructed, and tested at Steeple Claydon in Buckinghamshire; they soon encountered Russian radio traffic.

=== Agriculture and Industry ===
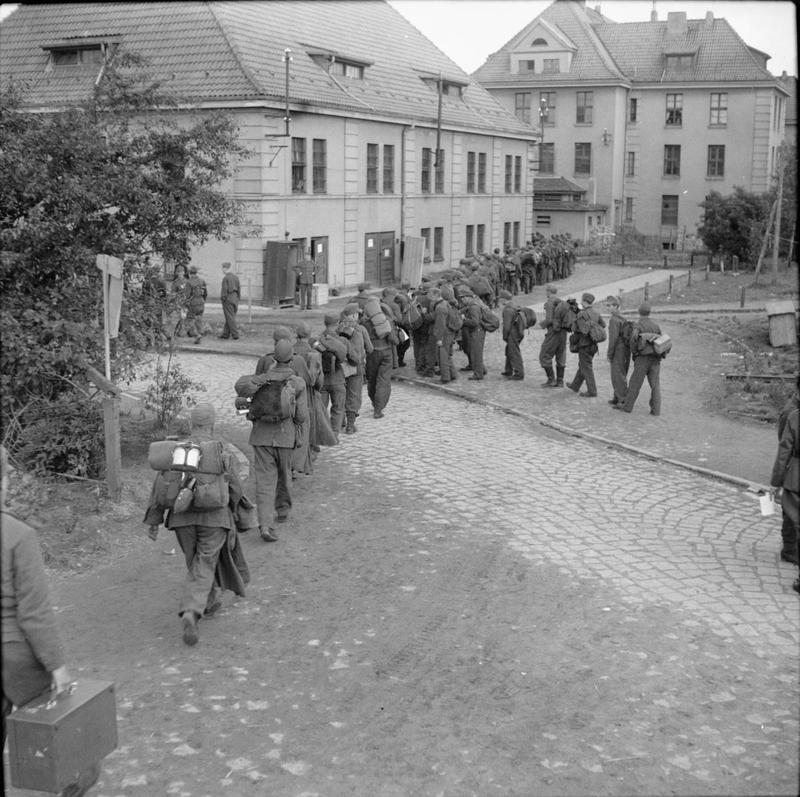
Demobbed German soldiers at Eutin barracks being taken to various locations to undertake agricultural work during Operation Barleycorn

Over 300,000 Germans (non-Nazi officers and men) were released from captivity by the British between June and September 1945 to work on the land and bring in the harvest, in a project named Operation Barleycorn. The project, masterminded by Major General Gerald Templer was successful, and as a result more prisoners were released for transport and mining.

Much of Germany's industrial plant fell within the British zone, especially the industrial power house, the Ruhr. There was a concern that rebuilding a former enemy's industrial powerhouse would eventually prove a danger to British security and compete with the weakened British economy. In January 1946 the Allied Control Council set the foundation of the future German economy by putting a cap on German steel production capacity. The British had argued for a less-limited reduction of twelve million tons of steel per year, but had to submit to the will of the US, France, and the Soviet Union (which had argued for a 3 million ton limit). Steel plants thus made redundant were to be dismantled by the allies - the resources being sent back to the respective country.

Coal production in the Ruhr accounted for 93% for all zones combined. The French in particular wanted to place the area under international control. The British however refused and had begun to pursue an anti-Soviet foreign policy which strongly influenced its occupational policy. The British thus feared Soviet influence in the Ruhr and were prepared to snub the French. Once this internationalisation had receded, British Foreign Secretary Ernest Bevin and US Secretary of State George C. Marshall agreed that the Ruhr's industries should be distributed to help the economy of war weary Europe.

In Essen the British set up its headquarters for the North German Coal Control at the Krupp Mansion at Villa Hügel. From there they organised the output and distribution from all the Ruhr coal fields. The Royal Engineers restored much of the transport infrastructure but labour shortage was a huge problem. In an effort to find more labour the British launched Operation Coal Scuttle during the autumn of 1945; where 30,000 former soldiers were released to work in the coal mines. Nevertheless this was far fewer than were needed to restore output to pre-war production levels. Severe shortages of labour and raw materials meant that production remained at very low levels throughout 1945 and 46, nevertheless the economy started to revive.

The destroyed German transportation infrastructure created additional logistical difficulties, with rail lines, bridges, canals and terminals left in ruins. The turnaround time for rail wagons was five times higher than the pre-war average. Only 1,000 of the 13,000 kilometres of track in the British zone were operable. Urban centres often had to be supplied with horse-drawn carriages and wheeled carts.

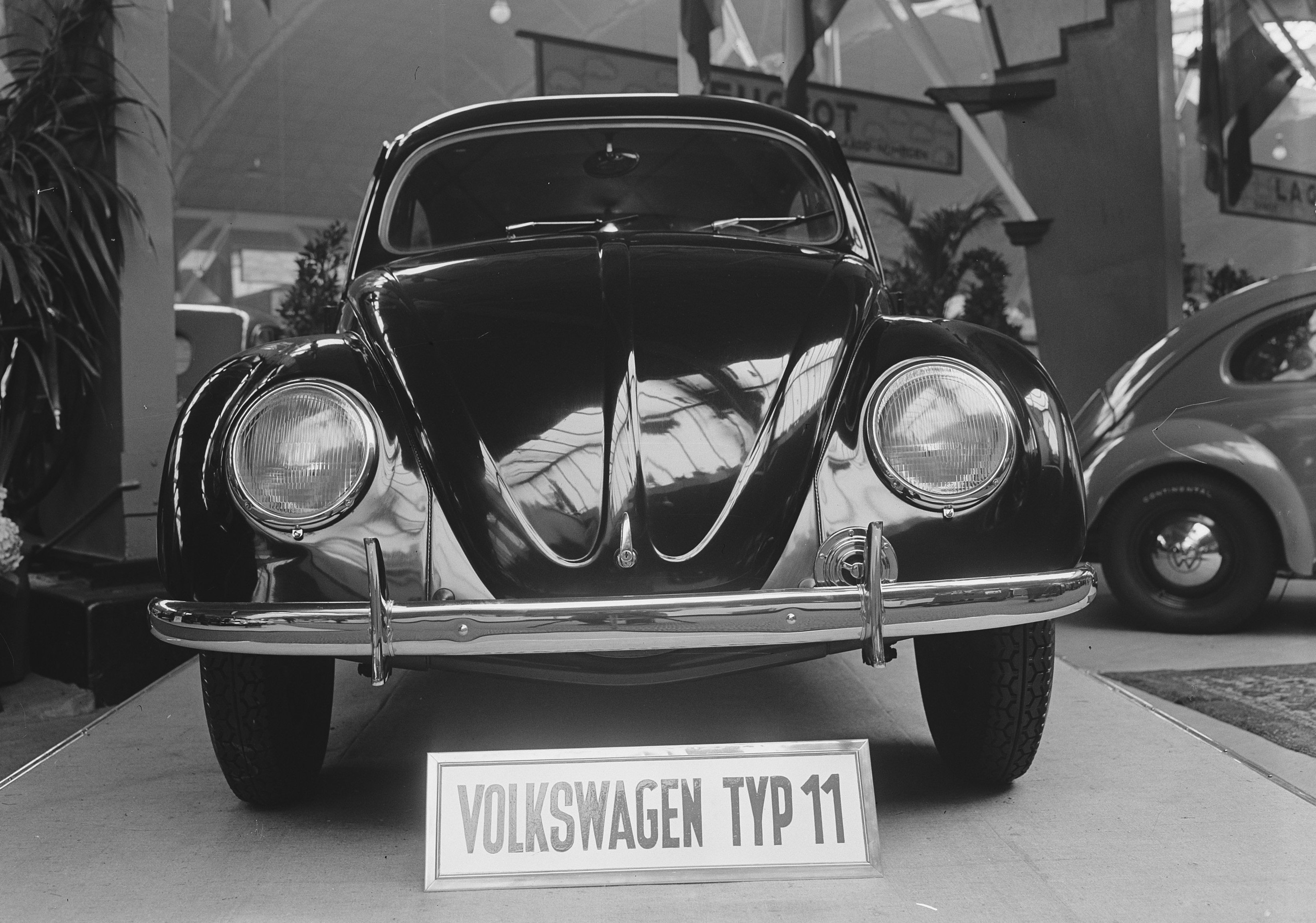
A Volkswagen Beetle at the 1948 Amsterdam International Autoshow - Volkswagen was revived under the direction of British army officer Major Ivan Hirst of the Royal Electrical and Mechanical Engineers (REME)

One of the many factories the British had taken over was the Volkswagen plant at Wolfsburg in June 1945. This was put under the overall direction of Colonel Michael McEvoy at Rhine Army Headquarters. A Royal Electrical and Mechanical Engineers (REME) officer Major Ivan Hirst revived the factory soon after, which had been badly damaged by allied air attacks. Hirst had the drains fixed, and bomb craters filled in; land in front of the factory was given over to food production. He discovered an intact Volkswagen Beetle within the factory from which he was able to present at headquarters. Hirst recognized that economical vehicle production would help in remedying the transport bottlenecks of the British Army. On 22 August he received an order to produce a vast number of Volkswagen Beetles for the British military administration. Cars were put together with old-stock and whatever could be found, many using parts from the Kübelwagen until 1946, when the factory produced about 1,000 cars a month. With the start of civilian series production by 27 December 1945, the Wolfsburg plant became the first automotive factory in Germany to resume production after the war. Aside from some remaining military production, civilian output reached almost 9,000 units in 1947, and for 1948 total production increased to 19,244 cars. Hirst also managed to establish a network for exports to the Netherlands. He carried on the supervision until Heinz Nordhoff was appointed director of the factory in 1949.

Other German businesses were assisted by the Army, including the KWS Grain Factory and the Huth-Apparatebau radio factory in Hanover. The latter employed locals to make radio sets manufactured primarily from components salvaged from German military equipment.

A solution by the British for the Germans to become self-sustaining industry was to build up a strong, free trade union movement in Germany. In early 1947 several unions joined to form the Gewerkschaftsbund in der britischen Besatzungszone. On 23–25 April the Deutscher Gewerkschaftsbund, DGB was founded in Bielefeld as a confederation of twelve unions. By 30 June 1949 the DGB within the British zone had some 2,885,036 members.

To solve the issue with the Ruhr, an Authority was set out in the communiqué issued 7 June 1948, after the London Six-Power Conference. The Authority would "supervise the production, organization, trade and ownership policies of the Ruhr industries and distribute their products so that all countries cooperating for the common economic good will have adequate access to them".

The Statute for the International Authority for the Ruhr (IAR) was signed and came into effect on 28 April 1949.

=== Media and sport ===
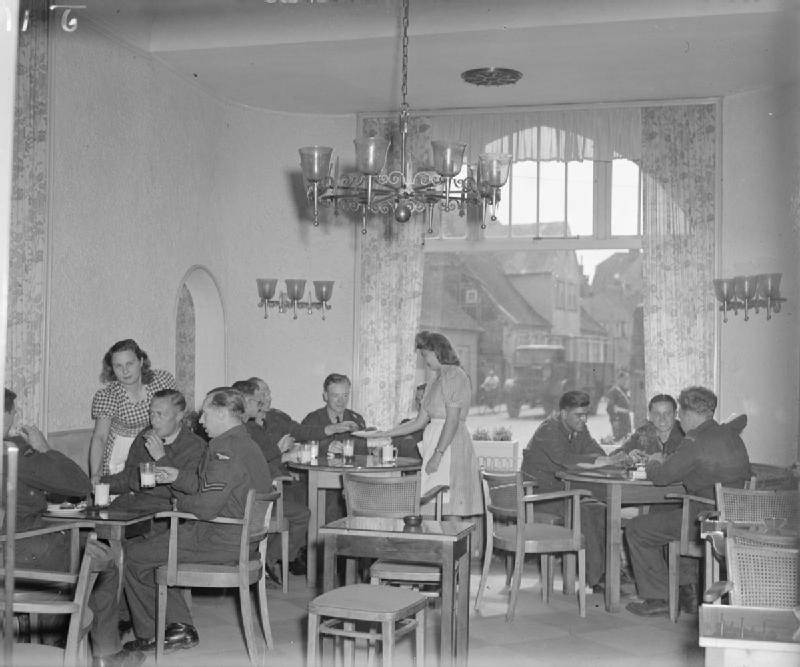
Airmen and non-commissioned officers (NCOs) in the canteen of the Royal Air Force's Malcolm Club in the former Hotel Stadt Hamburg in the town Schleswig in 1946.

In 1946 a short documentary film, A Defeated People, made by the Crown Film Unit and directed by Humphrey Jennings, depicting the shattered state of Germany after the war. The film was one of the first to show the consequences of the war for ordinary German civilians and showed what needed to be done – both by the British zone and the German people themselves to build a better Germany from the ruins.

A radio station was set up in Hamburg as the sole broadcasting station by British authorities to provide information to the population of the area. Hugh Carleton Greene, on secondment from the BBC was sent to create a public service broadcasting in their Zone. On 22 September 1945, Radio Hamburg became Nordwestdeutscher Rundfunk (NWDR) which was run as part by the REME.

In Hanover, Major John Seymour Chaloner who was assigned to the Public Relations and Information Services Control, a unit rebuilding the German media industry under the supervision of the Foreign and Commonwealth Office helped set up a magazine titled Diese Woche (meaning This Week in English), which had first been published in November 1946. Challoner worked with recently released German prisoner of war Rudolf Augstein and the magazine was later renamed Der Spiegel which was first published on 4 January 1947.

The British helped to revive association football in Germany. An attempt was made to stage a German football championship in 1947 but this failed. The 1947 British occupation zone football championship saw the best teams in the regional leagues compete against each other with Hamburger SV winning the final. Eventually an attempt to stage a German championship paid off from all four zones. A championship was staged with the best two clubs from the British zone championship who qualified for the tournament. In 1948 German football championship was created with 1. FC Nürnberg becoming champions.

=== Sub-zones ===
Belgian Sub-Zone of occupation

==== Belgium ====
Army units from other countries were stationed within the British occupation zone. The largest was the Belgian Sector allocated on 1 April 1946 to three Belgian infantry brigades of I Corps under the command of Lieutenant General Jean-Baptiste Piron. They controlled a 200-kilometre (120 mi)-strip from the Belgian-German border at the south of the British zone, and covered the cities of Aachen, Cologne, Soest, Siegen and Kassel. Corps headquarters moved to Haelen Caserne, Junkersdorf, Lindenthal, Cologne, in 1948.

==== Poland ====
Polish units which included 1st Armoured Division were stationed in the zone, in the northern area of the district of Emsland, as well as Oldenburg and Leer. The administrative centre was the city of Haren and was renamed Maczków (after divisional commander Stanisław Maczek) from 1945 to 1947. Polish units within the British Army were demobilised in June 1947 the last elements leaving the following year.

==== Norway ====
The Norwegian Brigade Group in Germany had 4,000 soldiers based in Hanover. It would later have headquarters in Oerlinghausen, Neumünster and Rendsburg.

==== Denmark ====
A Danish Brigade in Germany of 4000 men, under British command, was sent to occupy Oldenburg in the summer of 1947, after an agreement, signed at Copenhagen in April 1947, between Denmark and United Kingdom. A Danish Occupation Force was formally established on 7 October 1949. The headquarter was in the town of Jever in East Friesland. However, it was decided to move the brigade to Itzehoe in October 1949, naming itself as Tysklandsbrigaden. It remained stationed at Itzehoe, under the name of The Danish Command in Germany, until 1958.

==== Netherlands ====
The London conference of 23 April 1949, during the Six-Power Conference, gave the Netherlands some less far-reaching border modifications, after the failure of Bakker-Schut Plan. So, at 12 noon that day, Dutch troops moved to occupy an area of 69 km^{2} (17,000 acres), the most relevants parts were Elten (near Emmerich am Rhein) and Selfkant. Many other small border corrections were done, mostly in the vicinity of Arnhem and Dinxperlo, which also were part of this small sub-zone.

== Cold War ==
Under the Barber-Lyashchenko Agreement the CCG had to cede some areas of occupation to the Soviet Union – specifically the Amt Neuhaus of Hanover and some exclaves and fringes of Brunswick, for example the County of Blankenburg, and exchanged some villages between British Holstein and Soviet Mecklenburg's capital Schwerin. The redeployment was accomplished on 26 November, the respective occupational forces withdrew two days later to their new zonal territory. The British occupational forces provided evacuation to all the inhabitants of villages to be ceded to the Soviet zone.

=== BRIXMIS ===
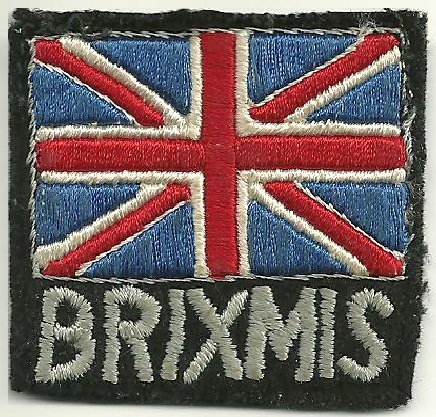
Flash worn on the upper arm by uniformed BRIXMIS personnel

In order to exchange military missions between the British and Soviet zones an agreement was further made on 16 September 1946 with the Robertson-Malinin Agreement. This led to the creation of the British Commanders'-in-Chief Mission to the Soviet Forces in Germany (BRIXMIS) and the Soviet equivalent in the British Zone, 'SOXMIS'. The idea was "to maintain Liaison between the Staff of the two Commanders-in-Chief and their Military Governments in the Zones". Subsequent agreements in 1947 led to the exchange of similar missions between the Soviet zone and those controlled by French and US forces, although the British–Soviet arrangement was significantly larger than either of the others. This liaison was undertaken by 31 members – 11 officers and no more than 20 others – appointed to each mission.

BRIXMIS maintained a permanent presence in its nominal home, the Mission House in Potsdam, but its actual headquarters and operational centre were in West Berlin. These were located in London Block, a part of the Olympic Stadium complex which housed the military government of the British Sector of Berlin. These liaison staff were issued passes allowing freedom of travel and circulation, with the exception of certain restricted areas, within each other's zone. Although never openly stated, this liaison role also presented an ideal opportunity for the gathering of military intelligence through reconnaissance and surveillance and the occasional theft of military matériel, from which both sides took an opportunity. The British Mission comprised members of the British Army, Royal Navy, and Royal Air Force who conducted uniformed liaison activities in marked cars and in two Chipmunk light aircraft.

=== Bizone to Trizone ===
Cooperation between the Western Allies and the Soviets ultimately broke down because of disagreements over Germany's political and economic future. On 1 January 1947 the British and Americans unified their zones to become known as the Bizone so as to better co-operate politically and economically. On 29 May 1947, the American and British military governments signed an agreement creating an Economic Council for the Bizone, to be based in Frankfurt am Main.

On 20 April 1947, the first Landtag elections were held in the British sector (except Hamburg, which had already held its city election on 13 October 1946). In Lower Saxony, Hinrich Wilhelm Kopf (SPD) formed an all-parties government (SPD, CDU, DP, FDP, KPD, DZP), in North Rhine-Westphalia Karl Arnold (CDU) formed a coalition with CDU, SPD, KPD and DZP (excluding FDP), and in Schleswig-Holstein SPD won a majority, so Hermann Lüdemann opted to govern alone.

The creation of the Bizone was the most significant factor in the creation of two blocs in Europe and therefore in the configuration of the Cold War international order. With the addition of the French occupation zone on 1 August 1948 the entity became the Trizone.

In March 1948, the Soviets withdrew from the Allied Control Council after learning of Allied proposals to create a new West German state and the seeds of the Cold War began. On 18 June the United States, Britain and France announced that on 21 June the Deutsche Mark would be introduced, but the Soviets refused to permit its use as legal tender in Berlin.

=== Berlin and the airlift ===
The British along with the three other allied powers also had a separate occupation zone within the capital Berlin, this despite being deep inside the Soviet occupation area. The British sector (165.5 km^{2}), consisted of the boroughs of Tiergarten, Charlottenburg, Wilmersdorf and Spandau. The Olympiastadion became the headquarters for the British occupiers. Spandau Prison was also located in the British sector but was operated by the Four-Power Authorities to house the Nazi war criminals sentenced to imprisonment at the Nuremberg Trials.

On 24 June, following increased tension and agitation, the Soviets blockaded Berlin. At the time, West Berlin had 36 days' worth of food, and 45 days' worth of coal. Militarily, the Americans and British were greatly outnumbered because of the postwar scaling back of their armies - the British forces numbered around 7,606. During the ensuing blockade the British with help from pilots from Canada, Australia, New Zealand and South Africa, conducted their airlift known as "Operation Plainfare". RAF Gatow was modernised with a 2,000 yards (1,800 m) long concrete runway, using 794 German workers. The airfield was key during the 'airlift' and also served the Berlin Infantry Brigade. The RAF would be relied on to increase its numbers quickly. It could fly additional aircraft in from Britain in a single hop, bringing the RAF fleet to about 150 Douglas Dakotas and 40 of the larger Avro Yorks with a 10-ton payload. The British ran a system, flying southeast from several airports in the Hamburg area through their second corridor into RAF Gatow and then also returning out on the center corridor, turning for home or landing at Hanover. They ran some round-trips, using their southeast corridor. To save time many flights didn't land in Berlin, instead air dropping material, such as coal, onto the airfields. Short Sunderland flying boats flying from Finkenwerder on the Elbe near Hamburg to the Havel river next to Gatow, their corrosion-resistant hulls were able to deliver baking powder and other salt into the city.

On 4 May 1949 the Soviets lifted the blockade, as they were unable to shoot down aircraft coming in as this would have led to war. Out of a total of 2,326,406 tons of supplies and food delivered the British contribution came to 541,937 tons. The cost was moderate: eight aircraft were lost in accidents and 40 personnel were killed.

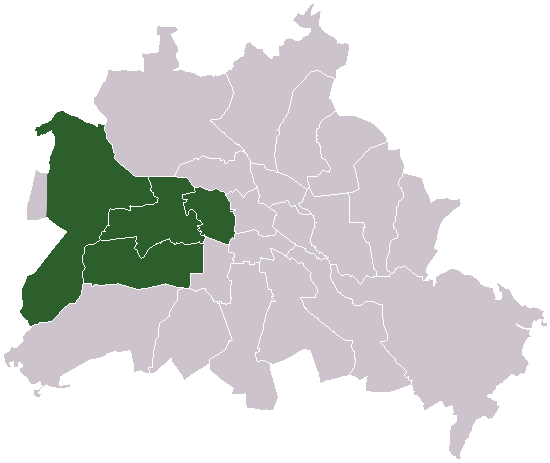
The British sector of Berlin

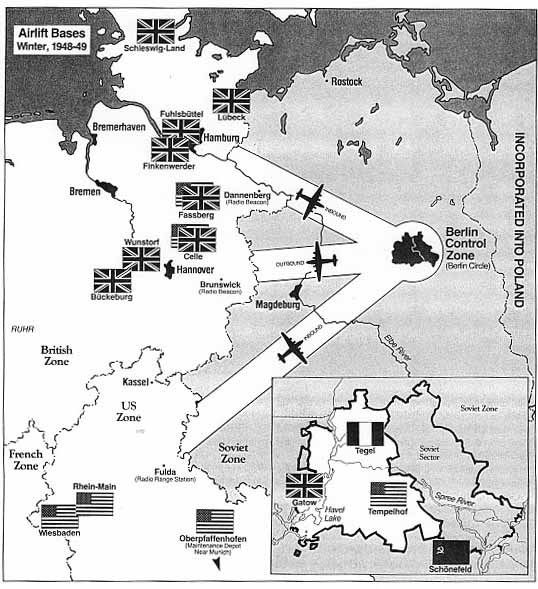
Allied airlift bases

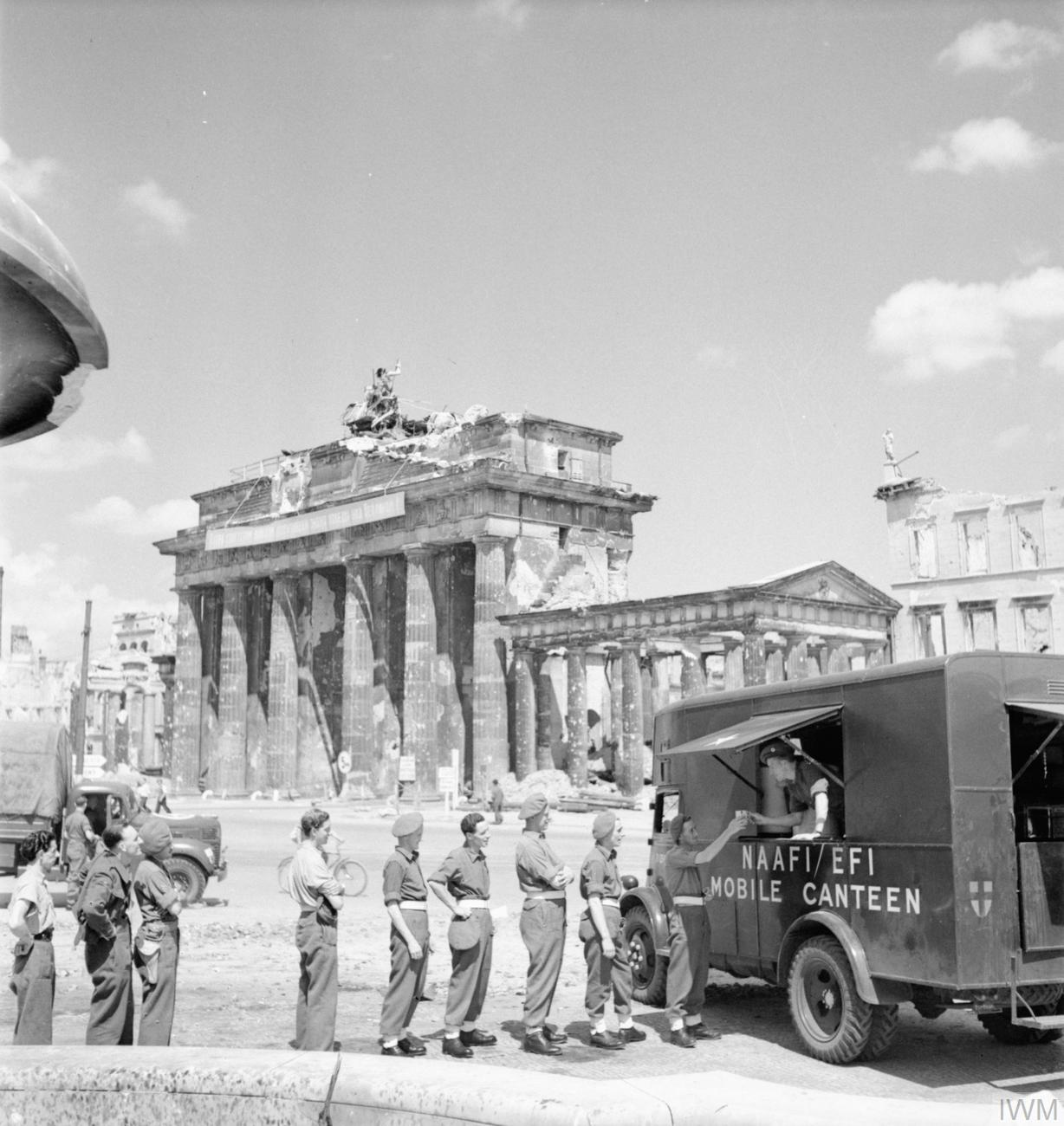
NAAFI Mobile Canteen No.750 beside the Brandenburg Gate 16 July 1945

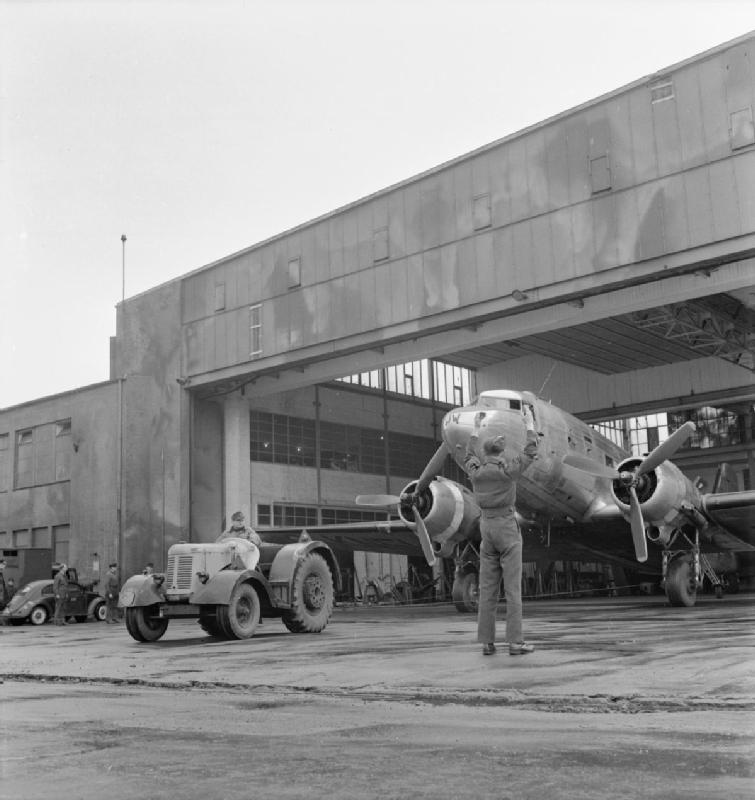
An RAF Douglas Dakota is towed out of a hangar at RAF Lubeck, after maintenance in April 1949 during the Berlin airlift

=== End of the occupation ===
On 10 April 1949, the Occupation statute was drawn up by American, British and French representatives. This specified the roles and responsibilities of the newly created government of the Federal Republic of Germany (West Germany) which gave them conditional sovereignty. Nevertheless, the allies retained the right to keep occupational forces and enact administrative duties in the country.

In July the Enclave of Bonn was created - as it was in the British zone the city was not under British or any other allied control - instead it was led by the Allied High Commission. In October, the Soviet zone was proclaimed the German Democratic Republic (GDR), under communist rule. In June the following year, Ivone Kirkpatrick became the British High Commissioner for Germany. Kirkpatrick carried immense responsibility, particularly with respect to the negotiation of the Bonn–Paris conventions during 1951–1952, which terminated the occupation and prepared the way for the rearmament of West Germany. This came into force on 5 May 1955.

High commissioners

- 21 September 1949 - 24 June 1950: Brian Hubert Robertson
- 24 June 1950 - 29 September 1953: Ivone Kirkpatrick
- 29 September 1953 - 5 May 1955: Frederick Hoyer-Millar

== Aftermath ==
For the ruling Labour Party of Britain, the occupation was generally regarded as a success. This was despite the considerable financial burden Britain was still experiencing with rationing and post-war austerity. Supporters argued that the occupation had contributed to the denazification and democratisation of Germany, while also helping to rebuild its political and economic institutions and to prepare the German population for self-government.

The occupation was not without its critics in the United Kingdom, and the British press frequently questioned both the purpose and the cost of maintaining an occupation force. Criticism came from across the political spectrum, although attitudes towards Germany and the German population varied considerably.

One prominent position was represented by Robert Vansittart, who had been a vocal critic of Germany before and during the war. His belief that German militarism and aggression were deeply rooted in German society became associated with the term "Vansittartism" and encouraged a particularly distrustful attitude towards Germany in the immediate post-war period.

At the other end of the debate was the publisher and humanitarian Victor Gollancz, who argued that the German civilian population should not be collectively punished for the crimes of the Nazi regime. Concerned by the severe shortages and humanitarian conditions in post-war Germany, he founded the Save Europe Now campaign, which called for increased food and assistance for civilians in Germany and elsewhere in Europe.

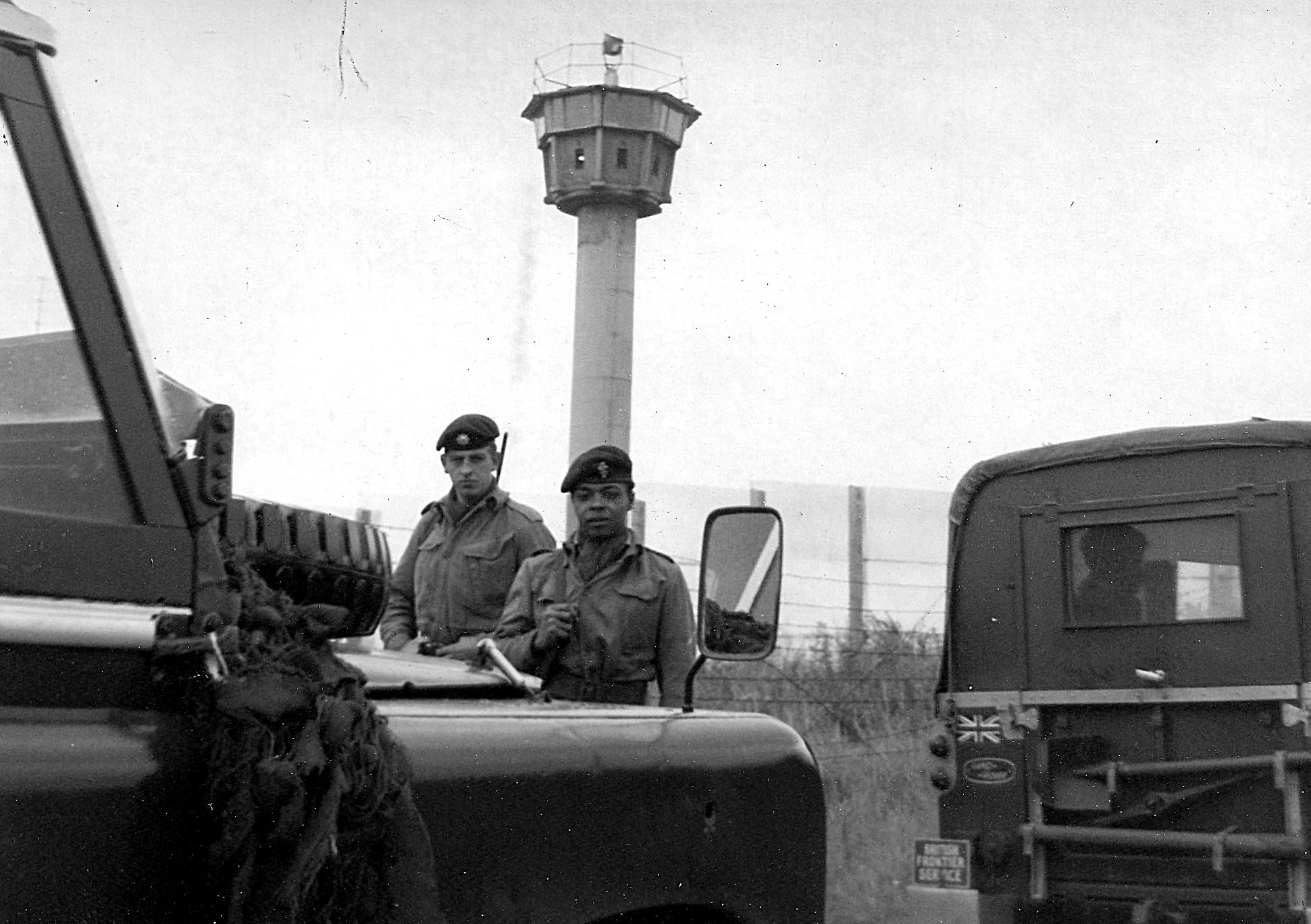
British Army patrol on the inner German border between Helmstedt and Wolfsburg in 1969.

In 1955 the Federal Republic became a fully sovereign state, the western occupation zones ceased to exist, and the high commissioners were replaced by ambassadors. The four allied powers nevertheless still had special rights and responsibilities in Germany until the Final Settlement of 1990.

From November 1951, the Canadian forces also deployed a contingent of 10,000 soldiers in several bases around Soest. In 1970, this however was reduced to fewer than 3,000 men and was then moved to Lahr, a town in the region of the Black Forest.

In 1954 the British Army headquarters was moved to Mönchengladbach, where it was known as JHQ Rheindahlen. The RAF in Germany was renamed with its original name RAF Second Tactical Air Force on 1 September 1951 and was then formed into Royal Air Force Germany (RAFG). British troops however still manned the Inner German Border; the British Frontier Service played a front-line role in managing tensions there. Its officers were called to the scene of border incidents or unusual activity to defuse disputes and provide an independent British view of situations. This continued until German reunification in 1991.

The BAOR and the RAFG were disbanded in 1994, following the end of the Cold War and the Options for Change defence review in the early 1990s. This meant that the British Armed Forces in Germany were reduced in strength by almost 30,000; with just one division (1st Armoured) remaining by the late 1990s. After this UK forces became known as British Forces Germany, and in 2020 became known as British Army Germany.

== Cultural legacy ==
- The German fast food dish currywurst which is attributed to Herta Heuwer was invented in Berlin in 1949, after she obtained tomato ketchup, Worcestershire sauce and curry powder from British soldiers garrisoned in the city around Charlottenburg.
- The 2019 film The Aftermath based upon Rhidian Brook's novel, depicts events in the British occupation zone in and around Hamburg during the winter of 1946.

== See also ==
- List of administrators of Allied-occupied Germany
- Allied-occupied Austria
- Interzonal traffic

== Bibliography ==
- Bance, Alan (1997). The Cultural Legacy of the British Occupation in Germany The London Symposium. Verlag H.-D. Heinz, Akademischer Verlag Stuttgart. ISBN 9780854571864.
- Biddiscombe, Perry (1998). Werwolf!: The History of the National Socialist Guerrilla Movement, 1944–1946. University of Toronto Press. ISBN 978-0-8020-0862-6.
- Bischoff, Gunter; Ambrose, Stephen (1992). "Introduction". In Bischoff, Gunter; Ambrose, Stephen (eds.). Eisenhower and the German POWs. New York: Louisiana State University Press. ISBN 0-8071-1758-7.
- Burgan, Michael (2008). The Berlin Airlift - Breaking the Soviet Blockade. Compass Point Books. ISBN 9780756534868.
- Crawley, Aidan (1973). The rise of Western Germany, 1945-1972. Collins. ISBN 9780002117289.
- Cowling, Daniel (2023). Don't Let's Be Beastly to the Germans The British Occupation of Germany, 1945-49. Bloomsbury Publishing. ISBN 9781800243521.
- Dodson, Aidan; Cant, Serena (2020). Spoils of War: the fate of enemy fleets after two World Wars. Barnsley: Seaforth. ISBN 9781526741981.
- Geraghty, Tony (1996). Brixmis: The Untold Exploits of Britain's Most Daring Cold War Spy Mission. London: HarperCollins. ISBN 0-00-638673-3.
- Jennings, Christian (2019). The Third Reich is Listening Inside German Codebreaking 1939–45. Bloomsbury USA. ISBN 9781472829542.
- John, Christopher (2012). The Race for Hitler's X-Planes: Britain's 1945 Mission To Capture Secret Luftwaffe Technology. The History Press. ISBN 9780752477114.
- Keshen, Jeffrey A (2013). Saints, Sinners, and Soldiers Canada's Second World War. UBC Press. ISBN 9780774850827.
- Klein, Leonora (2006). A Very English Hangman: The Life and Times of Albert Pierrepoint. London: Corvo Books. ISBN 978-0-9543255-6-5.
- Knowles, Christopher (2017). Winning the Peace: The British in Occupied Germany, 1945-1948. Bloomsbury Publishing. ISBN 9781474267434.
- Meehan, Patricia (2001). A strange enemy people: Germans under the British, 1945-1950. London: Peter Owen. ISBN 9780720611151.
- Overmans, Rudiger (1992). "German Histiography, the War Losses, and the Prisoners of War". In Bischoff, Gunter; Ambrose, Stephen (eds.). Eisenhower and the German POWs. New York: Louisiana State University Press. ISBN 0-8071-1758-7.
- Melvin, Mungo (2010). Manstein: Hitler's Greatest General. London: Weidenfeld & Nicolson. ISBN 978-0-297-84561-4.
- Parrish, Thomas (1986). The Ultra Americans: The U.S. Role in Breaking the Nazi Codes. New York: Stein and Day. ISBN 978-0-8128-3072-9.
- Rezabek, Randy (2017). TICOM: the Hunt for Hitler's Codebreakers. Independently published. ISBN 978-1521969021. Archived from the original on 26 May 2022.
- Stacy, William E (1984). "British Border Operations in Germany". US Army Border Operations in Germany. US Army Military History Office. OCLC 53275935. Archived from the original on 7 August 2012.
- Stephens, Lt. Col. R. G. W. (2000). Hoare, Oliver (ed.). Camp 020: MI5 and the Nazi Spies: the Official History of MI5's Wartime Interrogation Centre. Public Record Office. ISBN 1-903365-08-2.
- Tent, James F (1992). "Food Shortages in Germany and Europe 1945-1948". In Bischoff, Gunter; Ambrose, Stephen (eds.). Eisenhower and the German POWs. New York: Louisiana State University Press. ISBN 0-8071-1758-7.
- Taylor, Frederick (2011). Exorcising Hitler: The Occupation and Denazification of Germany. Bloomsbury Press. ISBN 978-1-60819-503-9.
- Todman, Daniel (2017). Britain's War: A New World, 1942-1947. Oxford University Press. ISBN 9780190658489.
- Tolliday, Steven; Zeitlin, Jonathan (2005). The Power to Manage?: Employers and Industrial Relations in Comparative Historical. Routledge. ISBN 9781134973255.
- Wierskalla, Sven (2007). Die Vereinigung der Verfolgten des Naziregimes (VVN) in der Sowjetischen Besatzungszone und in Berlin 1945 bis 1948 (in German). GRIN Verlag. ISBN 9783638716963.
- Williamson, David (1996). A Most Diplomatic General: The Life of General Lord Robertson of Oakridge. London: Brassey's. ISBN 1-85753-180-9. OCLC 36423582.
