= Hermann Borghorst =

German politician

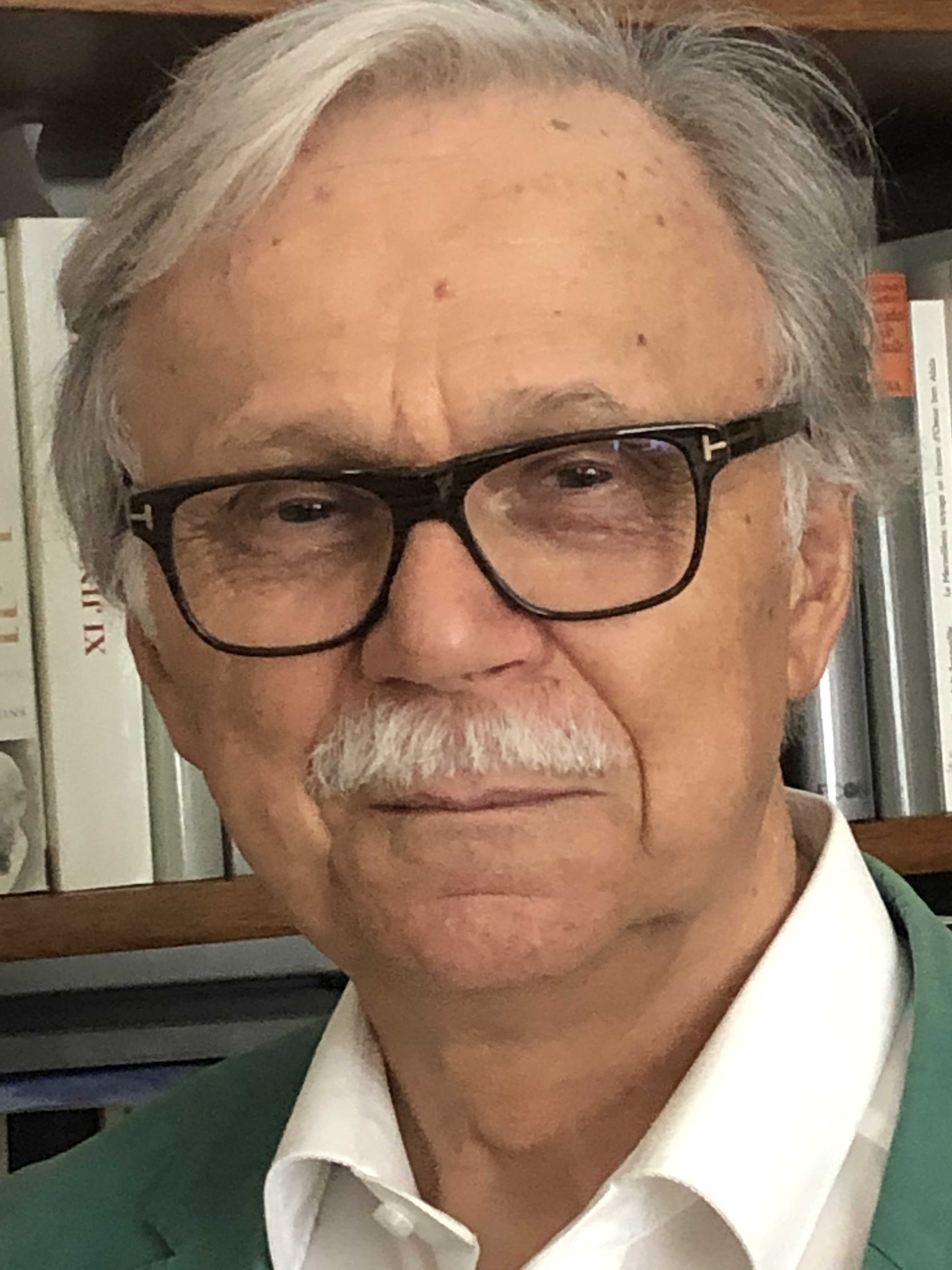
- Portrait of Borghorst, 2019
- Born: 1947 (age 78–79); Maczków, Polish occupation zone in Germany
- Political party: SPD
- Spouse: Helga Korthaase
- Board member of: Laubag; SV Tasmania Berlin

Academic background
- Education: Tulane University
- Thesis: Die wechselseitige Abhängigkeit von Bund und Kommunen in der Stadtsanierungspolitik der Vereinigten Staaten von Amerika (1979)
- Doctoral advisor: Hellmut Wollmann

Hermann Borghorst (born 1947) is a fossil fuel lobbyist and former politician of the Social Democratic Party of Germany (SPD).

== Biography ==
=== Early life and education ===
The eighth son of an Emsland craftsman, Borghorst was born in the town of Maczków in the Polish occupation zone in Germany.

Borghorst studied at the Otto Suhr Institute for Political Science, Free University of Berlin, and Sciences Po, before completing a doctorate at Tulane University.

=== Politics ===
Borghorst became a member of the SPD in 1970, and from 1985-1990 worked for the German Trade Union Confederation. He was first elected as an SPD representative to the Abgeordnetenhaus of Berlin in 1991. Within the SPD he was considered to be aligned to the party's right.

Following the 1995 Berlin state election, Borghorst became deputy chairman of the Berlin SPD parliamentary group. In 2000 he put himself forward for Chairman of the Berlin SPD, saying that the party structures needed reform.

=== Energy lobby ===
In 2001 Borghorst resigned from parliamentary politics to take up a position with the energy conglomerate Vattenfall. of which he remained a member until 2009. After leaving the board, he continued to lobby on behalf of the Lusation fossil fuel industry. This included vocal opposition to the energy policies of the state of Brandenburg, in particular he was critical of the phasing out of lignite by 2050 and moves to decommission the Jänschwalde Power Station, owned by his former employer. Borghorst was also critical of the Senate of Berlin's 2014 decision to award energy contracts to a state-owned company over the private supplier GASAG, another company owned by his former employer. A Greenpeace report identified Borghorst as a direct beneficiary of the SPD's apparent revolving door into the coal industry. The fluid relationship between the party and the fossil fuel industry has been seen as a roadblock to energy transition.
