= The Cologne Post =

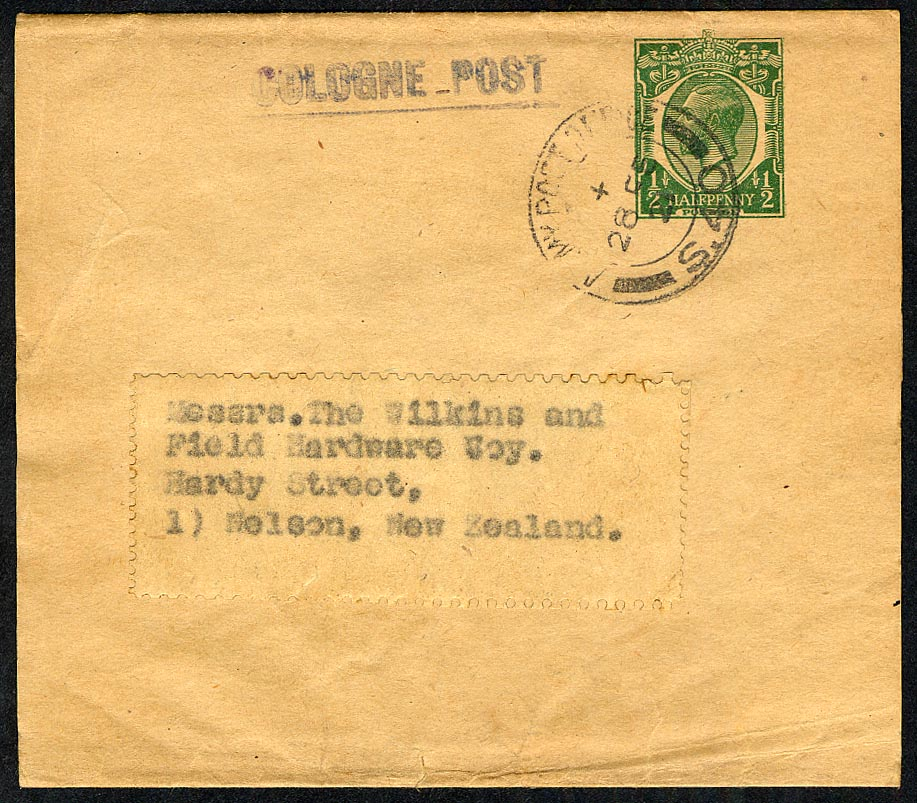
Newspaper wrapper from The Cologne Post postmarked by Army Post Office S40 on 28.05.21

The Cologne Post was a daily paper published for the British Armed Forces from 31 March 1919 to 17 January 1926. It then continued as The Cologne Post and Wiesbaden Times from 28 January 1926 - 3 November 1929. There was also an Upper Silesian edition published from 17 June to 6 August 1921 in Oppeln for the British Forces in Upper Silesia. William Edward Rolston was the founder and managing editor of The Cologne Post. Rolston was a Captain serving in the Buffs (Royal East Kent Regiment) The newspaper was printed in Cologne by Kölnische Volkszeitung.

On 1 August 1923 in a written reply to a question to the Under-Secretary of State for War, Lieut.-Colonel Guinness stated that "... The Cologne Post ... is an independent organisation not financed from Army funds"

Army Post Office S40 was established in Cologne, Germany in 1919 to provide postal support of the first British Army of the Rhine (BAOR) and was closed in 1929 when the force was finally withdrawn from Germany.
