= British Army of the Rhine =

Inactive occupation formation in Germany

- Active: 1919–1929; 1945–1994
- Country: United Kingdom
- Branch: British Army
- Part of: Northern Army Group
- Garrison/HQ: JHQ Rheindahlen, Germany

The British Army of the Rhine (BAOR) was the name given to British Army occupation forces in the Rhineland, after the First and Second World Wars, and during the Cold War, becoming part of NATO's Northern Army Group (NORTHAG) tasked with defending the North German Plain from the armies of the Warsaw Pact. The BAOR constituted the bulk of British forces in West Germany.

== History ==
=== 1919–1929 ===
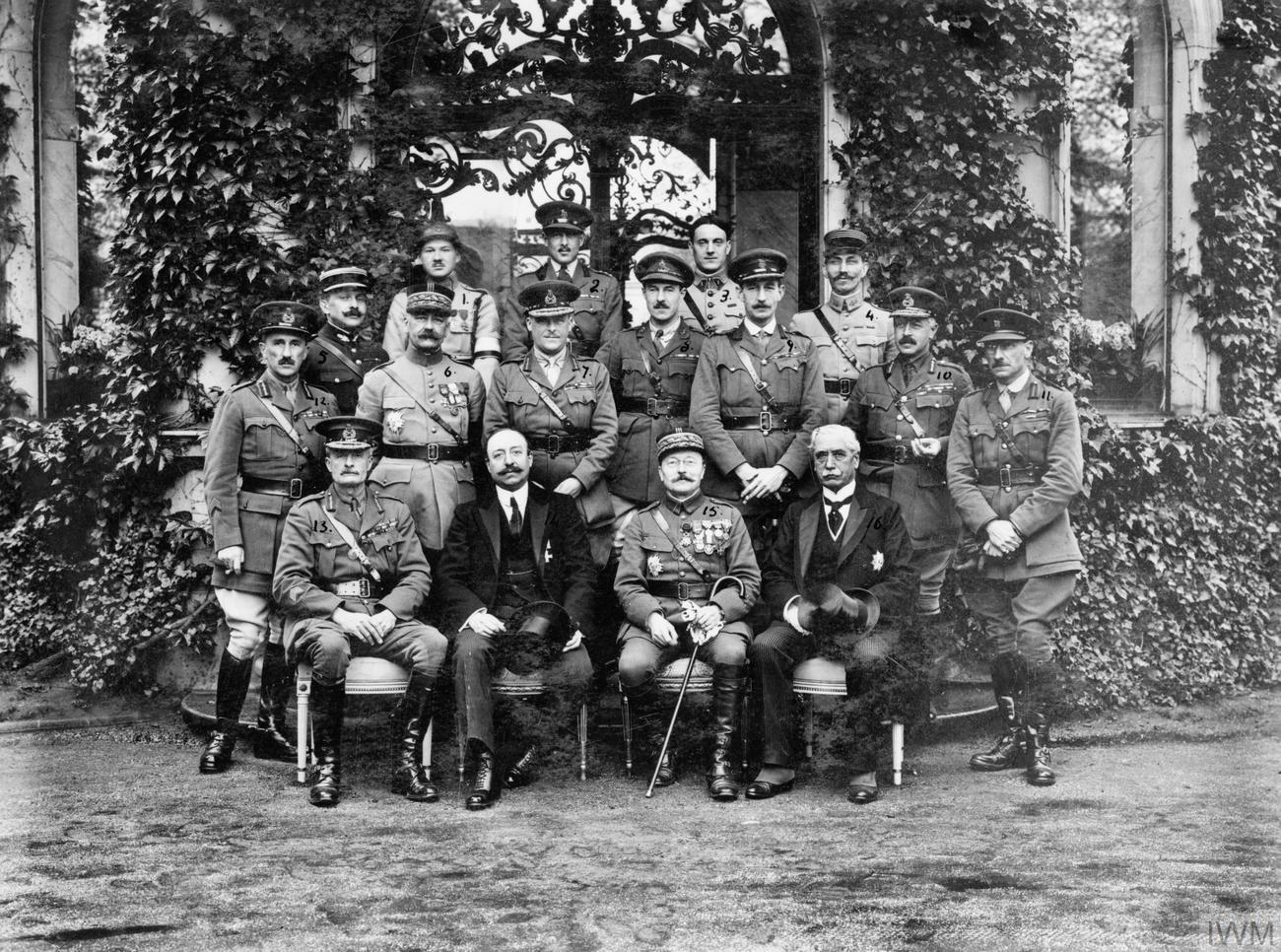
Formal group photograph of British and French officers and commissioners outside the house of the Commander-in-Chief Allied Armies of Occupation, Marienberg

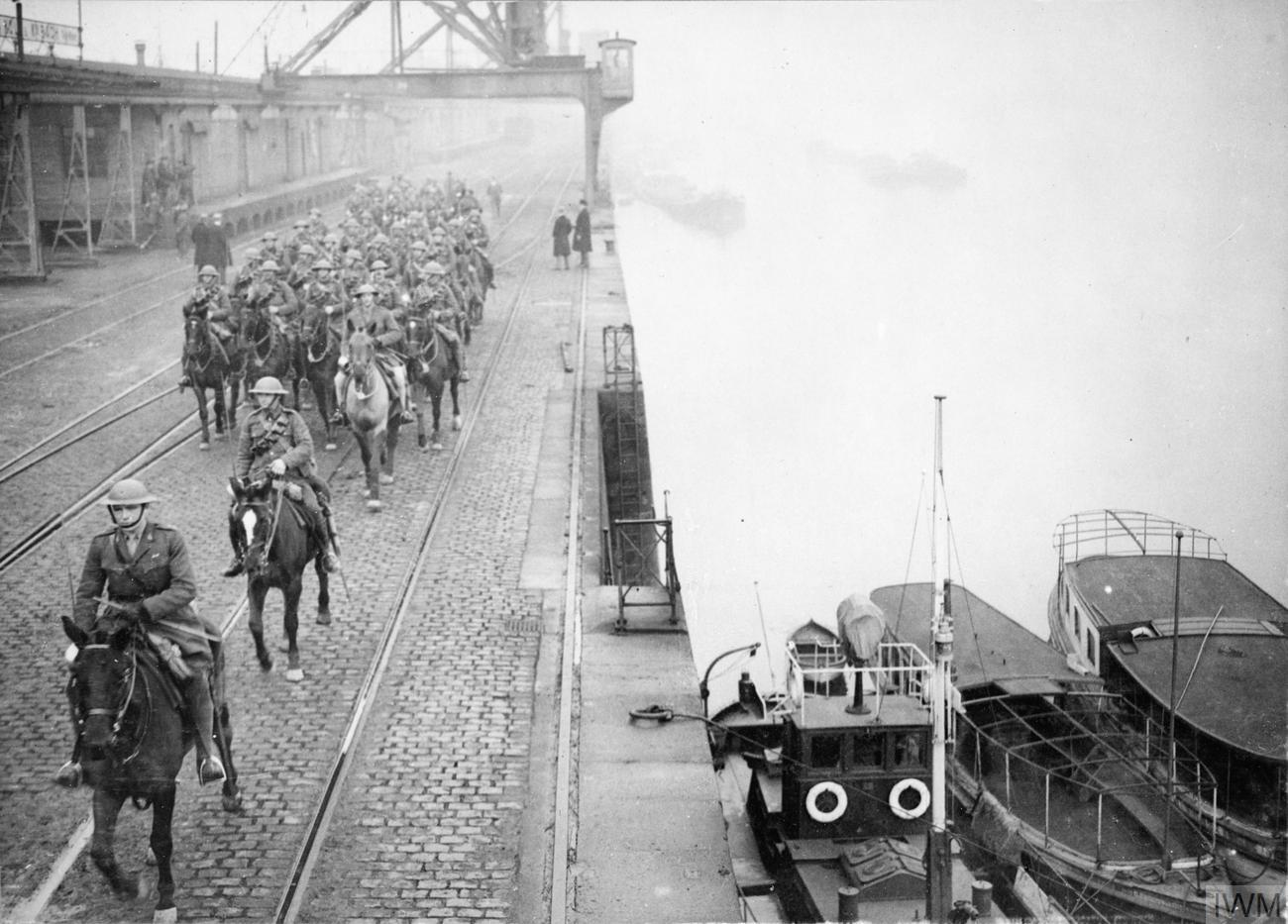
18th Hussars in Cologne, 6 December 1918

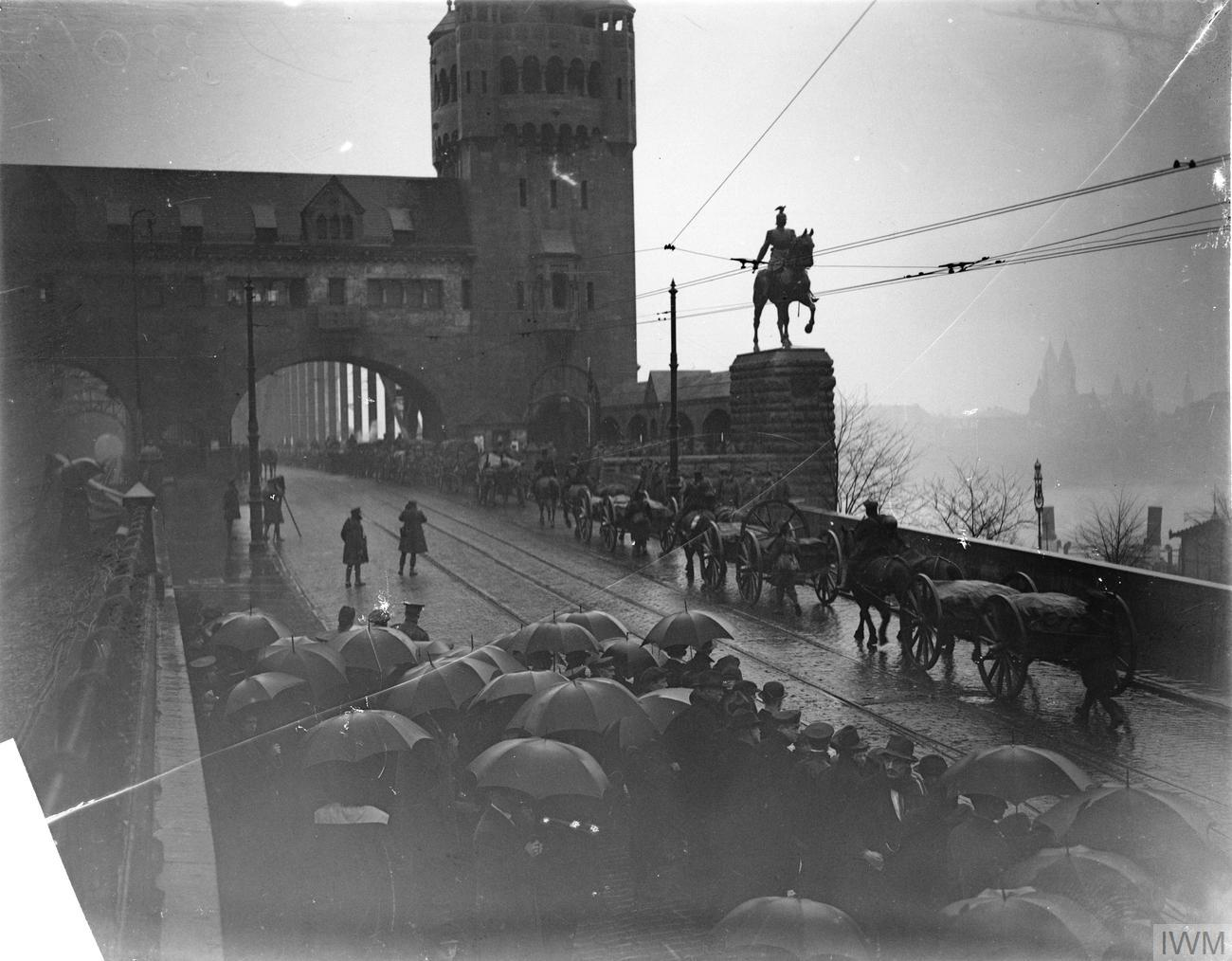
General Lord Plumer, General Officer Commanding-in-Chief the British Army of the Rhine, taking the salute from the 29th Division entering Cologne by the Hohenzollern Bridge

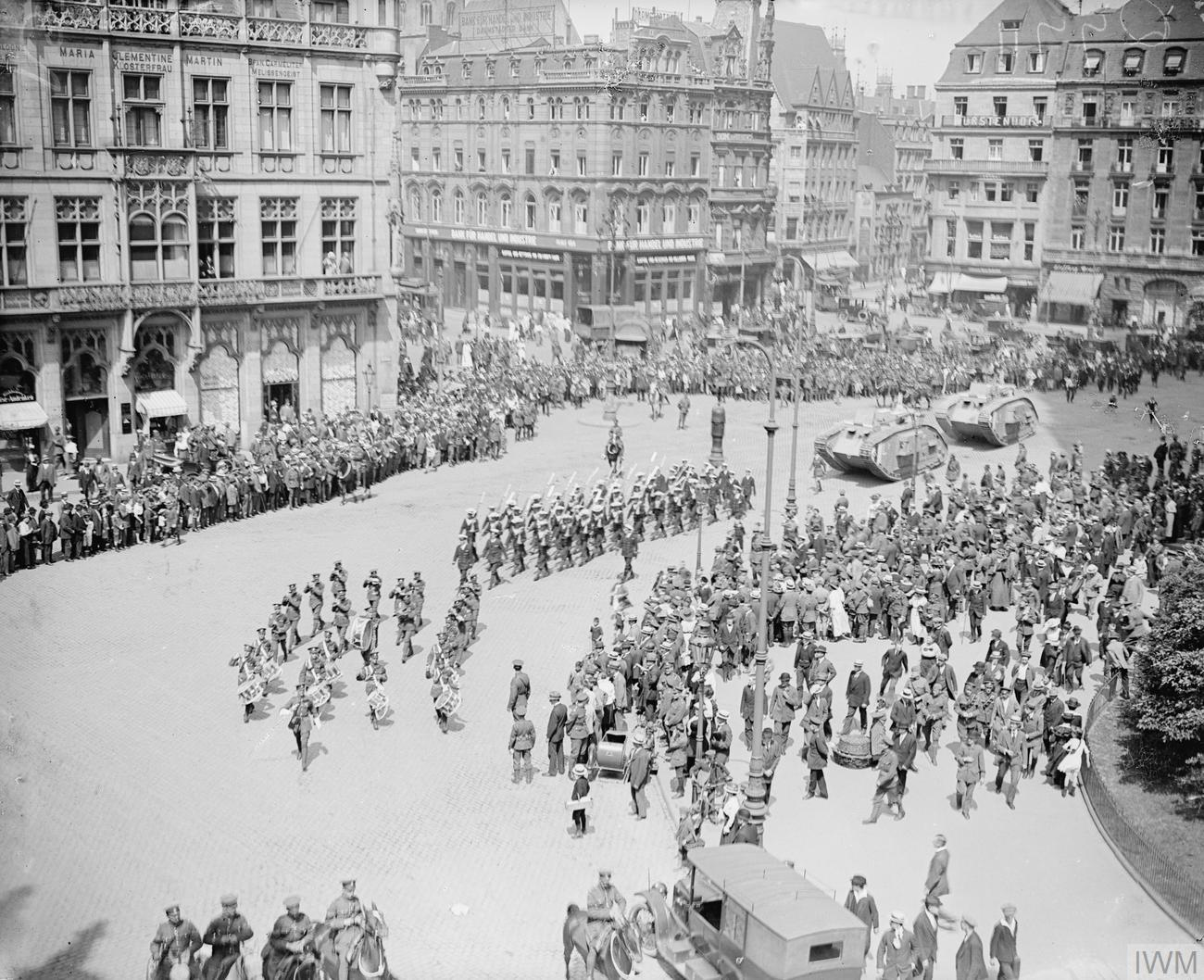
Two tanks passing through Cologne for inspection by the VI Corps commander, Lieutenant General Sir Aylmer Haldane, June 1919

The first British Army of the Rhine was created in March 1919 to implement the occupation of the Rhineland. It was originally composed of five corps, composed of two divisions each, plus a cavalry division:

II Corps: commanded by Sir Claud Jacob

- Light Division (formed from 2nd Division): commanded by Major-General George Jeffreys
- Southern Division (formed from 29th Division): commanded by Major-General William Heneker

IV Corps: commanded by Sir Alexander Godley

- Lowland Division (formed from 9th (Scottish) Division)
- Highland Division (formed from 62nd (2nd West Riding) Division)

VI Corps: commanded by Sir Aylmer Haldane

- Northern Division (formed from 3rd Division)
- London Division (formed from 41st Division)

IX Corps: commanded by Sir Walter Braithwaite and later by Ivor Maxse

- Western Division (formed from 1st Division)
- Midland Division (formed from 6th Division)

X Corps: commanded by Sir Thomas Morland

- Lancashire Division (formed from 32nd Division)
- Eastern Division (formed from 34th Division)

Cavalry Division (formed from 1st Cavalry Division)

Most of these units were progressively dissolved, so that by February 1920, there were only regular battalions:

- 1st Battalion Royal Irish Regiment
- 4th Battalion Worcestershire Regiment
- 2nd Battalion Black Watch (Royal Highlanders)
- 1st Battalion Middlesex Regiment
- 3rd Battalion Middlesex Regiment
- 1st Battalion Durham Light Infantry

In August 1920, Winston Churchill, as Secretary of State for War, told Parliament that the BAOR was made up of approximately 13,360 troops, consisting of staff, cavalry, Royal Artillery, Royal Engineers, infantry, machine gun corps, tanks, and the usual ancillary services. The troops were located principally in the vicinity of Cologne at an approximate cost per month of £300,000. The Cologne Post was a newspaper published for members of the BAOR during this period.

From 1922, the BAOR was organised into two brigades:

1st Rhine Brigade

- 1st Battalion Northumberland Fusiliers 1922 to 1926
- 1st Battalion West Yorkshire Regiment 1922 to 1926
- 2nd Battalion Queen's Own Cameron Highlanders 1922 to 1926
- 1st Battalion York and Lancaster Regiment 1922 to 1924
- 2nd Battalion Royal Berkshire Regiment 1926 to 1928
- 2nd Battalion Royal Welch Fusiliers November 1926 to October 1929
- 2nd Battalion Worcestershire Regiment 1926 to 1928

2nd Rhine Brigade

- 2nd Battalion Duke of Cornwall's Light Infantry 1922 to 1924
- 1st Battalion King's Own Yorkshire Light Infantry 1922 to 1924
- 2nd Battalion King's Royal Rifle Corps 1922 to 1925
- 1st Battalion Royal Ulster Rifles 1922 to 1926
- 1st Battalion Manchester Regiment 1923 to 1924
- 2nd Battalion King's Shropshire Light Infantry 1924 to 1927
- 1st Battalion Oxford and Bucks Light Infantry 1925 to 1927
- 2nd Battalion Royal Fusiliers 1926 to 1929
- 2nd Battalion Leicestershire Regiment 1927 to 1929
- 2nd Battalion Dorsetshire Regiment 1928 to 1929

Commanders-in-chief

The commanders were:

- Field Marshal Lord Plumer 1918 to 1919
- General Sir William Robertson 1919 to 1920
- General Sir Thomas Morland 1920 to 1922
- General Sir Alexander Godley 1922 to 1924
- General Sir John Du Cane 1924 to 1927
- General Sir William Thwaites 1927 to 1929

=== Cold War (1945–1991) ===
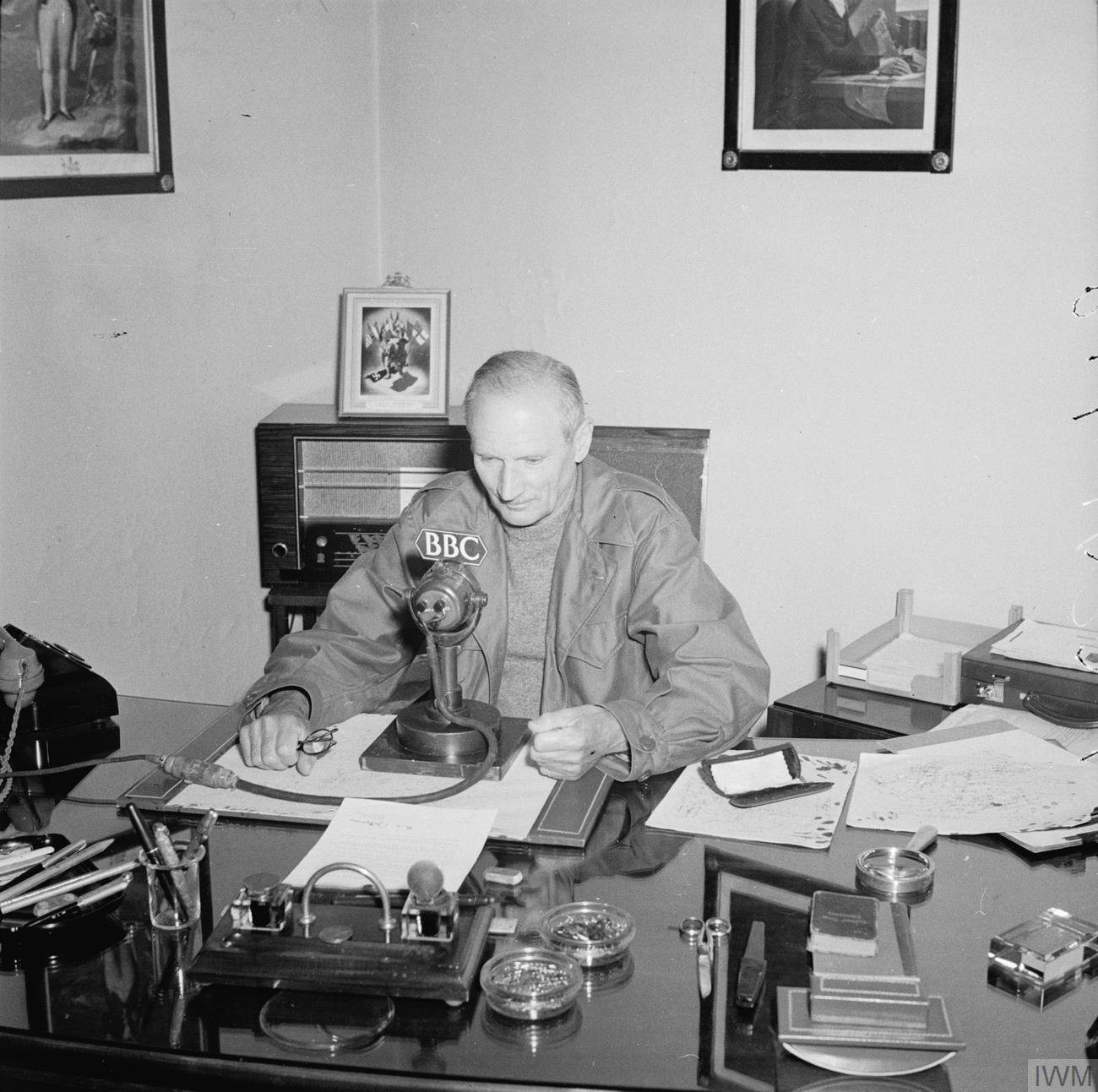
Field Marshal Viscount Montgomery recording a radio broadcast, to mark the changeover of the British Liberation Army to the BAOR

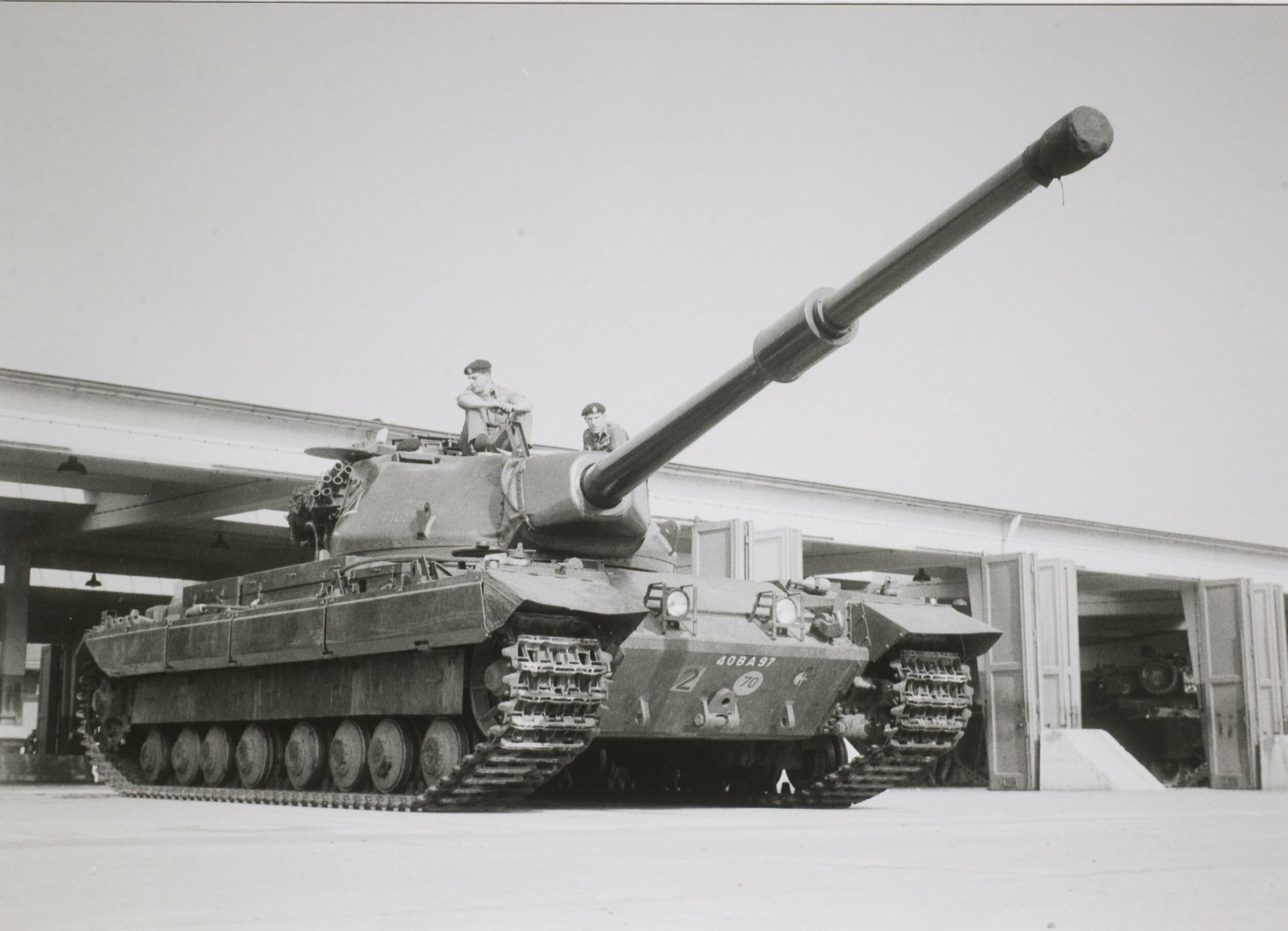
BAOR Conqueror Tank in 1962

The second British Army of the Rhine was formed on 25 August 1945 from the British Liberation Army. Its original function was to control the corps districts which were running the military government of the British zone of Allied-occupied Germany. After the assumption of government by civilians, it became the command formation for the troops in West Germany only, rather than being responsible for administration as well.

As the potential threat of Soviet invasion across the North German Plain into West Germany increased, BAOR became more responsible for the defence of West Germany than its occupation. It became the primary formation controlling the British contribution to NATO, after the formation of the alliance in 1949. Its primary combat formation was British I Corps. From 1952, the Commander-in-Chief of the BAOR was also the commander of NATO's Northern Army Group (NORTHAG) in the event of a general war with the Soviet Union and its Warsaw Pact allies. The BAOR's 50 Missile Regiment Royal Artillery was formerly armed with tactical nuclear weapons, including the MGM-52 Lance surface-to-surface tactical nuclear missile. 39 Missile Regiment and 24 Missile Regiment were also equipped with MGM-52 Lance and MGR-1 Honest John nuclear missiles. In October 1954 HQ BAOR relocated from Bad Oeynhausen to Rheindahlen.

There were significant reductions in the force in 1955–58. British financial difficulties grew in the autumn of 1957, with gold and dollar reserves falling significantly further. As a result of continuing financial pressures, "Britain secured NATO's and [the] WEU's agreement to a second reduction in BAOR from 63,500 to 55,000 men (about 7 brigade groups) for FY1958/9." In 1967, the force was reduced in strength to 53,000 soldiers, compared with 80,000, ten years earlier.

There were a series of exercises in BAOR in 1975 under the code name "Wide Horizon" to test the new small-division organisation as thoroughly as possible in command post and field training exercises. It culminated in a field exercise involving elements of two divisions. Following the exercises BAOR was reorganised from three to four divisions in January 1978.

By 1984 the BAOR was the largest overseas deployment of British troops. While troops numbers in Hong Kong and the Falkland Islands numbered 9,000 and 2,500 respectively, the BAOR had 50,000 soldiers stationed in Germany, with a further 150,000 Germans working for the BAOR. The direct public expenditure cost of this force was about £2.6 billion in 1984.

In 1979, the Provisional Irish Republican Army and the Irish National Liberation Army began a series of bomb attacks against British Army barracks in Germany and Northern Europe. For example, in March 1987, 31 people were injured by a car bomb at Rheindahlen, and, in 1988, the IRA bombed both Roy and Glamorgan barracks, injuring three people in the Roy barracks attack in Ratingen and nine in the Glamorgan attack near Düsseldorf.

=== Post 1994 ===
With the end of the Cold War, the 1993 Options for Change defence cuts resulted in BAOR being reduced in size, and in 1994 it became British Forces Germany (BFG). This force, roughly 25,000 strong, was divided between Headquarters Allied Command Europe Rapid Reaction Corps, 1st Armoured Division, other combat support and combat service support forces, and administrative elements headed by United Kingdom Support Command (Germany). Garrisons that closed at this time included Soest (home of the 6th Armoured Brigade), Soltau (home of the 7th Armoured Brigade), and Minden (home of the 11th Armoured Brigade).

Following the 2010 Strategic Defence and Security Review, the permanent deployment of British Army units in Germany was reduced. The last military base was handed to the German Bundeswehr in February 2020.

Commanders-in-chief

The commanders were:

- Field Marshal Viscount Montgomery 1945 to 1946
- Lieutenant General Sir Richard McCreery 1946 to 1948
- Lieutenant General Sir Brian Horrocks 1948
- Lieutenant General Sir Charles Keightley 1948 to 1951
- General Sir John Harding 1951 to 1952
- General Sir Richard Gale 1952 to 1957
- General Sir Dudley Ward 1957 to 1960
- General Sir James Cassels 1960 to 1963
- General Sir William Stirling 1963 to 1966
- General Sir John Hackett 1966 to 1968
- General Sir Desmond Fitzpatrick 1968 to 1970
- General Sir Peter Hunt 1970 to 1973
- General Sir Harry Tuzo 1973 to 1976
- General Sir Frank King 1976 to 1978
- General Sir William Scotter 1978 to 1980
- General Sir Michael Gow 1980 to 1983
- General Sir Nigel Bagnall 1983 to 1985
- General Sir Martin Farndale 1985 to 1987
- General Sir Brian Kenny 1987 to 1989
- General Sir Peter Inge 1989 to 1992
- General Sir Charles Guthrie 1992 to May 1994 (command disbanded)

Garrisons

- Bergen-Hohne Garrison
- Osnabrück Garrison
- Westfalen Garrison

== See also ==
- Royal Air Force Germany
- British military history
- Canadian Forces Europe
- Mixed Service Organisation

== Sources ==
- Blume, Peter (2006), BAOR – Vehicles Of The British Army Of The Rhine – Fahrzeuge der Britischen Rheinarmee – 1945–1979, Tankograd
- Blume, Peter (2007), BAOR: The Final Years – Vehicles Of The British Army Of The Rhine – Fahrzeuge der Britischen Rheinarmee – 1980–1994, Tankograd
- Dockrill, Saki (1997). "Retreat from the continent? Britain's motives for troop reductions in West Germany, 1955–1958". Journal of Strategic Studies. 20 (3): 45–70.
- Gander, T.J. (1984). British Army of the Rhine. London: Ian Allan Publishing.
- Laber, Thomas (1991). British Army of the Rhine – Armoured Vehicles on exercise. Hong Kong: Concord Publications.
- Schulze, Carl (1995). British Army Of The Rhine. Diane Pub Co.
- Watson, Graham; Rinaldi, Richard A. (2005). The British Army in Germany: An Organizational History 1947–2004. Tiger Lily Publications LLC.
