= British Liberation Army =

British Army forces which fought on the Western Front of World War II

The British Liberation Army (BLA) was the official name given to the British Army forces which fought on the Western Front of the Second World War, between the Invasion of Normandy and the end of the war. Almost all BLA units were assigned to the 21st Army Group, which also included forces from other countries.

Following the war the BLA was redesignated to become the British Army of the Rhine (BAOR) in August 1945.
