= Polish occupation zone in Germany =

Zone of Polish occupation in Germany following World War II

Polish occupation zone in Germany Polnische Besatzungszone Deutschlands Polska strefa okupacyjna w Niemczech
- Military occupation zone of the Polish government-in-exile part of Allied-occupied Germany
- 1945–1948
- Flag of Poland
- Capital: Maczków
- Area
  - 1945: 6,470 km^{2} (2,500 sq mi)
- Population
  - 1945: 48 000
  - Type: Military occupation under administration of the Polish government-in-exile, within the British occupation zone in Germany
- Historical era: Post-World War II era Cold War
  - Established: 19 May 1945
  - Disestablished: 10 September 1948
Preceded by	Succeeded by
Nazi Germany	Trizone
- Today part of: Germany

The Polish occupation zone in Germany (Note: Polish: Polska strefa okupacyjna w Niemczech; German: Polnische Besatzungszone Deutschlands) was a military occupation area, under the administration of the Polish government-in-exile, located within the British Occupation Zone of the Allied-occupied Germany, that existed from 19 May 1945 to 10 September 1948. It was established from the territory of the British-controlled occupied Nazi Germany, following its surrender ending the World War II, and existed until 10 September 1948, when the administration of the area was given back to the United Kingdom. The zone was created for the Polish displaced people, consisting of those freed from German labour camps and concentration camps, and prisoners of war. In 1945, it was inhabited by over 30,000 Polish civilians and around 18,000 soldiers, and had an area of 6,470 km^{2}, being located within the area of modern districts of County of Bentheim, Cloppenburg, Emsland, and Osnabrück, within Lower Saxony, Germany. Its seat was located in the town of Haren, then renamed to Maczków.

== History ==
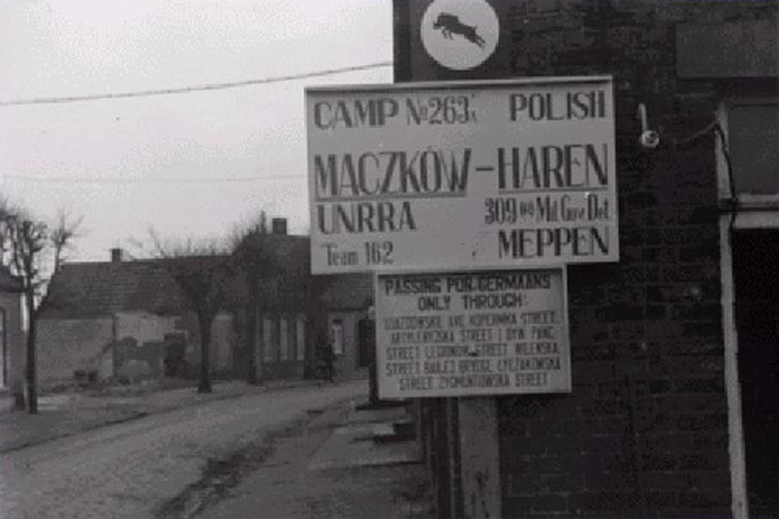
Entrance sign at the boundary of the town of Maczków in 1945.

At the end of World War II there were over 3 million Polish citizens in Germany, most of them displaced persons (DPs) who got there either as slave labourers, prisoners of German concentration camps or prisoners of war. As the political situation in Communist-controlled Poland was uncertain, the Allied authorities decided to create a Polish enclave in Germany that would serve both as a resettlement camp, local cultural centre and a station from which the DPs could further be dispatched to Poland or various western states. As Haren lay in the occupation zone administered by the Polish I Corps (and more specifically the Polish 1st Armoured Division), it was chosen as the most appropriate centre of a Polish enclave in Germany.

On 19 May 1945, the Polish 1st Armoured Division, a unit attached to the British Army moved all of the thousand families of Haren out to surrounding communities. Over 4000 Poles from Labor camps and prisoner-of-war camps in Northern Germany moved into the town. Many of them had been members of the Polish Home Army, men and women, who had fought in the Warsaw Uprising of 1944.

Initially, the new Polish enclave was named Lwów, after the city in South-Eastern Poland by then occupied and later annexed by the Soviet Union. However, under Soviet pressure the name was then changed to Maczków, in honour of General Stanislaw Maczek, the commanding officer of the Armoured Division and the local Allied occupation forces. The streets in the town were renamed to Polish, either honouring various military units (Legionów Str., Artyleryjska Str.) or named after streets in Warsaw (Ujazdowskie Avenue).

During the next months, a Polish town with a Polish mayor, a Polish school, a folk high school, a Polish fire brigade and a Polish rectory were established. The latter registered 289 weddings and 101 funerals. 479 Poles have birth certificates showing Maczków as a place of birth. As there were hundreds of thousands of Poles in the area administered by the 1st Armoured Division, "Maczków" also served as a cultural centre: newspapers were being published there on a daily basis (Dziennik and Defilada eventually reaching 90 thousand copies), a theatre was opened (led by Leon Schiller) and concert halls were active. Among the most notable events held in the Polish enclave was a 1947 concert by Benjamin Britten and Lord Yehudi Menuhin.

In the Autumn of 1946, the Polish forces stationed in North-Western Germany started to be demobilised and ferried back to the United Kingdom. Also, the civilian inhabitants started to return to Poland or move to other European states. Eventually, by the end of 1948, the town was returned to the original inhabitants (and renamed back to Haren).
