= Mixed Service Organisation =

Civilian arm of the British Army of the Rhine

The Mixed Service Organisation (MSO) was a civilian arm of the British Army of the Rhine (BAOR) which employed displaced persons as drivers, clerks, mechanics and guards. Originally formed as Watchman and labour units in the immediate aftermath of the Second World War the MSO employed citizens of Eastern European nations occupied by the Soviets. These former prisoners of war, concentration camp inmates and forced labourers were left in western sectors of occupied Germany at the end of the war and chose not to return to their countries of origin. Whilst some displaced persons only worked with the organisation for a short time others stayed until retirement age. The MSO was organised in a structure similar to British Colonial Units, with a British Commanding Officer and senior Non-commissioned officers operating over a 'native' officer and NCO structure. Whilst the Transport Service was disbanded in the late 1980s the MSO Guard and Labour Services continued into the 1990s using guest labour from Turkey, Pakistan and other Non-EU Countries. There was also a contingency of ex British soldiers, most of whom were married to German girls, unemployed northern English men from Liverpool and Manchester a Scot as well as a sole French foreign legionnaire prior to its disbandment.

Members of the MSO were known affectionately as "Mojos" by British servicemen.

== Composition ==
The MSO was divided into several specialist services:

MSO Armed Guard Service, guarding army installations (wore navy blue Battle Dress uniforms and armed with obsolete .303 calibre Lee–Enfield rifles)

MSO Dog Handlers, guarding army installations.

MSO Labour Service, providing manual labour, controlled by the Royal Pioneer Corps.

MSO Transport Service, driving 4 and 10 ton lorries, coaches and tank transporters, controlled by the Royal Army Service Corps then the Royal Corps of Transport.
