= List of Freedom of the City recipients =

The Freedom of the City, in military terms, is an honour conferred by a city council upon a military unit, which grants that unit the privilege of marching into the city "with drums beating, colours flying, and bayonets fixed". The honour is usually bestowed upon local regiments, in recognition of their dedicated service, and it is common for military units to periodically exercise their freedom by arranging a parade through the city.

== Australia ==
=== Adelaide, South Australia ===
- HMAS Adelaide
- No. 24 Squadron RAAF
- 10th Battalion, Royal South Australia Regiment

=== Alice Springs, Northern Territory ===
- NORFORCE: 1984
- HMAS Arunta
- Detachment 421, United States Air Force
- No. 1 Radar Surveillance Unit, Royal Australian Air Force

=== Ararat, Victoria ===
- HMAS Ararat II: 16 June 2018.

=== Bairnsdale, Victoria ===
- The 4th/19th Prince of Wales's Light Horse: 15 March 1986.

=== Ballarat, Victoria ===
- HMAS Ballarat, RAN: 2 December 2004.

=== City of Banyule, Victoria ===
- The Defence Force School of Signals: 5 October 2025.

=== Bendigo, Victoria ===
- 17th Construction Squadron Workshop: 20 October 2015.

=== Brisbane, Queensland ===
- Brisbane Port Division, RANR: 8 October 1983.

=== Broome, Western Australia ===
- NORFORCE: 1987

=== Cairns, Queensland ===
- HMAS Cairns, RAN: 26 June 2022.

=== Canberra, Australian Capital Territory ===
- Australian Defence Force Academy: 15 September 1995.
- 2001: Royal Military College Duntroon, during that year's GMC 400.
- USS Canberra, USN: 20 July 2023.
- HMAS Canberra, RAN:30 November 2024.

=== Charters Towers, Queensland ===
- 1st Battalion, Royal Australian Regiment: 23 June 1977.

=== City of Coffs Harbour, New South Wales ===
- 725 Squadron, RAN: 19 May 2016.

=== Darwin, Northern Territory ===
- NORFORCE: 1982 and 2016
- HMAS Darwin: October 1985.
- HMAS Coonawarra, RAN: 2013.

=== Derby, Western Australia ===
- NORFORCE: 1983

=== Devonport, Tasmania ===
- HMAS Stuart, RAN: 2014.

=== Gawler, South Australia ===
- HMAS Gawler, RAN: 26 April 1986.

=== Gold Coast, Queensland ===
- 41st Field Battery, Royal Australian Artillery: 1967.
- 1st Military District Band: 1989.
- 213 Squadron Australian Air Force Cadets: 30 October 2016.
- 221 Squadron Australian Air Force Cadets: 30 October 2016.
- 222 Squadron Australian Air Force Cadets: 30 October 2016.
- 232 Squadron Australian Air Force Cadets: 30 October 2016.

=== Gosford, New South Wales ===
- TS Hawkesbury, Australian Navy Cadets.

=== Goulburn, New South Wales ===
- 325 (City of Goulburn) Squadron Australian Air Force Cadets: 7 October 2020.

=== Ingham, Queensland ===
- 3rd Battalion, Royal Australian Regiment: 22 October 2022.

=== Ipswich, Queensland ===
- RAAF Base Amberley: 17 June 1970.

=== Kalgoorlie, Western Australia ===
- 16th Battalion The Royal Western Australia Regiment: 19 September 1987

=== Katherine, Northern Territory ===
- NORFORCE: 1986
- RAAF Base Tindal: 29 September 2018.

=== Kingaroy, Queensland ===
- The Defence Force School of Signals Electronic Warfare Wing: 8 July 2017.

=== Kogarah, New South Wales ===
- 9th Regiment, Royal Australian Artillery: 14 April 2018.

=== Ku-ring-gai, New South Wales ===
- 17th Battalion The Royal New South Wales Regiment: 17 September 1978.

=== Kununurra, Western Australia ===
- NORFORCE: 1990

=== Lake Macquarie ===
- HMAS Tobruk, RAN: 9 August 1991.

=== Launceston, Tasmania ===
- 508 (City of Launceston) Squadron Australian Air Force Cadets: 21 March 2021.
- TS Tamar Australian Navy Cadets: 21 March 2021.
- 52 ACU Launceston Australian Army Cadets: 21 March 2021.
- 67 ACU Youngtown Australian Army Cadets: 21 March 2021.

=== Liverpool ===
- School of Military Engineering: 1959.

=== Maitland, New South Wales ===
- HMAS Maitland, RAN: 30 September 2006.
- 308 (City of Maitland) Squadron Australian Air Force Cadets: 16 November 2013.

=== Melbourne ===
- The Melbourne University Regiment: 29 September 2009.
- HMAS Cerberus: 16 September 2011.
- HMAS Melbourne
- The Defence Force School of Signals.

=== City of Moreton Bay, Queensland ===
- 1st Signal Regiment The Royal Australian Corps of Signals: 18 October 2025.

=== Mosman, New South Wales ===
- HMAS Penguin, RAN: 28 October 2025.

=== Nambour, Queensland ===
- 207 (City of Nambour) Squadron, Australian Air Force Cadets: 17 June 2023

=== Newcastle, New South Wales ===
- HMAS Newcastle: 13 December 1994.

=== Normanton, Queensland ===
- 1st Battalion, Royal Australian Regiment: 12 October 1974

=== Northam, Western Australia ===
- 10th Light Horse Regiment: 1979

=== North Sydney, New South Wales ===
- HMAS Platypus, RAN: 27 November 1992.

=== Nowra, New South Wales ===
- HMAS Albatross, RAN: 1979.
- HMAS Creswell, RAN: 1979.

=== Onkaparinga, South Australia ===
- 40th Regional Cadet Unit Noarlunga: 1998.
- Squadron 605 Australian Air Force Cadets: 2004.
- Australian Navy Cadets TS Noarlunga: 2004.

=== Parramatta ===
- The 1st/15th Royal New South Wales Lancers: 18 October 1959.
- HMAS Parramatta, RAN: 28 July 2003.

=== Perth ===
- HMAS Perth, RAN: 4 March 1966.
- 16th Battalion, The Royal Western Australia Regiment: 2 October 1960.
- 11th/28th Battalion, The Royal Western Australia Regiment.
- No. 25 (City of Perth) Squadron RAAF: 2 March 1976
- The 10th Light Horse Regiment: 25 March 2023.
- 7 Wing Australian Air Force Cadets: 9 September 2026.

=== Port Stephens ===
- 130 Signals Squadron

=== Queanbeyan, New South Wales ===
- HMAS Harman, RAN: 17 October 1981.

=== Redland City ===
- 95 Wing RAAF: 12 April 2014.

=== City of Rockingham ===
- HMAS Stirling, RAN: 12 November 1988.

=== Sale ===
- RAAF Base East Sale: 1959.

=== Salisbury, South Australia ===
- RAAF Base Edinburgh: 26 March 1988.

=== Shoalhaven, New South Wales ===
- Fleet Air Arm, RAN:21 October 2022.
- HMAS Albatross, RAN:21 October 2022.
- HMAS Creswell, RAN:21 October 2022.

=== Sydney ===
- Royal Australian Navy: 14 March 2009
- HMAS Sydney
- 3 Wing, Australian Air Force Cadets

=== Tamworth, New South Wales ===
- 12th/16th Hunter River Lancers.

=== Tennant Creek ===
- NORFORCE: 1994

=== City of Toowoomba, Queensland ===
- 7th Signal Regiment: 1975.

=== Toowoomba Region, Queensland ===
- 7th Signal Regiment: 20 September 2025.

=== Townsville, Queensland ===
- 2nd Battalion, Royal Australian Regiment: 15 October 1971.
- 1st Battalion, Royal Australian Regiment: 25 August 1996
- 3rd Brigade Lavarack Barracks: 27 August 2014.
- The Australian Army Band Corps: 28 May 2022.

=== City of Unley, South Australia ===
- 10th/27th Battalion The Royal South Australia Regiment: 2006.

=== Wagga Wagga ===
- RAAF Base Wagga Wagga: 1961.
- The Australian Army Band Kapooka: 15 October 2023.

=== Whitsunday Region ===
- 3rd Combat Engineer Regiment (Australia): 11 May 2024.

=== Wollongong ===
- HMAS Wollongong, RAN: 27 August 2017.
- 4th/3rd Battalion, Royal New South Wales Regiment.

On 27 September 1980 the officers and crew of the Australian submarine HMAS Orion were granted the Freedom of the City of Wollongong in perpetuity.

=== Wyndham, Western Australia ===
- NORFORCE: 1986

== Belgium ==
=== Herentals ===
- Ordnance Depot Antwerp: 1987.

=== Ypres ===
- Princess Patricia's Canadian Light Infantry: 1964.

== Canada ==
=== Alberta ===
==== Airdrie ====
- Calgary Highlanders

==== Banff ====
- 3 Squadron 41 Signal Regiment: 22 October 2016.
- Rocky Mountain National Army Cadet Summer Training Centre (formerly BNACC)

==== Bon Accord ====
- 1 Combat Engineer Regiment: 3 June 2017.

==== Bonnyville ====
- The Royal Canadian Legion (Bonnyville Branch 183): 1 July 2016.
- 4 Wing Cold Lake: 5 May 2017.

==== Canmore ====
- 878 Banff/Canmore Royal Canadian Air Cadet Squadron

==== Calgary ====
- Calgary Highlanders: 1956.
- 1st Battalion The Queen's Own Rifles of Canada: 11 June 1960.
- King's Own Calgary Regiment
- Lord Strathcona's Horse (Royal Canadians)
- HMCS Calgary
- 4 Wing Cold Lake: 11 May 1999.
- HMCS Tecumseh
- 41 Signal Regiment
- 14 (Calgary) Service Battalion: 24 April 1982.
- 41 Service Battalion: 19 October 2019.
- 52 City of Calgary Air Cadets
- 538 Buffalo Squadron
- 22 RCSCC Undaunted

==== Cold Lake ====
- 4 Wing Cold Lake: 27 August 2004.

==== Drumheller ====
- Correctional Service of Canada: 9 September 2017.

==== Edmonton ====
- Princess Patricia's Canadian Light Infantry: 1966. (exercised in 2004 and on 10 August 2014 on occasion of the 100th Anniversary of the Regiment).
- The Canadian Airborne Regiment: 1976.
- The Loyal Edmonton Regiment (4th Battalion, Princess Patricia's Canadian Light Infantry)
- 15 (Edmonton) Service Battalion: 3 June 1995.
- 408 Tactical Helicopter Squadron, RCAF: 2001.
- HMCS Nonsuch
- 1 Service Battalion: 26 August 2018.

==== Fort McMurray ====
- Royal Canadian Mounted Police (Wood Buffalo Detachment): 21 September 2013.

==== Gibbons ====
- Princess Patricia's Canadian Light Infantry: 15 September 2014.
- Canadian Military Engineers.
- Lord Strathcona's Horse: 22 October 2010.

==== Grande Cache ====
- The Correctional Service of Canada: 17 October 2015.

==== High River ====
- 187 Foothills Squadron Royal Canadian Air Cadets: 22 September 2016.

==== Lethbridge ====
- 429 Transport Squadron, RCAF: 2008.

==== Medicine Hat ====
- South Alberta Light Horse: October 2005.
- CFB Suffield: 23 April 2015.
- British Army Training Unit Suffield: 23 April 2015.

==== Morinville ====
- 1 Service Battalion: September 2011.

==== Okotoks ====
- 187 Squadron Royal Canadian Air Cadets: 24 May 2017.

==== Red Deer ====
- 41 Signal Regiment

==== Rocky Mountain House ====
- 198 Yukon Corps Royal Canadian Sea Cadets: 23 September 2018.

==== St. Albert ====
- Lord Strathcona's Horse (Royal Canadians): 11 June 2011.
- 1 Field Ambulance: 30 July 2023.

==== Strathcona County ====
- Lord Strathcona's Horse (Royal Canadians): 24 August 2013.

==== Vegreville ====
- 41 Combat Engineer Regiment: 29 April 2006.

==== Wetaskiwin ====
- 1 Military Police Regiment: 27 June 2009.

=== British Columbia ===
==== Armstrong ====
- The Royal Canadian Legion (Armstrong Branch 35): 22 June 2019.

==== Chilliwack ====
- 39 Combat Engineer Regiment: 26 October 2013.
- Royal Westminster Regiment: 26 October 2013.
- 39 Service Battalion: 26 October 2013.

==== Comox ====
- HMCS Quadra.
- 19 Wing Comox.

==== Courtenay ====
- CFB Comox: March 1996.
- The Canadian Scottish Regiment (Princess Mary's): October 1996.
- HMCS Quadra: August 2008.

- The Royal Canadian Legion (Courtenay Branch): 1 July 2016.

==== Esquimalt ====
- 3rd Battalion Princess Patricia's Canadian Light Infantry: 16 September 1972.

==== Fort St. John ====
- 2276 Royal Canadian Army Cadet Corps: 10 April 2006.

==== Kamloops ====
- Rocky Mountain Rangers: 19 February 1980.
- CFS Kamloops: 15 May 1984.
- The Royal Canadian Legion (Branch No.52): 18 November 1986.
- The Army, Navy and Air Force Veterans in Canada (Unit 290): 27 February 1990.
- 419 Tactical Fighter Training Squadron, RCAF: 1 July 1993.

- 886 (Kamloops Overlander) Wing: 2009.

==== Kelowna ====
- British Columbia Dragoons: 11 February 1963

==== Maple Ridge ====
- Royal Canadian Legion (Maple Ridge Branch 88).
- The Royal Westminster Regiment.

==== Nanaimo ====
- South Alberta Regiment: April 1941.
- Le Régiment de Hull: May 1943. Le Régiment de Hull was the first French speaking unit to be posted to the West Coast. It so worried the residents that they doubled their police force. The residents and the Regiment soon broke the linguistic barrier and formed a bond of friendship, often playing in softball tournaments and learning French-Canadien folk songs.
- Canadian Scottish Regiment (Princess Mary's): 5 October 1974.
- HMCS Nanaimo, RCN: March 1997.

==== New Westminster ====
- Royal Westminster Regiment, then called the Westminster Regiment: 24 May 1963.
- HMCS Discovery, RCN: 3 October 2010.

==== Parksville ====
- The Royal Canadian Legion (Mount Arrowsmith Branch 49): 19 September 2026.

==== Pitt Meadows ====
- The Royal Westminster Regiment: 22 September 2012.

==== Port Moody ====
- Royal Canadian Legion (Port Moody Branch 119): 16 October 2005.

==== Prince George ====
- The Rocky Mountain Rangers: 21 April 2018.
- The Royal Canadian Army Cadets

==== Qualicum Beach ====
- 19 Mission Support Squadron, RCAF: 7 May 2022.

==== Richmond ====
- 12 (Vancouver) Service Company, then called 12 Service Battalion: 17 April 1993.
- 39 Service Battalion: 13 April 2014.

==== Saanich ====
- 11 (Victoria) Service Company, then called 11 Service Battalion: April 1994.
- 11 (Victoria) Field Ambulance, then called 11 (Victoria) Medical Company: September 1994.
- 39 Service Battalion: 2 May 2014.

==== Sechelt ====
- 2963 Seaforth Highlanders of Canada, RCACC: 29 August 1998.

==== Surrey ====
- HMCS Discovery, RCN: 23 September 2023.

==== Vancouver ====
- HMCS Discovery, RCN: 13 February 1973.
- 15th Field Artillery Regiment, RCA: 12 June 1977.
- Seaforth Highlanders of Canada: 6 December 1977.
- British Columbia Regiment: 26 April 1983.
- 12 (Vancouver) Field Ambulance: 14 April 2007.
- The Seaforth Highlanders of Canada: 16 April 2011.
- Vancouver Police Pipe band: 23 January 2014.

==== Vernon ====
- Vernon Army Cadet Summer Training Centre: 4 August 1979
- British Columbia Dragoons: 10 May 2008

==== Victoria ====
- 3rd Battalion Princess Patricia's Canadian Light Infantry: 15 June 1974
- HMCS Malahat: 1983.
- Maritime Forces Pacific: 5 May 1985.
- 5th (British Columbia) Field Artillery Regiment, RCA: 4 November 1979.
- 2nd Battalion The Queen's Own Rifles of Canada:
- The Canadian Scottish Regiment (Princess Mary's): 6 June 1964
- Royal Roads Military College

=== Manitoba ===
==== Brandon ====
- 2nd Battalion Princess Patricia's Canadian Light Infantry: 22 May 2012.
- CFB Shilo: 22 June 2017.
- 1st Regiment The Royal Canadian Horse Artillery: 11 June 2026.

==== Portage la Prairie ====
- 19 Portage Royal Canadian Army Cadets Corps: 27 May 2025.

==== Winnipeg ====
- 2nd Battalion Princess Patricia's Canadian Light Infantry: 1989.
- HMCS Chippawa: 5 May 1985.
- Royal Winnipeg Rifles: 4 June 1983.
- CFB Winnipeg: October 1992.

=== New Brunswick ===
==== Dorchester ====
- Correctional Service of Canada: 27 July 2015.

==== Fredericton ====
- 2nd Battalion The Royal Canadian Regiment: 2 June 1973.
- 1st Battalion, The Royal New Brunswick Regiment (Carleton and York): 1991.
- Argonuat CSTC: 8 August 2004.

==== Moncton ====
- The Royal Canadian Regiment.
- The 8th Canadian Hussars (Princess Louise's): 20 May 2023.

==== Oromocto ====
- Argonuat CSTC: 1989.

==== Sackville ====
- Argonuat CSTC: 2000.

==== Saint John ====
- 3rd Field Artillery Regiment (The Loyal Company) The Royal Regiment of Canadian Artillery: 13 December 1968.
- The Black Watch (Royal Highland Regiment) of Canada: 18 May 1970.
- 2nd Battalion The Royal Canadian Regiment: 9 July 1983.
- HMCS Brunswicker, RCN: 6 July 1985.
- 1st Battalion The Royal New Brunswick Regiment: 18 September 1993.
- 722 (Saint John) Communication Squadron The Communications and Electronics Branch: 11 June 1994.
- 31 (Saint John) Service Battalion: 24 September 1994.
- 410 City of Saint John Squadron, RCAF: 3 July 2012.
- 161 C.K. Beveridge Squadron, Royal Canadian Air Cadets: 16 September 2017.
- 527 Simonds Squadron, Royal Canadian Air Cadets: 16 September 2017.
- 9 Rodney, Royal Canadian Sea Cadets: 16 September 2017.
- 268 Bras d’Or, Royal Canadian Sea Cadets: 16 September 2017.
- 311 Halifax, Royal Canadian Sea Cadets: 16 September 2017.
- 1691 Saint John, Royal Canadian Army Cadets: 16 September 2017.
- 3034 Blue Mountain Rangers, Royal Canadian Army Cadets: 16 September 2017.
- 1777 Saint John West, Royal Canadian Army Cadets: 16 September 2017.
- 140 Kingston Peninsula, Royal Canadian Army Cadets: 16 September 2017.

- 403 Helicopter Operational Training Squadron, RCAF: 13 June 2022.

==== Sussex ====
- The 8th Canadian Hussars (Princess Louise's): 21 May 2023.

=== Newfoundland and Labrador ===
==== Corner Brook ====
- 2nd Battalion The Royal Newfoundland Regiment: 1974.
- The Royal Newfoundland Constabulary: 20 July 2011.

==== Gander ====
- 103 Search and Rescue Squadron, RCAF: 2 May 2017.

==== St. John's ====
- HMS Newfoundland, RN: 16 May 1944.
- Royal Newfoundland Regiment: 1 July 1963.
- HMCS Cabot, RCN: 24 April 1985.
- HMCS St. John's, RCN: 22 June 1996.
- Royal Canadian Regiment: 19 June 2005.
- 56 Engineer Squadron: 31 October 2009.
- Royal Newfoundland Constabulary: 18 August 2010

=== North West Territories ===
==== Yellowknife ====
- HMCS Yellowknife, RCN: 18 June 1999.

=== Nova Scotia ===
==== Annapolis Royal ====
- CSTC HMCS Acadia: 2004.

==== Halifax ====
- 78th Highlanders: 1998. (Exercised Annually)
- The Princess Louise Fusiliers.
- Maritime Forces Atlantic.
- The Royal Canadian Regiment.
- HMCS Scotian, RCN: 24 September 2023.

==== Kentville ====
- Land Force Atlantic Area Training Centre Aldershot: 14 October 2012.

==== Sydney ====
- The Cape Breton Highlanders: 1996.
- 29 Sydney Kiwanis and Band, Royal Canadian Air Cadets: 5 October 2018.
- 45 A/M Edwards, Royal Canadian Air Cadets: 5 October 2018.
- 562 Cabot, Royal Canadian Air Cadets: 5 October 2018.
- 129 Caribou, Royal Canadian Sea Cadets: 5 October 2018.
- 587 Whitney Pier, Royal Canadian Air Cadets: 5 October 2018.
- 591 Dunlap, Royal Canadian Air Cadets: 5 October 2018.
- 86 Dreadnought, Royal Canadian Sea Cadets: 5 October 2018.
- 693 Sydney Rotary, Royal Canadian Air Cadets: 5 October 2018.
- 3060 Coriano Ridge, Royal Canadian Army Cadets: 5 October 2018.
- 2878 Cape Breton Highlanders, Royal Canadian Army Cadets: 5 October 2018.
- 2 Sydney, Royal Canadian Sea Cadets: 5 October 2018.
- 70 New Waterford, Royal Canadian Sea Cadets: 5 October 2018.

==== Yarmouth ====
- 84th Independent Field Battery, RCA: 29 September 2018.

=== Ontario ===
==== Aurora ====
- 142 St. Andrew's College Highland Cadet Corps Royal Canadian Army Cadets: 2005.

==== Barrie ====
- CFB Borden: 5 June 2016.

==== Belleville ====
- The Hastings and Prince Edward Regiment: 17 May 1964.
- 8 Wing CFB Trenton: 1978.
- RCSCC Quinte 58: 2013.

==== Brampton ====
- The Lorne Scots Regiment : 1969.

==== Brantford ====
- 56th Field Artillery Regiment, RCA: 1 October 1966.
- The Royal Canadian Sea Cadets (Admiral Nelles Cadet Corps): 5 October 2024.
- The Royal Canadian Air Cadets (104 Starfighter Squadron): 5 October 2024.

==== Brockville ====
- The Brockville Rifles: 1 October 2016.

==== Cobourg ====
- Royal Canadian Horse Artillery: 1987.

==== Collingwood ====
- The Canadian Forces Military Police Academy: 21 June 2014.

==== Cumberland ====
- 3018 Orleans Army Cadet Corps Royal Canadian Army Cadets: 1997.

==== Dufferin County ====
- The Lorne Scots Regiment : 1981.

==== Durham ====
- The Ontario Regiment: 1979

==== Elgin County ====
- 31 Combat Engineer Regiment: 19 April 2008.

==== Elliot Lake ====
- 696 Air Cadet Squadron Royal Canadian Air Cadets: 26 May 2019.

==== Guelph ====
- 11th Field Regiment, RCA: 1966.

==== Halton Hills ====
- The Lorne Scots Regiment : 1987.

==== Hamilton ====
- HMCS Star, RCN
- Argyll and Sutherland Highlanders of Canada
- Royal Hamilton Light Infantry
- 705 (Hamilton) Communication Squadron: 25 July 1978.
- 31 Signal Regiment: 21 April 2012.

==== Kenora ====
- 116 Independent Field Battery, RCA: 1985.

==== Kingston ====
- Royal Military College of Canada: 7 October 1976. (Freedom Exercised on 6 May 2012 and 5 May 2013)
- Princess of Wales' Own Regiment: 1963. (Exercised on 4 May 2013)
- 2nd Regiment, Royal Canadian Horse Artillery: 1983. (Exercised in 1996 and 26 May 2012)
- Communications and Electronics Branch: 31 August 2003.
- 1st Canadian Signal Regiment: 21 June 1975
- The Correctional Service of Canada: 31 May 2015.
- 58 A/C A. Dwight Ross GC CBE CD, Royal Canadian Air Cadets: 28 May 2016.

==== London ====
- 1st Battalion The Royal Canadian Regiment: 1980.
- HMCS Prevost, RCN: 31 October 1998.

==== Markham ====
- Button's Troop The Governor General's Horse Guards: 2 October 2010.
- 351 Silver Star Royal Canadian Air Cadets Squadron: 27 May 2012.
- 883 Air Commodore Leonard Birchall Royal Canadian Air Cadets Squadron: 27 May 2012.

==== Meaford ====
- The 4th Canadian Division Training Centre: 18 July 2025.

==== Milton ====
- The Lorne Scots Regiment : 2009.

==== Mississauga ====
- The Lorne Scots Regiment : 2 July 2014.
- The Toronto Scottish Regiment: 20 September 2014.

==== North Bay ====
- CFB North Bay: 20 October 2026.

==== Oakville ====
- The Lorne Scots Regiment : 1984.

==== Orillia ====
- 99 Lynx Air Cadet Squadron Royal Canadian Air Cadets: 2005.
- The Royal Canadian Legion (Branch 34): 23 May 2026.

==== Oshawa ====
- The Ontario Regiment: 1966.

==== Ottawa ====
- 14th Battalion of Kingston: 1894.
- 1st Battalion The Royal Canadian Regiment: 1953.
- 2nd Battalion The Canadian Guards: 1964.
- 30th Field Artillery Regiment, RCA: 1968.
- The Cameron Highlanders of Ottawa: 24 May 1969.
- Governor General's Foot Guards: 1972.
- 3rd Field Engineer Squadron: 1977.
- 763 (Ottawa) Communications Regiment: 1978.
- The Canadian Grenadier Guards: 1979.
- HMCS Carleton, RCN: 1980.
- 4th Princess Louise Dragoon Guards: 1981.
- 28th Service Battalion: 1981.
- Princess Patricia's Canadian Light Infantry: 1985.
- Royal Canadian Sea Cadet Corps "Falkland": 1995.
- HMCS Ottawa, RCN: 1996.
- 3rd Battalion, The Royal Canadian Regiment: 1999.
- 26/28 Service Battalion: 2009.
- 33 Canadian Brigade Group: 2013.
- 7 Intelligence Company: 5 June 2016.
- 51 Squadron Aviation and Space Museum (RCAC): 19 June 2016.

==== Petawawa ====
- The Royal Canadian Dragoons: 15 June 2019.

==== Quinte West ====
- 413 Wing RCAF Association: 7 April 2024.

==== Rideau Lakes ====
- Canadian Forces School of Communications and Electronics: 2008.

==== Sault Ste. Marie ====
- 49th Field Artillery Regiment, RCA: 1 July 1967.
- 31 Service Battalion: 26 September 1987.
- 2310 (Sault Ste. Marie) Squadron Royal Canadian Army Cadets: 1998.

==== Sioux Lookout ====
- CFS Sioux Lookout: July 1982.

==== Sudbury ====
- 2nd Battalion, Irish Regiment of Canada: 1983 (exercised 2005, 9 May 2015, and 6 September 2025).

==== Thunder Bay ====
- HMCS Griffon, RCN: 4 November 2018.
- 18 Field Ambulance, RCMS: 4 November 2018.
- The Lake Superior Scottish Regiment: 4 November 2018.

==== Timmins ====
- The Algonquin Regiment (Northern Pioneers): 22 September 1977 (exercised on 22 September 2012)

==== Toronto ====
- 3rd Battalion The Queen's Own Rifles of Canada: 1967.
- The Royal Regiment of Canada: 1962.
- The 48th Highlanders of Canada: 1966.
- The Royal Regiment of Canadian Artillery: 1966.
- 7th Toronto Regiment, RCA: May 1966
- The Queen's York Rangers: 1975.
- 709 (Toronto) Communications Regiment Signals Communications and Electronics Branch: 1978.
- The Toronto Scottish Regiment (Queen Elizabeth the Queen Mother's Own): 1982.
- 400 Tactical Helicopter Squadron, RCAF: 1982.
- HMCS Toronto: 1983.
- HMCS York: 1983.
- 2nd Field Engineer Regiment: 1984.
- 32 Canadian Brigade Group: 1998.
- The Royal Canadian Dragoons: 2000.
- 32 Signal Regiment, Royal Canadian Corps of Signals: 2017.

==== Trenton ====
- Trenton Air Cadet Summer Training Centre.
- 704 Airforce City Royal Canadian Air Cadets Squadron.
- 8 Wing CFB Trenton: September 1967.

==== Waterloo ====
- 31 Combat Engineer Regiment

==== Westport ====
- The Canadian Forces School of Communications and Electronics: 2008.

==== Whitchurch–Stouffville ====
- The Governor General's Horse Guards: 16 June 2012.

==== Windsor ====
- The Windsor Regiment: 1940.
- 31 Service Battalion: 10 June 2017.
- HMCS Hunter, RCN: 2023.

=== Prince Edward Island ===
==== Charlottetown ====
- HMCS Charlottetown, RCN: 2015.
- The Royal Canadian Regiment.
- PEI Corps Royal Canadian Sea Cadets: 15 September 2018.

==== Summerside ====
- 85 Summerside Corps Royal Canadian Sea Cadets: 15 September 2018.

=== Quebec ===
==== Beaupré ====
- 35 Combat Engineer Regiment: 4 May 2014.

==== Gatineau ====
- Le Régiment de Hull.

==== Granby ====
- Les Fusiliers de Sherbrooke

==== Hampstead ====
- The Royal Montreal Regiment: 2008.
- The Canadian Grenadier Guards: 1 November 2023.

==== Hull ====
- The Régiment de Hull: May 1943.

==== Huntingdon ====
- The Black Watch (Royal Highland Regiment) of Canada: 1998.

==== Matane ====
- Les Fusiliers du S^{t}-Laurent: 1985.

==== Mont-Joli ====
- Les Fusiliers du S^{t}-Laurent: 22 August 2010.

==== Montreal ====
- HMCS Donnacona, RCN: 1985.
- Canadian Grenadier Guards
- Le Régiment de Maisonneuve
- 3rd Field Engineer Regiment (34 CER)
- The Royal Canadian Hussars
- The Black Watch (Royal Highland Regiment) of Canada: August 1992.
- The Royal Montreal Regiment: 2003.
- 438 Tactical Helicopter Squadron
- HMCS Montreal

==== Ormstown ====
- The Black Watch (Royal Highland Regiment) of Canada: 1997.

==== Port-Cartier ====
- The Correctional Service of Canada: 19 September 2018.

==== Pointe-Claire ====
- The Royal Montreal Regiment: 1984.

==== Quebec City ====
- Royal 22^{e} Régiment: 1975 (Exercised 3 July 2006).
- HMCS Montcalm, RCN: 6 May 1995.
- 5^{e} Régiment d'artillerie légère du Canada: 25 September 2004.

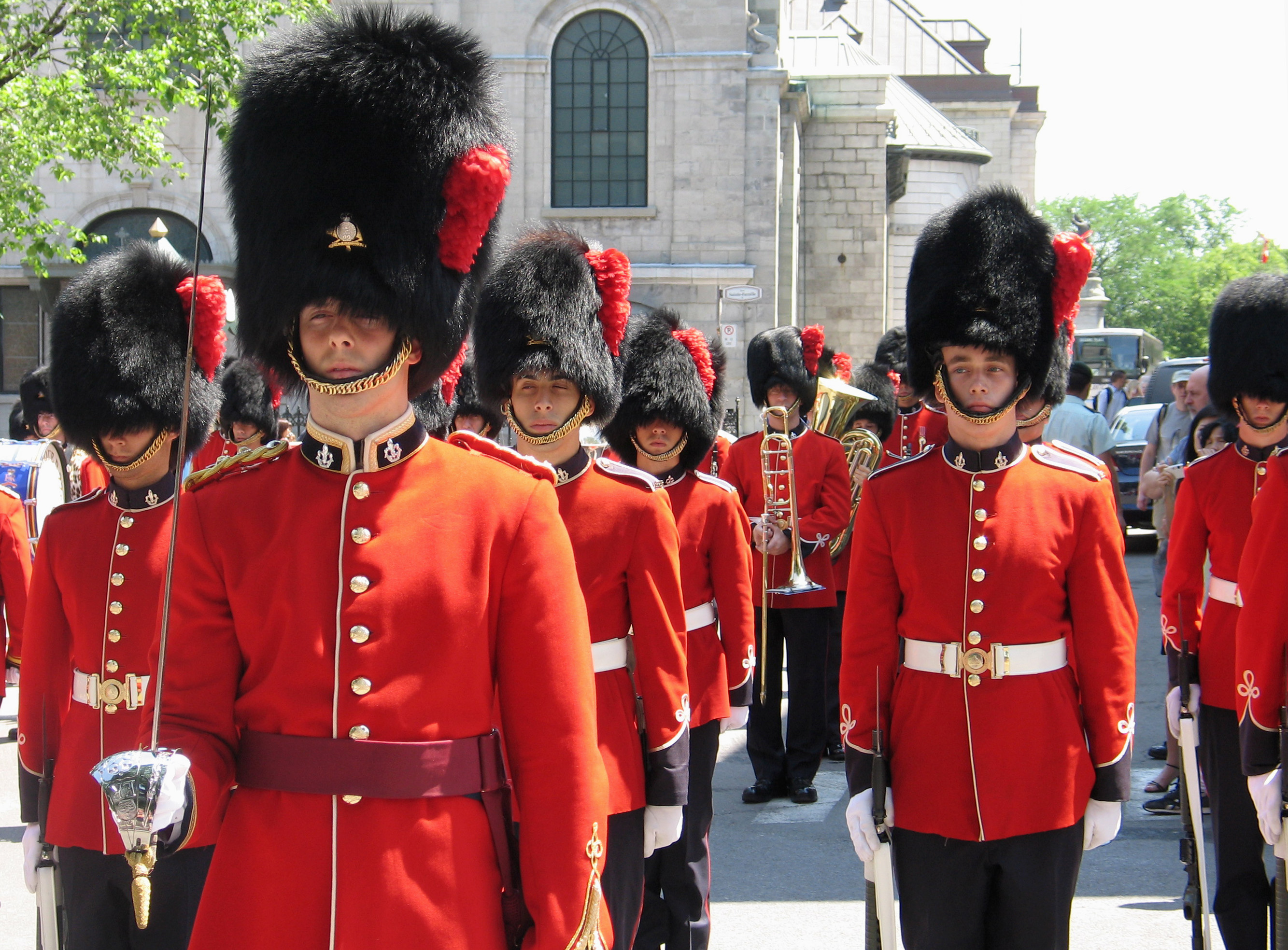
Soldiers from the Royal 22^{e} Régiment exercising the Freedom of the City in front of Quebec City's City Hall, on 3 July 2006.

==== Rivière-du-Loup ====
- Les Fusiliers du S^{t}-Laurent: 1991.

==== Rimouski ====
- Les Fusiliers du S^{t}-Laurent: 1984.

==== Saint-Jean-sur-Richelieu ====
- Royal Military College Saint-Jean: 1 October 1977. (Exercised 1992, 1995, and 22 April 2012)

==== Sayabec ====
- Les Fusiliers du S^{t}-Laurent.

==== Sherbrooke ====
- Les Fusiliers de Sherbrooke
- Sherbrooke Hussars

==== Verdun ====
- The Black Watch (Royal Highland Regiment) of Canada: Fall 1999.

==== Westmount ====
- The Royal Montreal Regiment: 1954.
- 2nd Field Regiment, RCA: 24 October 2015.
- 34 Signal Regiment 34 Canadian Brigade Group.

=== Saskatchewan ===
==== Moose Jaw ====
- 15 Wing Moose Jaw: 1978.

==== Prince Albert ====
- The Saskatchewan Federal Penitentiary of the Correctional Service of Canada: 18 September 2017.

==== Regina ====
- HMCS Queen, RCN: 1978.
- 734 Communication Squadron, Royal Canadian Corps of Signals: 1978.
- HMCS Regina, RCN: 1996.
- Royal Regina Rifles: 2 June 2007.
- Royal Canadian Mounted Police: 25 May 2007.
- 38 Service Battalion: 12 September 2015.
- 10 Field Artillery Regiment: 12 September 2015.
- 16 Field Ambulance: 12 September 2015.
- 15 Wing Moose Jaw: 12 September 2015.
- 38 Signal Regiment Detachment Regina: 12 September 2015.

==== Saskatoon ====
- HMCS Unicorn, RCN: 1983.

==== Yorkton ====
- 10th Field Artillery Regiment, RCA: 18 May 1985

=== Yukon ===
==== Dawson City ====
- The Canadian Rangers: 22 August 2022.

==== Whitehorse ====
- Whitehorse Cadet Summer Training Centre: 24 July 2009.

== France ==
=== Arras ===
- The Welsh Guards: 1 September 2024.

=== Erquinghem-Lys ===
- The Duke of Wellington's Regiment: 12 November 2005.

=== Moreuil ===
- Lord Strathcona's Horse (Royal Canadians): 31 March 2018.

=== Vis-en-Artois ===
- The Cameron Highlanders of Ottawa (Duke of Edinburgh's Own): 8 May 2019.

== Germany ==
=== Bergen ===
- 111 Provost Company Royal Military Police

=== Berlin (Spandau) ===
- 7 Flight Army Air Corps: 22 October 1982.
- The Queen's Lancashire Regiment: 16 August 1993.

=== Celle ===
- 14 Signal Regiment: 10 July 1987.

=== Hamelin ===
- The Corps of Royal Engineers: 3 June 1977.

=== Hamm ===
- 617 Tank Transporter Unit The Royal Corps of Transport: 6 September 1974.

=== Paderborn ===
- 39th Regiment, Royal Artillery: 15 March 1980.
- Princess of Wales’s Royal Regiment 3 July 2018

=== Rheda-Wiedenbrück ===
- 26th Regiment, Royal Artillery: 10 August 2017.

=== Stadt Soest ===
- 3 Regiment Army Air Corps: 8 May 1993.

=== Tiergarten ===
- The Royal Military Police: 5 October 1990.

=== Xanten ===
- 101 Provost Company Royal Military Police: 15 March 1982.

== Italy ==
=== Ortona ===
- The Royal 22nd Regiment: 14 April 1993.

== Malawi ==
=== Zomba ===
- Changalume Barracks: 31 March 2017.

== New Zealand ==
=== Auckland Region ===
==== Auckland ====
- Auckland Regiment (Countess of Ranfurly's own):19 April 1953
- 3rd (Auckland (Countess of Ranfurly's own) and Northland) Battalion, Royal New Zealand Infantry Regiment: 9 March 1966

==== Howick ====
- 4 Signal Squadron, Royal New Zealand Corps of Signals 14 August 1982

==== Papakura ====
- Papakura Military Camp: 6 December 1964
- 11(A) Battery, 1st Field Regiment, Royal New Zealand Artillery: 9 September 1995

==== Takapuna ====
- Land Forces Command: 9 February 1982

=== Bay of Plenty ===
==== Rotorua ====
- Hauraki Regiment: 26 January 1963
- 6th (Hauraki) Battalion, Royal New Zealand Infantry Regiment: February 1966

==== Tauranga ====
- 6th (Hauraki) Battalion, Royal New Zealand Infantry Regiment: 20 September 1969

=== Canterbury ===
==== Akaroa ====
- Ready Reaction Force Engineer Squadron: 25 October 1974

==== Ashburton ====
- 2nd (Canterbury, and Nelson-Marlborough and West Coast) Battalion, Royal New Zealand Infantry Regiment: 13 December 1982

==== Christchurch ====
- Canterbury Regiment: 15 November 1959
- 2nd (Canterbury, and Nelson-Marlborough and West Coast) Battalion, Royal New Zealand Infantry Regiment: 17 January 1966

==== Lyttleton ====
- 3 Field Troop, Royal New Zealand Engineers: 10 December 1994

==== Rolleston ====
- Burnham Military Camp: 12 April 2005

==== Timaru ====
- Canterbury Regiment: 5 April 1959
- 2nd (Canterbury, and Nelson-Marlborough and West Coast) Battalion, Royal New Zealand Infantry Regiment: 17 January 1966

=== Gisborne District ===
==== Gisborne ====
- HMNZS Manawanui, RNZN: 28 November 2020.
- 7th (Wellington (City of Wellington's Own) and Hawke's Bay) Battalion, Royal New Zealand Infantry Regiment: 23 February 1979

=== Hawke's Bay ===
==== Hastings ====
- Queen Alexandra's Mounted Rifles: 29 August 1965
- 4th Armoured Regiment (Wellington East Coast): 7 September 1958

==== Napier ====
- Hawke's Bay Regiment: 17 March 1952
- 7th (Wellington (City of Wellington's Own) and Hawke's Bay) Battalion, Royal New Zealand Infantry Regiment: 30 November 1964

=== Manawatu-Wanganui ===
==== Feilding ====
- 2nd Health Support Battalion, Royal New Zealand Army Medical Corps: 11 November 2006

==== Foxton ====
- 21 Supply Company, 2nd Combat Service Support Battalion: 11 December 2010

==== Dannevirke ====
- 1st Battalion, Royal New Zealand Infantry Regiment: 7 October 2016

==== Levin ====
- The Corps of Royal New Zealand Engineers: 7 February 1959.

==== Palmerston North ====
- Linton Military Camp: 12 October 1956

==== Raetihi ====
- 4th Logistic Battalion: 18 February 1995

==== Taihape ====
- Royal New Zealand Electrical and Mechanical Engineers: 14 December 1973

==== Taumarunui ====
- Royal New Zealand Service Corps: 8 October 1966

==== Wanganui ====
- Wellington West Coast and Taranaki Regiment: 24 January 1961
- 5th (Wellington West Coast and Taranaki) Battalion, Royal New Zealand Infantry Regiment: 9 November 1964
- Queen Alexandra's Mounted Rifles: 30 September 1983

=== Marlborough ===
==== Blenheim ====
- 2nd (Canterbury, and Nelson-Marlborough and West Coast) Battalion, Royal New Zealand Infantry Regiment: 28 August 1990

=== Nelson ===
==== Nelson ====
- 1st Battalion Nelson, Marlborough, West Coast Regiment: 28 September 1958.
- 2nd (Canterbury, and Nelson-Marlborough and West Coast) Battalion, Royal New Zealand Infantry Regiment: 29 November 1969

=== Northland ===
==== Kaitaia ====
- Northland Regiment: 25 March 1955

==== Whangarei ====
- 3rd (Auckland (Countess of Ranfurly's own) and Northland) Battalion, Royal New Zealand Infantry Regiment: 8 November 1966

=== Otago ===
==== Dunedin ====
- Otago and Southland Regiment: 21 January 1961
- 4th (Otago and Southland) Battalion, Royal New Zealand Infantry Regiment: 19 October 1964
- 2nd Squadron, New Zealand Scottish Regiment: 15 March 1977
- 2nd/4th Battalion, Royal New Zealand Infantry Regiment: 27 September 2016.

=== Southland ===
==== Invercargil ====
- Otago and Southland Regiment: 22 January 1959
- 4th (Otago and Southland) Battalion, Royal New Zealand Infantry Regiment: 27 August 1964

=== Taranaki ===
==== Hawera ====
- 5th (Wellington West Coast and Taranaki) Battalion, Royal New Zealand Infantry Regiment: 31 January 1972

==== New Plymouth ====
- Wellington West Coast and Taranaki Regiment: 28 February 1960
- 5th (Wellington West Coast and Taranaki) Battalion, Royal New Zealand Infantry Regiment: 16 November 1964
- 5th/7th Battalion, Royal New Zealand Infantry Regiment
- 8 (City of New Plymouth) Squadron, New Zealand Air Training Corps
- City of New Plymouth Unit, New Zealand Cadet Corps: 21 October 2018

==== Stratford ====
- 5th (Wellington West Coast and Taranaki) Battalion, Royal New Zealand Infantry Regiment: 9 July 1996

=== Waikato ===
==== Hamilton, New Zealand ====
- Waikato Mounted Rifles: 2 October 1960
- 4th Medium Regiment, Royal New Zealand Artillery: 2 October 1960
- 2nd Armoured Squadron, Royal New Zealand Armoured Corps: October 1964
- Queen Alexandra's Mounted Rifles: 3 September 1971

==== Ngaruawahia ====
- Hopuhopu Camp: 7 December 1963

==== Paeroa ====
- 6th (Hauraki) Battalion, Royal New Zealand Infantry Regiment: 12 February 1983

==== Raglan ====
- 16th Field Regiment, Royal New Zealand Artillery: 25 April 1969

==== Taupo ====
- Regular Force Cadet School: 31 January 1970
- New Zealand Officer Cadet Corps: 7 March 1998

==== Te Awamutu ====
- 1st Field Ambulance, Royal New Zealand Army Medical Corps: 20 December 1993
- 1st Health Company, Royal New Zealand Army Medical Corps: 30 September 2003

==== Thames ====
- New Zealand Special Air Service: 27 September 1969
- No. 37 (Thames) Squadron Air Training Corps: 13 December 2025

==== Tokoroa ====
- 6th (Hauraki) Battalion, Royal New Zealand Infantry Regiment: 20 March 1990

=== Wellington Region ===
==== Featherston ====
- 5th/7th Battalion, Royal New Zealand Infantry Regiment: 1 December 2018

==== Wellington ====
- Wellington Regiment (City of Wellington's Own): 14 October 1938.
- 7th (Wellington (City of Wellington's Own) and Hawke's Bay) Battalion, Royal New Zealand Infantry Regiment: 3 November 1969.
- 22 (D) Battery, 2nd Field Regiment, Royal New Zealand Artillery: 11 December 1981.
- HMAS Canberra, RAN: 8 June 2025.

==== Upper Hutt ====
- Trentham Military Camp: 31 October 1951

=== West Coast ===
==== Greymouth ====
- 2nd (Canterbury, and Nelson-Marlborough and West Coast) Battalion, Royal New Zealand Infantry Regiment: 3 June 1988

== Rhodesia ==
=== Bulawayo ===
- Rhodesian African Rifles: 5 September 1964.
- Royal Rhodesia Regiment: 5 September 1964.

=== Salisbury ===
- Rhodesia Regiment: July 1968
- Rhodesian Air Force: 25 May 1971.
- Rhodesian Light Infantry: 25 July 1975.

== South Africa ==
=== Barberton ===
- The South African Irish Regiment: 2009.
- The Transvaal Scottish Regiment: 2009.
- The Witwatersrand Rifles Regiment: 2009.
- The Regiment Botha: 2009.

=== Cape Town ===
- The Cape Town Highlanders Regiment: 1967.
- The Cape Town Rifles: 1967.

=== Mahikeng ===
- South African Navy: 15 September 2012.

=== Makhanda (formerly Grahamstown) ===
- The First City Regiment: 4 September 1962.
- The 6 South African Infantry Battalion: 31 March 1967.

=== Johannesburg ===
- The Transvaal Scottish Regiment: 13 December 1952.
- The Witwatersrand Rifles Regiment: 24 April 1954.
- The Rand Light Infantry: 27 September 1955.
- The Light Horse Regiment: 5 September 1959.
- The Transvaal Horse Artillery: 17 March 1963.
- SAS Rand, SAN: 1963.
- The South African Irish Regiment: 19 November 1966.
- The Regiment Paul Kruger: 11 October 1969.
- The Johannesburg Regiment: 27 February 1971.
- The 2 Squadron, SAAF: 16 March 1984.
- 21 South African Infantry Battalion: 24 June 1986.
- Area Military Health Unit Gauteng South African Military Health Service: 24 April 1990.
- 6 Light Anti-Aircraft Regiment: 31 October 2002.

=== Pretoria ===
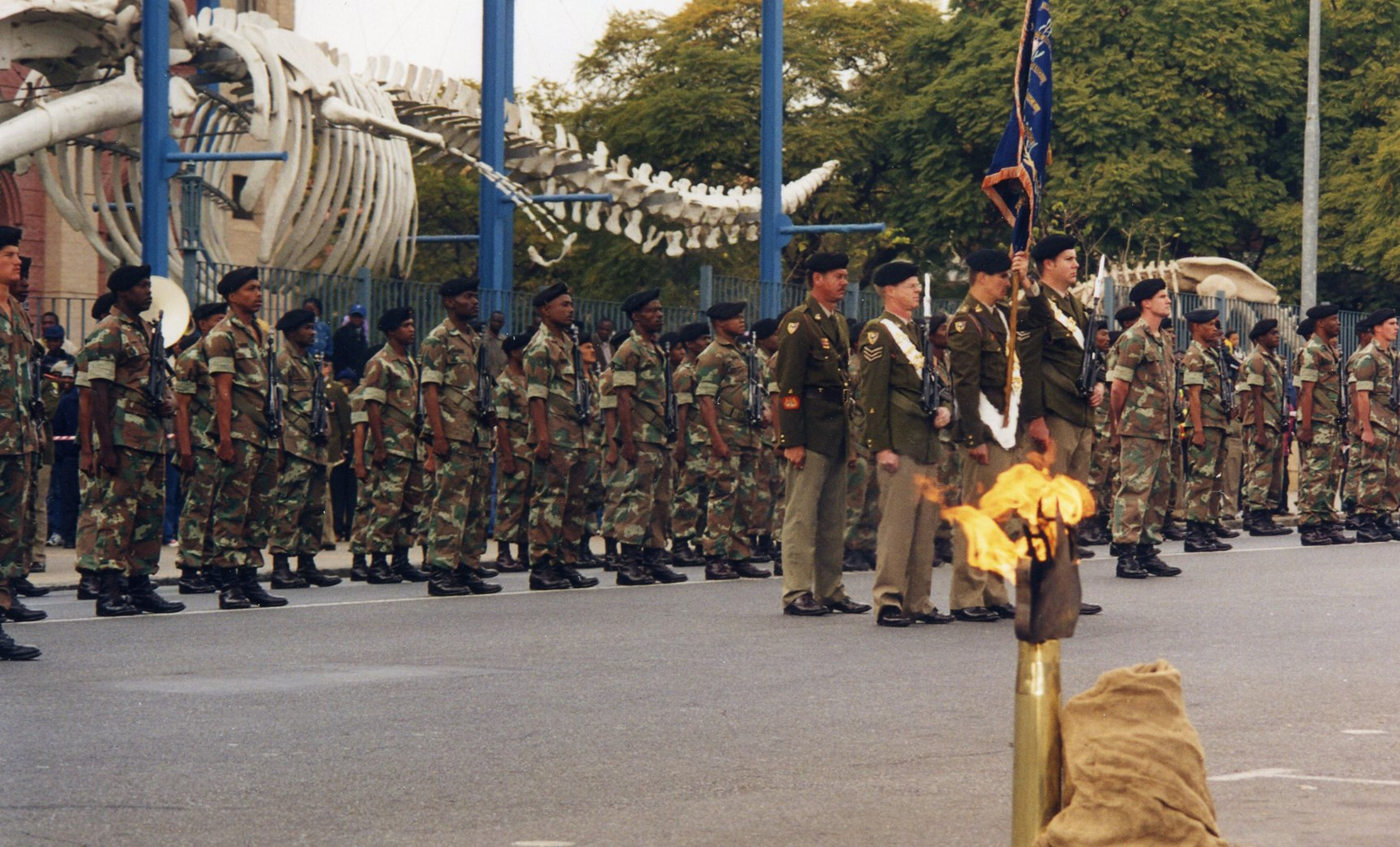
Pretoria Armour Regiment receiving freedom of the city of the capital, Pretoria in 2003

- The Pretoria Armour Regiment: 2003.

== United Kingdom ==
=== British Overseas Territories ===
==== Bermuda ====
===== Hamilton =====
- The Royal Bermuda Regiment: 13 November 2015.

==== Falkland Islands ====
- The Royal Marines: 8 December 1976.
- The British Army: 14 June 2012.
- The Royal Navy: 14 June 2012.
- The Royal Air Force: 14 June 2012.
- The Falkland Islands Defence Force: 14 June 2012.

==== Gibraltar ====
- The Royal Gibraltar Regiment: 25 September 1971.
- The Corps of Royal Engineers: 6 March 1972.
- The Royal Regiment of Artillery: 29 April 1981.
- HMS Calpe, RN: 27 April 1991.
- The Royal Marines: 28 October 1996.
- The Royal Navy: 4 August 2004.
- The Royal Gibraltar Police: 26 September 2015.
- 1st Battalion The Royal Anglian Regiment: 26 November 2016.
- RAF Gibraltar: 2 April 2018.

=== Crown dependencies ===
==== Bailiwick of Guernsey ====
- 201 Squadron, RAF: 1994.

==== Bailiwick of Jersey ====
- The Royal Hampshire Regiment: 9 May 1992.

==== Isle of Man ====
===== Douglas =====
- RAF Jurby: 7 July 1955.
- Douglas Lifeboat, RNLI: 27 March 2025.

===== Ramsey =====
- HMS Ramsey, RN: 24 April 2010.

=== England ===
==== Abingdon ====
- RAF Abingdon: 1955.
- The Royal Berkshire Regiment: 1955.
- The Duke of Edinburgh's Royal Regiment: 1970.
- 12 Regiment, RLC: 8 December 2010.

==== Albrighton ====
- RAF Cosford: 1998.

==== Aldeburgh ====
- 3 Regiment Army Air Corps: 23 June 2012.

==== Aldershot ====
- The Hampshire Regiment: 11 September 1945.
- The Canadian Army Overseas: 26 September 1945.

- The Parachute Regiment: 1957.
- The Army Physical Training Corps: 1960.
- The Corps of Royal Engineers: 20 May 1965.
- The Army Catering Corps: 1971.
- The Queen Alexandra's Royal Army Nursing Corps: 27 June 1973.
- The Royal Army Medical Corps: 27 June 1973.
- The Royal Army Dental Corps: 27 June 1973.
- 10 Queen's Own Gurkha Logistic Regiment, RLC: 12 March 2016.

==== Amber Valley ====
- The Mercian Regiment: 26 January 2010.

==== Amesbury ====
- MoD Boscombe Down: 8 April 2018.

==== Appleby-in-Westmorland ====
- 2nd Battalion The Duke of Lancaster's Regiment: 18 July 2017.

==== Arundel ====
- The Royal Sussex Regiment: 1954.

==== Ashford ====
- The Intelligence Corps: 16 May 1979
- The Queen's Regiment: 13 June 1987
- The Princess of Wales's Royal Regiment: 9 September 1992
- 133 Field Company REME (V): 7 May 2009

==== Aylesbury Vale ====
- RAF Halton: October 1956.

==== Barking and Dagenham ====
- The Royal Anglian Regiment: February 2010.

==== Barnet ====
- HMS Musketeer, RN: 20 December 1941. (Awarded by the East Barnet Urban District Council)
- HMS Cromer, RN: 14 March 1942. (Awarded by the East Barnet Urban District Council)
- HMS Fantome, RN: 28 March 1942. (Awarded by the Friern Barnet Urban District Council)
- The Queen's Regiment: 16 April 1970.
- 240 (Hertfordshire) Squadron Royal Corps of Transport (Volunteers): 21 October 1979.
- "B" Company 6/7 (Volunteer) Battalion Queen's Regiment: 1979.
- 3 Company 10th (Volunteer) Battalion Parachute Regiment: 1979.
- The Corps of Royal Engineers: 24 July 1982.
- RAF Hendon: 29 July 1986.
- Royal Logistic Corps, Postal and Courier Services: 19 April 1994.
- The Princess of Wales's Royal Regiment: 23 February 1998.

- The Royal Air Force Museum: 26 October 2018.

==== Barnoldswick ====
- The Yorkshire Regiment: 8 September 2013.

==== Barnsley ====
- The Light Dragoons
- The Yorkshire Regiment

==== Barnstaple ====
- The Commando Logistic Regiment, RM: 1 August 2018.

==== Barrow-in-Furness ====
- The Royal Navy Submarine Service: 11 June 2001.
- The Duke of Lancaster's Regiment.

==== Basildon ====
- The Royal Anglian Regiment: 9 June 2011.

==== Basingstoke ====
- The Royal Hampshire Regiment: 16 July 1966.
- RAF Odiham: 20 July 1968.
- The Royal Army Ordnance Corps Ammunition Depot Bramley: 29 March 1974.

==== Bath ====
- Royal Navy: 5 October 2000 Freedom of the City Granted to Royal Navy
- 21st Signal Regiment (Air Support): November 2011

==== Battersea ====
- 4th Battalion The Queen's Royal Surrey Regiment (TA): 1964.

==== Bedale ====
- RAF Leeming: 5 August 2022.

==== Bedford ====
- Bedfordshire and Hertfordshire Regiment: November 1955
- RAF Cardington: 16 July 1959.
- 287 Regiment Royal Artillery: 5 May 1963.
- 1st Battalion Royal Anglian Regiment: 1980.
- 201 (Hertfordshire and Bedfordshire Yeomanry) Battery Royal Artillery (Volunteers): 3 May 1986.
- RAF Henlow: 26 September 1992.
- 774th USAF Airbase Group: 15 December 1994.
- 134 (Bedford) Squadron Air Training Corps: 1 August 1999.
- United Kingdom Strategic Command: 22 March 2024.

==== Berwick-upon-Tweed ====
- The King's Own Scottish Borderers: 7 August 1947.
- Coldstream Guards: 25 July 2000.

==== Bethnal Green ====
- HMS Crane, RN: 1942.
- 114 (1st London) Army Engineer Regiment (TA): 27 April 1961.

==== Bexley ====
- 17th Depot Regiment Royal Artillery
- 265 Support Squadron Kent and Sharpshooters Yeomanry: May 2010.

==== Beverley ====
- RAF Leconfield: 2 May 1968.

==== Bicester ====
- 1 Regiment, RLC: 21 July 2018.

==== Birkenhead ====
- 4th Battalion The Cheshire Regiment: 1960.
- The Royal Army Service Corps: 1 May 1965.

==== Birmingham ====
- Royal Warwickshire Regiment: 1946.
- Grenadier Guards
- Coldstream Guards
- Scots Guards
- Welsh Guards
- Irish Guards
- Special Air Service
- 35 (South Midlands) Signal Regiment Royal Corps of Signals (TA): 12 September 1970.
- The Royal Regiment of Fusiliers: 7 May 1975.
- HMS Birmingham, RN: 11 May 1978.
- The Queen's Own Hussars: 4 October 1983.
- The Royal Marines: 16 March 2017.
- HMS Forward, RNR.
- HMS Daring, RN.
- RAF Cosford: 19 May 2018.

==== Blackburn with Darwen ====
- The East Lancashire Regiment: 5 February 1948.
- The Lancashire Regiment: 6 November 1958.
- The Queen's Lancashire Regiment: 25 March 1970.
- The Duke of Lancaster's Regiment: 1 July 2006.

==== Blackpool ====
- R (Blackpool) Battery 288 (2nd West Lancashire) Light Anti-Aircraft Regiment Royal Artillery (TA): 1961.
- HMS Penelope, RN: 1990.
- The 12th Regiment Royal Artillery: 9 July 2005.
- The Duke of Lancaster's Regiment: July 2017.

==== Blandford Forum ====
- Queen's Gurkha Signals: 11 September 2005.

==== Bolton ====
- 253rd Regiment Royal Artillery (TA): 18 April 1964.
- 5th Battalion Loyal Regiment (North Lancashire) (TA): 18 April 1964.
- HMS Dido, RN: 14 April 1973.
- 216 (The Bolton Artillery) Battery 103rd (Lancashire Artillery Volunteers) Regiment Royal Artillery: 18 May 1994.
- 1st Battalion The Duke of Lancaster's Regiment: 14 March 2009.

==== Bordon ====
- The Royal Electrical and Mechanical Engineers: 27 June 2015.

==== Boroughbridge ====
- 9 Regiment Army Air Corps: 2 May 1992.
- 6 Regiment Royal Logistic Corps: 7 May 2018.

==== Boston ====
- RAF Coningsby: 16 May 1963.

==== Bournemouth ====
- The Royal Hampshire Regiment: 13 September 1945.

==== Bracknell Forest ====
- Royal Military Academy Sandhurst: 13 July 1997.

==== Bradford ====
- The 70th (West Riding) Royal Field Regiment Royal Artillery (TA): 5 September 1945.
- The Duke of Wellington's Regiment: 26 April 1996.
- The Yorkshire Regiment: 25 June 2010.

==== Brampton ====
- RAF Spadeadam: 18 June 2017.

==== Brentford and Chiswick ====
- 264th Field Regiment Royal Artillery: 5 May 1951.
- 917th Company Royal Army Service Corps: 5 May 1951.
- 21st A A (Mixed) Signal Squadron, Royal Corps of Signals (TA): 5 May 1951.
- 44th (Home Counties) Infantry Division Signals Regiment, Royal Corps of Signals (TA): 5 May 1951.
- 53rd Squadron, Royal Signals Army Cadet Force: 5 May 1951.

==== Brentwood ====
- 124 (Essex) Transport Squadron, RLC: 2015.

==== Bridgnorth ====
- RAF Bridgnorth: 12 April 1950.

==== Brighton and Hove ====
- The Royal Sussex Regiment: 27 October 1944 (Borough of Brighton).
- The Queen's Regiment: 31 December 1966 (Borough of Brighton).

- The Princess of Wales’s Royal Regiment: 1996.

==== Bristol ====
- The Rifles: 2015.
- 39 Signal Regiment: 2019.
- HMS Prince of Wales, RN: 12 June 2023.

==== Brixham ====
- 1st Battalion The Rifles: 2008.

==== Bromley ====
- RAF Biggin Hill: 5 October 1980.

==== Bromsgrove ====
- The Mercian Regiment: 20 January 2011.

==== Broxbourne ====
- The Royal Anglian Regiment: 2 July 2017.

==== Broxtowe ====
- 170 (Infrastructure Support) Engineer group Royal Engineers: 2010.

==== Burghfield ====
- The Royal British Legion: 18 June 2013.

==== Burnley ====
- HMS Active, RN: 1989.
- The Duke of Lancaster's Regiment: 2013.

==== Burton upon Trent ====
- The North Staffordshire Regiment: 1946.
- The Staffordshire Yeomanry: 1946.

==== Bury ====
- 207 (Manchester) Field Hospital Royal Army Medical Corps: 20 October 2017.

==== Bury St. Edmunds ====
- HMS Vengeance, RN: 14 June 2017.
- TS St Edmund Sea Cadet Corps: 14 June 2017.

==== Calderdale ====
- The Duke of Wellington's Regiment: 27 July 2002.

==== Cambridge ====
- 8th USAAF: 2 August 1945.
- The Cambridgeshire Regiment: 29 September 1946.
- RAF Oakington: 26 March 1972.
- The Royal Anglian Regiment: 1 March 1979.
- 104 (City of Cambridge) Squadron Air Training Corps: 2 May 1999.
- HMS Protector, RN: 6 July 2025.

==== Cannock Chase ====
- The Mercian Regiment: 7 November 2012.

==== Canterbury ====
- 5th Battalion The Royal Regiment of Scotland: 27 November 2008.

==== Carlisle ====
- RAF Spadeadam: 2 June 2018.

==== Carterton ====
- RAF Brize Norton: 21 April 2016.

==== Charnwood ====
- 2nd Battalion The Royal Anglian Regiment: 4 September 2006.
- 203 (Loughborough) Squadron The 158 (Royal Anglian) Transport Regiment: 15 April 2010.
- The Royal Logistic Corps: April 2010.

==== Chelmsford ====
- 3rd Battalion The Royal Anglian Regiment: 1980.
- The Inns of Court & City Yeomanry.

==== Chelsea ====
- 40th Signal Regiment, Royal Signals (Middlesex Yeomanry) (TA): 21 December 1959.
- London Irish Rifles, The Royal Ulster Rifles (TA): 21 December 1959.
- 101 (London) Field Engineer Regiment: 26 April 1960.

==== Cheltenham ====
- Central Flying School, RAF: 2 May 1962.
- RAF Innsworth: October 1986.

- Government Communications Headquarters: 13 May 2019.

==== Cheshire East ====
- The Mercian Regiment: 27 May 2010.

==== Cheshire West and Chester ====
- The Mercian Regiment: July 2008.

- Merseyside Wing Royal Air Force Air Cadets: 23 June 2025.
- 22 Multi-Role Medical Regiment Royal Army Medical Service: 23 June 2025.

==== Chester ====
- The Cheshire Regiment: 1948.
- The Cheshire Yeomanry: 1996.
- HMS Albion, RN: 2003.
- 1st Battalion The Mercian Regiment: 26 March 2008.
- 1st Battalion The Royal Welsh

==== Chesterfield ====
- The Sherwood Foresters: 17 July 1946.
- The Worcestershire and Sherwood Foresters Regiment: 27 July 1970.
- HMS Danae, RN: 12 February 1974.
- The Mercian Regiment: 12 December 2007.
- 575 Field Squadron Royal Engineers (V): 20 July 2011.
- The 9th/12th Royal Lancers: 10 February 2012.

==== Chichester ====
- Royal Sussex Regiment and its respective successors, the Queen's Royal Regiment and the Princess of Wales's Royal Regiment: 30 June 1951.
- RAF Tangmere, a Royal Air Force station which played a crucial role in the Battle of Britain: 1960
- The Royal Military Police: 7 January 1981.

==== Chippenham ====
- RAF Rudloe Manor: 1992.
- Duke of Edinburgh's Royal Regiment: 1994.
- 9 Regiment, Royal Logistic Corps: 19 January 2012.
- 1st Battalion The Rifles: 19 January 2012.

==== Chorley ====
- The Duke of Lancaster's Regiment: 2007.
- 3 Medical Regiment, RAMC: 6 June 2015.
- The Lancashire Constabulary.

==== Christchurch ====
- The Royal Hampshire Regiment: 19 October 1987.
- The Devonshire and Dorset Regiment.
- The Rifles: 1 May 2008.

==== Colchester ====
- The Essex Regiment: 3 April 1946.
- 3rd Battalion The Royal Anglian Regiment: 27 April 1977.
- 156 Provost Company Royal Military Police: 8 April 1998.
- 16 Air Assault Brigade: February 2008.

==== Congleton ====
- The Cheshire Yeomanry: 1906.
- The Cheshire Regiment: 1969.

==== Copeland ====
- Army Cadet Force: 27 June 2010.
- Sea Cadet Corps: 27 June 2010.
- Air Training Corps: 27 June 2010.

==== Corby ====
- Royal Anglian Regiment: 3 May 2012.

==== Corsham ====
- Ministry of Defence Corsham: 26 June 2010.

==== Cotswold ====
- 29 Regiment RLC: 10 March 2005.

==== Coventry ====
- HMS Diamond, RN: 16 October 2014.

==== Crewe ====
- 2nd Battalion The Mercian Regiment: 19 February 2015.

==== Crewe and Nantwich ====
- The Cheshire Regiment: 1986.
- 1st Battalion The Mercian Regiment (Cheshire)

==== Croydon ====
- 41 (Princess Louise's Kensington) Signal Squadron Royal Corps of Signals (Volunteers): 1993.
- 151 Regiment RLC (Volunteers): 1993.
- 2 Company 10th Battalion The Parachute Regiment (Volunteers): 1993.
- "C" Squadron Kent and Sharpshooters Yeomanry The Royal Yeomanry: 1993.
- 2nd Battalion The Rifles: 2010.

==== Dacorum ====
- RAF Halton: 2009.
- The Royal Anglian Regiment: 24 September 2014

==== Darlington ====
- The Light Infantry: 1996.
- The Rifles: 17 September 2010.

==== Dartmouth ====
- Britannia Royal Naval College: 1955.

==== Deal ====
- The Royal Marines: 14 February 1945.

==== Derby ====
- The Royal Navy Submarine Service: 28 April 2002.
- The Mercian Regiment: 2007.

==== Dereham ====
- 1st The Queen's Dragoon Guards: 28 June 2022.

==== Diss ====
- The Royal Anglian Regiment: 7 November 2012.

==== Doncaster ====
- The King's Own Yorkshire Light Infantry: 1945.
- RAF Finningley: 1975.
- The Rifles: 8 September 2007.

- The Coldstream Guards: 15 July 2021.

==== Dudley ====
- Royal Mercian and Lancastrian Yeomanry (TA): 30 June 2012.
- RAF Cosford: 4 December 2017.
- 63 Military Intelligence Company Intelligence Corps: 30 June 2019.

==== Durham ====
- The Rifles: 2007.
- HMS Bulwark, RN: 2010.
- 607 Squadron, RAF: 6 December 2017.

==== Ealing ====
- 562 (Transport) Squadron 151 (London) Transport Regiment: 16 April 2013

==== Eastbourne ====
- The Royal Sussex Regiment: 1951.

==== Eastleigh ====
- The Royal Hampshire Regiment: 14 September 1991.
- The Princess of Wales's Royal Regiment: September 1992.

==== East Staffordshire ====
- The Staffordshire Fire and Rescue Service: 1998.

==== Eccles ====
- 911 Company 42nd (East Lancashire) Infantry Division (TA): 25 April 1964.

==== Ellesmere Port and Neston ====
- The Cheshire Regiment: June 1986.
- The Mercian Regiment: 2007.

==== Ely ====
- The Cambridgeshire Regiment.
- D (Cambridgeshire) Company 6 Volunteer Battalion The Royal Anglian Regiment: 27 March 1977.
- RAF Hospital Ely, 1977
- RAF Strike Command: 26 September 1987.
- 1094 (City of Ely) Squadron Air Training Corps: 8 October 2019
- (City of Ely Detachment) 3 (Ironside) Company Cambridgeshire Army Cadet Force: 24 June 2023.

==== Epping Forest District ====
- 56 Squadron RAF: June 2018

==== Epsom and Ewell ====
- 135 Independent Geographic Squadron Royal Engineers (Reserve): 1999.
- The Princess of Wales's Royal Regiment: 2010.

==== Exeter ====
- The Royal Marines: April 1977
- 243 (The Wessex) Field Hospital (V): July 2002
- The Rifles (formerly The Devonshire and Dorset Regiment): June 2007
- The Coldstream Guards: July 2011
- RAF Brize Norton: 21 October 2013.
- HMS Defender, RN: March 2014

==== Falmouth ====
- RFA Mounts Bay, Royal Fleet Auxiliary: 25 April 2007.

==== Fareham ====
- HMS Collingwood, RN: 2 July 1974.

==== Finchley ====
- HMS Tartar, RN: 1942.
- 461 (Middlesex) Heavy Anti-Aircraft Regiment Royal Artillery (Territorial Army): 26 February 1951.
- HMS Tartar, RN: 14 August 1963.

==== Finsbury ====
- The Finsbury Rifles: 1949.

==== Folkestone ====
- 2nd Battalion The Royal Gurkha Rifles: 18 June 2009.
- The Canadian Armed Forces Serving Within the United Kingdom: 4 July 2018.

==== Friern Barnet ====
- HMS Fantome, RN: 28 March 1942.

==== Gateshead ====
- 72 Engineer Regiment: 9 July 2011.

- HMS Calliope, RN: 16 March 2026.

==== Gedling ====
- 2nd Battalion The Mercian Regiment: 20 October 2010.

==== Gillingham, Dorset ====
- Devonshire and Dorset Regiment: 1998
- The Rifles: 2007
- Gillingham Platoon of the Dorset Army Cadet Force: 2010

==== Gillingham, Kent ====
- The Royal Engineers: 21 August 1953.

==== Gloucester ====
- RAF Innsworth: 7 April 1960.
- 14 Signal Regiment: 28 April 1966.
- The Rifles: 2 April 2011.
- The Royal British Legion (Gloucester Branch): 24 March 2022.

==== Gosport ====
- The Engineering Training School Royal Navy: 17 April 1975.
- 40 Commando Royal Marines: 10 November 2005.
- 33 Field Hospital 2nd Medical Brigade RAMC: 23 April 2010.
- HMS Sultan, RN: 22 March 2013.

==== Grantham ====
- RAF Spitalgate: June 1952.

==== Gravesend ====
- The Princess of Wales’s Royal Regiment: 19 July 2011.

==== Great Aycliffe ====
- 124 Recovery Company (V) Royal Electrical and Mechanical Engineers: October 1987.

==== Great Yarmouth ====
- The 1st East Anglian Regiment: 1963.
- The Royal Anglian Regiment: 1964.
- HMS Yarmouth, RN: 1984.
- The Great Yarmouth and Gorleston Lifeboat Station, RNLI: 1984.
- The Caister Volunteer Lifeboat Service: 1984.

- 901 Troop Royal Marines Cadets: 28 September 2012.
- The Royal British Legion (Great Yarmouth Branch): 2 November 2012.
- HMS Dauntless, RN: 11 June 2013.

==== Greenwich ====
- The Royal Regiment of Artillery: 24 May 1966
- The Royal Naval College: 24 May 1966

==== Grimsby ====
- HMS Grimsby, RN: 2001.

==== Guildford ====
- Queen's Royal Regiment: September 1945.
- Queen's Royal Surrey Regiment: 1959.
- 1st Battalion The Queen's Regiment: 1 January 1967.
- Women's Royal Army Corps: 22 June 1988.
- Princess of Wales's Royal Regiment: 1992.

- Army Training Centre Pirbright: 7 March 2017.

==== Hackney ====
- 3 Military Intelligence Battalion (Volunteers): 2008.

==== Halifax ====
- The Duke of Wellington's Regiment: 18 June 1945.

==== Halton ====
- The Cheshire Regiment: 1988.

==== Hammersmith and Fulham ====
- Headquarters Squadron 31 Signal Regiment (Volunteers): 1981.
- The Royal Yeomanry (TA): 26 January 2011.
- 17 Company The Coldstream Guards: 21 May 2025.

==== Harborough ====
- The Royal Anglian Regiment: 7 April 2011.

==== Harlow ====
- The Essex Yeomanry: 25 April 2009
- The Royal Anglian Regiment: 27 September 2012.

==== Harpenden ====
- The Royal Anglian Regiment: 12 September 2013.

==== Harrogate ====
- The Army Foundation College: 11 June 2023.

==== Harrow ====
- 131 Independent Commando Squadron, Corps of Royal Engineers (Volunteers): 10 March 1983.
- 47 (Middlesex Yeomanry) Signal Squadron, 31st (Greater London) Signal Regiment Royal Corps of Signals: 10 March 1983.
- 257 (Southern) General Hospital Royal Army Medical Corps (Volunteers): 10 March 1983.
- RAF Stanmore Park: 20 October 1988.
- RAF Bentley Priory: 20 October 1988.
- Roxeth & Harrow Coy, Church Lads' & Church Girls' Brigade 20 October 1994
- Royal British Legion (Harrow Branch): 18 July 1996.
- 1454 (Harrow) Squadron Air Training Corps: 1 May 2014.

==== Hartlepool ====
- The Rifles: 19 March 2015.
- HM Coastguard (Hartlepool Coastguard Rescue Team): 19 March 2024.

==== Haslingden ====
- The Queen's Lancashire Regiment: 1964.
- The Duke of Lancaster's Regiment: 2006.

==== Hastings ====
- The Royal Sussex Regiment: 1947.

==== Havant ====
- 47th Regiment Royal Artillery: 3 July 2012.

==== Havering ====
- The Royal Anglian Regiment: Was in place as of September 2014.

==== Haverhill ====
- The Royal Anglian Regiment: 18 June 2019.

==== Heddon-on-the-Wall ====
- Humberside and South Yorkshire Squadron Army Cadet Force: 1960.

==== Helston ====
- HMS Seahawk, RN: 1958.

==== Hendon ====
- The Middlesex Regiment: 22 October 1955.

==== High Peak ====
- The Worcestershire and Sherwood Foresters Regiment: 1974.
- The Mercian Regiment: 18 December 2007.
- The Royal British Legion (6 Local Branches): 7 November 2018.

==== High Wycombe ====
- RAF High Wycombe: 1971.
- 7th Battalion The Rifles (TA): 9 June 2013.

==== Hillingdon ====
- RAF Uxbridge: 1960.
- RAF Northolt: 2000.
- 47 (Middlesex Yeomanry) Signal Squadron: 2007

==== Hinckley and Bosworth ====
- 2nd Battalion The Royal Anglian Regiment: 20 May 1978.

==== Hornsey ====
- 7th Battalion The Middlesex Regiment: 10 May 1948.

==== Hounslow ====
- 2nd Battalion the Royal Regiment of Fusiliers: 2009.
- The Royal British Legion (7 Local Branches): 4 April 2017.

==== Hove ====
- The Royal Sussex Regiment: 1958.

==== Huddersfield ====
- The Duke of Wellington's Regiment: 2 July 1952.
- The Yorkshire Regiment: 25 October 2008.

==== Hunstanton ====
- 67th Special Operations Squadron, USAF: 4 October 2014.

==== Huntingdon ====
- RAF Wyton: 17 September 1955.
- RAF Brampton: 1995.
- The Royal Anglian Regiment: 21 January 2010.
- The Princess of Wales's Royal Regiment: 23 November 2017.
- The 501st Combat Support Wing, USAF: 21 September 2018.

==== Huntingdonshire ====
- RAF Wyton: 17 August 2013.

==== Hyndburn ====
- The Queen's Lancashire Regiment: 29 June 2002.

==== Ilford ====
- The Essex Regiment: 14 June 1947.
- The 3rd East Anglian Regiment (16th/44th Foot): 9 September 1958.

==== Ipswich ====
- 1st Battalion The Suffolk Regiment: 1953.
- HMS Ganges, RN: 27 July 1971.
- HMS Quorn, RN: 6 February 2011.
- The Royal Anglian Regiment: September 2011.
- 4 Regiment Army Air Corps: 22 March 2002.
- 202 (Ipswich) Transport Squadron 158 (Royal Anglian) Transport Regiment (Volunteers)

==== Isle of Wight ====
- Isle of Wight Troop 266 Port Squadron 165 Port and Maritime Regiment Royal Logistic Corps: 28 November 2015.

==== Islington ====
- The Honourable Artillery Company: October 2009
- The Islington Veterans' Association: March 2015.
- The Islington and Holloway Fire Stations of the London Fire Brigade: March 2018.

==== Keighley ====
- The Yorkshire Regiment: 2011.

==== Kendal ====
- The Border Regiment: 25 October 1947.
- The King's Own Royal Border Regiment: 1 October 1959.
- The Duke of Lancaster's Regiment: 1 July 2006.

==== Kensington ====
- The Army Phantom Signal Regiment: 6 October 1959.

==== Kensington and Chelsea ====
- The Royal Hospital Chelsea: 28 June 2006.
- 31 (City of London) Signal Regiment (V)
- Kensington Regiment (Princess Louise's) Signal Squadron 38 Signal Regiment
- "D" Company (London Irish Rifles) The London Regiment
- 10 Company 4th Battalion, Parachute Regiment
- 21 Special Air Services Regiment (Artists Rifles) (V)
- 256 (City of London) Field Hospital (V)
- The Royal Yeomanry
- The University of London Air Squadron (V)
- University of London Royal Naval Unit

==== Kent ====
- HMS Kent, RN: 22 September 2023.
- The Brigade of Gurkhas: 17 September 2026.

==== Kettering ====
- The Royal Anglian Regiment: 14 December 2011.

==== Kidderminster ====
- The Mercian Regiment

==== King's Lynn and West Norfolk ====
- RAF Marham: 1981.
- The Royal Anglian Regiment.
- 42F (King’s Lynn) Squadron Air Training Corps: 11 October 2014.
- 67th Special Operations Squadron USAF: 4 October 2014.

==== Kingston upon Hull ====
- The East Yorkshire Regiment: 1 June 1944.
- The Prince of Wales's Own Regiment of Yorkshire: 5 June 1958.
- The Yorkshire Regiment: 16 November 2006.
- 440 (Humber) light Anti-Aircraft Regiment Royal Artillery (TA): 28 June 1960.
- 440 (Humber) light Anti-Aircraft Regiment Royal Artillery (Territorials): 3 August 1967.
- RAF Patrington: 16 May 1970.
- 150(N) Transport Regiment Royal Corps of Transport (Volunteers): 1 February 1990.
- RRH Staxton Wold: 3 March 1994.
- 150 (Yorkshire) Transport Regiment Royal Logistic Corps (Volunteers): 3 March 1994.
- HMS Iron Duke, RN: 3 March 1994.
- 250th Field Ambulance (Volunteer Unit): 15 July 1999.
- Hull Unit Sea Cadet Corps: 27 February 2014.
- Humberside and South Yorkshire Army Cadet Force: 21 March 2024.
- 152 (City of Hull) Squadron Air Training Corps: 21 March 2024.

==== Kingston upon Thames ====
- The Princess of Wales’s Royal Regiment
- 256 (City of London) Field Hospital (Volunteers): March 2009

==== Kirklees ====
- 3rd Battalion The Yorkshire Volunteers: 25 March 1979.
- 4th Battalion The Yorkshire Regiment: 25 October 2008.

==== Knowsley ====
- The Duke of Lancaster's Regiment: 12 October 2009.

==== Lancaster ====
- King's Own Royal Regiment: 29 August 1953.

==== Ledbury ====
- HMS Ledbury, RN: 2007.

==== Leeds ====
- HMS Ark Royal, RN: 4 November 1941.
- RAF Church Fenton: 1971.
- HMS Ark Royal, RN: 25 October 1973.
- 5th Battalion The Rifles: 1 August 2009.
- 4th Battalion The Parachute Regiment: 9 December 2020.
- Leeds Rifles
- Leeds Pals
- 51st (2nd Yorkshire West Riding) Regiment of Foot

==== Leicester ====
- The 9th/12th Royal Lancers: 30 June 2011.

==== Leighton–Linslade ====
- RAF Stanbridge: 27 April 1987.
- 1003 (Leighton Buzzard) Squadron Air Training Corps: 29 January 2001.

==== Lenham ====
- The Royal Electrical and Mechanical Engineers: 23 June 2024.

==== Lewes ====
- The Royal Sussex Regiment: 1953.

==== Lewisham ====
- 1475 (Dulwich) Squadron Air Training Corps (Date unknown)

==== Lichfield ====
- The Staffordshire Regiment: 7 November 1960.
- 3rd Battalion The Mercian Regiment: 2007.
- The Depot, The Prince of Wales' Division, Lichfield: 25 April 1981.
- The Army Training Regiment, Lichfield: 12 April 2000.
- The Joint Medical Command, Whittington Barracks: 12 September 2011.

- DMS Whittington: 28 September 2016.

==== Lincoln ====
- RAF Waddington: 25 April 1959.
- RAF Scampton: 14 May 1993.
- 2nd Battalion The Royal Anglian Regiment: 1997.
- The Grenadier Guards: 8 May 2008.

==== Liskeard ====
- The Royal British Legion (Liskeard Branch): 14 August 2022.

==== Littlehampton ====
- 30 Commando, RM: 5 October 2013.

==== Liverpool ====
- Duke of Lancaster's Regiment: 14 September 2008.
- War Widows Association (Merseyside Branch): 1 December 2014.
- 208 (3rd West Lancashire) Battery 103rd (Lancashire Artillery Volunteers) Regiment Royal Artillery: 14 October 2017.
- 8th Engineer Brigade, RE: 11 December 2020.
- The Parachute Regiment Association (Liverpool Branch): 24 October 2021.
- Liverpool Scottish Regimental Association: 29 April 2023.
- HMS Prince of Wales, RN: 6 December 2024.

==== City of London ====
Freedom of the City of London is a status into which only persons are admitted. The following units of HM Forces hold City Privileged Regiment status and consequently have the right to march through the City of London with drums beating, bayonets fixed and colours unfurled. Military units honoured in this fashion may only enter the City when the permission of the Lord Mayor of London has been sought and granted. All military units entering the City of London do so by permission of the Lord Mayor, they do not have 'the Freedom' even if they hold City Privileged Regiment status. Her Majesty's forces have no general right of entry to the City unless the Lord Mayor has granted permission. A civic officer going by the title of the City Marshal escorts all military units of HM Forces through the city.

- The Buffs (Royal East Kent Regiment): 1672.
- City of London Imperial Volunteers: 12 January 1901.
- The Royal Marines: 1924.
- The Honourable Artillery Company: 1924.
- The Grenadier Guards: October 1915.
- The Royal Regiment of Fusiliers: 13 October 1924.
- HMS Westminster, RN: 11 December 2005.
- 600 (City of London) Squadron, RAuxAF: 18 June 2010.
- 1475 (Dulwich) Squadron Air Training Corps: 2015.
- HMS President, RN: 15 November 2016.
- The Parachute Regiment
- 3 Military Intelligence Battalion The Intelligence Corps: 1 April 2019.

==== Loughborough ====
- The Royal Anglian Regiment: 19 June 2007

==== Louth ====
- The College of Air Warfare Manby: 21 October 1965.

==== Lowestoft ====
- The Royal British Legion (Lowestoft and District Branch): 17 November 2021.
- The Lowestoft Lifeboat, RNLI: 20 May 2024.

==== Ludgershall ====
- 26 Engineer Regiment: 30 May 2015.

==== Lyme Regis ====
- The Dorset Regiment: 1945.
- The Devonshire and Dorset Regiment: 1958.
- The Rifles: 2007.

==== Macclesfield ====
- 7th Battalion The Cheshire Regiment: 1949.
- 1st Battalion The Mercian Regiment: 19 March 2009.

==== Malmesbury ====
- 9 Regiment, Royal Logistic Corps: 29 June 2010.

==== Manchester ====
- The Manchester Regiment: 1946.
- 613 (City of Manchester) Squadron, RAuxAF: 1957.
- The King's Regiment: 1962.
- The Grenadier Guards: 1964.
- HMS Manchester, RN: 1998.
- The Duke of Lancaster's Regiment: 16 April 2010.
- 207 (Manchester) Field Hospital (Volunteers): October 2011

- 209 (The Manchester Artillery) Battery 103rd (Lancashire Artillery Volunteers) Regiment Royal Artillery: 30 October 2021.

==== March ====
- The Air Training Corps: 1996.
- The Army Cadet Force: 2001.

==== Maresfield ====
- 5 (Maresfield) Squadron 11 (Royal School of Signals) Signal Regiment: 27 June 2021.

==== Market Drayton ====
- 1st Battalion The Royal Irish Regiment: 21 April 2012.
- RAF Shawbury.
- The Royal British Legion (Market Drayton Branch): 9 September 2023.

==== Marlborough ====
- 4 Military Intelligence Battalion: 28 June 2011.

==== Maryport ====
- The Duke of Lancaster's Regiment: 20 May 2015.

==== Medway ====
- The Royal Corps of Engineers: 17 January 2008.
- HMS Chatham, RN: 12 February 2011.
- "C" Company 3rd Battalion The Princess of Wales's Royal Regiment: 25 January 2018.
- The Royal Marines.
- The Royal Naval Association (Chatham Branch): 21 July 2022.
- The Chatham Historic Dockyard Trust: 21 July 2022.

==== Melksham ====
- 2385 (Melksham) Squadron Air Training Corps: 12 May 2012.

==== Melton ====
- The Defence Animal Centre: 29 September 1977.
- HMS Quorn, RN: 18 March 2007.

==== Merton, Devon ====
- The Coldstream Guards: 5 July 2011

==== Middlesbrough ====
- The Green Howards: 13 May 1944.
- The 34th (Northern) Signal Regiment (Volunteers): 29 April 1972.
- HMS Marlborough, RN: 15 March 2000.
- The Yorkshire Regiment: 25 October 2006.

==== Mid Sussex ====
- The Royal Yeomanry: 23 July 2014.

==== Milton Keynes ====
- The Royal Green Jackets: 1978.
- The Rifles: 2007.
- 678 (The Rifles) Squadron, Army Air Corps: 11 March 2018.
- 261 (Horsa) Squadron 158 Regiment RLC: 2025.

==== Mole Valley ====
- Defence Medical Rehabilitation Centre Headley Court: 25 May 2010.

==== Morley ====
- The West Yorkshire Regiment: 1945.

==== Mossley ====
- The Duke of Wellington's Regiment: 8 July 1967.

==== Newark-on-Trent ====
- RAF Cranwell: 2002.

==== Newbury ====
- 42 Engineer Regiment (Geographic), RE: 1997.

==== Newcastle upon Tyne ====
- The Royal Northumberland Fusiliers: February 1948.
- The Royal Regiment of Fusiliers: 1968.
- The Northumberland Hussars: January 1969.
- The 15th/19th The King's Royal Hussars: May 1972.
- HMS Newcastle, RN: March 1978.
- 101st (Northumbrian) Field Regiment Royal Artillery (Volunteers): January 1980.
- 201 (Northern) General Hospital Royal Army Medical Corps (Volunteers): July 1984.
- The Royal Naval Reserve (Tyne Division): October 1985.
- The Royal Marines: July 1989.
- RAF Boulmer: 19 May 2018.

==== Newcastle-under-Lyme ====
- The Staffordshire Regiment: 1973.

==== New Forest ====
- The Royal Hampshire Regiment: 8 July 1986.
- 17 Port and Maritime Regiment, RLC: 16 May 2016.

==== Newham ====
- "G" Company 7th Battalion The Rifles: 23 June 2012.

==== Newmarket ====
- The Grenadier Guards: 12 September 2026.

==== Newton Abbot ====
- HMS Triumph, RN: 1 April 2023.

==== Northampton ====
- Northampton Unit Sea Cadet Corps: 26 March 2012.
- 9th/12th Royal Lancers: 5 November 2012.

==== North East Lincolnshire ====
- 45 Commando, RM: 16 May 2015.
- HMS Grimsby, RN: 16 September 2019.

==== North Tyneside ====
- 216 squadron (Tyne/Tees) Squadron Royal Corps of Transport (Volunteers) now 216 Tynemouth Squadron RLC. 23 February 1972.
- Royal British Legion (Whitley Bay and Forest Hall Branches): 15 October 2009.
- 2344 (Longbenton) Squadron Air Training Corps: 16 December 2014.

==== Northumberland ====
- HMS Northumberland, RN: 2004.
- 39th Regiment Royal Artillery: 3 September 2005.
- RAF Boulmer: 24 September 2010.
- 101st (Northumbrian) Regiment, Royal Artillery: 30 April 2016.

==== North Warwickshire ====
- HMS Atherstone, RN: 1996.

==== Norwich ====
- 1st East Anglian Regiment: 1964.
- 1st Battalion The Royal Anglian Regiment: 1984.
- RAF Marham: 2008.
- 2nd Air Division, USAAF Association
- Norfolk Constabulary

==== Nottingham ====
- The Sherwood Foresters: 1945.
- The Worcestershire and Sherwood Foresters Regiment: 1970.
- The Mercian Regiment: 15 October 2007.
- 73rd Engineer Regiment (Volunteers)
- East Midlands Universities Air Squadron: June 2011
- E Battery Royal Horse Artillery: 20 January 2014
- HMS Sherwood, RNR: 14 May 2018.

==== Nuneaton and Bedworth ====
- Junior Leaders Regiment, Royal Artillery: 1972.
- 30th Signal Regiment: 2002.
- 250 Gurkha Signal Squadron: 2002.
- 2nd Battalion The Royal Regiment of Fusiliers: 12 September 2010.

==== Oadby and Wigston ====
- The Royal Anglian Regiment: 2011.
- "B" Squadron Leicestershire and Derbyshire Yeomanry, Royal Yeomanry: 17 April 2012.

==== Oakham ====
- St George's Barracks, North Luffenham: 24 April 2013.
- RAF Cottesmore

==== Odiham ====
- RAF Odiham: 27 June 2025.

==== Oldham ====
- 41st (Oldham) Royal Tank Regiment (TA): 3 March 1954.
- 75 Engineer Regiment (Volunteers): 13 June 1999

==== Oxford ====
- Oxfordshire and Buckinghamshire Light Infantry: 1 October 1945.
- 1st Green Jackets (43rd and 52nd): 7 November 1958.
- Royal Green Jackets: 1 January 1966.
- The Rifles: 1 February 2007.

==== Oxfordshire ====
- 4624 (County of Oxford) Movements Squadron, Royal Auxiliary Air Force: May 2013.

==== Paignton ====
- 1st Battalion The Rifles: 2008.

==== Pendle ====
- The Queen's Lancashire Regiment: 2001.
- The Duke of Lancaster's Regiment: 1 July 2006.

==== Penzance ====
- HMS Penzance, RN: 2000.

==== Peterborough ====
- RAF Wittering: 1983.
- 158 (Royal Anglian) Transport Regiment, Royal Logistic Corps (Volunteers): 25 July 2009.
- 115 (Peterborough) Squadron Air Training Corps: 28 April 2014.
- The Royal British Legion (Peterborough Branch): 28 July 2021.

==== Plymouth ====
- 29 Commando Regiment Royal Artillery: 1996.
- 42 Commando, RM: 1955.
- The Merchant Navy: 22 March 2009.
- The Rifles: 25 September 2010.
- The Royal Naval Reserve
- The Ministry of Defence Hospital Unit Derriford: 30 January 2023.

==== Poole ====
- The Rifles: 19 March 2010.
- HMS Cattistock, RN: 6 May 2024.

==== Poplar ====
- The Poplar and Stepney Rifles: 16 October 1920.

==== Portsmouth ====
- The Royal Hampshire Regiment: 20 May 1950.
- The Royal Marines: 1959
- Portsmouth Command of the Royal Navy: 1965
- HMS King Alfred: 2003
- HMS Endurance: 2007
- Joint Hospital Group South Defence Medical Services: 22 September 2025.
- The Portsmouth Lifeboat Station, RNLI: 11 November 2026.

==== Preston ====
- The Loyal Regiment (North Lancashire): 7 August 1952. (This was subsequently transferred to:)
  - The Queen's Lancashire Regiment: 9 September 1972.
  - The Duke of Lancaster's Regiment: 1 July 2006.
- The 14th/20th King's Hussars: 6 November 1992.
- The Kings Royal Hussars

==== Purbeck ====
- Bovington Camp: 2010.

==== Ramsey ====
- Ramsey Division Army Cadet Force: 2 September 2018.

==== Ramsgate ====
- The Royal Hampshire Regiment: 1959.

==== Reading ====
- The Duke of Edinburgh's Royal Regiment: 1960.
- The Rifles: 8 May 2016.

==== Redbridge ====
- 3rd Battalion (16th/44th Foot) Royal Anglian Regiment: 18 May 1965.
- 45th (Essex) Signal Regiment (TA): 18 May 1965.
- 36 (Eastern) Signal Regiment: 1967.

==== Redcar and Cleveland ====
- The Yorkshire Regiment: 2008.

==== Redditch ====
- The Mercian Regiment: 20 May 2009.
- 37 Signal Regiment: 28 June 2014.

==== Restormel ====
- RAF St Mawgan: 10 April 1980.

==== Ribble Valley ====
- The 14th/20th King's Hussars: 24 August 1992.
- The King's Royal Hussars: 2 December 1992.
- The Duke of Lancaster's Regiment: 10 March 2011.

==== Richmond ====
- The Yorkshire Regiment
- The Royal Corps of Signals
- HMS Richmond, RN
- The RAF Regiment: 1971.
- 150 Provost Company Royal Military Police: 22 April 2006.
- 1 Close Support Battalion Royal Electrical & Mechanical Engineers in 2012.
- The Royal British Legion in 2013.

==== Richmond upon Thames ====
- HMS Richmond, RN: 2002
- The Royal Military School of Music: 2007
- The Poppy Factory: 12 December 2018.

==== Ripon ====
- The Royal Engineers: 27 July 1949.
- RAF Leeming: 14 September 2015.

==== Rochdale ====
- The Lancashire Fusiliers: 5 June 1947.
- The Royal Regiment of Fusiliers: 24 August 1977.
- HMS Middleton, RN: 20 May 1992.

==== Romsey ====
- The Royal Hampshire Regiment: 26 September 1959.
- The Princess of Wales's Royal Regiment inherited the Freedom from the Royal Hampshire Regiment as a result of the 1992 Options for Change merger with the Queen's Regiment.

==== Rossendale ====
- Queen's Lancashire Regiment: June 2004.

==== Ross-on-Wye ====
- The Rifles: 13 July 2013.

==== Rotherham ====
- The Yorkshire Regiment: 3 August 2009.

==== Royal Wootton Bassett ====
- 8 Training Battalion Royal Electrical and Mechanical Engineers: 6 July 2017.

==== Runnymede ====
- 94 Signal Squadron Berkshire Yeomanry: 25 July 2009.

==== Rushcliffe ====
- RAF Newton: 1984

==== Rushmoor, Hampshire ====
- The Royal Hampshire Regiment: 20 May 1981.
- The Queen Alexandra's Royal Army Nursing Corps: 29 May 1981.
- The Royal Military Police: 22 March 1984.
- The Royal Army Physical Training Corps: 17 September 2011.
- The Royal Gurkha Rifles: 30 July 2015

==== Salford ====
- The Lancashire Fusiliers: 18 October 1947.
- The Royal Regiment of Fusiliers: 26 April 1975.

==== Salisbury ====
- The Royal Wiltshire Yeomanry: 1944.
- Royal Gloucestershire, Berkshire and Wiltshire Regiment: October 2004.
- The Rifles: 20 November 2010.
- 32nd Regiment, Royal Artillery: 7 July 2016.
- The Royal Military Police: 13 June 2018.

==== Sandbach ====
- The Mercian Regiment: 29 June 2014

==== Sandhurst ====
- The Royal Military Academy Sandhurst: 1997.

==== Sandwell ====
- The Worcestershire and Sherwood Foresters Regiment – Oldbury
- 210 (Staffordshire) Battery, Royal Artillery (Volunteers) – West Bromwich
- 237 Transport Squadron, Royal Logistic Corps (Volunteers) – West Bromwich
- Royal Monmouthshire Royal Engineers – Rowley Regis and Smethwick
- 3rd Battalion of The Mercian Regiment – Sandwell
- 116 Provost Company Royal Military Police TA (West Bromwich) – Sandwell: 9 January 2007.
- 4 Regiment Royal Military Police: 9 January 2007.

==== Scarborough ====
- 64 Medical Squadron 5 Medical Regiment: 2007.
- 3 Medical Regiment: May 2015.
- The Yorkshire Regiment

==== Scunthorpe ====
- HMS Ariadne, RN: 1984.

==== Seaford ====
- 210 (Sussex) Field Squadron, RE (TA): 1959.

==== Seaham ====
- The 4th Regiment Royal Artillery: 23 July 2022.

==== Sefton ====
- 238 (Sefton) Squadron 156 Regiment Royal Corps of Transport: 6 March 1982 - transferred to:
- 238 (Sefton) Squadron 156 (North-West) Transport Regiment Royal Logistic Corps (Volunteers): 13 April 2002
- RAF Woodvale: 3 July 2011
- The Duke of Lancasters Regiment - 21 June 2017
- HMS Mersey, RN: 13 April 2023.

==== Selby ====
- 51 Squadron RAF: 22 March 2023.
- The Royal Yorkshire Regiment: 22 March 2023.

==== Sheffield ====
- The Duke of Wellington's Regiment: (West Riding)13 April 2002.
- 106 Field Squadron Royal Engineers: 2002.
- 38 (City of Sheffield) Signal Regiment: 23 January 2010.
- HMS Sheffield, RN:

==== Shoreham ====
- HMS Shoreham, RN: 17 February 2011.

==== Shrewsbury ====
- HMS Talent, RN: 7 June 2002.
- 1st The Queen's Dragoon Guards: 10 December 2014.
- The Rifles: 9 September 2016.
- The Royal Yeomanry: 30 July 2022.

==== Skipton ====
- The Duke of Wellington's Regiment: 4 May 1991.

==== Snaith and Cowick ====
- 51 Squadron, RAF: 22 April 2012.

==== Southampton ====
- The Royal Hampshire Regiment: 25 April 1946.
- 17 Port and Maritime Regiment, RLC: 26 January 2000.
- HMS Southampton, RN: 26 January 2000.

==== Southend-on-Sea ====
- 1st Battalion The Royal Anglian Regiment: 17 June 2010.

==== South Derbyshire ====
- 1211 (Swadlincote) Squadron Air Training Corps: 2 November 2017.

==== Southport ====
- 22 (Southport) Transport Column The Royal Army Service Corps (TA): 18 April 1953.

==== South Ribble ====
- The King's Royal Hussars: 1992.
- The Duke of Lancaster's Regiment: 25 April 2026.

==== South Tyneside ====
- HMS Euryalus, RN: 1981.
- 205 (3rd Durham Volunteer Artillery) Battery Royal Artillery: 2007.

- South Shields Volunteer Life Brigade: 11 May 2017.

==== Southwark ====
- 256 (City of London) Field Hospital (Volunteers): 30 June 2013.
- The Royal Marines Reserve (City of London): 30 June 2013.
- "D" Company The London Regiment: 30 June 2013.
- 2nd Battalion The Princess of Wales's Royal Regiment.

==== Spenborough ====
- The Duke of Wellington's Regiment: 24 February 1959.

==== Stafford ====
- RAF Stafford: 16 December 1954.
- 22 Signal Regiment: 19 April 2008.
- Tactical Supply Wing RAF: 19 April 2008.
- The Royal British Legion (Stafford Branch): 25 November 2021.
- 3rd Battalion The Mercian Regiment.
- HMS Collingwood, RN.
- Staffordshire Police.
- Staffordshire Fire and Rescue Service.

==== Stamford ====
- RAF Wittering: 1 July 1961.

==== St Albans ====
- HMS St Albans, RN: 18 June 2004.
- 201 (Hertfordshire and Bedfordshire Yeomanry) Parachute Battery RA (V): 8 July 2012.

==== St Edmundsbury, East Anglia ====
- RAF Honington: 1972.
- United States 3rd Air Force: June 2004.
- 677 Squadron Army Air Corps (Volunteers): 12 December 2006.
- 3 Regiment Army Air Corps (Wattisham): 22 June 2010.
- HMS Vengeance, RN: 18 May 2017.
- St Edmund Unit Sea Cadet Corps: 18 May 2017.

==== St Helens ====
- The Royal Military Police Association (Merseyside Branch): 29 February 2012.
- The Duke of Lancaster's Regiment: 1 December 2023.

==== St Ives, Cambridgeshire ====
- 42 Engineer Regiment, RE: 3 July 2018.

==== St Neots ====
- The Royal Anglian Regiment: 5 July 2014.
- 423d Air Base Group, USAF: 5 July 2014.
- 2500 (St Neots) Squadron Royal Air Force Air Cadets: 19 October 2017.

==== Stockport ====
- The Cheshire Regiment: 1969.
- 1st Battalion The Mercian Regiment: 11 November 2010.

==== Stockton-on-Tees ====
- 1 Close Support Battalion Royal Electrical and Mechanical Engineers.
- The Rifles: 9 September 2010.
- The Yorkshire Regiment.

==== Stoke Newington ====
- 56 (London) Infantry Division Provost Company Royal Military Police (TA): 10 December 1960.

==== Stoke-on-Trent ====
- The Queen's Royal Lancers: 4 December 2013.

==== Stowmarket ====
- Wattisham Airfield: 26 March 2010.

==== Sunderland ====
- 463 (mixed) Heavy Anti – Aircraft Regiment: 10 October 1951.
- The Durham Light Infantry: 10 October 1951.
- 582 Light Anti – Aircraft Searchlight Regiment: 10 October 1951.
- 4th Regiment Royal Artillery: 19 December 1973.
- 251 (Sunderland) Field Ambulance RAMC (V): 24 April 1985.
- HMS Arrow, RN: 14 October 1989.
- HMS Ocean, RN: 26 July 2004.
- 3rd Battalion The Rifles: 10 September 2010.

==== Surrey Heath ====
- Royal Military Academy Sandhurst: 20 January 2014.
- Joint Hospital Group South East: 12 September 2021.

==== Swindon ====
- The Wiltshire Regiment: 1960.
- RAF Lyneham: May 1964.
- The Royal Wiltshire Yeomanry: 2002.
- The Rifles: 9 April 2016.

==== Tameside ====
- The King's Regiment: 22 October 1994.
- The Duke of Lancaster's Regiment: 17 April 2007.
- The Mercian Regiment: 21 May 2013.

==== Tamworth ====
- Royal British Legion: 2014.
- Royal Naval Association: 2014.
- Mercian Regimental Association: 2014.
- Royal Air Force Association: 2014.
- Tamworth and Wilnecote Unit St. John Ambulance: 25 September 2015.
- The Mercian Regiment.
- The Defence Medical Services.
- RFA Fort Rosalie, Royal Fleet Auxiliary.

==== Taunton Deane ====
- The Somerset and Cornwall Light Infantry: 30 September 1961. (Borough of Taunton)
- 40 Commando, RM: 2003.
- The Light Infantry

==== Teesside ====
- The 34th (Northern) Signal Regiment (Volunteers): 16 May 1969.

==== Telford and Wrekin ====
- The Rifles: 29 May 2010.
- D Squadron (The Shropshire Yeomanry): 15 May 2025.

==== Test Valley ====
- 22 Engineer Regiment, RE: 28 April 1982.
- The Royal Hampshire Regiment: 25 June 1986.
  - The Princess of Wales's Royal Regiment: 9 September 1992.
- The Army Air Corps: 25 September 1987.
- School of Army Aviation: 25 September 1987.

==== Tewkesbury ====
- Central Vehicle Depot Ashchurch RAOC: 5 June 1971.
- The Gloucestershire Regiment: 30 March 1974.
- RAF Innsworth: 28 April 1977.
- The Royal Gloucestershire, Berkshire and Wiltshire Regiment: 15 February 2000.
- Allied Rapid Reaction Corps: 17 September 2012.
- Allied Rapid Reaction Corps Support Battalion: 17 September 2012.

==== Thame ====
- RAF Halton: 15 May 2022.

==== Thatcham ====
- The Royal School of Military Survey: 20 July 2011.
- 67 Military Intelligence Company Intelligence Corps: 4 June 2026.

==== Thetford ====
- RAF Honington: 9 June 2019.

==== Thurrock ====
- 215 (Essex) Squadron, RLC: 28 June 1986.
- The Royal Anglian Regiment: 18 July 1990.
- The Port of Tilbury Police: 25 September 2002.
- The Burma Star Association (Thurrock Branch): 26 November 2008.

==== Tiverton ====
- HMS Hermes, RN.
- HMS Enterprise, RN.

==== Tonbridge and Malling ====
- The Princess of Wales's Royal Regiment.
- 29 Squadron, RAF.
- The Royal British Legion Industries: 16 May 2025.

==== Torbay ====
- 1st Battalion The Rifles: 2008.
- HMS Torbay: 20 May 2015.
- RAF Brize Norton: 21 June 2018.

==== Torpoint ====
- HMS Raleigh, RN: 1997.

==== Torquay ====
- 1st Battalion The Rifles: 2008.

==== Tower Hamlets ====
- 114 (1st London) Army Engineer Regiment (TA): 27 April 1961.

==== Trafford ====
- 207 (Manchester) Field Hospital 2nd Medical Brigade RAMC (TA): 21 June 2011.

==== Trowbridge ====
- 14th Regiment Royal Artillery: 28 June 2014.

==== Truro ====
- The Rifles: 1 June 2009.

==== Tunbridge Wells ====
- HMS Brilliant, RN: 20 November 1982.
- 579 Field Squadron (EOD)(V): 18 October 2008.
- Princess of Wales's Royal Regiment: 15 July 2013.

==== Ulverston ====
- The Duke of Lancaster's Regiment: 7 May 2011.
- 2223 (Ulverston) Squadron Air Training Corps: 18 April 2015.

==== Uppingham ====
- 2nd Battalion The Royal Anglian Regiment: 3 May 2016.

==== Uttlesford ====
- 33 Engineer Regiment, RE: 2009.
- 101 Engineer Regiment, RE: 14 October 2011.
- 35 Engineer Regiment, RE: 25 February 2025.

==== Uxbridge ====
- RAF Uxbridge: 18 March 1960.

==== Vale Royal ====
- The Cheshire Regiment: 1988.

==== Vale of White Horse ====
- 3 Regiment RLC: 11 May 2016.
- 4 Regiment RLC: 11 May 2016.
- The Rifles: 11 May 2016.

==== Wakefield ====
- The King's Own Yorkshire Light Infantry: 1945.
- The Yorkshire Regiment: 13 March 2010.
- The Rifles: 11 September 2010.

==== Wallingford ====
- RAF Benson: 1957.

==== Walsall ====
- The South Staffordshire Regiment: 1946.
- The Staffordshire Regiment: 1959.
- The Mercian Regiment: 2007.

==== Waltham Forest ====
- 68 (ICCY) Signal Squadron: 1998.

==== Wandsworth ====
- The London Regiment: 1992.
- 2nd Battalion Royal Tank Regiment: 2011.
- The Royal Marines Reserve: 30 January 2017.

==== Wanstead and Woodford ====
- 45th (Essex) Signal Regiment (Volunteers): 1963.

==== Wantage ====
- Scots Guards: 2 August 2010.
- HMS Queen Elizabeth, RN: 14 October 2019.

Freedoms within Vale of White Horse and Oxfordshire apply to Wantage

==== Warminster ====
- 3rd Battalion The Yorkshire Regiment: 21 September 2012.

==== Warrington ====
- South Lancashire Regiment: 17 September 1947.
- The Queen's Lancashire Regiment: 25 March 1970.
- The Duke of Lancaster's Regiment: 1 July 2006.
- 75 Engineer Regiment: 20 May 2013.

==== Warwick ====
- MoD Kineton: 4 April 2013.
- The Royal Regiment of Fusiliers: 26 November 2013.

==== Warwickshire ====
- Royal Regiment of Fusiliers: 28 March 2014.

==== Watford ====
- 1st East Anglian Regiment: 1959.
- Royal Anglian Regiment: 1964.

==== Waverley ====
- 2nd Battalion The Princess of Wales's Royal Regiment: 15 June 2011.

==== Wellingborough ====
- The Royal Anglian Regiment: 27 April 1985.

==== Wellington ====
- The Rifles: 17 June 2023.

==== Wells ====
- The Somerset Light Infantry: 6 April 1956.
- HMS Somerset, RN.
- The Rifles.

==== Wem ====
- RAF Shawbury: 1 August 2018.

==== West Bromwich ====
- 904 Company 48th (South Midland) Division (TVAR): 1963.

==== West Lancashire ====
- The Duke of Lancaster's Regiment: 22 October 2011.

==== West Suffolk ====
- The Suffolk Regiment: 1944. (Borough of Bury St Edmunds)
- 358 (Suffolk Yeomanry) Medium Regiment, RA: 1953. (Borough of Bury St Edmunds)
- The 1st East Anglian Regiment: 1963. (Borough of Bury St Edmunds)
- The Suffolk and Norfolk Yeomanry: 1967. (Borough of Bury St Edmunds)
- RAF Honington: 1972.
- 3rd Air Force, USAF: 2000. (St Edmundsbury Borough)
- The Normandy Veterans' Association (Bury St Edmunds and District Branch No35): 2004. (St Edmundsbury Borough)
- 1st Battalion The Royal Anglian Regiment: 2006. (St Edmundsbury Borough)
- 3 Regiment Army Air Corps (Wattisham): 2010. (St Edmundsbury Borough)

==== City of Westminster ====
- 4th Battalion The Royal Green Jackets: 5 December 1985.
- HMS Westminster, RN: 11 December 2005.

==== Weston-super-Mare ====
- 40 Commando, RM: 21 June 2014.
- The Weston Lifeboat, RNLI: 20 November 2023.

==== Weymouth and Melcombe Regis ====
- R Battery 250th (Queen's Own Dorset and West Somerset Yeomanry) Medium Regiment RA: 22 October 1966.

==== Weymouth and Portland ====
- HMS Portland, RN: 2009.
- Weymouth Unit Sea Cadet Corps: 23 January 2017.

==== Whitby ====
- 1 Close Support Battalion The Royal Electrical and Mechanical Engineers: 25 July 2026.

==== Whitehaven ====
- Whitehaven Unit Sea Cadet Corps: 27 June 2010.
- Whitehaven Detachment Army Cadet Force: 27 June 2010.
- 1030 (Whitehaven) Squadron Air Training Corps: 27 June 2010.
- 1st Battalion The Duke of Lancaster's Regiment: 20 May 2013.

==== Wigan ====
- "D" Squadron (TA Reserve) Royal Mercian and Lancastrian Yeomanry: 27 February 2008
- The Duke of Lancaster's Regiment: 2 December 2019.

==== Wimborne Minster ====
- The Rifles: 2010.
- 280 (Nato) Signal Squadron The Royal Corps of Signals: 25 March 2025.

==== Wincanton ====
- 1st Regiment Army Air Corps: 26 May 2016.

==== Winchester ====
- The Royal Army Pay Corps: 1970.
- The Adjutant General's Corps: 1996.
- Winchester Army Training Regiment: 17 April 2004.
- The Royal Hampshire Regiment: 15 September 1945.
- The Kings Royal Hussars: 1946.
- The Rifle Brigade (The Prince Consort's Own): 1946.
- The Royal Green Jackets: 1 January 1966.
- The Rifles: 1 February 2007.
- The Royal Logistic Corps: 1 June 2023.
- The Defence School of Logistics and Administration: 26 June 2024.

==== Windsor and Maidenhead ====
- The Royal Berkshire Regiment: 1959
- The Duke of Edinburgh's Royal Regiment: 1960
- The Household Cavalry: 1965
- The Brigade of Guards: 1968
- The Berkshire Yeomanry: 1993
- The Royal Gloucestershire, Berkshire and Wiltshire Regiment: 1999
- The Rifles: 2006

==== Wirral ====
- The Cheshire Regiment: 1996.
- The Royal Marines: 1998.
- 1st Battalion The Mercian Regiment: 2009.
- 234 (Wirral) Transport Squadron, RLC (Volunteers): 18 February 2012.
- 107 (Lancashire and Cheshire) Field Squadron (Volunteers): 18 February 2012.

- HMS Astute, RN: 6 July 2015.
- Wallasey Sea Cadet Corps: 6 July 2015.

==== Wisbech ====
- 2620 (County of Norfolk) Squadron Royal Auxiliary Air Force: 18 October 2025.

==== Woking ====
- The Army Training Centre Pirbright: 8 December 2016.

==== Wokingham ====
- The Royal Electrical and Mechanical Engineers: 21 October 1978.

==== Wolverhampton ====
- Defence College of Aeronautical Engineering, DCAE Cosford
- The Staffordshire Regiment
- 210 (Staffordshire) Battery 106th (Yeomanry) Regiment Royal Artillery
- West Midlands Fire Service
- HMS Forward, RNR: 29 September 2019.

==== Woodbridge ====
- 23 Parachute Engineer Regiment: 2006.
- The Royal Air Force: 11 June 2016.
- The Royal British Legion (Woodbridge Branch): 11 June 2016.

==== Wood Green ====
- 7th Battalion The Middlesex Regiment: 20 September 1945.

==== Woolwich ====
- The Royal Artillery: 28 March 1954.

==== Worcester ====
- The Worcestershire Regiment: 15 April 1950.
- The Worcestershire and Sherwood Foresters Regiment: 1970.
- The Mercian Regiment: 1 September 2007.
- The Queen's Royal Hussars: 2014.

==== Worthing ====
- H (Worthing Company) 2nd Volunteer Battalion Royal Sussex Regiment: 1901.
- The Princess of Wales's Royal Regiment: 4 July 1949.

==== Workington ====
- The Border Regiment: 28 July 1959.

==== Wychavon ====
- The Mercian Regiment: 29 March 2011.

==== Wycombe ====
- RAF High Wycombe: April 2011.

==== Wyre ====
- The Duke of Lancaster's Regiment: 12 April 2018.

==== Yeovil ====
- RNAS Yeovilton: 1962

==== York ====
- The Royal Dragoon Guards: 24 April 1999.
- 2 Signals Regiment: January 2001.
- "A" Squadron The Queen's Own Yeomanry: 3 December 2009.
- RAF Linton on Ouse: 19 September 2010.
- The Queen's Gurkha Signals: 8 September 2015.

=== Scotland ===
==== Aberdeen ====
- The Gordon Highlanders: 20 August 1949.
- HMS Scylla, RN: 8 June 1992.
- 4th Battalion, The Royal Regiment of Scotland: 1 July 2006.

==== Aberdeenshire ====
- The Royal Regiment of Scotland: 11 May 2024.

==== Angus ====
- 45 Commando, RM: 2003.
- The Black Watch Regiment: 2006.
- 11 (AC) Squadron, RAF: 26 July 2019.

==== Ayr ====
- The Royal Scots Fusiliers: 15 June 1946.

==== Coldstream ====
- The Coldstream Guards: 10 August 1968.

==== Dumfries ====
- The King's Own Scottish Borderers: 1953.

==== Dumfries and Galloway ====
- The Royal Regiment of Scotland: 12 June 2008.
- The Royal British Legion (RBL Scotland): 1 April 2022.

==== Dundee ====
- The Black Watch (Royal Highland Regiment): 1954.
- The Royal Regiment of Scotland: 20 June 2026.

==== East Lothian ====
- 1st Battalion The Royal Scots Borderers: 2012.
- "E" Squadron The Scottish and North Irish Yeomanry: 6 July 2019.

==== Edinburgh ====
- 3rd Battalion The Rifles: 3 November 2012.
- The Royal Scots Borderers: 20 April 2013.
- 603 Squadron RAF: 3 July 2018.
- "E" Squadron The Scottish and North Irish Yeomanry: 2 April 2022.
- HMS Queen Elizabeth, RN: 18 September 2026.

==== Glasgow ====
- The Highland Light Infantry
- Royal Marines: 1 November 2014
- The Royal Highland Fusiliers: 8 October 2018.

==== Highlands ====
- The Royal Regiment of Scotland: 15 October 2015.

==== Inverclyde ====
- The Royal Regiment of Scotland: 10 March 2025.

==== Inverness ====
- The Queen's Own Highlanders (Seaforth and Camerons): 1961.
- The 19th Regiment, Royal Artillery: 12 March 1999.

==== Kirkcaldy ====
- The Black Watch (Royal Highland Regiment) : March 1996.

==== Lossiemouth and Branderburgh ====
- RNAS Lossiemouth: 8 July 1967.

==== Orkney ====
- The Northern Diving Group Royal Navy: 9 July 2021.

==== Perth ====
- The Black Watch (Royal Highland Regiment): 19 July 1947.
- The Royal British Legion (Scotland): 8 May 2004.
- 51st Highland Volunteers The Royal Regiment of Scotland: 8 May 2010.

==== Renfrewshire ====
- The Argyll and Sutherland Highlanders: 20 June 2011.

==== Scottish Borders ====
- The Royal Regiment of Scotland: 11 June 2011.

==== South Ayrshire ====
- "A" Squadron Queen's Own Yeomanry
- HMS Gannet, RN: 17 July 2009.
- RAF Prestwick: 17 July 2009.

==== St Andrews ====
- RAF Leuchars: 1968.

==== Stirling ====
- The Argyll and Sutherland Highlanders: 1947.
- 43 Squadron RAF: 2005.
- The Royal Regiment of Scotland: 10 March 2012.

==== Sutherland ====
- HMS Sutherland, RN: March 2011.

=== Wales ===
==== Aberconwy ====
- The Royal Welch Fusiliers: 2 September 1989.

==== Aberystwyth ====
- The Welsh Guards: 1955.

==== Ammanford ====
- The Royal British Legion (Ammanford Branch): 5 September 2024.

==== Anglesey ====
- RAF Valley: 1974.
- The Royal Welsh: 8 December 2011.
- The Royal Naval Submarine Service: 28 May 2019.

==== Arfon ====
- The Royal Welch Fusiliers 5 November 1975.

==== Bangor ====
- The Royal Welsh: 23 July 2011.

==== Barry ====
- RAF St Athan: 1959.

==== Blackwood ====
- 1st Battalion The Royal Welsh: 25 September 2010.

==== Blaenau Gwent ====
- The Royal Welsh: 19 February 2011.
- The Royal British Legion: 4 November 2021.

==== Brecon ====
- The South Wales Borderers: 11 June 1948.
- Gurkha Demonstration Company The Brigade of Gurkhas: 21 November 1985.
- The Small Arms School Corps: 20 April 2017.

==== Bridgend ====
- The Royal Welsh: 30 August 2008.
- 2 Company 1st Battalion The Welsh Guards: 11 May 2011.

==== Caernarfon ====
- The Royal Welch Fusiliers: 1946.
- The Royal Welsh: 25 April 2009.

==== Caerphilly ====
- The Royal Welsh: 26 September 2010.
- The Royal British Legion: 25 March 2022.

==== Cardiff ====
- The Welch Regiment: 10 June 1944.
- The Welsh Guards: 7 April 1957.
- The Royal Regiment of Wales: 11 June 1969.
- The Royal Welch Fusiliers: 7 November 1973.
- The 1st The Queen's Dragoon Guards: 29 July 1985.
- HMS Cardiff, RN: 3 February 1988.
- 203 (Welsh) Field Hospital 2nd Medical Brigade: 21 April 2014.
- HMS Dragon, RN: 18 May 2014.

==== Carmarthen ====
- The Welch Regiment: 1945.
- The Royal Regiment of Wales: 1969.
- The Royal Welch Fusiliers: 8 July 1998.

==== Carmarthenshire ====
- 2nd Battalion The Royal Welsh: 2008.

==== Ceredigion ====
- 2nd Battalion The Royal Welsh: 25 April 2009.
- The Welsh Guards: 24 June 2020.

==== Chepstow ====
- 1st Battalion The Rifles: 17 November 2011.

==== Clwyd ====
- The Royal Air Force.

==== Conwy ====
- The Royal Welch Fusiliers: 19 April 1958.
- 1st Battalion The Royal Welsh: 20 September 2010.

==== Cowbridge with Llanblethian ====
- RAF St Athan.

==== Delyn ====
- The Royal Welch Fusiliers: 24 April 1976.

==== Denbighshire ====
- 1st Battalion The Royal Welsh: 13 June 2011.

==== Flint ====
- 384th Anti-tank Regiment Royal Artillery: 1947.

==== Flintshire ====
- The Royal Welsh: 24 April 2009.

==== Haverfordwest ====
- HMS Goldcrest: 1964.
- 14 Signal Regiment: 4 March 2009.

==== Llandudno ====
- RAF Valley: September 1995.
- Llandudno Lifeboat Station, RNLI: January 2002.
- 203 (Welsh) Field Hospital (Volunteers) RAMC: 19 September 2009.

==== Merthyr Tydfil ====
- The Royal Welch Fusiliers: 15 April 1994.

==== Monmouth ====
- The Royal Monmouthshire Royal Engineers: 1953.
- HMS Monmouth, RN: 18 January 2004.

==== Monmouthshire ====
- The Royal Welsh: 4 March 2011.

==== Neath Port Talbot ====
- The Royal Regiment of Wales: July 1993.
- The Royal Welsh: 2006.

==== Newport ====
- The 104th Regiment Royal Artillery (TA): 1978.
- The Royal Welch Fusiliers: 15 September 2001.
- HMS Severn, RN: 19 June 2006.
- The Royal British Legion: 28 October 2021.

==== Pembroke ====
- HMS Pembroke, RN: 15 September 2006.
- 1st Battalion The Royal Welsh: 15 September 2018.

==== Pembroke Dock ====
- HMS Pembroke, RN: 15 September 2006.

==== Pencoed ====
- 2426 (Pencoed) Squadron Air Training Corps: 4 December 2014.

==== Powys ====
- The Welsh Guards: 2011.

==== Prestatyn ====
- 119 (Holywell) Recovery Company (V) Royal Electrical and Mechanical Engineers: 12 September 1992.

==== Rhondda Cynon Taf ====
- The Royal Welsh: 2010.
- The Welsh Guards: 15 May 2013.
- MOD St Athan: 2 June 2018.

==== St Davids ====
- 245 Signal Squadron 14 Signal Regiment: 12 May 1997.
- 948 (Haverfordwest and St Davids) Squadron Air Training Corps: 2 May 2020.

==== Swansea ====
- The Welsh Guards: 15 September 1948.
- The Welch Regiment: 17 February 1960.
- The Royal Monmouthshire Royal Engineers: 15 April 1978.
- The Royal Regiment of Wales: 20 February 1981.
- HMS Arethusa, RN: 27 June 1981.
- Her Majesty's Coastguard (Swansea Station): 8 December 1982.
- The Mumbles Lifeboat Station, RNLI: 23 April 1987.
- The Royal Welch Fusiliers: 1 March 1994.
- HMS Scott, RN: 15 September 2006.
- The Royal Welsh: 13 September 2008.
- 1st The Queen's Dragoon Guards: 2009.
- 215 (City of Swansea) Squadron, Air Training Corps: 12 March 2016.
- HMS Cambria, RNR: 17 March 2018.
- 157 (Welsh) Regiment, RLC: 27 July 2019.

==== Tenby ====
- HMS Tenby, RN: 1970.
- TS Tenby Sea Cadet Corps: 27 September 2026.

==== Torfaen ====
- Royal Welsh: 5 June 2010.
- The Royal British Legion: 28 June 2021.

==== Vale of Glamorgan ====
- RAF St Athan: 18 May 1974.
- The Merchant Navy Association: 16 April 2005.
- The Welsh Guards: 16 March 2006.
- The Royal Welsh: 21 February 2009.
- 203 (Welsh) Field Hospital (Volunteers) RAMC: 17 April 2010.
- HMS Cambria, RN: 31 March 2012.

==== Wrexham ====
- Royal Welch Fusiliers: 5 June 1946.
- The Royal Welsh: 2008.
- 101 Force Support Battalion, Royal Electrical and Mechanical Engineers: 5 April 2013.
- The Welsh Guards: 18 July 2014.
- The Royal Air Force: 22 August 2018.
- HMS Dragon, RN: 25 September 2024.

==== Wrexham Maelor ====
- The Royal Welch Fusiliers: 17 September 1983.

=== Northern Ireland ===
==== Antrim and Newtownabbey ====
- The Royal Ulster Constabulary: 1 June 1984. (Borough of Newtownabbey)
- The Royal Ulster Constabulary Reserve: 1 June 1984. (Borough of Newtownabbey)
- The Ulster Defence Regiment: 11 March 1989. (Borough of Newtownabbey)
- The Ulster Defence Regiment: 28 April 1990. (Borough of Antrim)
- The Royal Irish Rangers: 5 May 1990. (Borough of Newtownabbey)
- The Royal Air Force: 17 April 1993. (Borough of Newtownabbey)
- 321 EOD Squadron, RLC: 30 October 1993. (Borough of Newtownabbey)
- The Royal British Legion: 11 May 1996. (Borough of Newtownabbey)
- The Royal Air Force: 15 March 1997. (Borough of Antrim)
- The Northern Ireland Fire and Rescue Service: 24 May 2000. (Borough of Newtownabbey)
- The Royal Ulster Constabulary: 3 March 2001. (Borough of Antrim)
- The Royal Ulster Constabulary Reserve: 3 March 2001. (Borough of Antrim)
- Northern Ireland Burma Star Association: 6 April 2002. (Borough of Newtownabbey)
- The Royal Navy: 18 May 2002.
- The Royal Naval Reserve: 18 May 2002.
- The Royal Marines: 18 May 2002.
- The Royal Marines Reserve: 18 May 2002.
- The Northern Ireland Ambulance Service: 10 December 2003. (Borough of Antrim)
- The Northern Ireland Fire and Rescue Service: 10 December 2003. (Borough of Antrim)
- The Royal British Legion: 24 June 2006. (Borough of Antrim)
- 25 Engineer Regiment, RE: 26 May 2007. (Borough of Antrim)
- The Merchant Navy: 4 April 2012.

- St John Ambulance Northern Ireland: 1 October 2026.

==== Ards and North Down ====
- The Irish Guards: 24 June 2022.
- The Northern Ireland Fire and Rescue Service: 12 October 2024.

==== Ballymena ====
- The Royal Irish Regiment: 1 October 1994.

==== Ballymoney ====
- The Royal British Legion (Ballmoney Branch): 22 February 1997.
- The Royal Irish Regiment: 12 May 2012.
- 152 (North Irish) Regiment, RLC: 1 September 2012.
- The Royal Ulster Constabulary
- The Royal Ulster Constabulary (Reserve)
- The Northern Ireland Fire Brigade

==== Bangor ====
- The Police Service of Northern Ireland: 25 March 2012.

==== Belfast ====
- The Royal Ulster Rifles: 6 February 1954.
- The Royal Sussex Regiment: 1961.

==== Castlereagh ====
- The Ulster Defence Regiment: 1984.
- The Ulster Special Constabulary Association: 2 May 1992.
- The Regimental Association of the Ulster Defence Regiment: 1994.
- The Royal Irish Regiment: 1995.
- The Royal British Legion: 1996.
- The 204 (North Irish) Field Hospital Royal Army Medical Corps (Volunteers): 1998.
- The Royal Ulster Constabulary GC: 2000.
- The Northern Ireland Prison Service: 2004.
- The 152 (North Irish) Regiment RLC (Volunteers): 25 May 2013.
- The 152 Field Company, 106 Battalion Royal Electrical and Mechanical Engineers Workshops: 25 May 2013.
- The Police Service of Northern Ireland: December 2014.

==== Causeway Coast and Glens ====
- 152 (Ulster) Transport Regiment, RLC: 25 October 2008.
- 206 (Ulster) Battery, Royal Artillery (Volunteers): 2015.
- The Royal Air Force: 8 April 2022.
- The Northern Ireland Prison Service: 28 August 2026.

==== Coleraine ====
- The Ulster Defence Regiment: 28 March 1981.
- 206 (Ulster) Battery, Royal Artillery (Volunteers): 1992.
- Professor Gerry McKenna:2000.<"Meeting of Coleraine Borough Council Agenda" (PDF).

==== Larne ====
- The Royal Irish Regiment: 1 November 2008.

==== Lisburn ====
- The Royal Irish Regiment: May 2011

==== Mid and East Antrim ====
- "B" Squadron Scottish and North Irish Yeomanry: 31 January 2016.

=== Zimbabwe ===
==== Bulawayo ====
- 3 March 1989: Bulawayo District Zimbabwe National Army.
- 3 March 1989: 1 Brigade Zimbabwe National Army.
