= 84 Medical Supply Squadron RLC =

84 Medical Supply Squadron RLC
- Active: 1984-present
- Country: United Kingdom
- Branch: British Army
- Type: Squadron
- Role: Medical Supply
- Part of: Royal Logistic Corps
- Garrison/HQ: Buckley Barracks
- Website: 9 Regt RLC

84 Medical Supply Squadron is a squadron of the British Army's Royal Logistic Corps. It is currently attached to 9 Regiment RLC and provides medical supply to the British Armed Forces when deployed on operations around the world.

To this day 84 Medical Supply Squadron is still one of the most operationally deployed squadrons in the British Army and is the only one providing medical supply year-round to all three services in theatre.

== History ==
=== 84 Field Medical Equipment Depot ===
A new department was created under the name of 84 Field Medical Equipment Depot (84 FMED) in 1984 due to difficulties encountered during the Falklands War by the Defence Medical Equipment Depot (DMED). The new depot came under the Royal Army Medical Corps (RAMC) control and was located on shelves in the “Green Zone” behind “Mobs & Kits” at DMED in Ludgershall. There the stores and equipment were periodically turned over by RAMC Medical Storeman (later called Medical Supply Techs/MSTs) who worked at DMED as 84 FMED's manning was names on paper only.

==== Deployments ====
Even though this new depot had been created it was very rarely deployed, the only one of note was the deployment on Operation Granby, Kuwait in 1991. The depot would rarely see service until 1999 with the conflict in Kosovo and subsequent peace keeping Operations. This brought about another change. The equipment that was held for 84 FMED was by now obsolete or incompatible with more modern equipment held by the units it would be supplying. A complete review of its holding was made and items and quantities held were changed. This was not the same as 84 FMED so a name change was issued; it was now to be referred to as 84 Medical Supply Squadron (84 MSS).

=== 84 Medical Supply Squadron ===
84 MSS was still an RAMC asset but the Medical Supply Tech Trade had been disbanded and replaced by an Additional Qualification Course for Combat Medical Technicians (CMT) (although many MSTs transferred to CMT and remained in their previous jobs and roles) so 84 now found itself staffed by Pharmacists, Pharmacy Technicians and CMTs with Laboratory Technicians for Blood Products.

The new 84 MSS fully ran the depot in Kosovo for about a year before handing control over to the resident Med Group of each tour. Things returned to relative quiet again with only small participation in operations and exercises like Saif Sareea 2, Oman in 2001.

==== Deployments ====
The squadron then returned to the deserts of Kuwait for Operation Telic in 2003. The squadron firstly set up at Camp Fox, Kuwait in January 2003 then moved to Umm Qasr Port in May 2003 for around one month before moving on to Az Zabaya in June 2003. Two months later the squadron moved to Shaibah Logistical Base (SLB) where it stayed for the next three years before moving into the old Basra International Airport now known as the Contingency Operating Base (COB) around December 2006.

During the squadron's time in Iraq three important things happened to affect how it functioned, the first being the closure of MSA and the squadron being relocated to Buckley Barracks at Stanton St Quintin, Chippenham on 31 March 2005.

== 84 Medical Supply Squadron RLC ==
The second (possibly the biggest change in its history) was for 84 MSS to be disbanded as an RAMC unit and be taken under Royal Logistic Corps (RLC) command.

Not all RAMC personnel have left the squadron there are still two captains (one being a pharmacist the other a medical support officer), two warrant officers (one being a pharmacy technician the other a biomedical scientist) and one sergeant (pharmacy technician).

=== Deployments ===
The third being the deployment on Operation Herrick 4, Afghanistan in 2006 which pushed the squadron into being the only squadron in the British Armed Forces to be simultaneously and permanently deployed to two theatres of operations. Since then the squadron has been deployed personnel in almost every theatre of operations including Operation Gritrock, the ebola crisis response in Sierra Leone in 2015.
