= Buckley Barracks =

British Army barracks in Wiltshire, England

- Hullavington, Wiltshire; Near Chippenham in England
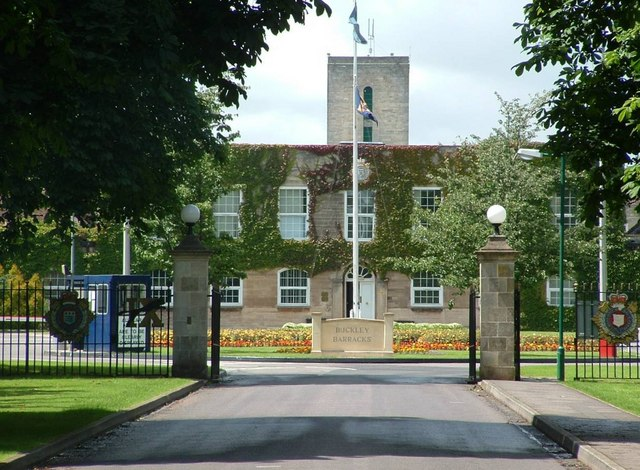
- Buckley Barracks

Site information
- Type: Barracks
- Owner: Ministry of Defence
- Operator: British Army
- Controlled by: Royal Logistic Corps

Location
- Shown within Wiltshire
- Coordinates: 51°31′40″N 002°07′40″W

Site history
- Built: 1937
- In use: 1937–1992 (Royal Air Force); 1993 – present (British Army)

Garrison information
- Garrison: 9 Regiment, Royal Logistic Corps

Buckley Barracks is a British Army barracks in Wiltshire, England, about 4 1/2 miles (7 km) north of Chippenham and 15 miles (24 km) west of Swindon. It is set to close in 2029.

== History ==
The barracks are on the technical site of the former RAF Hullavington which closed on 31 March 1992. On handover of the site to the Army in April 1993, it became known as Hullavington Barracks.

In 1993, as part of the draw-down of the BAOR and withdrawal from Germany, 237 Signal Squadron, a field squadron of 14 Signal Regiment (Electronic Warfare) relocated from Celle, Germany to Hullavington. The Squadron moved again in June 1996 to rejoin the other two Squadrons (226 and 245 Signal Squadrons) that make up 14 Signal Regiment at Cawdor Barracks near Haverfordwest, Pembrokeshire.

The establishment was renamed Buckley Barracks in 2003, after the Victoria Cross recipient Major John Buckley.

The barracks are currently occupied by 9 Regiment of the Royal Logistic Corps (RLC). As of 1 November 2018, there were 659 personnel assigned to the regiment.

== Based units ==
The following notable units are based at Buckley Barracks.

- Royal Logistics Corps
  - 9 Regiment
    - 90 Headquarters Squadron
    - 66 Fuel and General Transport Squadron
    - 84 Medical Supply Squadron
    - 94 Supply Squadron, Queen's Own Gurkha Logistic Regiment

== Future ==
In November 2016, the Ministry of Defence announced that the site would close in 2029 as part of the Better Defence Estate review.
