= 152 (North Irish) Regiment RLC =

152 (North Irish) Regiment, RLC
- Active: 1967-present
- Country: United Kingdom
- Branch: British Army
- Role: Logistics
- Size: Regiment; 477 personnel
- Part of: Royal Logistic Corps
- Website: 152 Regiment RLC

152 (North Irish) Regiment RLC is a Northern Irish reserve British Army regiment of the Royal Logistic Corps. The regiment is paired with the regular unit 9 Regiment RLC.

== History ==
The regiment was formed in the Royal Corps of Transport (RCT) in 1967 with two transport squadrons. It was redesignated 152 (Ulster) Ambulance Regiment RCT in the 1980s, and transferred into The Royal Logistic Corps (RLC) in 1993 as 152 (Ulster) Ambulance Regiment RLC. In 1999 it acquired a third squadron from 157 Transport Regiment and was put under the administrative control of the Army Medical Services. In 2006 it re-roled as a transport regiment and was transferred back to control of The Royal Logistic Corps, returning an ambulance squadron to 157 Transport Regiment and acquiring a newly raised third transport squadron.

Under Army 2020 the regiment was paired with 9 Regiment RLC under 102nd Logistic Brigade, while the regiment joins 104th Logistic Support Brigade. As part of this plan, the regiment became a specialist 'Fuel Support' regiment in 2015, the only unit of its type in the army. The regiment also works closely with the Royal Engineers' 516 Specialist Team (Bulk Petroleum).

== Current structure ==
Below is the current structure of the regiment:

- Regimental Headquarters, at Palace Barracks, Holywood
- 227 (Belfast) Headquarters Squadron, at Palace Barracks, Holywood
- 211 (Londonderry) Tanker Squadron, in Derry
  - C (Coleraine) Troop, in Coleraine
- 220 (Belfast) Tanker Squadron, at Palace Barracks, Holywood
- 400 (Belfast) Petroleum Squadron, at Palace Barracks, Holywood
