= HMS Tenby =

Two ships of the Royal Navy have borne the name HMS Tenby, after the Pembrokeshire seaside town of Tenby:

- HMS Tenby (J34) was a Bangor-class minesweeper launched in 1941 and sold in 1948.
- HMS Tenby (F65) was a Whitby-class frigate launched in 1955. She was sold to the Pakistan Navy in 1975 but was not taken up and was sold for scrapping in 1977.
