= 734 Communication Squadron =

- Active: 1970–2011
- Country: Canada
- Branch: Land Force Command
- Garrison/HQ: Regina, Saskatchewan
- Motto(s): Regina Camporum
- March: "Mercury March"

734 Communication Squadron was a reserve military unit in Regina, Saskatchewan, Canada. It was formed by the redesignation of 2nd Independent Signal Squadron on 1 April 1970. The unit's motto was Regina Camporum. In 2011 the squadron was amalgamated with 735 Communication Regiment, 736 Communication Squadron and 737 Communication Squadron, which together became 38 Signal Regiment. The Regina subunit of this regiment is 2 Squadron.

== Role ==
The primary role of 734 Communication Squadron was to augment the Regular Force for both domestic and international operations, including those with the United Nations and NATO. International deployments include most recently Afghanistan, Bosnia and the Golan Heights. Members of the unit also served on PMO taskings.

== Composition ==
734 Communication Squadron was composed mainly of linemen, signal operators, and signal officers as well as support trades: supply technicians, mobile support equipment operators, resource management support clerks and vehicle technicians.
