= 9 Regiment RLC =

- Active: 1993-present
- Country: United Kingdom
- Branch: British Army
- Type: Regiment
- Role: Logistic Support
- Size: Regiment; 659 personnel
- Part of: Royal Logistic Corps
- Garrison/HQ: Buckley Barracks
- Website: 9 Regt RLC

9 Regiment RLC is a regiment of the British Army's Royal Logistic Corps.

== History ==
The regiment was formed on 5 April 1993 and has participated in several conflicts and operations in Northern Ireland, Iraq and Afghanistan.

== Structure ==
It is partnered with 156 Regiment RLC in the UK. The Regiment is made up of five squadrons:

- 90 Headquarter Squadron
- 66 Fuel and General Transport Squadron
- 84 Medical Supply Squadron
- 94 Supply Squadron (Queens Own Gurkha Logistic Regiment)
