= Ministry of Defence Hospital Unit =

UK military healthcare facility

A Ministry of Defence Hospital Unit, or MDHU, is a military healthcare facility embedded within a civilian National Health Service hospital. The United Kingdom Armed Forces no longer run dedicated military hospitals by themselves, the last of such hospitals closing or turned over to the local NHS trust in 1995, though the hospital at RAF Akrotiri, Cyprus, stayed open until 2013. The Defence Medical Services direct the operation of all seven MDHUs in the UK.

There are MDHUs based at:

- Frimley Park Hospital, Frimley, Surrey
- Queen Alexandra Hospital, Portsmouth
- Derriford Hospital, Plymouth
- Queen Elizabeth Hospital Birmingham
- James Cook University Hospital, Middlesbrough
- John Radcliffe Hospital, Oxfordshire
- Queen Victoria Hospital, East Grinstead

The Ministry of Defence (MoD) is also responsible for the Royal Centre for Defence Medicine at Queen Elizabeth Hospital (QEH) in Birmingham. MoD Hospital Units cater to service personnel and their dependents but do not treat operational casualties, who are treated at QEH (and formerly at Selly Oak Hospital).

MoD Hospital Unit staff are fully integrated with civilian staff at their respective hospitals and are not limited to treating only military patients and their dependents. As they are military personnel, they wear their service uniforms to work. Staff are generally drawn from all three services and are liable to be deployed when needed.
