= Wellington West Coast and Taranaki Regiment =

- Active: 1948–2012
- Country: New Zealand
- Branch: New Zealand Army
- Type: Infantry
- Mottos: Ka pai te whakato te purapura ka pai te puawaitanga (Maori: "prepare the seed bed well and the crop will prepare itself")
- March: Battle of the Somme
- Mascots: Ramilies (A Drysdale ram, 1989–1992)
- Anniversaries: Infantry Day - 23 October

Insignia
- Tartan: Black Watch

The Wellington West Coast and Taranaki Regiment was a Territorial Force unit of the New Zealand Army. It was originally formed in 1948 by the amalgamation of two separate regiments:

- Wellington West Coast Regiment (previously the 7th (Wellington West Coast Rifles) Regiment)
- Taranaki Regiment (previously the 11th (Taranaki Rifles) Regiment)

The regiment became a TF battalion of the Royal New Zealand Infantry Regiment in 1964 during the reorganisation of the army. This was until the later reorganisation of 1999, which saw the TF battalions split from the RNZIR to become multi-function battalion groups. The Wellington, West Coast and Taranaki Regiment became the 5th Wellington, West Coast and Taranaki Battalion Group, with the following unit types:

- Engineers – 1 Field Squadron, RNZE
- Infantry
- Medical
- Logistics
- Pipes and Drums of the Wellington West Coast and Taranaki Regiment

In December 2012 the regiment was amalgamated with the 7th Wellington and Hawke's Bay Battalion to form the 5th/7th Battalion, Royal New Zealand Infantry Regiment (5/7 RNZIR).

== Battle honours ==
The following battle honours were authorised to be emblazoned on the colours:

- New Zealand
- South Africa
- First World War:
  - Somme 1916–18,
  - Messines 1917,
  - Ypres 1917,
  - Bapaume 1918,
  - Hindenburg Line,
  - Landing at ANZAC,
  - France and Flanders 1916–1918,
  - Sari Bair 1915,
  - Gallipoli 1915,
  - Egypt 1915–1916
- Second World War:
  - Greece 1941,
  - Crete,
  - Sidi Rezegh 1941,
  - Minquar Qaim,
  - El Alamein,
  - North Africa 1940–1943,
  - Cassino I,
  - The Senio,
  - Italy 1943–45,
  - Solomons

The regiment is one of two unique regiments of the Commonwealth, in that it is one of two regiments to have its own country's name as a battle honour. This dates from the service of the Taranaki Volunteer Rifle Corps, from which the Taranaki Regiment is descended, during the New Zealand Wars, specifically in the Battle of Waireka.

The other unit to share this honour is the Cape Town Highlanders Regiment, a reserve mechanised unit of South African Army.

== Alliances ==
- United Kingdom – The Middlesex Regiment (1948-1966)
- United Kingdom – The Queen's Regiment (1966-1992)
- United Kingdom – The Royal Hampshire Regiment (1948-1992)
- United Kingdom – The Princess of Wales's Royal Regiment (Queen's and Royal Hampshires) (1992-)

== Freedoms ==
The regiment was granted the following freedoms:

- City of Wanganui (1964)
- City of New Plymouth (1960)
- City of Hawera (1972)
