= HMS Crane =

At least seven vessels of the Royal Navy have borne the name HMS Crane.

- HMS Crane (1590) was a 24-gun ship sold in 1629.
- HMS Crane (1777) was a galley purchased in North America and sold in 1783.
- HMS Crane (1806) was a 4-gun Cuckoo-class schooner wrecked in 1808.
- HMS Crane (1809) was a Cruizer-class brig-sloop launched in 1809. She foundered with the loss of her entire crew in 1814.
- HMS Crane (1839) was a packet brig of 6 guns launched in 1839 and sold in 1862.
- HMS Crane (1896) was a Star-class destroyer launched in 1896 and broken up in 1919 after the end of World War I.
- HMS Crane (U23) was a modified Black Swan-class sloop launched in 1942 and broken up in 1965.
