= Regional Cadet Support Unit (Atlantic) =

Canadian Forces unit

Regional Cadet Support Unit (Atlantic) (RCSU(A)) is the Canadian Forces unit that is responsible for providing support to the Canadian Cadet Organizations (Royal Canadian Sea, Army and Air Cadets) in Canada's Atlantic provinces - Nova Scotia, New Brunswick, Newfoundland and Labrador, and Prince Edward Island. The unit is headquartered at Canadian Force Base Halifax at 12 Wing in Shearwater, Nova Scotia and is an integral unit of National Cadet and Junior Rangers Support Group.

== Leadership ==
The Commanding Officer of RCSU(A) is Lieutenant Colonel Marc-Andre Watier CD. The Chief of Staff is Major Stephen Park, CD and the Coxswain is Chief Petty Officer First Class Daniel Legault, MMM CD. The Deputy Commanding Officer is Maj Shawn Sperry, CD.

== Subordinate units ==
RCSU(A) supports the 240 Cadet Corps and Squadrons located throughout Atlantic Canada, comprising approximately 8,500 cadets. RCSU(A), in conjunction with its Area Offices located in Shearwater, Nova Scotia, St. John's, Newfoundland and Labrador and 5CDSB Gagetown, New Brunswick, and the 1,400 Cadet Instructors Cadre Officers within the region, are responsible for the support, protection, administration, supervision, and training of all cadets throughout the training year and at Cadet Summer Training Centres in the region.

== Cadet Summer Training Centres ==
RCSU(A) is also responsible for the support of the following Cadet Training Centres:

- Argonaut Cadet Training Centre (Argonaut CTC) located at Canadian Forces Base Gagetown in New Brunswick. The Commanding Officer of Argonaut CTC is Cdr Charlotte McAleer
- Greenwood Cadet Training Centre (Greenwood CTC) located at Canadian Forces Base Greenwood in Nova Scotia. The Commanding Officer of Greenwood CTC is LCol Nicole Whiteway

== Regional Cadet Instructor School (Atlantic) ==
The Regional Cadet Instructor School (Atlantic) (RCIS(A)) is the training school for officers of the Cadet Instructors Cadre in the Atlantic Region. RCIS(A) is headquartered at Canadian Force Base Halifax on the lower base at Shearwater, Nova Scotia with detachments at CFS St. John's, Newfoundland and Labrador and CFB Gagetown, New Brunswick. The Commandant of RCIS(A) is Major John F. Cater, CD.

== Notable events ==
On January 15, 2009, Her Excellency, the Right Honourable Michaëlle Jean, the Governor General of Canada, approved a heraldic badge for RCSU(A). The badge was officially unveiled on June 3, 2009 in a ceremony presided over by Her Honour, the Honourable Mayann Francis, Lieutenant Governor of Nova Scotia.

RCSU(A) participated actively in the 2009 centennial celebrations for the Flight of the Silver Dart and the Cadet Instructors Cadre branch. In 2010, RCSU(A) took part in various events associated with the Canadian Naval Centennial celebrations, including the International Fleet Review and Royal Visit of Her Majesty, Queen Elizabeth II in Halifax, Nova Scotia.

RCSU(A) was successful in managing a 2009 outbreak of Influenza A virus subtype H1N1 at the Argonaut Army Cadet Summer Training Centre at CFB Gagetown. The training centre's Commanding Officer, Lieutenant-Colonel Kenneth Fells, the RCSU(A) Public Affairs Officer, Captain Doug Keirstead, and the staff of the training centre's medical clinic were commended by Vice-Admiral Paul Maddison, who was then Commander of Maritime Forces Atlantic, for their actions in the successful management of the outbreak, which was later the subject of a clinical and epidemiologic case-control study by the Public Health Agency of Canada. RCSU(A) staff were praised by local media for their handling of the outbreak in the July 30, 2009 edition of the Fredericton Daily Gleaner.
