= HMS Sherwood =

A ship and a shore establishment of the Royal Navy have borne the name HMS Sherwood:

- HMS Sherwood (I80), previously USS Rodgers was transferred from the United States Navy as part of the 1940 Destroyers for Bases Agreement, and was in service with the Royal Navy (1940–1945)
- HMS Sherwood (shore establishment) is a Royal Naval Reserve facility that was commissioned in 1984
