= St John Ambulance Northern Ireland =

First aid organisation based in Northern Ireland

- Abbreviation: SJANI
- Founded: 1881
- Type: Non-governmental, charitable voluntary organisation
- Registration no.: NIC103839
- Location: 35 Knockbracken Healthcare Park, Saintfield Road, Belfast, BT8 8RA
- Coordinates: 54°32′09″N 5°54′29″W
- Origins: St John Ambulance
- Services: Community service; Emergency medical services; Youth programmes
- Key people: Paul Archer (Director); James Johnston (Director)
- Website: sjani.org

St John Ambulance Northern Ireland (SJANI) is a voluntary organisation based in Northern Ireland. It teaches both adults and children first aid, provides services at public events and prepares first responders what to do in emergencies. It also provides courses for young adults (known as cadets), teaching them what to do in an emergency, as well as teaching communication, recording and observation skills.

The organisation is based in Northern Ireland and is a commandery in the international St John Ambulance movement and is a registered charity under the Charity Commission for Northern Ireland's register.
