= 156 Regiment RLC =

- Active: 1967-Present
- Country: United Kingdom
- Branch: British Army
- Role: Logistics
- Size: Regiment; 480 personnel
- Part of: Royal Logistic Corps
- Website: 156 Regiment RLC

Commanders
- Honorary Colonel: John-Joseph Calvert (2026)

156 Regiment RLC is an Army Reserve Regiment of the British Army's Royal Logistic Corps.

== History ==
The Regiment was first formed in the Royal Corps of Transport as 156th (Lancashire and Cheshire) Regiment, RCT (Volunteers) in 1967. 238 Squadron was formed in 1969 and the regiment was renamed as 156th (Merseyside and Greater Manchester) Transport Regiment, RCT (Volunteers) in 1980 and 156th (North West) Transport Regiment, RLC (Volunteers) in 1993.

156 Transport Regiment was re-rolled in 2014 and is now a Supply Regiment within 101 Logistics Brigade.

== Structure ==
The current structure is as follows:

- Regimental Headquarters and 235 Headquarters Squadron, in Liverpool
- 234 (Wirral) Supply Squadron, in Oxton
- 236 (Manchester) Supply Squadron, in Salford, Manchester
  - Manx Troop, in Douglas, Isle of Man
- 238 (Sefton) Supply Squadron, in Bootle
- 381 (Lancaster) Supply Squadron, at Alexandra Barracks, Lancaster
