= John Buckley (VC) =

English recipient of the Victoria Cross (1813–1876)

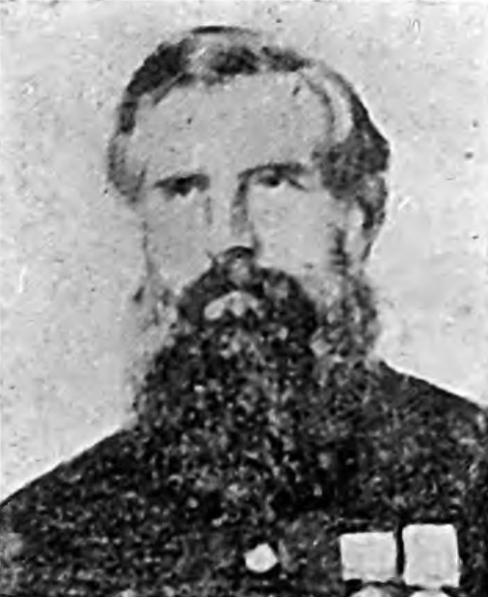
- Buckley as featured in The V.C. and D.S.O. (1924)
- Born: 24 May 1813; Stalybridge, Cheshire
- Died: 14 July 1876 (aged 63); Poplar, London
- Burial place: Tower Hamlets Cemetery
- Military career
- Allegiance: United Kingdom; East India Company
- Branch: Bengal Army; British Indian Army
- Service years: 1832–1861
- Rank: Major
- Conflicts: Indian Mutiny
- Awards: Victoria Cross

Major John Buckley VC (24 May 1813 – 14 July 1876) was an English recipient of the Victoria Cross. He was the 115th recipient of the award and the first of 182 awarded during the Indian Mutiny (1358 have been awarded in total).

== Early life ==
Buckley was born in a cottage on Cocker Hill in Stalybridge, Cheshire on 24 May 1813 and was baptised in Old St George's Church. His early employment was in the textile industry, working locally at Harrison's Mill and then Bayley's Mill. Recognising that his ambitions went beyond mill work, Buckley left home at Christmas 1831 to travel to Manchester, where he enlisted at the Recruiting Office into the Bengal Artillery. He joined the Regiment as a Gunner at Chatham and on 20 June 1832 he embarked on HMS Layton at Gravesend to join his unit in India.

He married Mary Ann Broadway on 28 July 1835 at Chunar, India. He was then stationed at Fort William, Calcutta. By 1845, his wife and two of his three children had died of tropical disease. He then married Esther Hunter at Allahabad, India on 17 August 1846. In 1852 the surviving daughter from his first marriage died, and in the following year two sons by his second marriage also died.

He was promoted Corporal on 31 August 1840, Sergeant on 1 September 1853, and being able to speak several Indian dialects he gained a position with the Bengal Veterans' Establishment as a Sub-Conductor on 21 April 1854. He was appointed Staff Conductor on 26 May 1856, and in 1857 he took his wife and three surviving children to Delhi, where he became Assistant Commissary of Ordnance and was employed at the Great Magazine, a storehouse for guns and ammunition.

== Defence of the Magazine at Delhi ==
Buckley was 43 years old, and a Deputy Assistant Commissary of Ordnance in the Commissariat Department (Bengal Establishment) of the British East India Company during the Indian Mutiny when the following took place on 11 May 1857 at Delhi, India for which he was awarded the VC. Deputy Assistant Commissary Buckley was one of nine men who defended the ammunition storehouse for more than five hours against large numbers of mutineers. When the wall was being scaled and hope of outside help was gone, they blew up the ammunition, killing many of the mutineers. Of the defenders, five died in the explosion and one shortly afterwards, while Buckley, George Forrest, and William Raynor survived. His citation in the London Gazette reads:

For gallant conduct in the defence of the Magazine at Delhi, on the 11th May, 1857.

== Remaining life ==
He was captured by the enemy and soon learnt that his entire family had been ruthlessly murdered by the rebels. He had now lost two wives and eight children in total and wanted to live no longer. He begged for death from his captors but they refused to kill him on account of his bravery at the magazine.

On escaping to the British lines he volunteered for every dangerous mission he could in order to vent his anger and seek revenge. He was present at the Battle of Badli-ki-Serai on 8 June 1857, and three attacks of sunstroke left him weak and ill, but he survived. He was then appointed Provost Marshal at Meerut, where one of his duties was to superintend the execution of 150 rebels. He devised their punishment of being strapped to the muzzle of a cannon and blown apart. Buckley was promoted to Lieutenant on 18 October 1858. He became ill again and the Medical Board at Fort William, Calcutta, granted him two years leave. He departed for Britain on 21 May 1858 and arrived home on 6 July.

John Buckley was invested with his Victoria Cross by Queen Victoria on 2 August 1858 during a parade of the garrison on Southsea Common, Portsmouth.

He returned to Stalybridge in September 1858, but soon left again for India. Buckley retired as a Major on 1 October 1861, returned to England and lived for many years with his final wife, Sara, at 213 East India Dock Road, Poplar until his death on 14 July 1876, aged 63. Living in relative "poverty and obscurity" at the time of his death, he was buried in an unmarked grave at the nearby Tower Hamlets Cemetery.

== The medal ==
Buckley has no direct descendants but a great-niece survived until 1955, at which time his VC was purchased by the Royal Army Ordnance Corps for £11,000. His Victoria Cross is displayed at the Royal Logistic Corps Museum at Worthy Down, Hampshire.

== Commemorations ==
A blue plaque to commemorate Buckley's life is sited at the Travellers Call public house in Stalybridge.

Buckley Barracks, home of 9 Regiment Royal Logistic Corps (formed from the amalgamation of the RAOC/RCT) at Hullavington, Wiltshire was renamed after him in 2003.

Buckley House, the official residence of the commander of the Defence Storage and Distribution Centre at Bicester, is also named after Buckley.

Buckley's grave in Tower Hamlets Cemetery was left unmarked for 136 years, until a volunteer with the Friends of Tower Hamlets Cemetery Park (the cemetery was renamed and repurposed in the 1990s) found it in 2012, having cross-referenced the cemetery's burial records against Army archives. The grave was marked with a headstone in a ceremony on 14 July 2014, which was attended by Jim Fitzpatrick MP, soldiers from 9 Regiment Royal Logistic Corps, and the Victoria Cross Trust.
