= Michael Murphy (VC) =

Irish recipient of the Victoria Cross (died 1893)

Michael Murphy VC
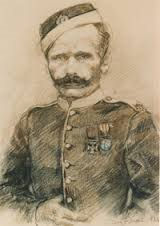
- Born: c. 1837; Cahir, County Tipperary, Ireland
- Died: 4 April 1893 (aged 55–56); Darlington, County Durham, England
- Spouse: Mary Fox (m. 1860–1893)
- Military career
- Allegiance: United Kingdom
- Branch: British Army
- Service years: 27 August 1855 – 1 February 1875
- Rank: Farrier-Major
- Units: Military Train
- Conflicts: Indian Mutiny
- Awards: Victoria Cross (forfeited)
- Other work: Blacksmith, labourer

Michael Murphy VC (c. 1837 – 4 April 1893) was an Irish recipient of the Victoria Cross (VC), the highest award for gallantry in the face of the enemy that can be awarded to British and other Commonwealth forces.

Murphy was born c. 1837 in Cahir, County Tipperary, to Michael Murphy, a local blacksmith, and his (unknown) wife. He had at least two younger sisters, named Mary and Julia Mary. Little is known about his early life until 1855, when he started his army career.

== Army career ==
=== Early career ===
On 27 August 1855, Murphy enlisted in the 17th Lancers at Cork. The 17th Lancers, however, were still at the Crimean War, having lost most of their complement in the Charge of the Light Brigade in the previous year. As a result, Murphy started his training with the 16th Lancers at the Portobello Barracks, Dublin.

On 22 May 1856, Murphy attached to the 17th Lancers, who were now en route from the Crimea, via Ismid in Turkey, to help contain the early stages of the Indian Mutiny. It seems he intended to catch up with his regiment in India. Something must have affected this plan, since on 18 October 1856, he joined the 2nd Battalion Military Train (later the Royal Army Service Corps and nowadays the Royal Logistic Corps) instead. In March 1857, Murphy left the Curragh Camp and boarded the steamer Calypso at Dublin bound for Woolwich. On 28 April, he embarked for Hong Kong. On reaching the Dutch East Indies, the battalion was diverted to Calcutta on news of the Indian Mutiny. They arrived in Calcutta on 27 August, and after a series of moves were deployed to relieve Lucknow. The battalion was subsumed into the Azimghur Field Force on 29 March 1858.

=== Victoria Cross ===
On 15 April 1858, Murphy was in position at Nathupur, near Azimgurh, in north-east India. During the fighting, Murphy and Private Samuel Morley were severely wounded while defending an injured comrade, Lieutenant Hamilton, adjutant of the 3rd Sikh Cavalry. Hamilton died from his injuries the next evening, but for his actions Murphy was awarded the Victoria Cross:

War-Office, 27th May, 1859.

THE Queen has been graciously pleased to signify Her intention to confer the decoration of the Victoria Cross on the undermentioned Non-commissioned Officers and Privates of Her Majesty's Army, whose claims to the same have, been submitted for Her Majesty's approval, on account of Acts of Bravery performed by them in India, as recorded against their several names; viz. :

2nd Battalion, Military Train, Private Michael Murphy, (Farrier)

Date of Act of Bravery, 15th April, 1858.

For daring gallantry on the 15th April, 1858, when engaged in the pursuit of Kooer Singh's Army from Aziraghur, in having rescued Lieutenant Hamilton, Adjutant of the 3rd Sikh Cavalry, who was wounded, dismounted and surrounded by the enemy. Farrier Murphy cut down several men, and, although himself severely wounded, he never left Lieutenant Hamilton's side, until support arrived.

Queen Victoria presented Michael Murphy with his Victoria Cross at the Quadrangle, Windsor Castle on 4 January 1860. Recognition for Morley did not come until later.

=== Return to the UK ===
After his injuries at Nathupur, Murphy was invalided to Calcutta and returned to the United Kingdom and the Invalid Depot, Great Yarmouth. On 14 May 1859, he resumed his duties at the Depot, at Aldershot and returned to the 2nd Battalion on 1 October 1859. On 7 April 1860, he married at Aldershot and his new wife and two children joined him in establishment accommodation the same day. Murphy was soon promoted to Farrier Sergeant, and moved to Woolwich. In January 1862, Murphy was attached to the 1st Battalion and served 5 months in Canada, returning on 14 June 1862 to Woolwich and then onto Aldershot. On 21 March 1865, Murphy transferred to the 6th Battalion and moved to the Royal Military College, Sandhurst. On 6 September of the following year, Murphy rejoined the Military Train at the Curragh in Ireland. By 1868, he was back at Woolwich with his wife and two children. By the time the Military Train became the Army Service Corps in 1869, Murphy had achieved the rank of Farrier-Major and was stationed in Aldershot. On 1 July 1871, Murphy transferred from the Army Service Corps to the 7th Hussars.

=== Forfeiture ===
On 26 January 1872, a civilian, James Green, was stopped by Farrier-Major Knott at Aldershot with a wagon containing sacks of oats and hay. Green stated that Murphy had given him permission to remove these goods. Murphy and Green were then arrested for the theft of these goods. At the trial at Winchester, Green was acquitted and released, but Murphy was convicted and sentenced to nine months' hard labour at the House of Correction for the county of Hampshire. On 5 March, an order was issued for the forfeit of Murphy's VC. Murphy was one of only eight men who forfeited their Victoria Crosses. Although Murphy had worn his Victoria Cross every day during his trial, the medal could not be found after the forfeiture order. His wife Mary and their child had disappeared from their Army establishment accommodation. After Murphy was released from prison on 30 November 1872, he returned to his regiment at Hounslow. His wife and children returned to Army establishment in December 1873.

His medal re-appeared 26 years later.

=== Later career and discharge ===
During 1873, Murphy's battalion moved to Wimbledon and then Maidstone. Murphy was in hospital and did not move with his battalion when it moved to Norwich in June 1874. On 7 December 1874, Murphy was transferred to the 9th Lancers. In January 1875, the 9th Lancers were sent to Bombay, but Murphy reattached to the 5th Lancers returning from India.

On 1 February 1875, after almost 20 years army service, Murphy was discharged at Colchester.

== Post-military life and death ==
Immediately following his army discharge, Murphy took up residence in Bellingham, Northumberland. From Bellingham, he moved by early 1876 to become a blacksmith at Scotswood, Newcastle upon Tyne, Northumberland. then by mid-1878 to Murton, County Durham, and, by 1881, back to Heworth, Northumberland.

During the 1880s, Murphy's children appear to have left home. In 1889, while staying at Wilton Lodge, Darlington, Murphy's wife was admitted to Winterton Asylum, Sedgefield, where she later died on 3 March 1900. By 1891, Murphy had moved on his own to a cottage on the Blackwell Grange estate, outside Darlington (owned by a benefactor, Sir Henry Havelock-Allan, another Victoria Cross recipient). Murphy later relocated to Darlington to work as a labourer in an ironworks.

Murphy died of pneumonia at 22 Vulcan Street, Darlington on 4 April 1893. He was buried in the North Road Municipal Cemetery, Darlington. A gravestone was erected by Sir Henry and comrades from the India campaign. Despite having at least two children still alive but not at home, his sole heir was stated to be his married niece Bridget Mary Anne Dobson, who was caring for, and residing with, him at the end. Murphy's epitaph records that three of his sons were killed in action.

=== Reappearance of medal ===
It is not known where the medal was kept between March 1872 and June 1898, nor who held possession. However, five years after Murphy's death, in June 1898, his Victoria Cross medal eventually resurfaced when it was offered by an anonymous seller at auction. It was bought by Master Sergeant Masterman on behalf of the Army Service Corps, at Aldershot. This medal was presented to the RASC, which has since been subsumed into the Royal Logistic Corps, based at the Princess Royal Barracks, Deepcut, Surrey. Murphy's actual medal is now owned by a regimental trust and can be viewed, but only by prior arrangement with the Royal Logistic Corps Museum.

=== Commemoration ===
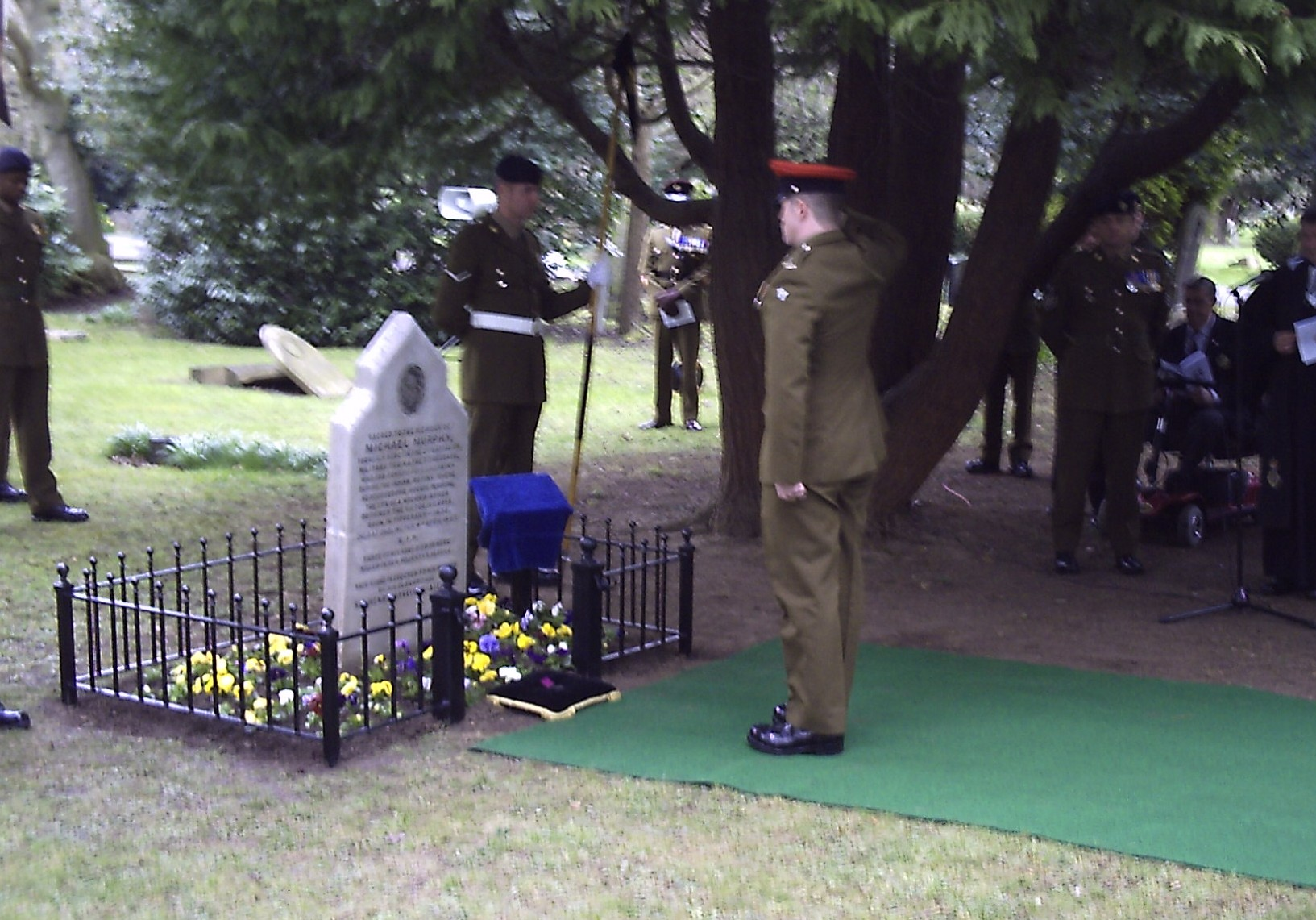
Trooper James Howell presents the Victoria Cross at the grave of his great great great grandfather, Michael Murphy, on the 150th anniversary - 15 April 2008

The 150th anniversary of Murphy's VC occurred on 15 April 2008, and was commemorated at his grave in Darlington by the RLC, with the Mayor of Darlington, numerous family members and the British Legion present.

== Family ==
Murphy married Mary Fox (c. 1841, Ireland – 9 March 1900) at the Farnham Register Office, nr Aldershot, on 7 April 1860. One or both of them may have had previous children, or may have been caring for family or army children, since the army records state that they went onto army establishment the very same day with two children or stepchildren, aged 1 and 5.

Subsequently, they had at least three children together:

1. Edward John Murphy (b. 10 January 1864, Aldershot Camp – alive at 1881 census – d. unknown)
2. George Frederick William Murphy (15 December 1875, Scotswood, Northumberland – 1954, Hoddesdon, Hertfordshire)
3. Mary Ann Murphy (15 May 1878, Murton Colliery, County Durham – alive at 1911 census – d. unknown)

These three children—and no others—appear in the civilian records (BMD, census, etc.). Despite this, Murphy's epitaph stated that "Three of his sons died or were killed in Her Majesty's service" before 1893. It is known that his son George died in 1954, and that Mary Ann and her family survived into the 20th century, so his son Edward John Murphy and two further stepsons must have died before 1893. The army records suggest that these deaths may have been:

- James Ballard, an alleged stepson of Murphy and a colour-sergeant of the 1st Battalion 24th Regiment of Foot who was killed at the Battle of Isandlwana on 22 January 1879
- A sergeant of artillery who was killed at Tel-el-Kebir on 13 September 1882
- A corporal of the Durham Light Infantry who died on the Nile in 1885.

The exact identity and fate of all his children are not known; nor is the connection to his niece Bridget Dobson.

== Medal entitlement ==
Murphy was entitled to the following medals:

Ribbon	Description	Notes
	Victoria Cross (VC)	1858
	Indian Mutiny Medal	1858

== See also ==
- The Register of the Victoria Cross (1981, 1988 and 1997)
