= RCL =

RCL may refer to:

- Radial collateral ligament, one of three ligaments in the upper limb on the side of the radius bone:
  - Radial collateral ligament of elbow joint
  - Radial collateral ligament of thumb
  - Radial collateral ligament of wrist joint
- Ramped Cargo Lighter, Canadian built landing craft of WW2
- Ramped Craft Logistic, Landing craft operated by the Royal Logistic Corps of the British Army
- Ramsey County Library, Minnesota, United States
- RC Lens (Racing Club de Lens), a French Ligue 1 football team
- Recoilless rifle
- Reliance Capital Limited, an Indian financial services company
- Revised Common Lectionary, in Christianity, a set of readings
- Revolutionary Communist League (disambiguation), various political parties
- RLC circuit, an electrical circuit with resistor, inductor, and capacitor, sometimes referred to as an RCL circuit
- Robot Combat League, TV show of robot fighting competitions
- Royal Canadian Legion, an ex-servicemen's organisation
- Royal Caribbean Group (NYSE ticker code RCL), a holding company owning cruise lines
- Rugby Club Luxembourg, a rugby union club in Luxembourg City
