= Mark Underhill =

British Army officer

- Born: 1959–1960
- Alma mater: King William's College
- Military career
- Allegiance: United Kingdom
- Branch: British Army
- Service years: 1978 – 2013
- Rank: Colonel
- Service number: 507550
- Units: Royal Corps of Transport; Royal Logistic Corps
- Commands: Royal Logistic Corps TA
- Awards: Officer of the Order of the British Empire

Colonel Mark Charles Heath Underhill, OBE, DL (born c. 1960) is a retired British Army officer, and a Deputy Lieutenant of Merseyside. He retired as the Chief Executive of the North West Reserve Forces and Cadets Association in February 2025. Underhill is a Deputy Lieutenant of Merseyside and is Also Chair of the Duchy of Lancaster Benevolent Fund, A charity set up in 1993 with the consent of Elizabeth II to support local good causes and community initiatives within the north west

== Military career ==
Underhill commissioned from the Royal Military Academy Sandhurst on 7 April 1979, into the Royal Corps of Transport, initially on a short service commission. He was promoted to lieutenant on 7 April 1981, and after spending time as a troop commander in the Gurkha Transport Regiment in Hong Kong, he completed the Regular Careers Course and was once more promoted to captain on 7 October 1985. Upon promotion to major on 30 September 1990, Underhill returned to Hong Kong in command of a squadron, and deployed with the UN as part of the United Nations Peacekeeping Force in Cyprus. After transferring to the Royal Logistic Corps upon its formation in April 1993, he once more returned to Hong Kong as the second-in-command of the newly raised Hong Kong Logistic Support Regiment RLC. Promotion to lieutenant colonel then followed on 30 June 2000, along with the role of overseeing the formation of the tri-Service International Military Advisory and Training Team (Sierra Leone). After a posting at the Defence Transport and Movements Agency; and as Commander of Logistic Support, London District; Underhill was once more promoted to colonel on 30 June 2007, and took up the role of commander the Royal Logistic Corps Territorial Army.

As a staff officer, Underhill served as the Assistant Head for Operational Energy Management of the Defence Fuels Group; Commander, Logistic Support & Infrastructure at 4th Division; and finally as the Assistant Chief of Staff for Support, at Headquarters Support Command. Underhill retired in 2013, at the rank of Colonel.

Underhill has been Deputy Lieutenant of Merseyside since 2019; the Honorary Colonel of 158 Regiment RLC since 2013; and the Honorary Life President of the Army Rugby Union since 2016. He was, until his retirement in February 2025, the Chief Executive of the North West Reserve Forces and Cadets Association.

Underhill was appointed an MBE in the 2000 Queen's Birthday Honours. He was further advanced to an OBE in the Operation TELIC honours list in 2003.

== Personal life ==
Underhill is married to Debbie and they have two adult children.
