= 7 Regiment RLC =

British Army Royal Logistic Corps regiment

- Active: 1961 – present
- Country: United Kingdom
- Branch: British Army
- Role: Logistics
- Size: Regiment; 599 personnel
- Part of: 102 Operational Sustainment Brigade
- Garrison/HQ: Dalton Barracks, Abingdon, Oxfordshire
- Engagements: Operation Banner; Operation Granby; Operation Telic; Operation Shader
- Website: 7 Regiment RLC

7 Regiment RLC is a regiment of the British Army's Royal Logistic Corps.

== History ==
7 Tank Transporter Column of the Royal Army Service Corps, was established in 1961, following the expansion of the transportation element of the British Army of the Rhine. In 1965, upon the creation of the Royal Corps of Transport, the unit was re-designated as the 7 Tank Transporter Regiment of the new corps. Upon transferring to the new corps, the regiment consisted of 16 Tank Transporter Squadron, 3 Tank Transporter Squadron, 612 Tank Transporter Unit, 617 Tank Transporter Unit, 607 Mobile Civilian Transport Group, and 625 Mobile Civilian Transport Group; however by 1972, the regiment had been reduced to 3, 16, & 617 Tank Transporter Squadrons. Over the next 30 years, the regiment deployed sub-units on Operation Banner, providing support in Northern Ireland. In 1991, the Regimental Headquarters, with 3 and 16 Squadrons plus 414 Tank Transporter Unit, deployed to Saudi Arabia as part of Operation GRANBY during the liberation of Kuwait. In 1993, the regiment transferred to the newly created Royal Logistic Corps, as 7 Transport Regiment at Antwerp Barracks in Sennelager. The Regiment continued to send sub-units on operations in Northern Ireland and Iraq over the coming years, before being renamed 7 Regiment in 2008. Upon the British Army's return from Germany, the Regiment moved from Catterick Barracks in Bielefeld to Kendrew Barracks in Cottesmore, Rutland. As part of Army 2020 reforms, the Regiment moved to Dalton Barracks in Abingdon, Oxfordshire, England in 2023.

== Structure ==
The Regiment's current structure is as follows:

- 617 Headquarters Squadron
- 9 Transport Squadron
- 68 Supply Squadron
- 17 Transport Squadron
- Light Aid Detachment from the Royal Electrical and Mechanical Engineers

The regiment is paired with 158 Regiment RLC and 159 Regiment RLC for training and mobilisation.
