= Samuel Morley (VC) =

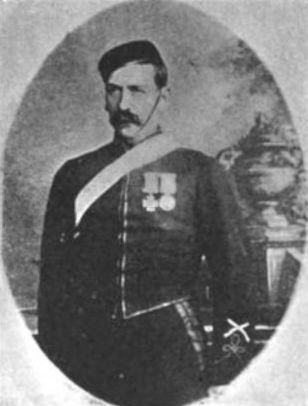
- Born: December 1829; Radcliffe on Trent, Nottingham, England
- Died: 16 June 1888 (aged 58); Nottingham, Nottinghamshire, England
- Burial place: General Cemetery, Nottingham
- Military career
- Allegiance: United Kingdom
- Branch: British Army
- Unit: Military Train
- Conflicts: Indian Mutiny
- Awards: Victoria Cross

Samuel Morley VC (sometimes Morely) (December 1829 – 16 June 1888) was an English recipient of the Victoria Cross ("VC"), the highest and most prestigious award for gallantry in the face of the enemy that can be awarded to British and Commonwealth forces.

== Personal life ==
Samuel Morley was born in December 1829, the son of Francis (a coal higgler) and Mary (née Barratt). He had two sisters (Rebecca and Sarah) and a brother George. (Census 1841 and 1851) Morley was baptized at St Mary's Church, Radcliffe on Trent.

Morley married Mary (born 1844) at some point before 1881.

== Military career ==
=== Crimean War ===
Morley was a private in the 8th Hussars and saw action in the Crimea (1855 to 1856). When he returned to England in 1856 he transferred to the 2nd Battalion, Military Train (later Royal Army Service Corps), British Army. His military career was not spotless: Morley appears sixteen times in the Regimental defaulters book, was court martialled twice and served two terms of imprisonment for absence without leave.

=== Indian Rebellion and Victoria Cross ===
Morley's regiment was deployed to India in 1857. On 15 April 1858, Morley was in position at Nathupur, near Azimgurh, in north-east India. During the fighting, Morley and Farrier Michael Murphy rushed to the aid of Lieutenant Hamilton, adjutant of the 3rd Sikh Cavalry, who had been unhorsed. Hamilton died from his injuries the next evening.

Although Murphy was gazetted and received his VC promptly, Morley did not. In May 1860, after he had returned to England, Morley complained to Lord Alfred Paget who was making his half yearly inspection at Aldershot. Paget ordered an immediate inquiry which resulted in Morley being awarded the VC. The award was announced in the London Gazette on 7 August 1860 and presented on 9 November 1860 by Queen Victoria at Home Park, Windsor.

His citation reads:

2nd Battalion, Military Train, No. 201, Private Samuel Morley

Date of Act of Bravery, April 15, 1858

On the evacuation of Azimgurh by Koer Sing's Army, on the 15th of April, 1858, a Squadron of the Military Train, and half a Troop of Horse Artillery, were sent in pursuit. Upon overtaking them, and coming into action with their rear-guard, a Squadron of the 3rd Seikh Cavalry (also detached in pursuit), and one Troop of the Military Train, were ordered to charge, when Lieutenant Hamilton, who commanded the Seikhs, was unhorsed, and immediately surrounded by the Enemy, who commenced cutting and hacking him whilst on the ground. Private Samuel Morley, seeing the predicament that Lieutenant Hamilton was in, although his (Morley's) horse had been shot from under him, immediately and most gallantly rushed up, on foot, to his assistance, and in conjunction with Farrier Murphy, who has already received the Victoria Cross for the same thing, cut down one of the Sepoys, and fought over Lieutenant Hamilton's body, until further assistance came up, and thereby was the means of saving Lieutenant Hamilton from being killed on the spot.

=== Later army career ===
Morley's discharge papers show he later served in Canada and the East Indies.

== Post-army life ==
Morley was discharged from the army in 1870 after serving 14 years 249 days. He returned to Radcliffe on Trent and worked at the Gas Works in Nottingham. He died on 16 June 1888 at the age of 58 and was buried at the General Cemetery in Nottingham. He is buried with his wife Mary, her second husband and Ann Parnham (his wife's mother).

In 1985, Morley's gravestone was restored and cleaned by the Royal Corps of Transport. Brigadier A F R Evans, Commander Royal Corps of Transport Territorial Army, paid tribute to Morley at a short service attended by the Sheriff, Councillor and Mrs Tom Harby, as well as Morley's descendants. An Honour Guard was provided by the Morley Troop, The Junior Leaders Regiment Royal Corps of Transport, who sounded the Last Post and Reveille.

== Memorials ==
- Morley's Victoria Cross can be viewed by prior arrangement only with the Royal Logistic Corps Museum, Princess Royal Barracks, Deepcut, Camberley, Surrey, England.
- His headstone in Nottingham General Cemetery was paid for by public subscription. It is still in existence.(Grave 9726) Both his interment certificate and headstone show his age as 56. The inscription reads: "In loving memory of Samuel Morley VC who died June 16th 1888, aged 56 years. A Victoria Cross Winner, late of the military train. He won the coveted distinction of the Victoria Cross during the trying days of the Indian Mutiny in those terrible battles that led to the recapture of Lucknow, when the empire of Indian seemed almost to have escaped our grasp, he played a true soldier's part, was present at the siege and fall of Lucknow under Lord Clyde, served with the force at Alum Bagh under General Outram, also with the Azimgurh and Shahabad field force and at the capture of Inundispore (?) when he was engaged several times with the enemy and was wounded at Azimgurh. His horse was killed under him as he was charging with his troop a large body of rebels on 15th of April 1858. In every action in which he was engaged during the rebellion his conduct was that of a cool, brave and gallant soldier."
- He is named on Nottinghamshire Victoria Cross memorial in the grounds of Nottingham Castle (dedicated 7 May 2010).
- Plaque at Grange Hall, Vicarage Lane, Radcliffe-on-Trent, Nottinghamshire.
- A road is named after him in Radcliffe-on-Trent - Morley Gardens.
