= Ramped powered lighter =

Type of landing craft

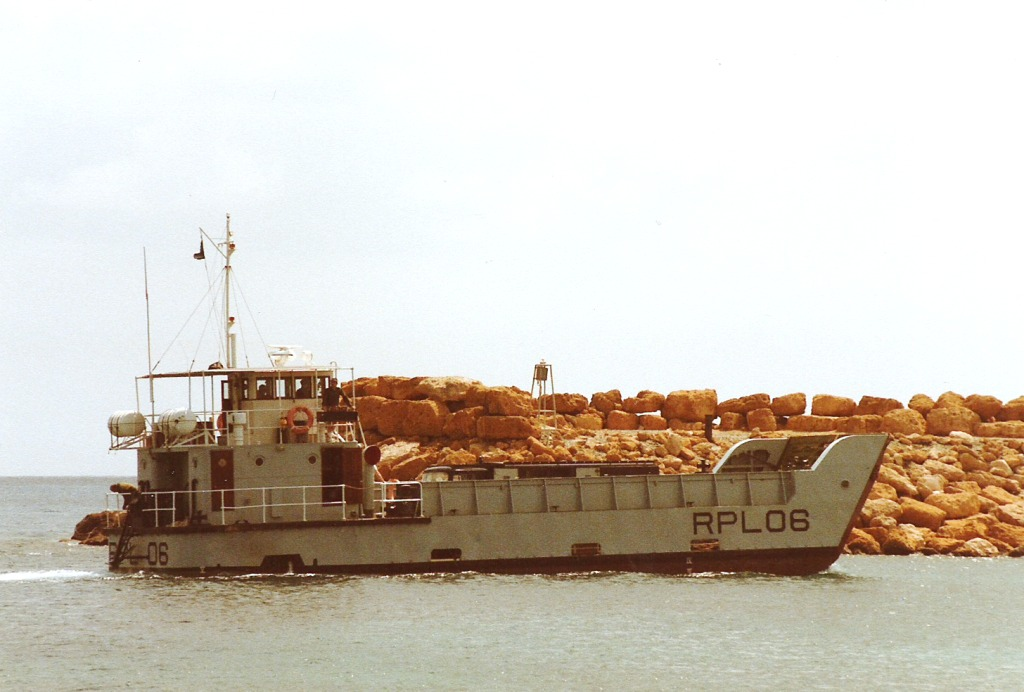
RPL06 entering Akrotiri harbour, Cyprus

The ramped powered lighter (RPL) was a type of landing craft formerly operated by the Royal Corps of Transport of the British Army, from the 1960s until the 1990s. Performing similar tasks to the ramped cargo lighter of the Second World War, it had a vehicle deck that was 5.49 metres (18 ft 0 in) wide and 13.26 metres (43 ft 6 in) long, and a load capacity of 30.5 tonnes (30.0 long tons). From the early 1980s onwards it was replaced with the larger ramped craft logistic (RCL). The last RPL was in service in Belize until the main British Armed Forces presence was withdrawn from there in 1994.
