= 102 Operational Sustainment Brigade =

102nd Operational Sustainment Brigade
- Active: 1993–Present
- Allegiance: United Kingdom
- Branch: British Army
- Role: Combat Service Support
- Size: Brigade
- Part of: 1st (United Kingdom) Division
- Garrison/HQ: Prince William of Gloucester Barracks

Commanders
- Current commander: Brigadier Richard Newland OBE

102 Operational Sustainment Brigade is a logistic brigade of the British Army. The brigade is a light, agile force that moves troops and equipment to the battle area and logistically sustains fighting formations.

== History ==
102 Operational Sustainment Brigade traces its origin to 102 Beach Sub-Area, Normandy, France. It was one of 3 such formations raised late in 1943 to run logistic support operations across Juno Beach, from D-day until the Mulberry artificial harbours were operational. Once the Mulberry harbours were in use, there was no further requirement for the Beach Groups, which then dispersed to their original Lines of Communication roles. In 1993, 50 years after the original formation of 102nd Beach Sub Area, Headquarters Combat Service Support Group (Germany) was established in Gütersloh, Germany.

In July 1999, the formation was re-titled 102nd Logistic Brigade and in October 1999 the Halberd was officially adopted as the formation tactical recognition flash. The Halberd appears in Jeremiah as a symbol of strength, success and restoration. Its interpretation as a restorer of combat power following bloodshed, exhaustion and hunger reflects the operational role of 102nd Logistic Brigade. The dual capability of the Halberd, both as a weapon and a hand tool represents the combination of artisan and technical skills, which complement the military training of Brigade personnel.

Under Future Soldier reforms, the brigade was redesignated 102 Operational Sustainment Brigade, within 1st (UK) Division.

== Structure ==
- 102 Operational Sustainment Brigade, in Grantham
  - 1 Battalion, Royal Electrical and Mechanical Engineers, in Catterick (Force Support)
  - 2 Battalion, Royal Electrical and Mechanical Engineers, in Leuchars (Force Support)
  - 3 Medical Regiment, Royal Army Medical Services, in Catterick
  - 6 Regiment, Royal Logistic Corps, in Dishforth Airfield
  - 7 Regiment, Royal Logistic Corps, in Cottesmore (Force Logistic Regiment; will move to Abingdon in 2023 then Leuchars in 2029)
  - 150 Regiment, Royal Logistic Corps, in Kingston upon Hull (Transport Regiment - Reserve)
  - 154 Regiment, Royal Logistic Corps, in Dunfermline
  - 158 Regiment, Royal Logistic Corps, in Peterborough (Aviation Support Regiment - Reserve)
  - 159 Regiment, Royal Logistic Corps, in Coventry (Supply & Transport Regiment - Reserve)
  - 101 Battalion, Royal Electrical and Mechanical Engineers, in Keynsham (Force Support - Reserve)
  - 102 Battalion, Royal Electrical and Mechanical Engineers, in Newton Aycliffe
