= 6 Regiment RLC =

- Active: 1982 - present
- Country: United Kingdom
- Branch: British Army
- Role: Logistics
- Size: Regiment; 601 personnel
- Part of: 7th Light Mechanised Brigade Combat Team
- Garrison/HQ: Dishforth Airfield
- Engagements: Operation Granby; Operation Telic; Operation Herrick
- Website: 6 Regiment RLC

6 Regiment RLC is a regiment of the Royal Logistic Corps of the British Army, based at Dishforth Airfield in North Yorkshire.

== History ==
=== RAOC ===
The regiment was originally known as the 6th Ordnance Battalion, Royal Army Ordnance Corps. 6th Battalion deployed to the Middle East in 1990-91 as part of 1st Armoured Division for Operation Granby, the Gulf War.

=== RLC ===
In 1993, the battalion became the 6th Supply Regiment of the RLC. In 2003, the regiment deployed to Iraq as part of Operation Telic. In 2008, the regiment deployed to Afghanistan as part of Operation Herrick. In 2008, on return of the regiment from Afghanistan, it was renamed to "6 Regiment." The regiment was part of the 102nd Logistic Brigade, but under Army 2020 it was resubordinated to the 101st Logistic Brigade and was a Theatre Logistic Regiment.

In 2022, the regiment moved from 101st Logistic Brigade to 7th Light Mechanised Brigade Combat Team. The regiments role also changed from TLR (Theatre Logistic Regiment) to CS (Close Support), both changes coming under the Future Soldier programme.

== Structure ==
The regiment's structure is as follows:

- 600 Headquarters Squadron
- 62 Supply Squadron
- 64 Fuel & General Transport Squadron
- 32 Close Support Squadron
- Light Aid Detachment from the Royal Electrical and Mechanical Engineers

6 Regiment is paired with the reserve 159 Regiment RLC.
