= Disappearance of David Leckey and Jonathan Aven =

1969 missing children case in Northern Ireland

David Leckey, aged 11, and Jonathan Aven, aged 14, vanished from their homes in September 1969 and have never been found. The case remains an active missing persons investigation under the Police Service of Northern Ireland's Legacy Investigation Branch. On 21 September 2025, authorities issued a fresh appeal for information regarding the disappearance of two boys from east Belfast nearly six decades earlier.

== The disappearances ==
Locations
1 24 Memel Street where David Leckey disappeared from
2 Sydenham Drive where Jonathan Aven disappeared from

=== David Leckey ===
David Leckey, 11 years old, went missing from his home on Memel Street in east Belfast. According to his family, there was "no indication that he was unhappy or in trouble of any kind and didn't think he would ever have left home". The boy was described as a "home bird" who never ventured far from his local area.

=== Jonathan Aven ===
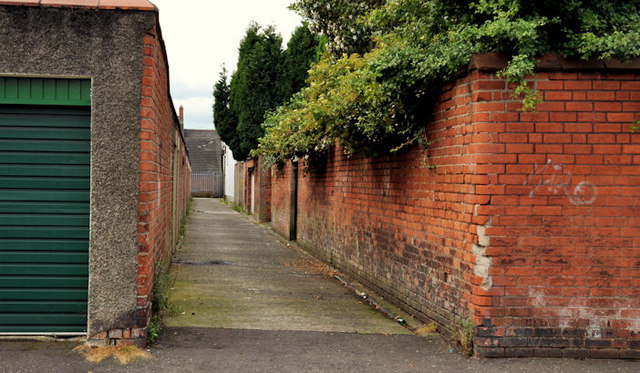
Back entry, Belfast Sydenham Drive

Jonathan Aven, aged 14, disappeared from his home on Sydenham Drive. His father described him as a "happy little boy" who attended Ashfield Boys' School, "which he seemed to like and appeared to be doing well at". Jonathan came from a military family - his father was Sergeant Major Aven of the 43rd Signals, and he had older brothers Christopher, a Royal Marine Section Commander, and Anthony, who served with the Royal Corps of Transport in Berlin.

== Investigation timeline ==
The boys disappeared in September 1969, during the early years of the Northern Ireland conflict known as the Troubles. Initially, authorities treated the cases as linked disappearances, believing the boys had vanished together. However, subsequent investigations raised questions about this assumption.

By February 1970, the Royal Ulster Constabulary (RUC) requested families to search caravans and holiday homes, suggesting authorities believed the boys "may be sleeping in a caravan or holiday residence". Police conducted searches of County Down caravan parks and other locations with no success.

In July 1970, authorities issued fresh appeals, describing the "absolute silence" surrounding the case as unusual, despite regular reports of alleged sightings.

== Evidence of separate cases ==
Contrary to initial assumptions, investigation revealed that David Leckey and Jonathan Aven did not know each other. According to a 1976 report, the boys attended different schools and, as far as David's mother was aware, they had no knowledge of each other. David's father met with the Aven family, and neither could establish any connection between the boys. A former investigating officer noted in 1976 that "the lack of any evidence at all in the case was unusual".

== Current investigation ==
The Police Service of Northern Ireland's Legacy Investigation Branch continues to review the case. Detective Inspector Armstrong stated: "More than 50 years have now passed since both David and Jonathan went missing. Their families have suffered over these years not knowing what happened to them on the day they left their home addresses".

Authorities believe the boys may have boarded a train to Bangor prior to their disappearance. They have appealed to anyone who may have encountered the boys "in any circumstances or location over the past 56 years" to contact investigators.

== Legal representation ==
Belfast law firm KRW Law represents the families of both boys. Solicitor Owen Winters emphasized the need for a "linked approach to the disappearance of Jonathan and David in 1969 together with other similarly themed cases". The firm has been working collaboratively with the PSNI in their investigation established following the broadcast of the "Lost Boys" documentary.

== Historical context ==
The disappearances occurred during a period when multiple children vanished from Belfast streets. Between 1969 and 1974, five boys disappeared within a five-mile radius of the city. The cases were featured in the 2023 documentary "Lost Boys: Belfast's Missing Children," which explored the disappearances of several children during the 1960s and 1970s.

The investigation remains active, with authorities stating they will "consider all investigative opportunities and follow all lines of inquiry as part of the review and will consider any potential criminal offences that may be linked to their disappearance".
