= William Raynor =

Recipient of the Victoria Cross (1795–1860)

- Born: July 1795; Plumtree, Nottinghamshire
- Died: 13 December 1860 (aged 65); Ferozepore, British India
- Burial place: Ferozepore Civil Cemetery
- Military career
- Allegiance: United Kingdom
- Branch: Bengal Army
- Service years: 1812 - 1860
- Rank: Captain
- Conflicts: Gurkha War; Indian Mutiny: Siege of Delhi
- Awards: Victoria Cross

William Raynor VC (July 1795 – 13 December 1860) was an English recipient of the Victoria Cross, the highest and most prestigious award for gallantry in the face of the enemy that can be awarded to British and Commonwealth forces. He is the oldest recipient of the Victoria Cross at 61 years old.

== The Defence of the Magazine at Delhi ==
Raynor was about 61 years old, and a lieutenant in the Bengal Veteran Establishment, Bengal Army during the Indian Mutiny when the following deed took place for which he was awarded the VC.

On 11 May 1857 in the Siege of Delhi, India, Lieutenant Raynor was one of nine men who defended the magazine for more than five hours against large numbers of mutineers. When the wall was being scaled, hope of outside help was gone, they blew up the ammunition, killing many of the mutineers. Of the defenders, five died in the explosion and one shortly afterwards, while Raynor, George Forrest, and John Buckley survived. His citation in the London Gazette reads:

For gallant conduct in the defence of the Magazine at Delhi, on the 11th May, 1857.

== Further information ==
He is thought to be the oldest winner of the VC at 61 years 10 months. He later achieved the rank of captain and died in India.

== The medal ==
His Victoria Cross is displayed at the Royal Logistic Corps Museum, Camberley, Surrey.
