= Deepcut =

Village in Surrey, England

Coordinates: 51.312°N 0.701°W

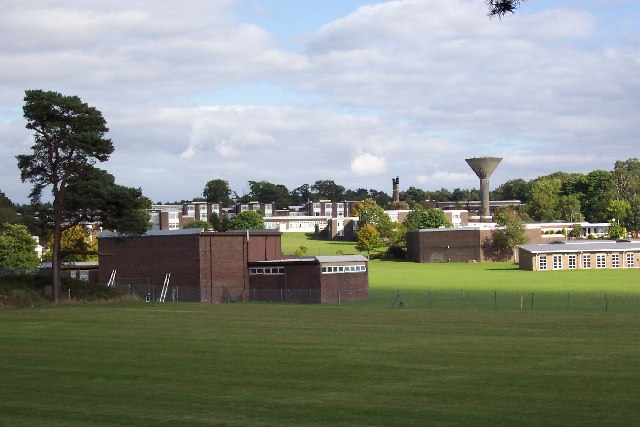
- Army base, 2005

- Location within Surrey
- Population: 2,477 (2011 Census)
- OS grid reference: SU903571
- District: Surrey Heath
- Shire county: Surrey
- Region: South East
- Country: England
- Sovereign state: United Kingdom
- Post town: Camberley
- Postcode district: GU16
- Dialling code: 01276
- Police: Surrey
- Fire: Surrey
- Ambulance: South East Coast
- UK Parliament: Surrey Heath

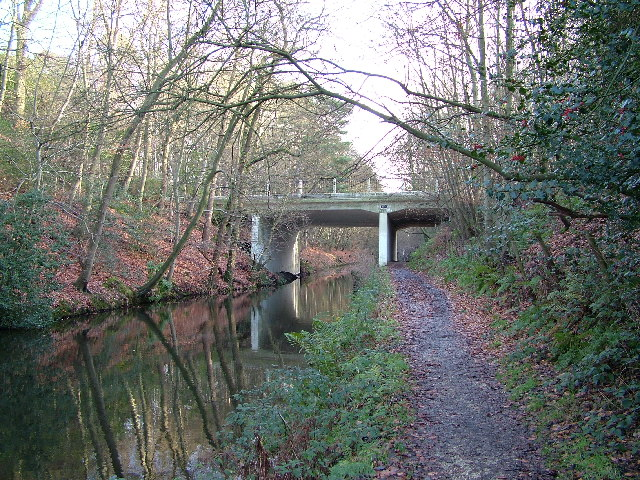
Deepcut bridge over the Basingstoke Canal

Deepcut is a village in the borough of Surrey Heath in Surrey, England, approximately 28 mi (45 km) southwest of central London. The nearest towns are Camberley, Surrey (3 mi (4.8 km) to the north) and Farnborough, Hampshire (3 mi (4.8 km) to the west). Deepcut is named after the excavations required for the building of the Basingstoke Canal during the 1790s, although the village dates primarily from the early 20th century.

Deepcut was the location of the Princess Royal Barracks and its predecessors from 1906 until the barracks was decommissioned after closure was announced in 2013.

The nearest railway stations are Frimley on the line between Ascot and Aldershot, Farnborough North on the North Downs Line and Farnborough (Main) on the South West Main Line.

== History ==
Paleolithic flints have been found in the drift gravels on the hills, and a few neolithic implements in old Frimley parish generically. On the crest on which the community sits, near the southern end of Chobham Ridges, is a very large round barrow called Round Butt; south of it Mainstone Hill probably preserves the name of the Standing Stone, which formed a boundary mark of Chobham in the 12th-century Chertsey charter. William Stukeley's Itinerarium Curiosum records a Roman urn and coins as found here. Deepcut is so named as the Basingstoke Canal was constructed through the area in a deep cutting below ground level, in the 18th century. Deepcut was part of the parish of Ash until 1866, when Frimley gained its own civil and ecclesiastical parishes. Due to non-agricultural soil and undulating landscape leading to little transport infrastructure few people lived here. The parish provided the traditional community structures of church, particularly vestry, and the increasingly redundant rights and functions of manors. Frimley and Ash manors were among the major landholdings whose owners could acquire the common land covering almost the entire area in 1801 and 1826.

In 1537 the abbey granted Ash with its other lands to Henry VIII. Edward VI, however, shortly after his accession granted it to Winchester College, which held the adjoining lands to the south, Ash Manor, in 1911.

Deepcut from 1894 was in the administrative area Frimley and Camberley Urban District until the establishment of Surrey Heath in 1974. Blackdown camp, which became the Deepcut barracks was established by the Royal Engineers in late 1903 to accommodate artillery and infantry, centred on Winchester House, renamed Blackdown House when it was bought from the Pain family of Frimley Green by the War Office for military use.

The Victoria County History (1911) provides an overview of all parts of the country and of Frimley only surrounding features of the parish gained a mention, including the prehistoric artefacts above:

[Frimley] contains 7,800 acres, and measures 4 miles from north to south, and 3 miles from east to west. The parish covers the western side of Chobham Ridges, and extends down into the valley of the Blackwater, which bounds the county. The soil is, therefore, Bagshot sand and alluvium, with patches of gravel and large beds of peat. In the latter conifers and rhododendrons flourish...The Heatherside Nurseries, where are some of the finest Wellingtonias in England, may be taken as the typical industry of the neighbourhood, which is otherwise a residential district, or occupied by those connected with Aldershot, the Staff College, which is in the parish, and Sandhurst which lies just outside it. A very great part of the parish was open land, heather-covered, before the Inclosure Act of 1801. (Note: Frimley Inclosure Act 1801 (41 Geo. 3. (U.K.) c. 123 Pr.)) Much of it is still uncultivated. The main road from London to Southampton crosses the northern part of the parish. It is substantially on the line of the Roman road. On the top of the hill, near the Golden Farmer Inn, named after a notorious highwayman, the road to Farnham branches south from it, and passes through Old Frimley village

== Economy ==
Deepcut had a major training base of the British army employing 441 persons at the time of the 2011 census. Its trainee-level and logistics military community accounted for 31.4% of the engaged workforce.

The only other sectors of employment in 2001 with more than 100 workers were Wholesale and Retail Trade; Repair of Motor Vehicles and Motor Cycles and Human Health and Social Work and Activities.

== Village hall ==
The Deepcut Village Centre is the main community building. It hosts a number of local voluntary community groups and exercise classes. The village hall is used for classes and performances by the Surrey Performing Arts School for Dance, Drama and Musical Theatre.

== Geography ==
=== Elevations ===
In common with Camberley, the village is high on the long north–south crest of the Chobham Ridges. The crest stretches from the Berkshire border at Swinley Forest in the north, to the east of Mytchett in the south, at the southern end of the borough. As such the settled part of the village is at 90-115m AOD.

=== Watercourses ===
As a high watershed on mostly permeable soil, the crest drains mostly below ground into the Blackwater or the River Bourne, Addlestone, depending if land is sloped towards the east or the west of the village. The south of the community is bisected by the Basingstoke Canal which has a cycle and pedestrian route alongside (its towpath).

=== Soil ===
The soil here is naturally wet acid and sandy soil, producing heath vegetation such as coniferous trees, ericaceae and gorse which accounts for less than 2.5% of English soil.

== Notable residents ==
Malacologist Major Matthew Connolly lived at Lock House at Deepcut where he brought up his son, writer and literary critic Cyril Connolly.

English/American singer Graham Parker was raised in the area and named his 2001 studio album Deepcut to Nowhere.

Dame Ethel Smyth, 1858 to 1944, notable and feisty Suffragette who was imprisoned for campaigning and who wrote the Suffragette song, "March of the Women", in 1911. Also composer of operas and author.

Marie Spartali Stillman, 1844–1927, Pre-Raphaelite artist and model. A pupil of Ford Madox Brown, she became a regular model for Edward Burne-Jones and Dante Gabriel Rossetti, but was also a prolific and talented artist in her own right. Lived in Deepcut between 1898 and about 1910 at a house called Deepdene, now renamed Longwood.

William James Stillman, 1898–1901, an American with a varied career, starting as an artist and associate of John Ruskin and then becoming a diplomat for the US government as an envoy to the Balkans. Later a foreign correspondent for The Times. Lived his later years and died in Deepcut at a house called Deepdene, now renamed Longwood, which was designed by notable London architects Treadwell and Martin and commissioned by Stillman's daughter, Bella Middleton in about 1986.

== Deepcut barrack deaths 1995–2002 and the play Deep Cut ==
From 1995 to 2002 a series of four deaths in seven years, each of gunshot wounds (Coroner's Inquest verdict: suicide in the case of Sean Benton, open verdicts in the three other cases), at the Princess Royal Barracks made headlines in most national newspapers and television news broadcasts, when an investigation into any possible links was being launched. The unusual frequency of deaths in one British army facility prompted a series of investigations and findings of breach of duty of care in training contributing to the deaths and after many reviews and investigations an Army Board of Inquiry Report, 2009 confirmed there were breaches of care that contributed towards the opportunity and motive for such deaths and, accordingly, overturned the Coroners and produced open verdicts. Deep Cut, a 2008 play by Philip Ralph, is based on families' and fellow trainees' accounts.

In 2013, following the Defence Training Review and the merger of tri-service training to a single location, it was confirmed that the barracks were to close with the land being released for housing development. Part of the barracks has been demolished to facilitate the construction of 1,200 homes in the Mindenhurst neighbourhood.

== Demography ==
The population of 2,477 lived in 803 households at the time of the United Kingdom Census 2011 of which 61.1% were in very good health and 3% of the population were unemployed. Reflecting a slight gender skew in the main sector of employment at the Princess Royal Barracks (as female longevity was higher than male longevity at the time of the census) 1,296 of the population were men, the remaining 1,181 were women.

=== Main ethnic groups ===
Ethnicity	Deepcut	Surrey Heath	South East	England
White: English/Welsh/Scottish/Northern Irish/British	82.3	84.9	85.2	79.8
Asian/Asian British: Other Asian	4.1	2.5	1.4	1.5
Black/African/Caribbean/Black British; African	1.9	0.6	1.0	1.8
Other Ethnic Group; Any Other Ethnic Group	1.4	0.5	0.4	0.6
Asian/Asian British: Indian (Persons)	1.5	2.0	1.8	2.6

== Politics ==
In local government, the relevant ward is Mytchett and Deepcut, represented by three councillors at the Borough Council of Surrey Heath, above which tier, one councillor represents the area at Surrey County Council, who are responsible for roads, public drainage, certain schools and other major infrastructure and services. The county council division is Frimley Green and Mytchett.
