= George William Forrest =

British government official (1845–1926)

Sir George William David Starck Forrest CIE
- Born: 8 January 1845; Nusseerabad, Bombay Presidency
- Died: 28 January 1926 (aged 81); Oxford, England
- Education: St John's College, Cambridge
- Occupations: Official, journalist and historian
- Father: George Forrest

Sir George William David Stark Forrest (1845–1926) was a British official, journalist and historian, in India from 1872 to 1900.

== Life ==
He was the second son of George Forrest VC, born at Nasirabad, Ajmer. He matriculated at St John's College, Cambridge in 1866, graduating B.A. in 1870. He entered the Inner Temple in 1872, but was not called to the bar. He began to write for periodicals including the Saturday Review. As a journalist, he was known for work published in The Times, particularly a scoop in 1880 with the Battle of Maiwand.

Forrest was appointed to Bombay Educational Department, late in 1872. He was Census Commissioner at Bombay in 1882. He was seconded to work on the Bombay Records, 1884-8, becoming Professor of English History, Elphinstone College, in 1887. He was Director, Bombay Records, in 1888, Assistant Secretary, Government of India, and Director, Government of India Records, 1894–1900.

In bad health, Forrest returned to the United Kingdom in 1900. He went in 1904 to Iffley Turn House just outside Oxford, was knighted in 1913, and died there on 28 January 1926.

== Works ==
Forrest published books:

- Selections from the Official Writings of Mountstuart Elphinstone (1884)
- Selections from the State Papers in the Foreign Department (1890)
- The Administration of the Marquis of Lansdowne as Viceroy and Governor (1894)
- Sepoy Generals (1901)
- Cities of India Past and Present (1903)
- History of the Indian Mutiny (1904–1912, 3 vols.), a documentary history. John Laband wrote in 1976 of historiography of the Indian rebellion of 1857 in terms of "the voluminous literature of British historians such as Kaye, Holmes and G. W. Forrest." Rudrangshu Mukherjee, writing in 2008, stated that "Much of what we write and say today about 1857 is possible because of the work of [Surendra Nath Sen, Ramesh Chundra Majumdar and S B Chaudhuri] and of the great narratives produced in the second half of the 19th century and early 20th century by Charles Ball, John Kaye, G W Forrest and others."
- Selections from the Travels and Journals Preserved in the Bombay Secretariat (1906)
- Life of Field-Marshal Sir Neville Chamberlain, G.C.B., G.C.S.I. (1909), on Neville Bowles Chamberlain.
- Selections from the State Papers of the Governors-General of India: Warren Hastings (2 vols., 1910)
- Life of Lord Roberts (1914)
- The Life of Lord Clive (2 vols., 1918)
- Selections from the State Papers of the Governors-General of India: Lord Cornwallis (2 vols., 1926)

Other works were:

- The Famine in India (1897), pamphlet
- Articles on the deforestation of India in the Bombay Gazette.

== Family ==
In 1877 Forrest married Emma Georgina Viner, daughter of Thomas Viner of Crawley, Sussex. They had a son and a daughter.
