= George Forrest (VC) =

Recipient of the Victoria Cross

- Born: c. 1800; Dublin, Ireland
- Died: 3 November 1859 (aged 58–59); Dehra Dun, British India
- Children: George William Forrest
- Military career
- Allegiance: United Kingdom
- Branch: Bengal Army
- Rank: Captain
- Conflicts: Indian Mutiny
- Awards: Victoria Cross

George Forrest VC (c. 1800 – 3 November 1859) was born St Michael's, Dublin and was an Irish recipient of the Victoria Cross, the highest and most prestigious award for gallantry in the face of the enemy that can be awarded to British and Commonwealth forces.

== The Defence of the Magazine at Delhi ==
Forrest was about 57 years old, and a lieutenant in the Bengal Veteran Establishment, Bengal Army during the Indian Mutiny when the following deed took place on 11 May 1857 at Delhi, India for which he was awarded the VC.

Lieutenant Forrest was one of nine men who defended the Magazine for more than five hours against large numbers of rebels, until, on the wall being scaled and there being no hope of help, they fired the Magazine. Five of the defending band died in the explosion and one shortly afterwards, but many of the enemy were killed. See also John Buckley and William Raynor. His citation in the London Gazette reads:

For gallant conduct in the defence of the Delhi Magazine, on 11 May 1857.

Forrest later achieved the rank of captain and died at Dehra Dun, India, on 3 November 1859.
