= 150 Regiment RLC =

- Active: 1967-present
- Country: United Kingdom
- Branch: British Army
- Role: Logistics
- Size: Regiment; 456 personnel
- Part of: Royal Logistic Corps
- Website: 150 Regiment RLC

150 Regiment RLC is a reserve regiment of the Royal Logistic Corps of the British Army.

== History ==
The regiment was formed in the Royal Corps of Transport in 1967, as 150th (Northumbrian) Transport Regiment from seven territorial transport regiments, with four transport squadrons. The regiment was transferred into the Royal Logistic Corps and was renamed the 150th (Yorkshire) Regiment RLC in 1993. 216 Squadron was transferred to 159th Support Regiment in 2006 but transferred back under Army 2020 in 2014.

== Structure ==
The regiment's structure of five task squadrons, communications troop and band make it the largest unit in the Reserve RLC:

- Regimental Headquarters, at Londesborough Barracks, Hull
- 523 Headquarters Squadron, at Londesborough Barracks, Hull
- 216 Transport Squadron, in Tynemouth
- 217 Transport Squadron, in Leeds
- 218 Tanker Squadron, in Hull
- 219 Transport Squadron, in Doncaster
- 160 Transport Squadron in Lincoln
