= Royal Logistic Corps Museum =

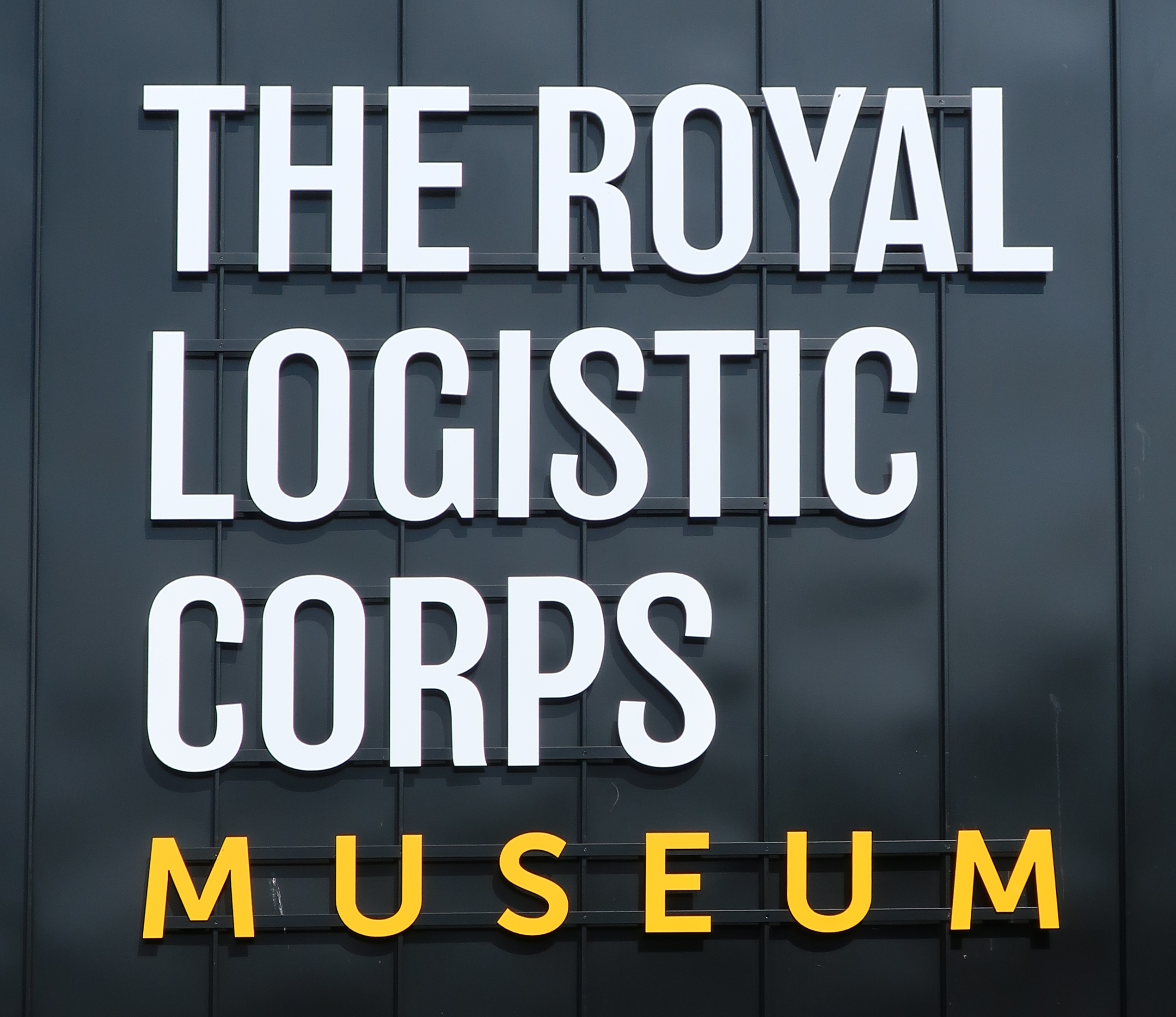
- Royal Logistic Corps Museum

- Location in Hampshire
- Established: 1995
- Location: Worthy Down Camp, near Winchester, Hampshire, England
- Coordinates: 51°06′40″N 1°19′03″W
- Type: Military museum
- Website: www.royallogisticcorps.co.uk/museum/

The Royal Logistic Corps Museum tells the story of logistic support to the British Army from Agincourt to the modern day. Based at Worthy Down near Winchester, the museum holds the collection of the Royal Logistic Corps and the collections of its forming corps, including the Royal Corps of Transport, the Royal Army Ordnance Corps, Royal Pioneer Corps, Army Catering Corps and the Postal and Courier Section of the Royal Engineers.

== History ==
The museum collection includes objects and archives from the Royal Logistic Corps (RLC) since its formation and the collections from the museums of the Royal Corps of Transport and of the Royal Army Ordnance Corps, along with objects and archives from the Royal Pioneer Corps and Army Catering Corps. The RLC Museum was established in Princess Royal Barracks, Deepcut in 1995, and moved to Worthy Down in 2021. It was officially opened by Anne, Princess Royal in May 2021.

== Collections ==
Exhibits include the Rolls-Royce that Field Marshal Viscount Montgomery was driven in when he landed in France shortly after the Normandy landings, Napoleon's field bakery captured at the Battle of Waterloo, and a large collection of horse-drawn and motorised military logistics vehicles, bomb disposal vehicles, equipment and weapons. There is an extensive medal collection, which features several Victoria Crosses.

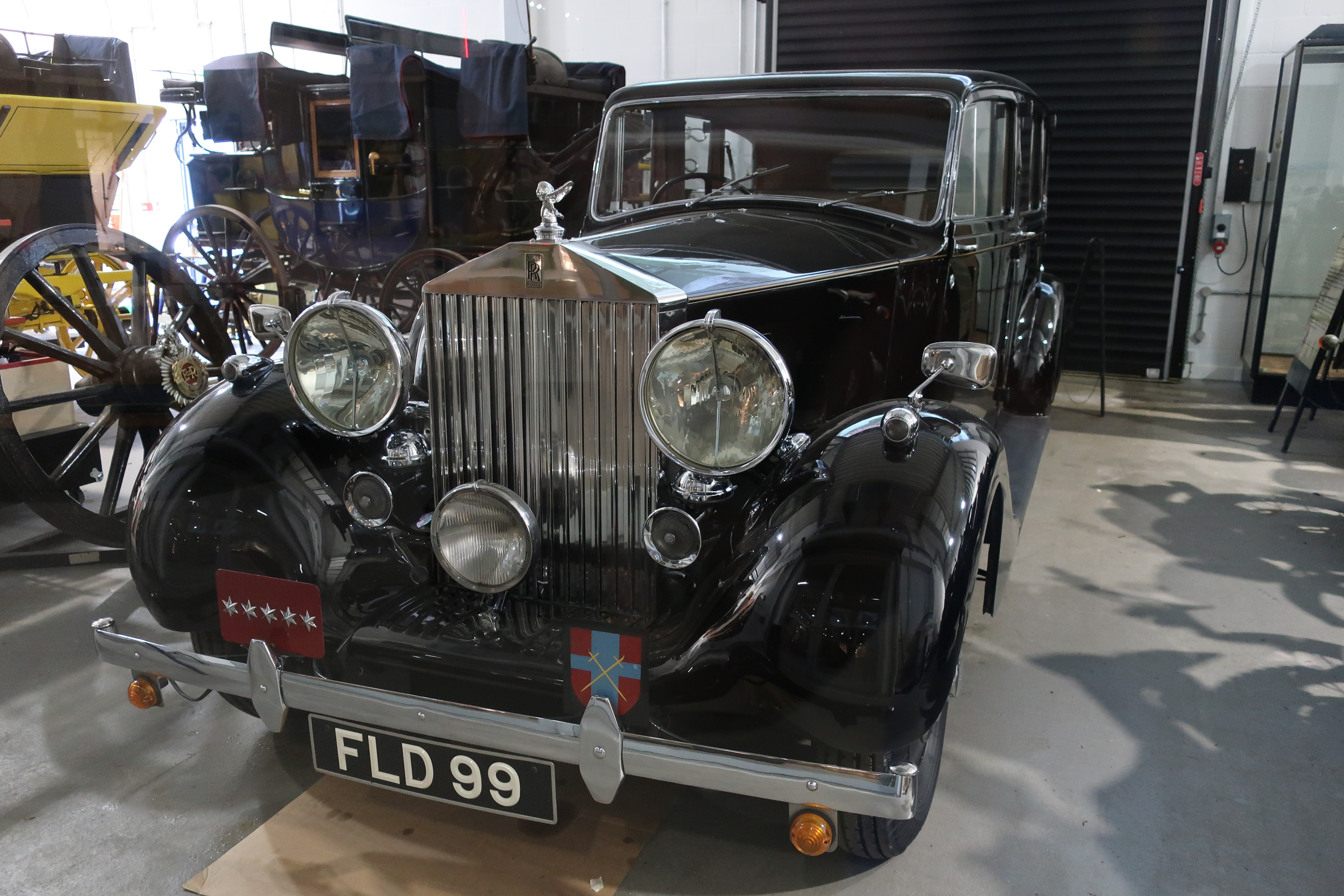
Montgomery's European staff car

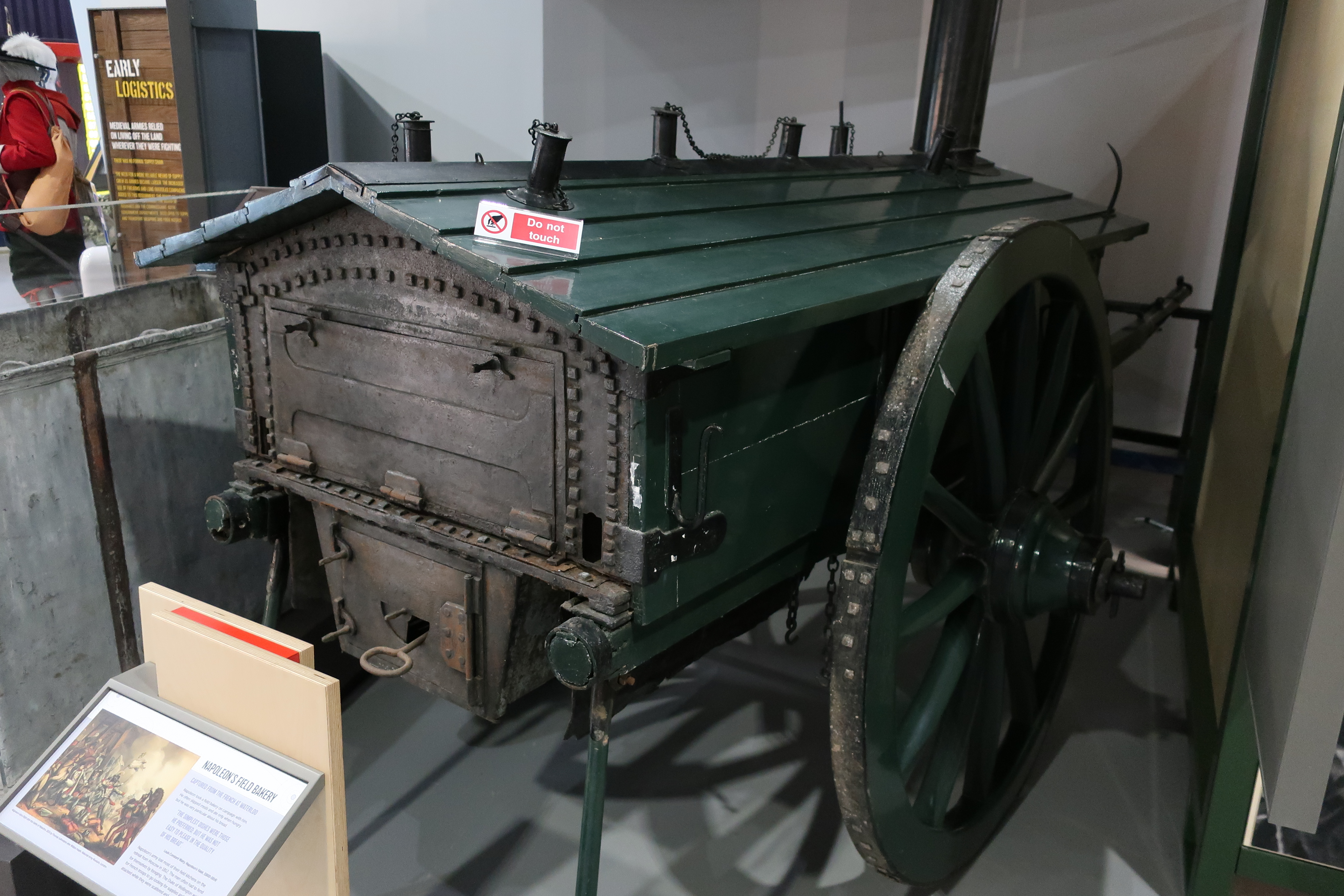
Napoleon's field bakery

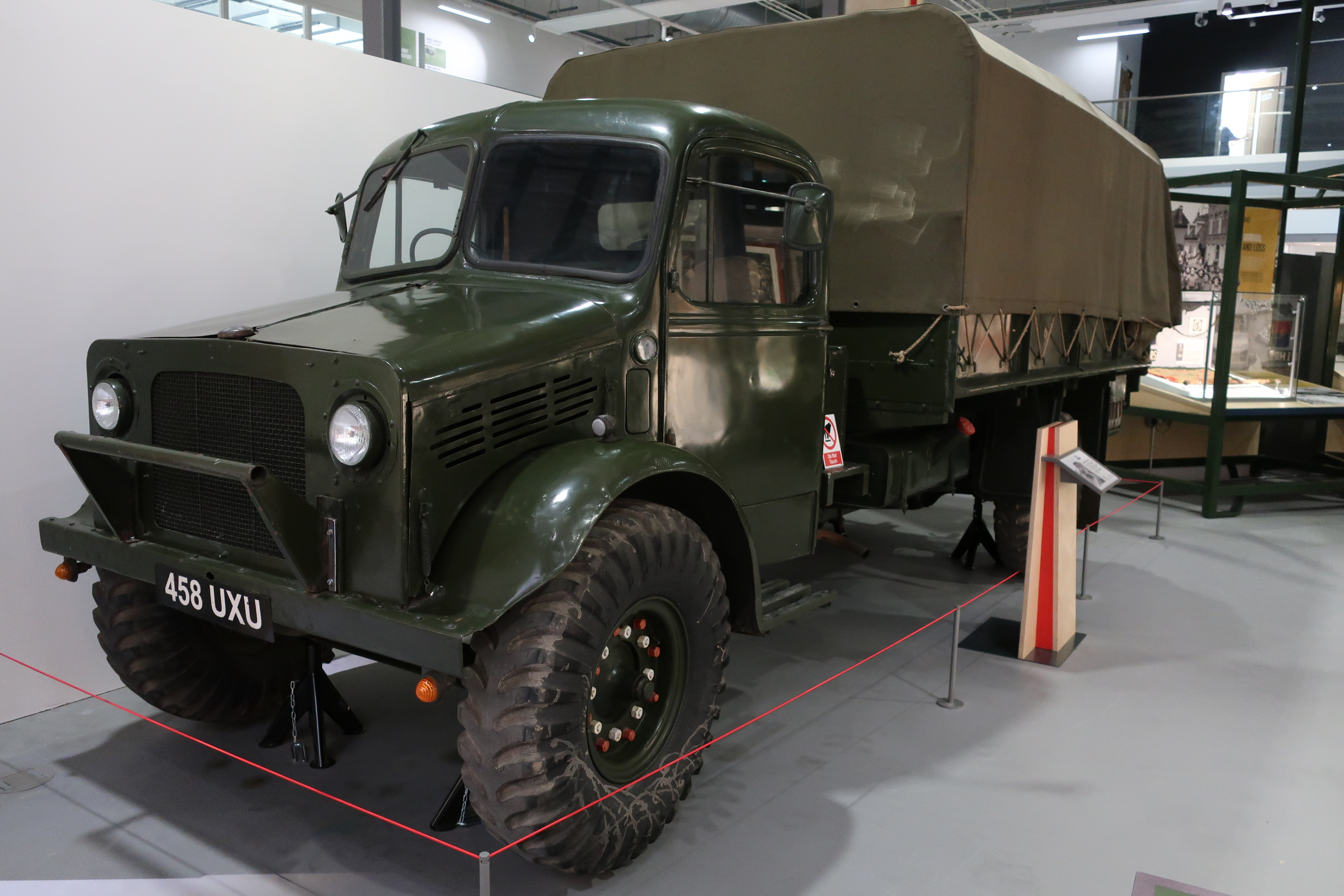
Bedford OY
