= Mindenhurst =

Neighbourhood in Deepcut in Surrey, England

Mindenhurst is a new neighbourhood in the village of Deepcut in Surrey, England, which is being built on the Princess Royal Barracks. It is in the London commuter belt giving families a rural lifestyle whilst being able to easily commute into the city. It will provide 1,200 new homes alongside 69 hectares (170 acres) of green space including woodlands. It will also have a number of amenities to support the new community.

== History ==
In March 2004 it was reported the MoD planned to close the Princess Royal Barracks, known widely as the Deepcut Barracks. In January 2008 the decision to sell the barracks was formally announced and in 2013 it was confirmed the barracks would close with the land being sold for housing development purposes. The MoD declared the site "surplus to Ministry of Defence requirements".

The local church (St Barbara's), which is being retained and refurbished as part of the new neighbourhood, was used as a filming location for the movie Kingsman: The Secret Service in 2013.

== Design ==
Skanska have applied a strict design code to the development to ensure it retains a premium village feel, in keeping with the areas rich history. This includes not having painted markings for parking areas, using only wood to construct play areas and even specifying door to window size ratios.

== Construction ==
Work to clear the site began on Monday the 8th of February 2016 with construction starting in summer 2016.

In July 2017 Skanska announced CALA Homes (Thames) Ltd was the successful bidder for the first land sale and they were set to build 215 new homes. This is now known as "Cala Phase 1", it is fully complete and all homes have been sold. In March 2018 it was announced that Cala had successfully bid for a second area of land and permission had been granted for a further 215 homes. As of January 2021 this is known as "Cala Phase 2" and it is approximately 50% built with over 75% of homes having been reserved.

In November 2019 it was announced that Trivelhus would build 21 homes, as of 2021 construction is yet to begin.

In June 2020 Bovis Homes, part of Vistry Group, secured planning permission for 127 homes and announced they would being construction in late summer 2020.

Decommissioning works at the barracks are expected to finish in 2021.

== Amenities ==
=== Primary School ===
Construction was completed in 2020 and it's currently awaiting handoff to Surrey County Council. The school includes two nursery classrooms, two reception classrooms and 12 more classrooms to accommodate years 1,2 and junior children located over the ground and first floors. There are also some break out spaces, small specialist group rooms a library and halls.

=== Village Green ===
Construction was completed in 2020, features include a duck pond, green open space and a large outdoor children's play area suitable for a wide age range.

=== Gastro Pub ===
Construction is due to begin in 2021, designed by MacKenzie Wheeler it features the traditional pub elements of bar, den, dining room, terrace and garden alongside a double-sided fireplace. There will also be an outdoor fireplace covered by a barn style roof to offer a year-round amenity.

=== Village shops ===
These are set to include a small supermarket, Skanska are currently trying to secure a provider.

=== Sports hub ===
Will include a dual use pitch for football and cricket, two junior football pitches, four tennis courts, outdoor gym equipment and a sports pavilion.

=== Play areas ===
There are a total of 12 play areas planned across the development, one is completed and is located on the village green.

=== Church ===
St Barbara's Church, Deepcut, was originally built in 1901 as a portable Garrison church. It is a Grade II listed building that has been carefully restored and refurbished as part of the Mindenhurst development. The church is now at the heart of the newly established Parish of Deepcut, which became an independent CofE parish in 2025. A modern church hall has also been completed and is now in regular use. The Vicar is Revd Canon Daniel Natnael, who lives with his family in the Mindenhurst community and leads the church's worship, outreach, and ministry.

== Location ==
Mindenhurst is located in Deepcut, Surrey, within the borough of Surrey Heath. The neighborhood is just 28 miles from the centre of London and is considered to be within the London metropolitan area also known as the "commuter belt".
There are many surrounding villages including Pirbright (3 miles), West End (3.5 miles) and Chobham (5 miles) as well towns including Frimley (2.3 miles), Camberley (4.5 miles), Woking (7.7 miles), Farnham (9 miles) and Guildford (9.5 miles).

== Transport ==
=== Cycling and walking ===
New paths will be created as part of the development.

=== Bus ===
Stagecoach South operates the number 11 service, an hourly bus service which passes through nearby Deepcut, serving the local areas in Surrey and Hampshire, such as Camberley, Frimley and Farnborough. The number 48 service, operated by White Bus Services, is a less frequent weekday service that connects the neighborhood to the wider area including nearby Frimley Park Hospital, Frimley Green, Brookwood railway station and Woking.

=== Train ===
Mindenhurst is served to nearby stations on the South West Main Line, with trains operated by South Western Railway. Brookwood has a regular service to London Waterloo - the fastest service takes 31 minutes. Woking has the fastest services, which takes 5 minutes. Farnborough (Main) also has a regular train service to London Waterloo, the fastest service taking 38 minutes. Farnborough North has regular train services operated by Great Western Railway to Guildford, the fastest service taking 17 minutes, and Reading, the fastest service taking 27 minutes.

=== Car ===
Mindenhurst is close to both the M3 and A3.
