= 158 Regiment RLC =

- Active: 1996-present
- Country: United Kingdom
- Branch: British Army
- Role: Logistics
- Size: Regiment; 435 personnel
- Part of: Royal Logistic Corps
- Website: 158 Regiment RLC

Commanders
- Honorary Colonel: Col Mark Underhill, OBE, DL

158 Regiment Royal Logistic Corps, is a reserve regiment of the British Army's Royal Logistic Corps. The Regiment's role is to provide logistical support to the Regular Army through its paired regular regiment, 7 Regiment RLC, as well as providing soldiers when required. 158 Regiment currently falls under the command 102 Logistics Brigade.

== History ==
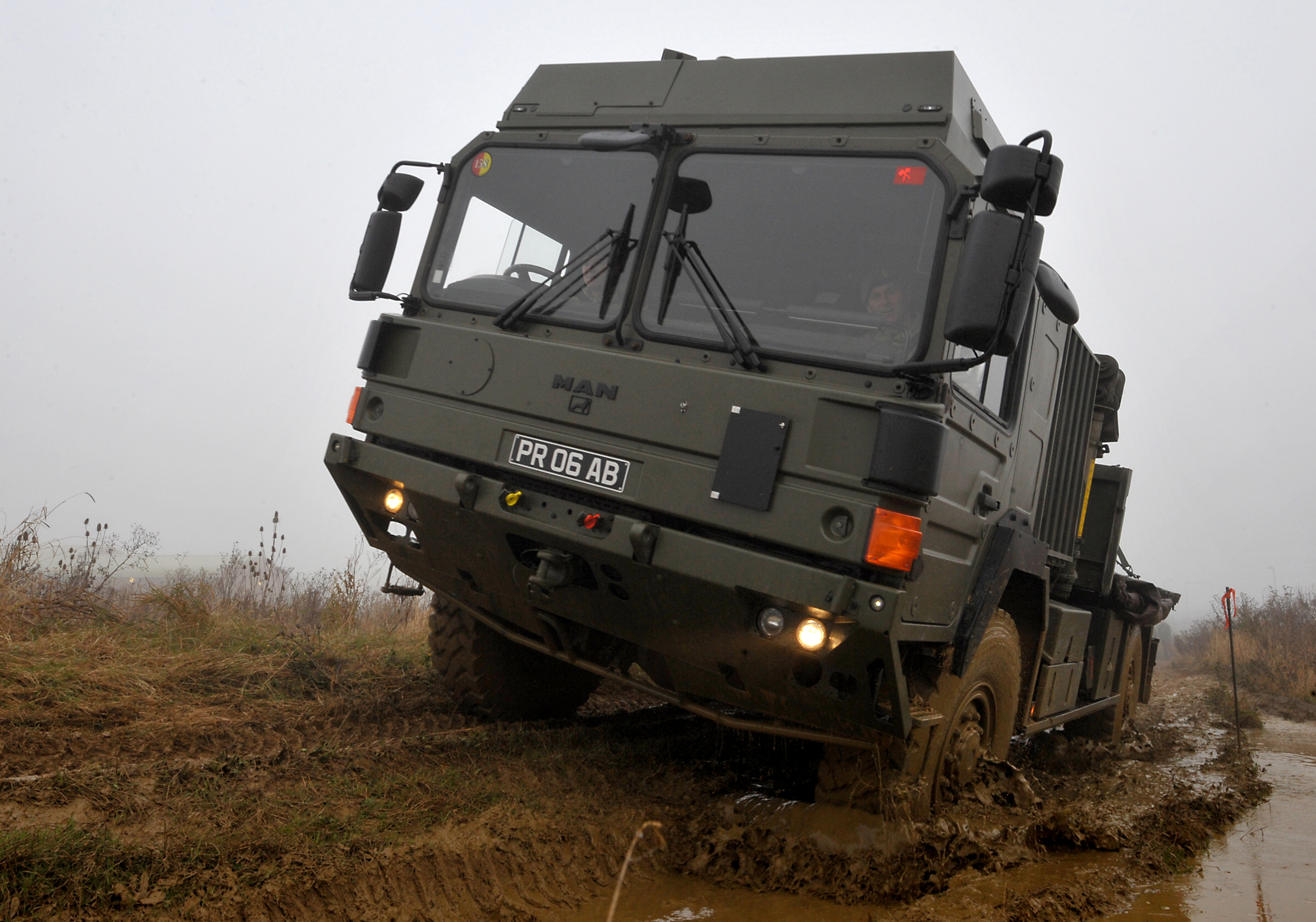
A MAN 6 Tonne vehicle of 158 Transport Regiment

The regiment was formed in 1996 by converting the 5th Battalion, the Royal Anglian Regiment from the infantry to transport role. 160 Squadron was formed in Lincoln in July 2014 as part of the Army 2020 restructuring.

== Structure ==
The current structure is as follows:

- 200 (Peterborough) HQ Squadron
- 201 (Bedford) Transport Squadron
- 202 (Ipswich) Transport & Fuel Squadron
  - M Troop, at Colchester Garrison
- 261 (Milton Keynes) Squadron (Changed from 678 AAC due to Future Soldier changes 01 April 2023)
- 294 (Grantham) Supplier Squadron

== Honorary Colonels ==
The following is a list of the Honorary Colonels of the Regiment:

- Lady Victoria Leatham DL (1996 to 5 April 2003)
- Vacant (5 April 2003 to 1 November 2003)
- Lieutenant General Sir Nick Houghton (1 November 2003 to 1 September 2008)
- Major General David John Shouesmith (1 September 2008 to 2013)
- Colonel Mark Underhill OBE late RLC (1 November 2013 to present)
