= Movement controller =

A movement controller is responsible for assisting in planning, preparation, documentation, coordination and control of military movements in support of operations, exercises and administrative deployments worldwide by road, rail, sea and air.

They have good working knowledge of all forms of transport, both military and civilian.

Works in conjunction with elements of all services, other government departments, civilian and commercial officials.

Employed worldwide, static or mobile, as a team member or individual.
