= Ramped cargo lighter =

Canadian cargo landing craft

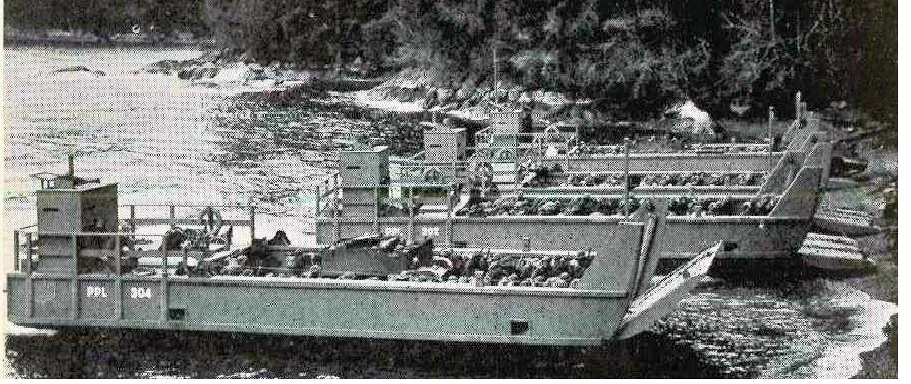
- Four ramped cargo lighters, built in Canada, touch down and discharge their cargoes

Class overview
- Name: Ramped cargo lighter
- Builders: Dominion Construction Co. Ltd., Vancouver, British Columbia; Howard Furnace & Foundries Ltd., Toronto, Ontario
- Operators: Royal Canadian Navy; Royal Navy; British Army; Yugoslav Partisans
- Preceded by: various landing craft and lighters
- Succeeded by: Ramped powered lighter
- Built: 1943–1944
- Completed: ~800+
- Active: 0

General characteristics
- Type: Landing craft; lighter
- Displacement: 26 long tons (26,417 kg)
- Length: 52 ft (16 m)
- Beam: 18 ft (5.5 m)
- Draught: 2.75 ft (0.84 m) loaded
- Ramps: 1
- Propulsion: 2 × 100 bhp Gray Marine 6 cylinder, 330 cubic inch petrol engines
- Speed: 10 kt
- Capacity: 1x medium tank, or 80 troops, or 35 long tons (35,562 kg) cargo
- Crew: Four: coxswain, stoker, stoker’s mate, and seaman

The ramped cargo lighter or RCL was a landing craft used in many parts of the world during the Second World War. Designed in Canada and manufactured in Vancouver and Toronto, its primary purpose was lighterage work following assault landings. The RCL also provided water transport in coastal operations. These lighters were built in sections to simplify shipping and assembled in the theatre of operations.

Manufactured of plywood over a wood frame, this shallow-draft, barge-like boat with a crew of four, could ferry 80 troops, ordnance, vehicles, or a tank, to shore at 9–10 knots. With such a range of work and use in such varied circumstances, standard procedures for loading varied too; loads could be lowered into RCLs from ships’ davits or derricks, or, if from land, simply driven or carried over the bow ramp. Cargoes or troops generally left the lighter over the bow ramp.

== Origins ==
In early 1942, the Royal Navy found itself in need of much greater landing capacity in order to provide lift for the, at the time, Allied 1942 and 1943 invasion plans Round Up and Sledgehammer. Requirements in south-east Asia called for a suitable craft for supply duties on inland waterways such as the Chindwin. The landing craft construction programme in Britain was incapable of providing sufficient craft so quickly, and US production had not yet come into full swing. Among the possibilities, Canadian resources were investigated, and a design was developed under the supervision of Royal Canadian Navy construction engineers and representatives of the British Ministry of War Transport. The RCL was built of plywood to save time and critical metals, and frame, skin, and powerplant were all readily available in Canada.

These lighters were not intended for the initial assault, but for the following build-up: ferrying vehicles and stores from ship to shore, around harbours, or in littoral or riverine environments.

== Design ==
The overall dimensions of the RCL were 52 feet (16 m) bow to stern, and 18 feet (5.5 m) beam. The cargo well (or tank deck) was 35 feet (11 m) long. The bow ramp was lowered and raised by two hand winches. The ramp was built of plywood faced with steel and hinged to steel receiving plates on the bow. The framework of the RCL was constructed of appropriate Canadian timbers and covered with a seven-ply marine plywood, Sylvaply weather-board. The craft weighed 25 tons, and had a carrying capacity of 35 tons It was designed to carry ordnance and troops, as well as do general lighterage work where dock facilities were not available. They were capable of carrying tanks, troops, and loaded trucks ashore in very shallow water. Watertight compartments in the hull construction enabled these boats to take a great deal of punishment without losing buoyancy.

The two Gray Marine 6-cylinder, 330 cubic inch, petrol engines each generated 100 brake horsepower (75 kW). Each engine served a 24-inch (610 mm) propeller. The engines were arranged port and starboard, aft of the cargo well. This power plant propelled the RCL at 9–10 knots (17–19 km/h; 10–12 mph) maximum speed. Steering was by means of a port and a starboard rudder. Some sources refer to RCLs having Chrysler engines and others that the RCL had diesel engines.

The RCL was manufactured in major subsections which could more easily be shipped and completed at the scene of operations. In Great Britain, many of the RCL prefabricated components were assembled by Wates Ltd. The beam of these lighters made them unsuitable for lowering from Royal Navy or Merchant Navy landing ships infantry davits, but they could be carried on the decks of these ships and others with sufficient deck space. The maintenance and repair ships of the Royal Navy's Beachy Head class (commissioned from late 1944–1946) could carry two RCLs.

The two Canadian firms building RCL were Dominion Construction Co. Ltd., Vancouver, British Columbia, a general contractor and consulting engineering firm, and Howard Furnace & Foundries Ltd., Toronto, a firm which in peacetime manufactured air-conditioning equipment, warm-air furnaces, duct and fittings, coal stokers, and oil burners. Dominion Construction built a special 300-by-180-foot (91 m × 55 m) fabrication and assembly plant where 453 RCLs were built (averaging two per day) by late 1944. Howard Furnace (Plywoods Fabricator Division) built 345 by late 1944.

By the end of February 1944, Canadian shipyards had produced 925 landing craft; the ramped cargo lighter, 72-foot (22 m) assault barge, and a 51-foot (16 m) landing vessel.

== Service history ==
During the last two years of the war, RCLs were operated by the Royal Navy and Royal Canadian Navy, by some Royal Engineer inland water transport companies, and by Yugoslavian partisans.

=== Italy and the Adriatic ===
Ramped cargo lighters were used by the commando raiding unit, "Popski's Private Army" (PPA). The crews, Royal Engineers, sailed the PPA into Venice and transported them around the marshes, canals, and flooded areas in Northern Italy. Several operations were mounted to sail up the Adriatic and get behind German lines.

RCLs were also part of the British Army and Royal Navy craft, based in Vis harbour and Komiza harbour, used to support Yugoslav partisans in 1944–1945. Eventually, the partisans received 12 from the British (between May and December 1944). Designated as motorna splav (MS) or motor rafts, they were based in Vis harbour and Komiza harbour, beginning in December 1944. Experience with MSs was, according to Yugoslav sources, very good, mostly because the ramp allowed quick loading/unloading of troops and material. Motor sailing boats that were used for the same purpose needed much more time for loading/unloading.

=== Far East ===
HMS Beachy Head, and the other nine maintenance escort vessels built in Canada for the Royal Navy each carried two RCLs. All these depot and repair ships were intended for service in Southeast Asia and the Far East providing machine repairs and equipment in remote areas not supported by Allied naval bases. RCLs from these ships, and others in the SEAC area, also performed lighterage duties in Rangoon and Singapore. Logistical support for the British operations in Burma in the winter of 1944–1945 relied greatly on inland waterways because road construction and improvement were prohibitively expensive in materials and personnel above Kalewa. The difficulties of road communications in Burma included dusty or muddy unimproved roads, jungle, obstacles, and unserviceable abandoned vehicles. At Kalewa, on the Chindwin river, impromptu boat yards were set up. Ramped cargo lighters were among the craft assembled and launched there by Indian Engineers. A tractor crane was used to position the stern, centre, and bow sections of RCLs for joining. RCLs were among the simplest craft to assemble, requiring no riveting and being composed of relatively light subsections. As soon as a vessel was launched more prefabricated sections were placed onto the slipway for assembly. Following the assembly of the major subsections, deck work and finishing were accomplished. The engineers then put the RCLs through speed trials on the river. Once deployed in ferry work the RCLs could encounter river depths shallower than 3 feet. RCL crewmen would need to pilot the helmsman through shallows. The crew needed to check depth often with a pole.

Ramped cargo lighters were employed, in January 1945, in the landings on Akyab Island, off the Arakan coast of Burma, by Commandos and other troops of XV Indian Corps. RCLs landed troops, vehicles, and stores following the initial assault landings.

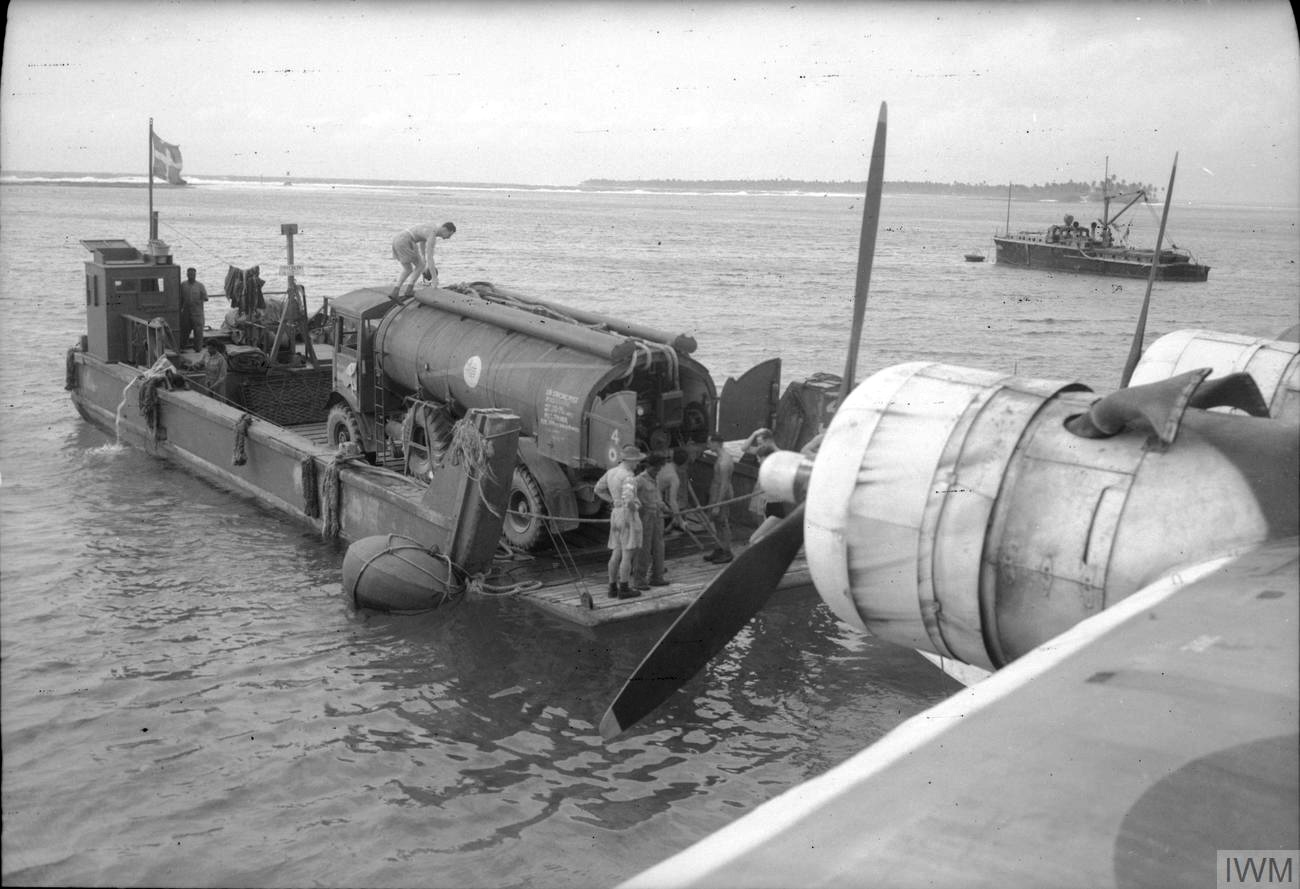
A ramped cargo lighter brings an AEC Matador bowser to a Sunderland flying boat, moored off Direction Island, Cocos Islands.

The RAF seaplane and flying boat anchorage at Direction Island, Cocos Islands, employed RCLs in refuelling; an AEC Matador petrol bowser was embarked on board and floated out to waiting planes.

== Post-war ==
Not being assault craft, most of the RCLs will have survived the war in serviceable condition. Many RCLs used in the Far East were not sent back to the United Kingdom. Damaged RCLs, along with other damaged landing craft, were sunk rather than repaired. In Cochin, India, at the shore establishment HMS Chinkara (home of the Landing Craft Storage, Section 21), many such craft were towed out to the 10 fathom mark and sunk by various means from axe to 40mm Bofors gun fire. This left an RCL surfeit that was sold off for civilian uses. The RCL was used post-war by island ferry services in Australia and Canada.

== See also ==
- LCP (L)
- LCM (1)
- LCM (2)
- LCVP (United States)
- Landing craft mechanized
- Landing ship, infantry
