= Army Catering Corps =

Corps of the British Army responsible for the feeding of all army units

- Badge of the Army Catering Corps
- Active: 1941–1993
- Country: United Kingdom
- Branch: British Army
- Role: Catering for troops
- Garrison/HQ: Aldershot Garrison
- Motto: We Sustain
- March: Sugar and Spice

The Army Catering Corps (ACC) was a corps of the British Army responsible for the feeding of all Army units. It was formed in 1941 and amalgamated into the Royal Logistic Corps in 1993.

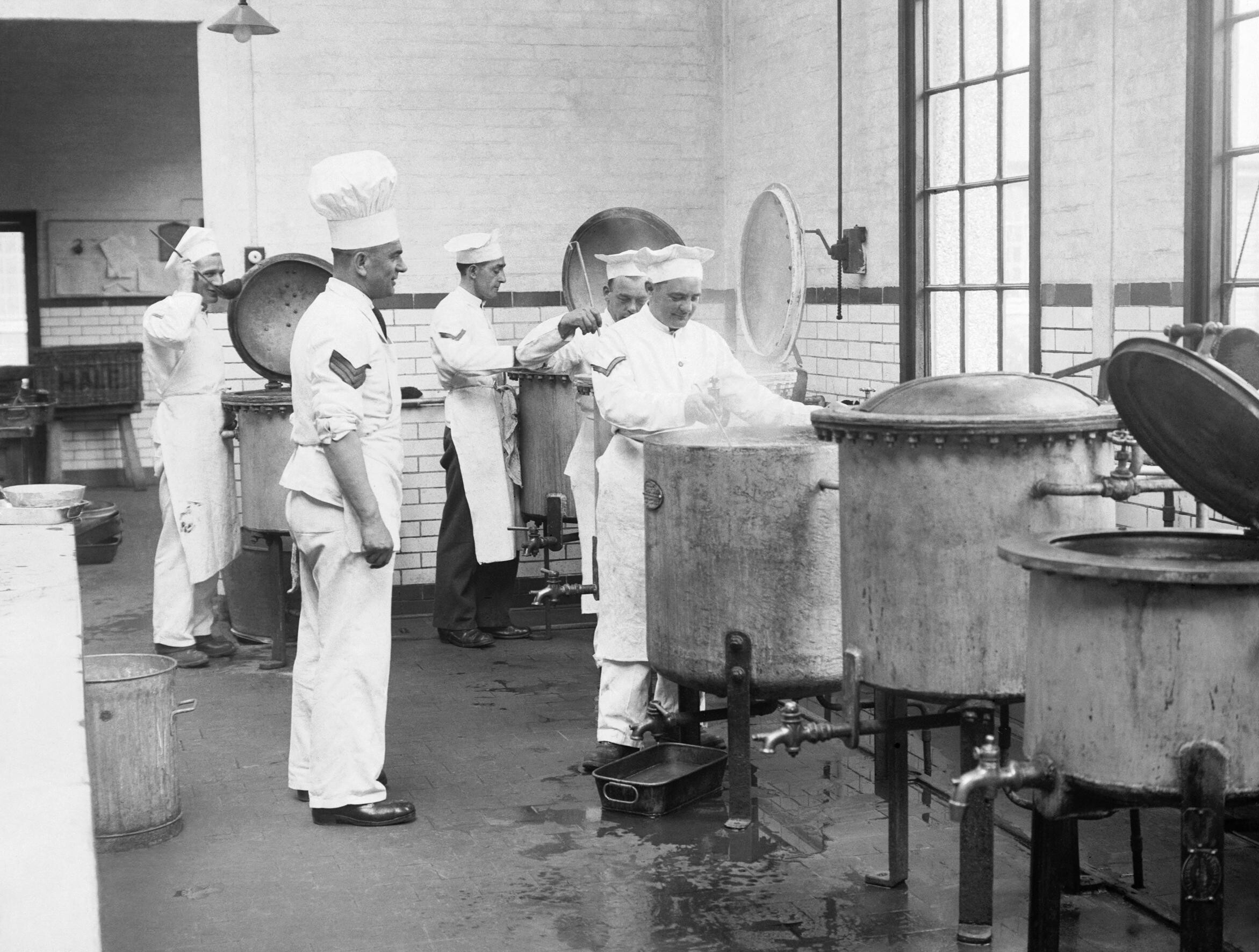
Army cooks preparing stew in the kitchens at Aldershot Barracks, November 1939

== History ==
In 1938 Leslie Hore-Belisha, the Secretary of State for War, appointed Sir Isidore Salmon as Honorary Catering Adviser for the Army. Salmon produced a report recommending various reforms including the appointment of Richard Byford (a former catering manager at Trust House Hotels) as Chief Inspector of Army Catering and the creation of a school of catering at St. Omer Barracks in Aldershot in 1938. His report also led to the formation of the Army Catering Corps as part of the Royal Army Service Corps in March 1941.

The Army Catering Corps then became an independent corps in 1965. It was awarded the Freedom of Aldershot in 1971 and the Freedom of Rushmoor in 1981.

Two members of the Army Catering Corps were killed while off duty in the Droppin Well bombing in 1982.

On 5 April 1993, following the Options for Change review, the Army Catering Corps united with the Royal Corps of Transport, the Royal Army Ordnance Corps, the Royal Pioneer Corps, and the Postal and Courier Service of the Royal Engineers, to form the Royal Logistic Corps.

== Alliances ==
- Australia – Australian Army Catering Corps

== See also ==
- Category:Army Catering Corps officers
- Category:Army Catering Corps soldiers
