= 159 Regiment RLC =

- Active: 1 April 2007-present
- Country: United Kingdom
- Branch: British Army
- Role: Logistics
- Size: Regiment; 484 personnel
- Part of: Royal Logistic Corps
- Website: 159 Regiment RLC

Insignia
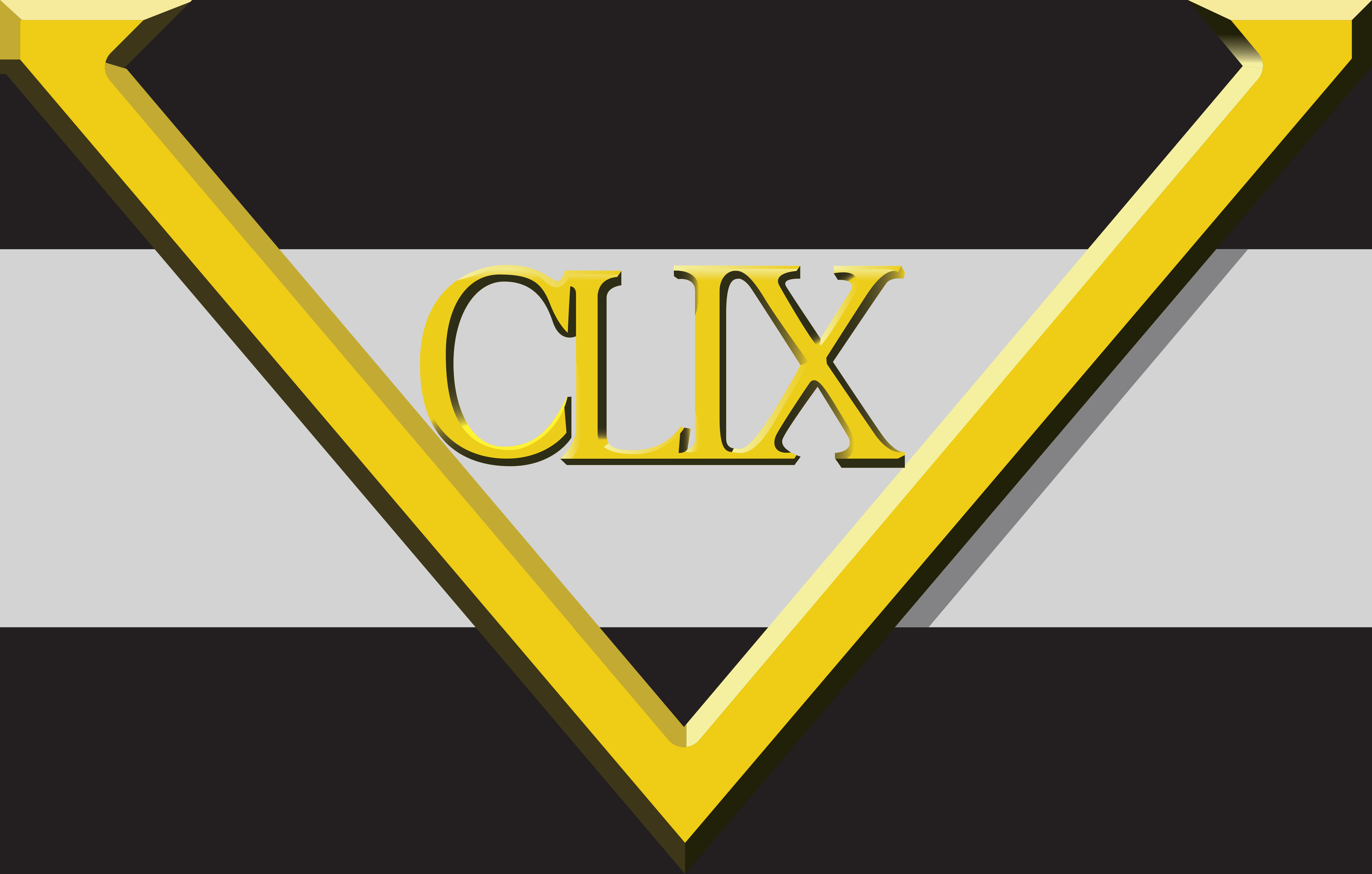
- Identification symbol

159 Regiment RLC is a reserve regiment of the British Army's Royal Logistic Corps. It forms part of 102 Logistic Brigade.

== History ==
The regiment was formed on 1 April 2007 as a product of Future Army Structures (FAS) with the aim of providing the contingent component to 6 Supply Regiment.

The regiment was made-up of one sub-unit from the Scottish Transport Regiment (125 Squadron), one squadron from 150 Regiment RLC (216 Squadron) and two squadrons from the Welsh Transport Regiment (123 Squadron and 237 Squadron).

123 Supply Squadron is located nearby to the large MOD Donnington depot, which holds and issues a large range of Army stores.

In the summer of 2014, under the Army 2020 re-organisation, the regiment was restructured. 216 Squadron in Tynemouth re-subordinated back to 150 Regiment RLC and 381 Squadron in Lancaster re-subordinated into 156 Regiment RLC. 125 Squadron closed its base in Glasgow but re-formed in Stoke-on-Trent in late 2014. The regiment also received 294 Squadron, based in Grantham.

== Structure ==
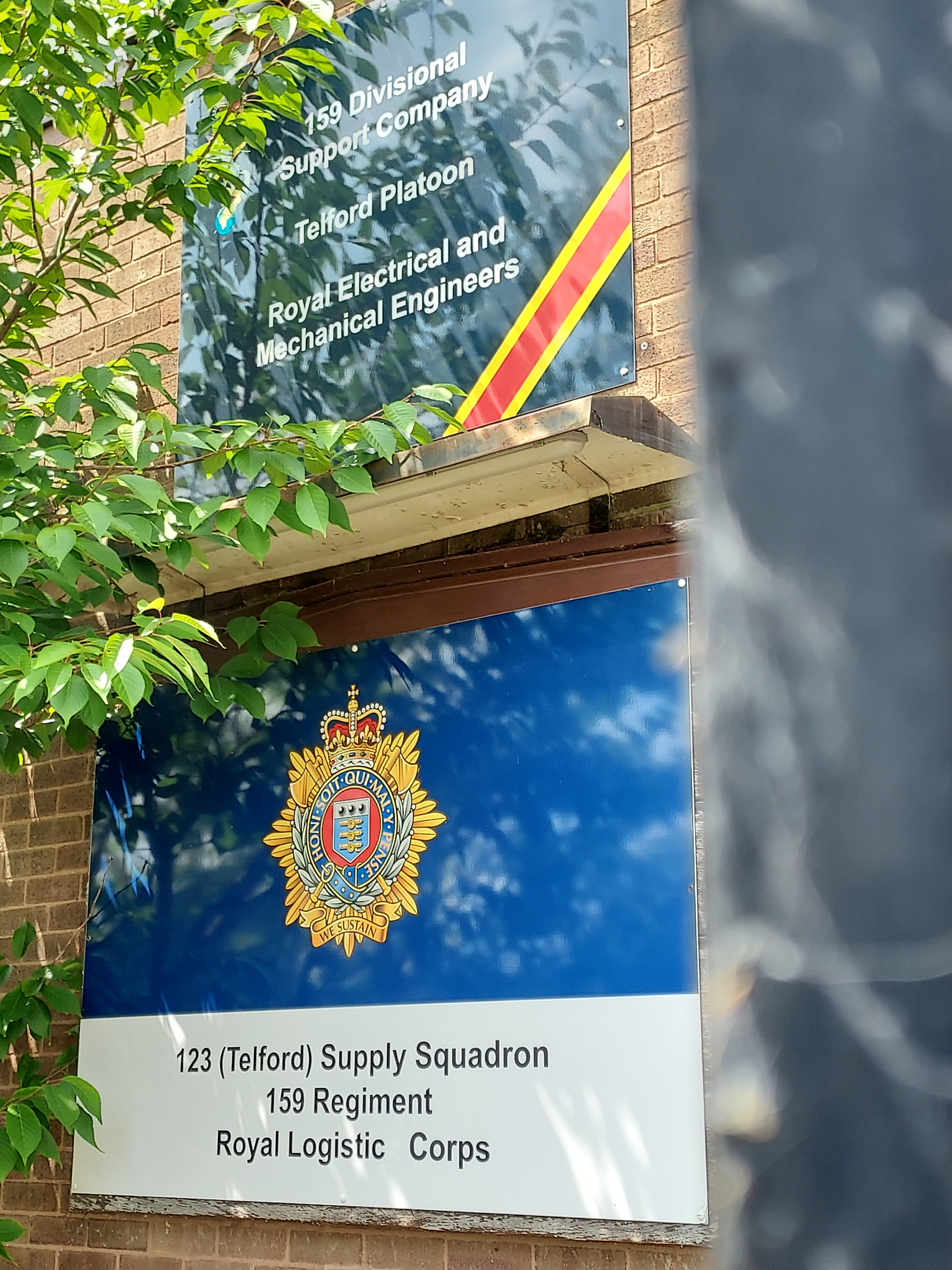
Unit sign at 123 Supply Squadron Army Reserve Centre, Telford, with co-located REME Army Reserve company.

The current structure is as follows:

- 243 (Coventry) Headquarters Squadron.
- 123 (Telford) Supply Squadron.
- 125 (Stoke) Supply Squadron.
- 237 (West Bromwich) Supply Squadron.
- 203 (Loughborough) Transport Squadron.
