= MOD Worthy Down =

Military base in Hampshire, England

- South Wonston, Hampshire in England
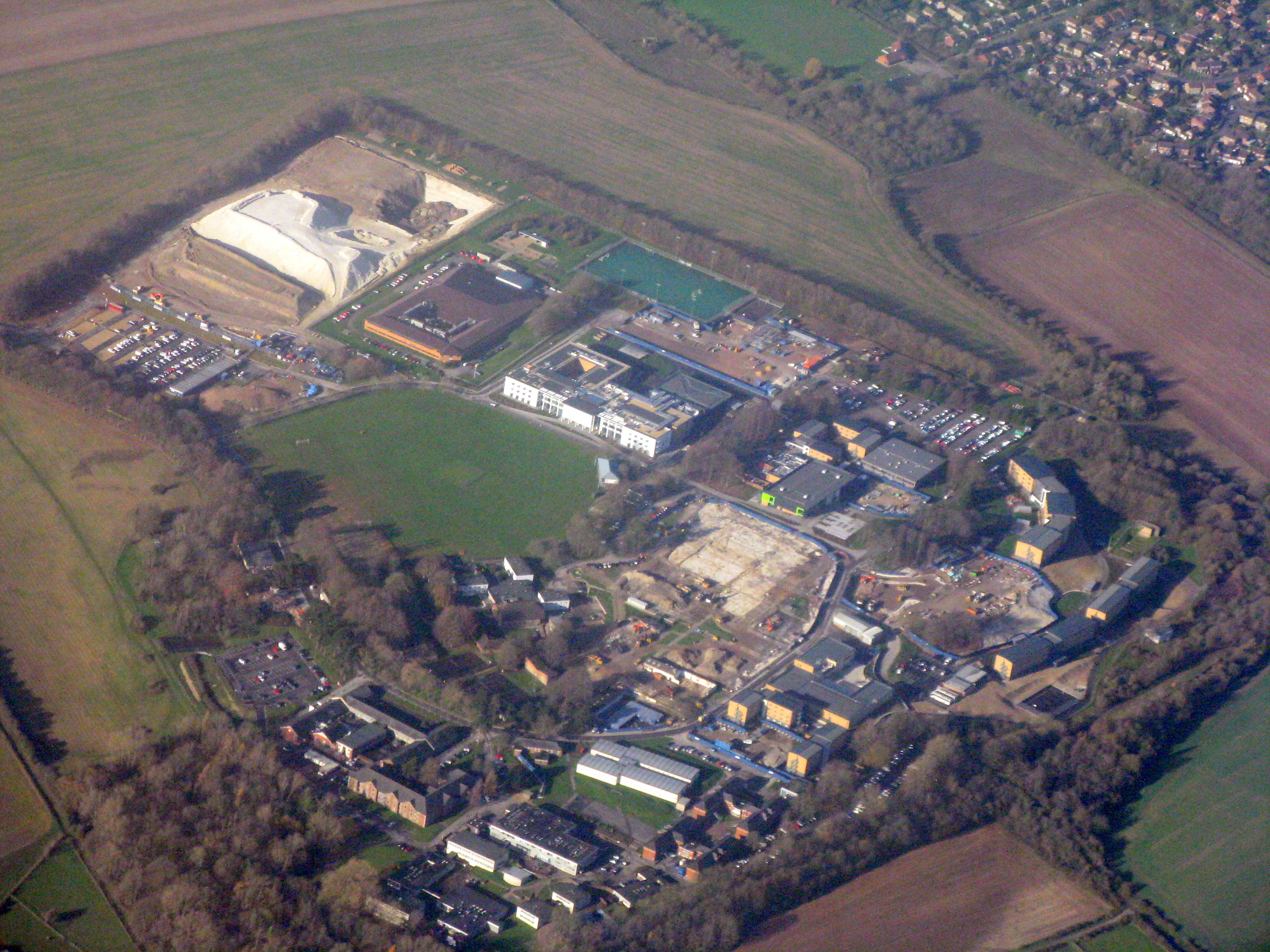
- The site in 2017, during its extensive rebuild

Site information
- Type: Military establishment
- Owner: Ministry of Defence
- Operator: British Army

Location
- Location within Hampshire MOD Worthy Down (the United Kingdom)
- Coordinates: 51°06′37″N 01°19′08″W

Site history
- Built: 1960
- In use: 1960–present

Garrison information
- Occupants: HQ Defence School of Logistics and Administration (DSLA); RHQ Adjutant General's Corps; RHQ Royal Logistic Corps

MOD Worthy Down is a tri-service establishment in Winchester, Hampshire, England. It forms part of the wider Winchester Garrison and houses the headquarters of the Defence School of Logistics and Administration (DSLA), as well as the headquarters of the Royal Logistic Corps and Adjutant General's Corps. DSLA provides logistic support, personnel administration and leadership training to all three armed services. The site is north of Winchester, between the villages of South Wonston and Kings Worthy. The Royal Logistic Corps Museum is also located here.

== History ==
An airfield was established here in 1918 for the Royal Flying Corps, and became RAF Worthy Down. In 1939 the airfield was transferred to the Royal Navy and used by the Fleet Air Arm until 1950, then as an engineering training school.

The site was handed over to the Royal Army Pay Corps in 1960 and became home to the Electronic Accounting Development Unit, which housed its computer centre with its IBM 705 system there. The computer was used to process the 1961 UK census, which was the first to be processed electronically.

With the merger of the Royal Army Pay Corps into the Adjutant General's Corps in 1992, the site became the headquarters of the Adjutant General's Corps and a training depot for members of the Staff and Personnel Support, Education and Training Services and Army Legal Service branches.

The Defence Food Services School was built on the site in 2009.

In 2012 the RAF School of Administration moved to Worthy Down from Southwick Park, near Portsmouth.

On 9 June 2014 the Ministry of Defence announced that a new £250 million Defence College of Logistics, Policing and Administration was to be built at Worthy Down, with training facilities and living accommodation for up to 2,000 students and staff. The facility, which brought the training for key support roles for the Royal Navy, Army and Royal Air Force onto a single site for the first time, was completed in 2018.
