= Royal Logistic Corps =

Logistic arm of the British Army

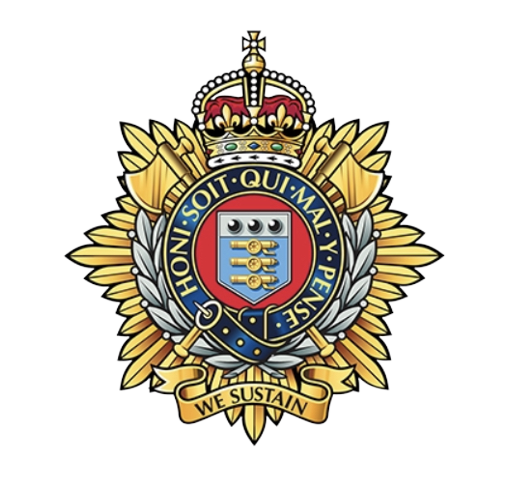
- Insignia and cap badge of the Royal Logistic Corps
- Active: 5 April 1993 – present
- Country: United Kingdom
- Branch: British Army
- Role: Military logistics
- Garrison/HQ: Worthy Down Camp, Winchester
- Motto: "We Sustain"
- March: On Parade; Lion, Sword and Crown

Commanders
- Colonel-in-Chief: Anne, Princess Royal
- Corps Colonel: Colonel Jacqueline Powell ADC
- Master General of Logistics: Major General Jo Chestnutt CBE
- Command Sergeant Major: Warrant Officer Class 1 (Corps SM) Wayne E Marquis

Insignia
- Tactical recognition flash

The Royal Logistic Corps provides logistic support functions to the British Army. It is the largest Corps in the Army.

== History ==
The Royal Logistic Corps (RLC) was formed on 5 April 1993, by the union of five British Army corps:

- Royal Engineers Postal and Courier Service
- Royal Corps of Transport
- Royal Army Ordnance Corps
- Royal Pioneer Corps
- Army Catering Corps

The RLC comprises both Regular and Army Reserve units.

The RLC is the only combat service support corps of the British Army with battle honours, derived from the usage of previous transport elements of the Royal Waggon Train, and their successors as cavalry. The battle honours are:

- Peninsula
- Battle of Waterloo
- Lucknow
- Taku Forts
- Peking

== Cap badge ==
The RLC cap badge is an amalgamation of the cap badges of the forming corps:

- The shield in the centre is from the Royal Army Ordnance Corps
- The laurel and garter band is from the Royal Engineers
- The crossed axes are from the Royal Pioneer Corps
- The Brunswick star is from the Royal Corps of Transport
- The motto, "We Sustain", is from the Army Catering Corps

The inscription on the garter band "Honi soit qui mal y pense" can be translated as "Shame on anyone who thinks evil of it". It is the motto of the Order of the Garter.

== Headquarters ==
The Corps Headquarters is at Worthy Down Camp near Winchester. It is headed by a Colonel (Colonel RLC) as the professional head of the Corps. Col RLC is responsible for the Moral Component, regimental infrastructure and support and works to Commander Home Command. Col RLC remains responsible for the Corps of Drums, which often parades with the RLC Band. (AG).

The RLC Band was formed in 1993. It provides musical support while also representing the Royal Logistic Corps, and on occasion, the wider British Army. They are able to produce no more than 12 working ensembles at a time. These include a marching band, big band, fanfare team, and acoustic groups.

=== Museum ===
The Royal Logistic Corps Museum was based at Princess Royal Barracks, Deepcut near Camberley in Surrey, but was closed prior to a move to Worthy Down near Winchester, where it re-opened in May 2021.

== List of units ==
=== Regiments ===
Regular regiments
- 1 Regiment RLC
- 4 Regiment RLC
- 6 Regiment RLC
- 7 Regiment RLC
- 9 Regiment RLC
- 10 Queen's Own Gurkha Logistic Regiment RLC
- 11 Explosive Ordnance Disposal and Search Regiment RLC
- 13 Air Assault Support Regiment RLC
- 17 Port and Maritime Regiment RLC
- 25 Training Regiment RLC
- 27 Regiment RLC
- 29 Regiment RLC
- Gurkha ARRC Support Battalion – (QOGLR personnel)

Reserve regiments
- 150 (Yorkshire) Regiment RLC
- 151 (Greater London) Regiment RLC
- 152 (North Irish) Regiment RLC
- 154 (Scottish) Regiment RLC
- 156 (North West) Regiment RLC
- 157 (Welsh) Regiment RLC
- 158 (Royal Anglian) Regiment RLC
- 159 Regiment RLC
- 162 Regiment RLC
- 165 Port and Maritime Regiment RLC
- 167 Catering Support Regiment RLC

=== Specialist sub-units ===
- Commando Logistic Support Squadron RLC – part of the Commando Logistic Regiment
  - 383 Commando Petroleum Troop RLC
- 20 Transport Squadron RLC – part of London District
- 44 Support Squadron RLC – part of Royal Military Academy Sandhurst
- 96 (Duke of Gloucester) Squadron RLC - part of 1st Army Training Regiment Pirbright
- 105 Logistic Support Squadron – part of British Army Training Unit Suffield
- 108 (The Princess Royal) Squadron RLC - part of 2nd Army Training Regiment Pirbright
- 132 Aviation Support Squadron RLC – part of 7 Aviation Close Support Battalion REME
- 821 EOD & Search Squadron RLC – part of 33 Engineer Regiment (EOD)
- Joint Helicopter Support Squadron – part of Joint Aviation Command
- 2 Operational Support Group

== Master General of Logistics ==
There is also a ceremonial head (instituted in 2009), who heads the Corps and its wider family such as the Associations and Cadets, known as the Master General of Logistics (MGL). Holders of the post include:

- General Sir Kevin O'Donoghue (2009–2012)
- Lieutenant General Sir Mark Poffley (2012–2021)
- Major General Simon T. Hutchings (2021–2024)
- Major General Jonathan E. A. Chestnutt (2024–present)

== Publications ==
The Sustainer is the magazine of the RLC Association. The Waggoner remains the Journal of the RASC/RCT Association. The RAOC Gazette that of the RAOC Association and The Pioneer of the RPC Association. The Review is an annual magazine of essays published by the Corps.

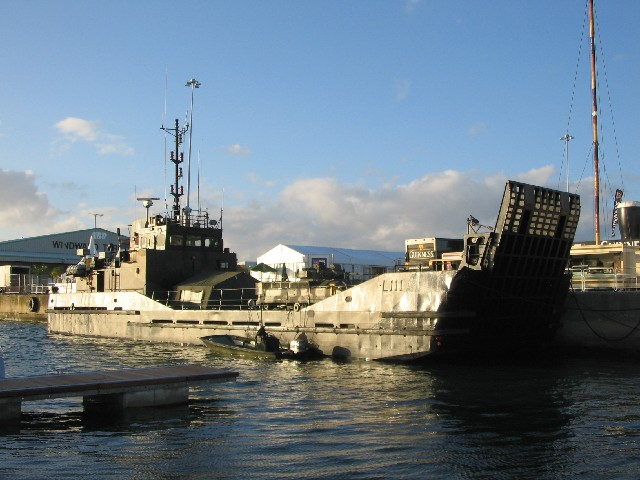
Royal Logistic Corps landing craft, the RCL Arezzo

== Victoria Cross ==
The RLC has five Victoria Cross holders. All five derive historically from establishments that eventually became the Royal Corps of Transport.

- Private Samuel Morley. Military Train. 15 April 1858.
- Private (Farrier) Michael Murphy. Military Train. 15 April 1858 (later forfeited).
- Assistant Commissary James Langley Dalton. Commissariat & Transport Department. 22 January 1879.
- Second Lieutenant Alfred Cecil Herring. Army Service Corps. 23 March 1918.
- Private Richard George Masters. Army Service Corps. 9 April 1918.

== Order of precedence ==
Preceded by Royal Army Chaplains' Department	Order of Precedence	Succeeded by Royal Army Medical Service

== See also ==
- Royal Logistic Corps Museum
- Royal Army Service Corps
- Options for Change
- Loss of Strength Gradient
- British logistics in the Boer War
- British logistics in the Falklands War
- Hong Kong Logistic Support Regiment RLC
- List of roles in the British Army

== Sources ==
- Heyman, Charles (2012). The British Army: A Pocket Guide, 2012–2013. Pen & Sword. ISBN 9781848841079.
