= Ramped craft logistic =

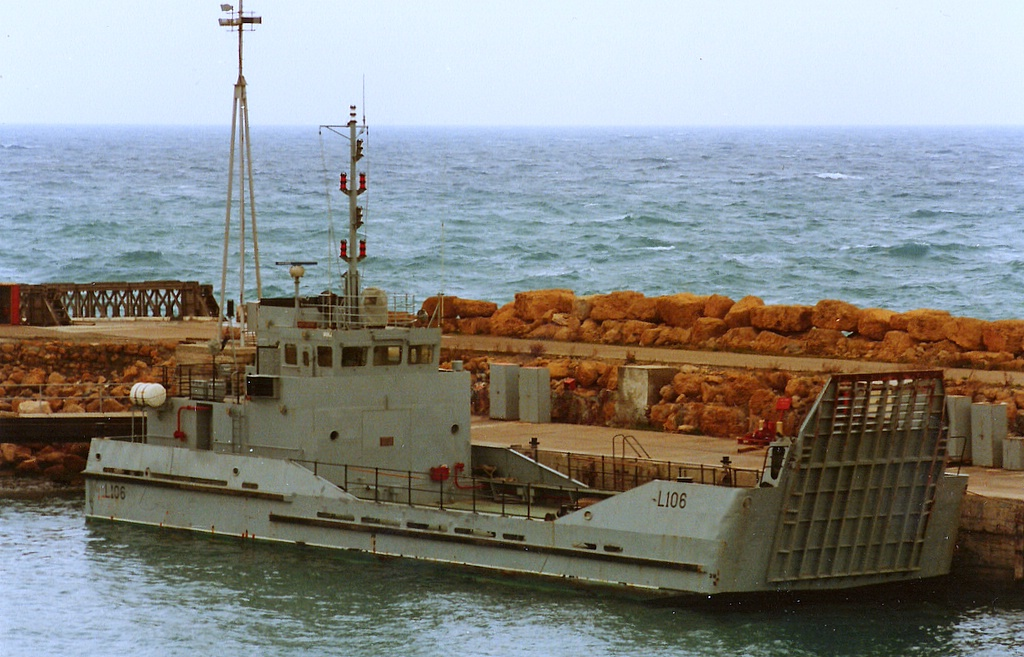
- RCL L106 Antwerp moored in Akrotiri harbour, Cyprus

Class overview
- Builders: Brooke Marine; James & Stone
- Operators: British Army; Ferguson Transport & Shipping
- Built: 1980–1985
- Completed: 9

General characteristics
- Type: Landing craft
- Displacement: 185 GT
- Length: 27.2 m (89 ft)
- Beam: 6.6 m (22 ft)
- Draught: 1 m (3 ft 3 in) bow; 1.6 m (5 ft 3 in) stern
- Propulsion: 2 x Volvo Penta D9MH
- Speed: 9 kn (17 km/h; 10 mph)
- Complement: 6

The ramped craft logistic (RCL) is a type of landing craft operated by 17 Port and Maritime Regiment RLC of the Royal Logistic Corps of the British Army. From the early 1980s onwards it was deployed to replace the RPL (ramped powered lighter). One of their first roles was to provide logistical support during the setting up of the garrison in the Falkland Islands immediately after the Falklands War - this role was conducted by the two first of class, Arromanches and Antwerp, later stationed at the military port at Marchwood, near Southampton, RCLs were originally procured for UK, Cyprus and Hong Kong. The two based at the British base at Akrotiri, Cyprus, Andalsnes and Akyab were operated as 417 Troop of 17 Port and Maritime Regiment RLC. They were sold in 2014

Ferguson Transport and Shipping bought four members of the class and fitted them with Epsilon hydraulic cranes for commercial work, principally around the west coast of Scotland.

== Fleet list ==
There were 9 ramped craft logistic brought into service:

Name	Pennant number	Builder	Ordered	Launched	In service	Fate
Arromanches	L105	James & Stone, Brightlingsea	18 March 1980	6 January 1981	31 July 1981	Sold Renamed Jenna J in 2020. In commercial service for Ferguson Transport & Shipping Ltd.
Antwerp	L106	Brooke Marine, Lowestoft	18 March 1980	9 March 1981	14 August 1981	For sale November 1994
Andalsnes	L107	James & Stone, Brightlingsea	31 March 1983	16 March 1984	22 May 1984	For sale 2014
Abbeville	L108	James & Stone, Brightlingsea	31 March 1983	28 August 1984	9 November 1984	Discarded 1994
Akyab	L109	James & Stone, Brightlingsea	31 March 1983	20 November 1984	21 December 1984	Stricken 2010
Aachen	L110	James & Stone, Brightlingsea	March 1985	25 June 1986	26 January 1987	
Arezzo	L111	James & Stone, Brightlingsea	March 1985	18 November 1986	2 March 1987	Bought by Ferguson Transport & Shipping. Now operating as fish farm feed vessel under the name Carly - registered in Stornoway
Agheila	L112	James & Stone, Brightlingsea	March 1985	27 April 1987	12 June 1987	For sale November 1994
Audemer	L113	James & Stone, Brightlingsea	March 1985	24 June 1987	21 August 1987	Sold 2013. Now in commercial service as Leslie Anne with Ferguson Transport & Shipping.
