= Princess Royal Barracks, Deepcut =

Barracks of the British Army and the Defence School of Logistics

- Camberley, Surrey
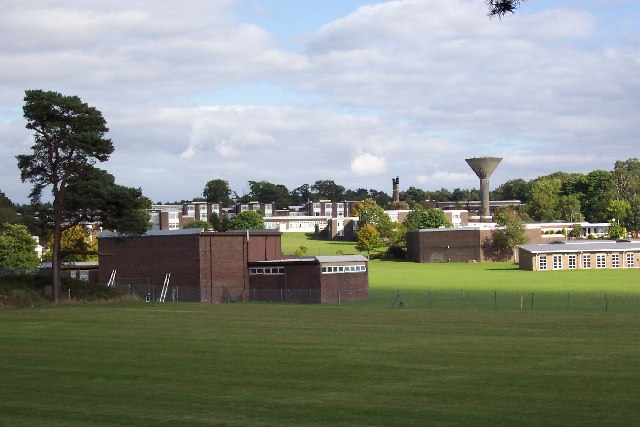
- Deepcut Camp

Site information
- Type: Barracks
- Owner: Ministry of Defence
- Operator: British Army

Location
- Location within Surrey
- Coordinates: 51°18′16″N 00°41′57″W

Site history
- Built: 1900–1903
- Built for: War Office
- In use: 1903–2020

Garrison information
- Occupants: Royal Logistic Corps

The Princess Royal Barracks, Deepcut, commonly referred to as Deepcut Barracks, is a former British Army installation near Camberley, Surrey. It was the headquarters of the Royal Logistic Corps (RLC) and also the Defence College of Logistics, Policing and Administration, before both moved to Worthy Down Camp.

== History ==
The area had been used as a training ground for the army from the late 19th century with no formal military infrastructure until 1900 when the Royal Engineers commenced the build of a number of camps, including Blackdown. The land was owned by the Pain family of Frimley Green who built a number of high status dwellings on the land.

Blackdown Camp was established in the late 1903 initially to accommodate artillery and infantry, centred on Winchester house, renamed Blackdown House when it was appropriated by the War Office for military use. The barracks built in Blackdown Camp were Minden, Dettingen, Alma, Frith, Aisne and Marne Barracks. The Victorian houses were demolished in the 1950s, the land around Blackdown House being left to forestry, and around Dettingen House being redeveloped for a modernised Officers Mess. The site of Aisne and Marne Barracks were also re-developed and used for Military Family Housing. What remained of Frith Barracks were closed in the late 1970s and the land left to vegetation and used as a Military Training Area. Between 1967 and 1971 Minden Barracks was demolished and rebuilt as Blackdown Barracks (renamed Princess Royal Barracks after Anne, Princess Royal).

The Barracks were the garrison of the Royal Army Ordnance Corps, and the School of Ordnance, until it merged into the Royal Logistic Corps in 1993. Dettingen and Alma Barracks have been closed and sold, and by 2002, demolished for housing development.

A decision to sell the barracks was announced in January 2008 by the then Armed Forces Minister Bob Ainsworth, who said that the sale would not take place before 2013. In 2013, following the Defence Training Review and the merger of tri-service logistics training to a single location, it was confirmed that the barracks were to close with the land being released for housing development. Part of the barracks has been demolished to facilitate the construction of the new 1,200 homes in the Mindenhurst neighbourhood. Work on decommissioning the barracks is expected to last until 2021.

== Trainee deaths at Deepcut ==
Between 1995 and 2002 there were four deaths of trainees at the barracks which prompted families, the public and Ministry of Defence itself to call for investigation into any possible links, following four Coroner's commissioned investigations and inquests. One produced a verdict of suicide by gunshot wounds, the other three returned open verdicts. On 3 June 2016, a Coroner's report into the death of Private Cheryl James in 1995 found that the death was "self-inflicted" and that Private James fired the gun intentionally.
