= Royal Corps of Transport =

Former corps of the British Army (1965-1993)

- Royal Corps of Transport regimental badge
- Active: 1965–1993
- Country: United Kingdom
- Branch: British Army
- Garrison/HQ: Buller Barracks, Aldershot
- Mottos: Nil sine labore ("Nothing without labour")
- March: Wait for the Wagon

The Royal Corps of Transport (RCT) was a British Army Corps established to manage all matters in relation to the transport of men and material for the Army and the wider defence forces. It was formed in 1965 and disbanded in 1993; its units and trades were amalgamated into the Royal Logistic Corps. The Depot and Training Regiment RCT was at the former Buller Barracks in Aldershot garrison.

== History ==
The corps was formed in 1965 from the transport (land, water and air) elements of the Royal Army Service Corps (RASC) and the movement control and transportation elements of the Royal Engineers (RE). The Royal Army Service Corps’ functions of supply and transport were separated. The RCT became responsible for transport including ships and launches. whilst supplies became the responsibility of the Royal Army Ordnance Corps. In 1993, following the Options for Change review, the Royal Logistic Corps (RLC) was formed by the amalgamation of The Royal Corps of Transport, the Royal Army Ordnance Corps, the Royal Pioneer Corps, the Army Catering Corps, and the Postal and Courier elements of the Royal Engineers.

== Regiments and Units ==
Regiments of the Royal Corps of Transport, including where known last name up to disbandment:

- 1 Division Regiment RCT
  - 1971 Renamed 1 Division Transport Regiment RCT
  - 1978 Renamed 1 Armoured Division Transport Regiment RCT
- 2 Division Regiment RCT
  - 1973 Renamed 2 Division Transport Regiment RCT,
  - 1983 Renamed 2 Infantry Division Transport Regiment RCT
- 3 Division Regiment RCT
  - Early 70s Renamed 3 Division Transport Regiment RCT,
  - 1977 Renamed 3 Armoured Division Transport Regiment RCT
- 4 Division Regiment RCT
  - 1973 Renamed 4 Division Transport Regiment,
  - 1977 Renamed 4 Armoured Division Transport Regiment
- 7 Tank Transporter Regiment RCT
- 8 Transport Regiment RCT
- 10 Heavy GT Transport Regiment RCT
  - early 70s Renamed 10 Transport Regiment RCT,
  - 1978 Renamed 10 Corps Transport Regiment RCT
- 14 Air Dispatch Regiment RCT Disbanded 1875
- 15 Air Dispatch regiment RCT Disbanded 1968
- 16 Railway Regiment RCT Disbanded 1967
- 17 Port Regiment RCT
  - 1977 Renamed 17 Port & Maritime Regiment RCT
- 20 Landing Craft Tank Regiment RCT
  - 1968: Renamed 20 LCT Support Regiment RCT
  - 1971: Reformed into 20 Maritime Regiment RCT
  - 1977: Renamed Maritime Detachment RCT
  - Mar 79: Renamed 20 Maritime Regiment RCT
- 21 (Northern Ireland) Transport and Movement Regiment RCT
- 23 Transport and Movement Regiment RCT
- 24 Regiment RCT
- 25 Regiment RCT
- 26 Transport and Movement Regiment RCT
- 27 Regiment RCT
- 28 Transport and Movement Regiment RCT
- 29 Movement Control Regiment RCT
  - 1976 Renamed 29 Transport and Movement Regiment RCT
- 30 Regiment
- 31 Regiment
- 32 Regiment RCT
- 33 Maritime Regiment RCT

== Independent Squadrons ==
- H Squadron Horse Transport
- 1 Squadron RCT - Independent from 1970s
- 6 Artillery Support Squadron
- 14 Squadron Bielefeld HQ 1(BR)Corps
- 20 Squadron London District Formed from 20 Company RASC
- 24 Squadron took over 404 Troop Belize 1983
- 38 Squadron RCT Libya Disbanded 1968
  - Reformed early 1970s 38 Sqn RCT
- 44 Squadron Movement Control RCT
  - 1975 Renamed 44 Squadron RCT - Blackdown Barracks Deepcut
  - 1982 Renamed 44 Squadron RCT RMAS - Sandhurst
- 54 Engineer Support & Ambulance Sqn RCT Disbanded 1992
- 62 (Berlin) Sqn RCT
  - 1969: Renamed 62 Transport & Movement Squadron RCT
  - 1979: Renamed 62 Squadron RCT Disbanded 1992
- 70 Movement Control Squadron RCT Disbanded 1972
- 79 Railway Squadron RCT

== Other Units of the RCT ==
- Maritime Group, Royal Corps of Transport
- Headquarters Air Dispatch Group
- 1st Regiment, Royal Malta Artillery Wrexham Bks Mulheim disbanded 1970 - 38 Sqn RCT would assume role.
- 2 Transport Group
- Logistic Support Group Unit RCT
  - 1977 Renamed Logistic Support Group Regiment RCT -
- Gurkha Transport Regiment
- Parachute Logistic Regiment
- Cyprus Logistic Unit

=== Small RCT units ===
- 395 Air Dispatch Troop Part of 29 Tpt & Mov Regt
- MT Troop 22nd Regt Special Air Service
- 401 Troop 1965 - 1967 Benghazi Libya, Moved to Cyprus Aug 67 - no further info
- 402 Troop 1965 Malaya
- 403 Troop Ex 404 Tp RASC 1965 Malaya
- 404 Troop 1966 Libya - 1977 Airport Camp Belize
- 405 Troop 1965 Borneo
- 407 Troop 1982 (Campaign only) Falkland Islands
- 410 Troop Scotland
- 414 Pack Transport Troop 1968 Hong Kong 1976 Disbanded
- 414 Tank Transporter Troop 1976
- 415 Maritime Troop 1970 Hong Kong
- 416 Troop Londonderry 1970
- 460 Port Troop (Falkland Islands) Campaign only
- 486 Movement Control Troop 1965 Berlin Ex RE
- 487 Movement Control Troop 1965 Belgium Ex RE

== TAVR Territorial Army Volunteer Reserve Regiments ==
- 150 Transport Regiment RCT
- 151 Transport Regiment RCT
- 152 Transport Regiment RCT
- 153 Transport Regiment RCT
- 154 Transport Regiment RCT
- 155 Transport Regiment RCT
- 156 Transport Regiment RCT
- 157 Transport Regiment RCT
- 161 Ambulance Regiment RCT
- 162 Movement Control Regiment RCT
- 163 Movement Control Regiment RCT

== Trades ==
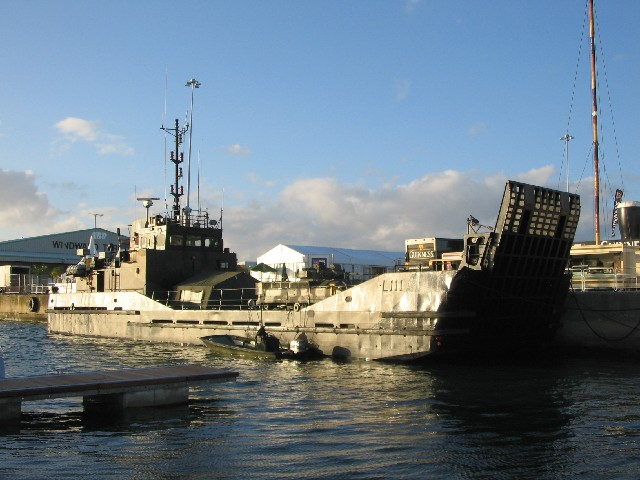
Royal Corps of Transport landing craft, the RCL Arezzo

The Royal Corps of Transport consisted of a number of different specialist trades. These included:

- Driver was the primary trade of the RCT and as such private soldiers held the rank 'Driver'.
  - Driver (Responsible for General Duties and Driver tasks).
  - Driver Radio operator
  - Driver Tank Transporter
  - Driver Air Dispatcher

In conversation, the 'Driver' element was often omitted from these other Driver roles, even though the rank abbreviation of Dvr remained.

Clerical trades also completed basic driver training before going on to specialise

- Clerk - Working within RCT Squadrons.
- Movement controller previously referred to as Traffic Operator

=== Port and Specialised Support Trades, Port and Maritime specialists ===
Again basic driver training was required.

- Driver Port Operator
- Driver Railwayman (79 Railway Squadron RCT)
- Mariner (Seaman)
- Marine Engineer
- Pilot - Hovercraft - for a very short period. Pilot was not really a trade but an appointment.

==== RCT personnel served in additional roles ====
- Staff car Driver could be carried out by any driver trade and additionally by those that carried out the Staff car Driver's course at the Army School of Mechanical Transport - (Later Defence School of Transport).
- Airborne Forces as a Parachutist but stayed in trade, so not for sea, port and railway trades. N.B. Parachutist was never a trade in the RCT. However, 63 Parachute Squadron RCT was part of the Airborne Bde.
- Royal Marines (Commando Logistic Regiment) Having completed the 'Army Commando Course'
- Special Duties Teams in Northern Ireland
- Master Driver, an appointment available to Warrant Officers who had passed Master Driver selection and the Master Driver Course. Passing the course did not automatically guarantee selection for the role. Master Driver appointment remained solely RCT until after amalgamation to RLC when tri-service roles were introduced, as well as international roles.

=== Additional Officer Information ===
- The RCT provided the first Service Support Officer to be the Commanding Officer 22 SAS (Brigadier Andrew Massey RCT, CO 22 SAS 1984–87)
