= List of British Army installations =

This is a list of British Army installations in the United Kingdom, British Overseas Territories, and overseas. This list does not include Army Reserve centres or drill halls.

== Background ==
Under the Army Basing Programme, announced in 2013, more than 100 army units relocated, disbanded, reconfigured or re-roled as part of the government's commitment to bring all units back from Germany by 2020. The programme focused on personnel being increasingly concentrated around Salisbury Plain, Cottesmore, Aldershot, Colchester, Stafford and Catterick, the largest British Army garrison in the world.

In February 2020, the British Army relinquished control of Catterick Barracks, Bielefeld, the last remaining headquarters for British Forces Germany, following 75 years in the country, marking the end of the Army Basing Programme and Operation Owl, and the return of 20,000 British troops.

The British Army retains a presence at a small number of installations primarily in the North Rhine-Westphalia area of Germany as part of what is now known as British Army Germany.

Overseas military bases enable the British Army to conduct expeditionary warfare, "maintain a persistent forward presence", "deter potential adversaries", and train in all environments.

The British Army provides the most significant long-term overseas presence to:

- British Forces Cyprus in Sovereign Base Areas of Akrotiri & Dhekelia,
- British Forces South Atlantic Islands in the Falkland Islands,
- British Forces Gibraltar, including the Royal Gibraltar Regiment.
- British Forces Brunei in Seria, Brunei.

The British Army has a network of permanent operating bases overseas, primarily in:

- British Army Training Unit Kenya,
- British Army Training Unit Suffield, in Canada,
- British Army Training and Support Unit Belize
- Omani-British Joint Training Area, in Oman, used as a Land Regional Hub (LRH).
- British Army Germany and the Sennelager Training Area.

As part of the government's Better Defence Estate strategy, announced in November 2016, the Army plans to, over a period of 25 years, close down and dispose of numerous bases in the UK. This more efficient approach "co-locates people and capabilities in sustainable locations around centres of mass," and also releases land for up to 55,000 new homes.

== United Kingdom ==
=== Garrisons ===
Aldershot Garrison, Hampshire, England

Name	Year opened	Future	Notes and units
Duchess of Kent Barracks	1969		251 Signal Squadron, 10th Signal Regiment, Royal Corps of Signals
Fox Lines			Regimental Headquarters, Royal Army Physical Training Corps; Army School of Physical Training
Gale Barracks			10 Queen's Own Gurkha Logistic Regiment RLC; G Troop, 562 Transport Squadron, 151 (Greater London) Regiment, RLC
Keogh Barracks	1938		2nd Battalion, Ranger Regiment 22 Multi-Role Medical Regiment, RAMC
Lille Barracks			1st Battalion, Grenadier Guards
Mons Barracks			1st Battalion, Irish Guards
Montgomery House			Headquarters, Home Command Headquarters, Regional Command
New Normandy Barracks			4th Battalion, Ranger Regiment
St Omer Barracks			Headquarters, Army Special Operations Brigade Headquarters, 101 Operational Sustainment Brigade; 77 AEC Group (Aldershot), ETS
Taurus House			Headquarters, 11th BrigadeHeadquarters, South East
Travers Barracks			27 Regiment RLC

Tidworth, Netheravon & Bulford Garrison, Wiltshire, England

Name	Year opened	Future	Notes and units
Aliwal Barracks			Royal Tank Regiment; King's Royal Hussars
Assaye Barracks			Queen's Royal Hussars; 2 Medical Regiment, Royal Army Medical Corps
Bhurtpore Barracks			1st Armoured Medical Regiment, Royal Army Medical Corps
Campion Lines			Headquarters, Defence Serious Crime Unit (DSCU)
Candahar Barracks			10 AEC Group (Tidworth), ETS
Delhi Barracks			Headquarters, 3rd Deep Reconnaissance Strike Brigade; 6th Armoured Close Support Battalion, REME
Jellalabad Barracks			Headquarters South West; 4th Armoured Close Support Battalion, REME
Kiwi Barracks			Headquarters, 3rd Regiment, Royal Military Police
Lucknow Barracks			1st Battalion, Royal Welsh
Mooltan Barracks			1st Battalion, Royal Regiment of Fusiliers
Airfield Camp, Netheravon			Joint Service Parachute Wing Netheravon (JSPWN) Headquarters, Army Parachute Association
Picton Barracks			Headquarters, 3rd (United Kingdom) Division; 3rd (UK) Division Signal Regiment, Royal Corps of Signals; 1st Battalion, Mercian Regiment; Headquarters, 7th Signals Group
Powle Lines			Household Cavalry Regiment
Prince Philip Lines			3 Armoured Close Support Battalion REME
Swinton Barracks			1 Signal Regiment 15 Signal Regiment; 22 Engineer Regiment; 26 Engineer Regiment
Ward Barracks			Headquarters, 12th Armoured Infantry Brigade Combat Team; 4 Military Intelligence Battalion; 5th Battalion, The Rifles
Wing Barracks	1897		Headquarters, 25 (Close Support) Engineer Group

Catterick Garrison, North Yorkshire, England

Name	Year opened	Future	Notes and units
Alma Lines			1st Battalion, Royal Yorkshire Regiment
Bourlon Barracks			Headquarters North Headquarters, 4th Light Brigade Combat Team Headquarters, Catterick Garrison The Highlanders, 4th Battalion, Royal Regiment of Scotland; 1st Military Intelligence Battalion, Intelligence Corps
Cambrai Barracks			The Royal Lancers (Queen Elizabeths' Own)
Gaza Barracks			The Light Dragoons; 3 Medical Regiment, Royal Army Medical Corps; 1st Regiment, Royal Military Police
Helles Barracks			Infantry Training Centre
Marne Barracks	1994 (Note: ex-RAF Catterick)		5th Regiment, Royal Artillery4/73 (Sphinx) Special Observation Post Battery; 32nd Engineer Regiment, Royal Engineers
Megiddo Lines			1 Close Support Battalion REME
Piave Lines			521 EOD Squadron Catterick Military Court Centre
Somme Barracks			1st Battalion, Scots Guards
Vimy Barracks			3 AEC Group (Catterick), ETS

Colchester Garrison, Essex, England

Name	Year opened	Future	Notes and units
Berechurch Hall Camp			Military Corrective Training Centre
Goojerat Barracks			156 Provost Company
Merville Barracks			Headquarters, 16 Air Assault Brigade Combat TeamThe Pathfinder Platoon; 2nd Battalion, Parachute Regiment; 3rd Battalion, Parachute Regiment; 16 (Close Support) Medical Regiment; 216 Parachute Signal Squadron; 7th Parachute Regiment, Royal Horse Artillery; 13 Air Assault Support Regiment, RLC; 18 AEC Group (Colchester), ETS 16 VHR MI Coy, Intelligence Corps

Edinburgh Garrison, Edinburgh, Scotland

Name	Year opened	Future	Notes and units
Edinburgh Castle	1103		Regimental Headquarters, Royal Regiment of Scotland
Dreghorn Barracks	1939		3rd Battalion, The Rifles. Edinburgh Troop, 521 EOD Squadron, 11 Explosive Ordnance Disposal and Search Regiment, RLC
Glencorse Barracks	1803		Royal Highland Fusiliers, 2nd Battalion, Royal Regiment of Scotland Army Assessment Centre, Glencorse
Redford Barracks	1915	Set to close in 2029.	51st Infantry Brigade and Headquarters Scotland Balaklava Company, 5th Battalion, The Royal Regiment of Scotland; 27 AEC Group (Edinburgh), ETS Headquarters, 5 Military Intelligence Battalion, Intelligence Corps Army School of Bagpipe Music and Highland Drumming

Larkhill Garrison, Wiltshire, England

Name	Year opened	Future	Notes and units
Horne Barracks			47th Regiment Royal Artillery
Purvis Lines			26th Regiment Royal Artillery19th Regiment Royal Artillery
Roberts Barracks			32nd Regiment Royal Artillery
Royal Artillery Barracks, Larkhill			Royal School of Artillery; 14th (Training) Regiment, Royal Artillery 12 AEC Group (Larkhill), ETS

London Garrison, London, England

Name	Year opened	Future	Notes and units
Tower of London	1078		Regimental Headquarters, Royal Regiment of Fusiliers Regimental Headquarters, Princess of Wales's Royal Regiment
Hyde Park Barracks	1795		Household Cavalry Mounted Regiment
Horse Guards	1759		Headquarters, London District
Regent's Park Barracks	1896		20 Transport Squadron, Royal Logistic Corps; Regimental Headquarters, Queen's Royal Hussars; Regimental Headquarters, 21 SAS (Artists) (R)
Royal Artillery Barracks, Woolwich	1802	Set to close in 2028.	1st Battalion, Princess of Wales's Royal Regiment 100th (Yeomanry) Regiment Royal Artillery; Countess of Wessex's String Orchestra; 30 AEC Group (Woolwich), ETS
Napier Lines	1802		The King's Troop, Royal Horse Artillery
Wellington Barracks	1833		Headquarters, Guards Division Public Duties Incremental Companies: Nijmegen Company, Grenadier Guards; No.7 Company, Coldstream Guards; F Company, Scots Guards; No.9 Company, Irish Guards; No.12 Company, Irish Guards

Pirbright Garrison, Surrey, England

Name	Year opened	Future	Notes and units
Alexander Barracks	1875		Army Training Centre, Pirbright: 1st Army Training Regiment; 2nd Army Training Regiment; Headquarters Regiment; Army Assessment Centre, Pirbright
Brunswick Lines	1875		Household Division and Parachute Regiment Centralised Courses
Elizabeth Barracks	2011		3rd Battalion, Ranger Regiment

Warminster Garrison, Wiltshire, England

Name	Year opened	Future	Notes and units
Battlesbury Barracks	1938		Headquarters, Experimentation and Trials Group; Royal Dragoon Guards; 12 AEC Group (Warminster), ETS
Harman Lines	1975		Falcon (CBRN) Squadron, Royal Tank Regiment (28 Engineer Regt); Land Warfare Centre Battlegroup Light Aid Detachment, REME
Waterloo Lines	1945		Headquarters, Land Warfare Centre; Headquarters, Infantry; Headquarters, Small Arms School Corps; Specialist Weapons School Combat Manoeuvre Centre; Gurkha Company (Tavoleto) – OPFOR role Junior Staff Centre; Combined Arms Tactical Trainer; Infantry Trials and Development Unit; Reconnaissance and Armoured Tactics Division

Bovington Garrison, Dorset, England

Name	Year opened	Future	Notes and units
Allenby Barracks	1899		Headquarters, Royal Armoured Corps Regimental Headquarters, Royal Wessex Yeomanry; The Armour Centre
Lulworth Camp	1918		Armoured Fighting Vehicle Gunnery School

Winchester Garrison, Hampshire, England

Name	Year opened	Future	Notes and units
Peninsula Barracks			Home Headquarters (South), King's Royal Hussars; Regimental Headquarters, The Rifles
Sir John Moore Barracks, Winchester	1986 (Note: ex-RAF Flowerdown)	Set to close in 2026.	Army Training Regiment, Winchester
Worthy Down Camp	1960		Defence College of Logistics, Policing and Administration Headquarters, Adjutant General's Corps Headquarters, Royal Logistic Corps

Blandford Garrison, Dorset, England

Name	Year opened	Future	Notes and units
Blandford Camp	1724		Headquarters, Royal Corps of Signals Headquarters, Defence School of Communications and Information Systems; 11 (Royal School of Signals) Signal Regiment; 13 Signal Regiment 280 Signal Squadron, 1st NATO Signal Battalion Communication Information Systems (CIS) Trails and Development Unit (CISTDU)

York Garrison, North Yorkshire, England

Name	Year opened	Future	Notes and units
Imphal Barracks	1880	Set to close in 2030.	Headquarters, 1st (United Kingdom) Division Headquarters, 19th Brigade; 2 Signal Regiment; 12 Military Intelligence Company, 1 Military Intelligence Battalion; 3 AEC Group (York), ETS
Queen Elizabeth Barracks	1884		Headquarters, 2 Medical Group; 21 Multi-Role Medical Regiment, Royal Army Medical Corps

Hereford Garrison, Herefordshire, England

Name	Year opened	Future	Notes and units
Pontrilas Camp	Pre-WW2		SAS counter-terrorism training area.
Stirling Lines	1999 (Note: ex-RAF Credenhill)		22 Special Air Service Regiment Special Reconnaissance Regiment 264 Signal Squadron (SAS) 267 Signal Squadron (SRR) No. 658 Squadron (AAC)

=== Barracks ===
Name	Town	Constituent Country	County	Year opened	Future	Notes and units
Alanbrooke Barracks	Topcliffe	England	North Yorkshire	1972 (Note: ex-RAF Topcliffe)	Set to close in 2031.	4th Regiment Royal Artillery
Alexander Barracks, Aldergrove Flying Station	Aldergrove	Northern Ireland	County Antrim	1918		321 EOD & Search Squadron, RLC
Albemarle Barracks	Ouston	England	Northumberland	1970 (Note: ex-RAF Ouston)		3rd Regiment Royal Horse Artillery
Armoury House	Finsbury	England	London	1735		Honourable Artillery Company
Azimghur Barracks	Colerne	England	Wiltshire	1976 (Note: ex-RAF Colerne)	Set to close in 2029.	21 Signal Regiment
Baker Barracks	Thorney Island	England	West Sussex	1984 (Note: ex-RAF Thorney Island)		Headquarters, 7th Air Defence Group; 12th Regiment Royal Artillery; 16th Regiment Royal Artillery; Ground Based Air Defence Wing
Bassingbourn Barracks	Bassingbourn	England	Cambridgeshire	2018		Mission Ready Training Centre (MRTC)
Beachley Barracks	Chepstow	England	Gloucestershire	1915	Set to close in 2029.	1st Battalion, The Rifles; 20 AEC Group (Chepstow), ETS
Beacon Barracks	Stafford	England	Staffordshire	2006 (Note: ex-RAF Stafford)		16 Signal Regiment; 22 Signal Regiment; 20 AEC Group (Stafford), ETS
Brecon Barracks	Brecon	Wales	Powys	1805		160th (Welsh) Brigade
Brompton Barracks	Chatham	England	Kent	1812		Regimental Headquarters, Royal Engineers Royal School of Military Engineering (Chatham); 30 AEC Group (Chatham), ETS
Buckley Barracks	Hullavington	England	Wiltshire	1993 (Note: ex-RAF Hullavington)	Set to close in 2029.	9 Regiment RLC
Caerwent Training Area	Caerwent	Wales	Monmouthshire	Due to open 2027		Site under construction. From 2027 will host Queen's Dragoon Guards and 1st Battalion, The Rifles
Cameron Barracks	Inverness	Scotland	Inverness-shire	1884		Regimental Headquarters, The Highlanders, 4th Battalion, Royal Regiment of Scotland Cameron Barracks is a key site for accommodating up to 335 exercising troops in the Scottish Highlands.
Carlton Barracks	Leeds	England	West Yorkshire	1865		
Carver Barracks	Saffron Walden	England	Essex	1974 (Note: ex-RAF Debden)		33 Engineer Regiment (EOD&S); 35 Engineer Regiment (EOD&S)
Cawdor Barracks	Brawdy	Wales	Pembrokeshire	1995 (Note: ex-RAF Brawdy)	Set to close in 2028.	14 Signal Regiment (Electronic Warfare)
Chetwynd Barracks	Chilwell	England	Nottinghamshire	1919	Set to close in 2026.	43 Headquarters and Support Squadron Royal Engineers 62 Works Group RE 63 Works Group RE 65 (Reserve) Works Group RE 66 Works Group RE Nottingham Troop, 721 Explosive Ordnance Disposal Squadron RLC
Claro Barracks	Ripon	England	North Yorkshire	1915	Set to close in 2026.	21 Engineer Regiment
Clive Barracks	Ternhill	England	Shropshire	1976 (Note: ex-RAF Ternhill)	Set to close in 2029.	1st Battalion, The Royal Irish Regiment
Combermere Barracks	Windsor	England	Berkshire	1804		1st Battalion, Welsh Guards Household Cavalry Training Wing 30 AEC Group (Windsor), ETS
Countess of Wessex Lines, MOD Lyneham	Lyneham	England	Wiltshire	2022		5th Force Support Battalion, REME
Dale Barracks	Chester	England	Cheshire	1939	Set to close in 2029.	2nd Battalion, Royal Yorkshire Regiment
Dalton Barracks	Abingdon	England	Oxfordshire	1992 (Note: ex-RAF Abingdon)	Set to close in 2030.	4 Regiment, RLC
Defence CBRN Centre	Winterbourne Gunner	England	Wiltshire	1917		Defence Chemical Biological Radiological and Nuclear Centre (DCBRNC): Defence CBRN School; Defence CBRN Technical Support Group
Denison Barracks	Hermitage	England	Berkshire	1949		77th Brigade; Specialist Group Military Intelligence; Royal School of Military Survey
Dering Lines	Brecon	Wales	Powys	1939		Infantry Battle SchoolGurkha Wing (Mandalay)
Dishforth Airfield	Dishforth	England	North Yorkshire	1992		6 Regiment, RLC
Duke of Gloucester Barracks	South Cerney	England	Gloucestershire	1971 (Note: ex-RAF South Cerney)		Headquarters, 104th Theatre Sustainment Brigade; Joint Air Mounting Centre; 29 Postal Courier & Movement Regiment
Fenham Barracks	Newcastle	England	Tyne and Wear	1806		Queen's Own Yeomanry
Fort George	Ardersier	Scotland	Inverness-shire	1757	Set to close in 2032.	The Black Watch, 3rd Battalion, Royal Regiment of Scotland 27 AEC Gp (Fort George), ETS
Fulwood Barracks	Preston	England	Lancashire	1848	Set to close in 2030.	Home Headquarters (North), King's Royal Hussars; Regimental Headquarters, Duke of Lancaster's Regiment; 32 AEC Group (Preston), ETS
Gamecock Barracks	Bramcote	England	Warwickshire	1959 (Note: ex-RAF Bramcote)		30 Signal Regiment 20 AEC Group (Bramcote), ETS
Gibraltar Barracks	Minley	England	Hampshire			Headquarters, 8th Engineer Brigade Headquarters, Royal Corps of Army Music Royal School of Military Engineering Group: 3 Royal School of Military Engineering (3 RSME) Regiment; Combat Engineer School; Mine Information and Training Centre; Royal Engineers Trials and Development Unit; Royal Engineers Warfare Wing
Imjin Barracks	Innsworth	England	Gloucestershire	2010 (Note: ex-RAF Innsworth)		Allied Rapid Reaction Corps; Headquarters, 1st Signal Brigade; Gurkha ARRC Support Battalion
Invicta Park Barracks	Maidstone	England	Kent	1936	Set to close in 2029.	36 Engineer Regiment
John Howard Barracks	Milton Keynes	England	Buckinghamshire			299 Signal Squadron (Special Communications)
Kendrew Barracks	Cottesmore	England	Rutland	2012 (Note: ex-RAF Cottesmore)		1st Battalion, Royal Anglian Regiment 2nd Battalion, Royal Anglian Regiment; 7 Regiment RLC
Kimberley Barracks	Preston	England	Lancashire	1940	Set to close in 2027.	4th Battalion, Duke of Lancaster's Regiment
Kinloss Barracks	Kinloss	Scotland	Moray	2012 (Note: ex-RAF Kinloss)		39 Engineer Regiment 71 Engineer Regiment (Air Support); 27 AEC Group (Kinloss), ETS
Leuchars Station	Leuchars	Scotland	Fife	2015 (Note: ex-RAF Leuchars)		Royal Scots Dragoon Guards; 2 Close Support Battalion, REME; 110 Provost Company, 1st Regiment, RMP Regimental Headquarters, 71 Engineer Regiment
Leighton House	Westbury	England	Wiltshire	1949		Army Officer Selection Board
Longmoor Camp	Longmoor	England	Hampshire	1863		Close Protection Unit, RMP
Maindy Barracks	Cardiff	Wales	Cardiff	1877		Home Headquarters, Queen's Dragoon Guards; Regimental Headquarters, Royal Welsh; 157th (Welsh) Regiment, RLC
Marlborough Lines	Andover	England	Hampshire	2009		Army Headquarters Headquarters, Field Army Troops; Headquarters, Joint Aviation Command Headquarters, 1st Military Police Brigade; Regimental Headquarters, Royal Army Chaplains' Department
McMullen Barracks	Marchwood	England	Hampshire	1943		17 Port and Maritime Regiment RLC Base-port for several Royal Fleet Auxiliary ships.
Middle Wallop Flying Station	Middle Wallop	England	Hampshire			Headquarters, Army Air Corps; Headquarters, 1st Aviation Brigade Combat Team; 2 (Training) Regiment, AAC; 7 (Training) Regiment, AAC5 Regiment AAC Headquarters, 6 Regiment, AAC
MOD Chicksands	Chicksands	England	Bedfordshire		Set to close in 2030.	Headquarters, Intelligence Corps Joint Intelligence Training Group
MOD Corsham	Corsham	England	Wiltshire	1936		Global Operations Security Control Centre (GOSCC), Joint Security Co-ordination Centre (JSyCC), Defence Digital Operations, Headquarters, 10 Signal Regiment
Marlborough Barracks, MOD Kineton	Kineton	England	Warwickshire	1941		Defence Munitions Kineton, largest ammunitions depot in Western Europe.Defence Explosive Ordnance Disposal (EOD), Munitions and Search (DEMS) Training Regiment
MOD St Athan	St Athan	Wales	Vale of Glamorgan			Special Forces Support Group (SFSG); 1st Battalion, Parachute Regiment 268 (SFSG) Signals Squadron
Monmouth Castle	Monmouth	Wales	Monmouthshire	1067		Regimental Headquarters, Royal Monmouthshire Royal Engineers
Normandy Barracks	Leconfield	England	East Riding of Yorkshire	1965 (Note: ex-RAF Leconfield)		25 Training Regiment, RLC; Defence School of Transport
Palace Barracks	Holywood	Northern Ireland	County Down	1886		1st Battalion, Ranger Regiment; Regimental Headquarters, 152 (North Irish) Regiment, Royal Logistic Corps; Regimental Headquarters, Royal Irish Regiment
Prince Philip Barracks, MOD Lyneham	Lyneham	England	Wiltshire	2015 (Note: ex-RAF Lyneham)		Headquarters, Royal Electrical and Mechanical EngineersSchool of Army Aeronautical Engineering (SAAE) Defence School of Electronic and Mechanical Engineering; 8 Training Battalion, REME
Prince William of Gloucester Barracks	Grantham	England	Lincolnshire	1976 (Note: ex-RAF Spitalgate)	Set to close in 2028.	Headquarters, 102nd Operational Sustainment Brigade; 167 Catering Support Regiment RLC; Regimental Headquarters, Royal Lancers; Army Training Regiment, Grantham
Raglan Barracks	Newport	Wales	Newport	1845		Headquarters, 104th Regiment Royal Artillery E Squadron, 21 SAS 74 MI Company, 7 Military Intelligence Battalion Detachment, 4th Battalion Parachute Regiment
Remount Barracks	Melton Mowbray	England	Leicestershire	1946		Defence Animal Training Regiment
Robertson Barracks	Swanton Morley	England	Norfolk	1995 (Note: ex-RAF Swanton Morley)	Set to close in 2029.	1st The Queen's Dragoon Guards
Robertson House	Camberley	England	Berkshire	1802		Headquarters, Army Medical Services: Headquarters, Royal Army Medical Service; Headquarters, Royal Army Veterinary Corps; Centre for Army Leadership
Rock Barracks	Woodbridge	England	Suffolk	2006 (Note: ex-RAF Woodbridge)		23 Parachute Engineer Regiment28 Engineer Regiment (C-CBRN)
Royal Citadel	Plymouth	England	Devon	1598	Set to close in 2035.	29th Commando Regiment, Royal Artillery
RMA Sandhurst	Sandhurst	England	Berkshire	1947		Royal Military Academy Sandhurst Headquarters, Brigade of Gurkhas; Centre for Army Leadership
Sir John Moore Barracks, Shorncliffe	Folkestone	England	Kent			Either 1st Battalion or 2nd Battalion, Royal Gurkha Rifles
St Barbara's Barracks, MOD Ashchurch	Ashchurch	England	Gloucestershire			Defence Equipment & Support Ashchurch, the Army's vehicle storage and maintenance facility. Headquarters, 721 EOD Squadron, RLC
St David's Barracks, MOD Bicester	Bicester	England	Oxfordshire		Set to close in 2028.	1 Regiment RLC; 77 AEC Gp (Bicester), ETS
St George's Barracks, MOD Bicester	Bicester	England	Oxfordshire			Defence Explosive Ordnance Disposal (EOD), Munitions and Search (DEMS) Training Regiment
St George's Barracks	North Luffenham	England	Rutland	2006 (Note: ex-RAF North Luffenham)	Set to close in 2026.	1st Military Working Dog Regiment; 18 AEC Group (NLuffenham), ETS
Thiepval Barracks	Lisburn	Northern Ireland	County Antrim	1954		Headquarters, 38th (Irish) Brigade; Headquarters, 2nd Battalion, Royal Irish Regiment 2nd Battalion, The Rifles 32 AEC Group (Lisburn), ETS
Trenchard Lines	Upavon	England	Wiltshire	1992 (Note: ex-RAF Upavon)		Headquarters, Intelligence, Surveillance, and Reconnaissance Group 2 Military Intelligence (Exploitation) Battalion Headquarters, Army Adventurous Training Group
Uniacke Barracks	Harrogate	England	North Yorkshire	1947		Army Foundation College
Vauxhall Barracks	Didcot	England	Oxfordshire		Set to close in 2034.	Headquarters, 11 Explosive Ordnance Disposal and Search Regiment, RLC: 421 EOD & Search Squadron
Venning & Parsons Barracks	Donnington	England	Shropshire	1936	Set to close in 2029.	174 Provost Company, Royal Military Police
Victoria Barracks	Windsor	England	Berkshire	1853		1st Battalion, Coldstream Guards
Victoria Barracks, Ballater	Ballater	Scotland	Aberdeenshire	1850		Houses the Royal Regiment of Scotland's Royal Guard while the Monarch is residing at Balmoral Castle
Walcheren Barracks	Maryhill	Scotland	Glasgow	1935		Headquarters, HQ Company, and C Company, 6th Battalion, The Royal Regiment of Scotland
Wattisham Flying Station	Wattisham	England	Suffolk	1913		3 Regiment AAC 4 Regiment AAC HQ Squadron and 677 Squadron, 6 Regiment AAC 7 Aviation Support Battalion, REME 18 AEC Gp (Wattisham), ETS
Weeton Barracks	Weeton-with-Preese	England	Lancashire	1916		1st Battalion, Duke of Lancaster's Regiment
DMS Whittington	Lichfield	England	Staffordshire	1877		Headquarters, Defence Medical Services Regimental Headquarters, Mercian Regiment Defence Medical Academy Army Assessment Centre, Lichfield
Wyvern Barracks	Exeter	England	Devon	1800		Headquarters, HQ Company, and Assault Pioneer Platoon, 6th Battalion, The Rifles

=== Major Defence Training Areas ===
Name	Constituent Country	County	Year opened	Notes and units
Castlemartin	Wales	Pembrokeshire	1938	Tank and armoured vehicle live firing range.
Catterick	England	North Yorkshire	1921	Consists of numerous live firing ranges, an urban warfare village 'Whinny Hill', and 9,000 acres of dry training areas (non-live firing).
Dartmoor	England	Devon	1800	
Garelochhead	Scotland	Argyll and Bute	1940	
Otterburn	England	Northumberland	1911	The only place in the UK where the MLRS can be fired.
Salisbury Plain	England	Wiltshire	1898	The largest training area in the UK, primarily used by the 3rd Division. Contains an urban warfare village 'Copehill Down'.
Sennybridge	Wales	Powys	1939	Located in the Brecon Beacons and hosts live firing and dry training activities. Hills Phase of UK Special Forces selection takes place here.
Stanford	England	Norfolk	1942	Contains a mock Afghanistan village and complex trench facilities, now used primarily for training the Ukrainian Armed Forces.
Warcop	England	Cumbria	1942	

== British Overseas Territories ==
=== Falkland Islands ===
Name	Part of	Country	Region	Opened	Description
Mount Pleasant Complex	British Forces South Atlantic Islands	Falkland Islands	East Falkland	1985	Headquarters for British Force South Atlantic Islands with approximately 1,300 military personnel deployed, made up of a roulement infantry company, an air defence battery from 16th Regiment RA, an engineer squadron, a signals unit, a logistics group and supporting services.
Falklands Defence Force HQ	British Forces South Atlantic Islands	Falkland Islands	Stanley		Headquarters for the Falkland Islands Defence Force (FIDF), the locally maintained volunteer defence unit in the Falkland Islands.

=== Gibraltar ===
British Forces Gibraltar (BFG) maintains the garrison at Gibraltar.

Name	Part of	Country	Region	Opened	Units
Devil's Tower Camp	British Forces Gibraltar	Gibraltar		1942	Regimental Headquarters, Royal Gibraltar Regiment
Four Corners Estate	British Forces Gibraltar	Gibraltar			
Tunnels of Gibraltar	British Forces Gibraltar	Gibraltar		1782	34 Miles of tunnels offer a unique training ground for British Forces Gibraltar. Whilst expansion of the network ceased in 1968 and some areas have been turned over to the Civil Administration of Gibraltar, most of the network remains in MOD ownership.

=== Sovereign Base Areas of Akrotiri and Dhekelia ===
The two British enclaves in the Republic of Cyprus act as platforms for the projection of British military assets in the Eastern Mediterranean and the Middle East. The enclaves serve as centres for regional communications monitoring from the eastern Mediterranean through the Middle East to Iran. Facilities within the retained areas also support British military activities on retained sites in the Republic of Cyprus and provide unique training opportunities.

Western Sovereign Base Area
Name	Part of	Country	Region	Opened	Units
Episkopi Cantonment	British Forces Cyprus	Sovereign Base Areas of Akrotiri and Dhekelia	Western Sovereign Base Area	Sovereign Base Areas established in 1960	Headquarters, British Forces Cyprus The 'Resident Infantry Battalion', currently 1st Battalion, Princess of Wales's Royal Regiment, until 2026.
Paramali North and South Quarters	British Forces Cyprus	Sovereign Base Areas of Akrotiri and Dhekelia	Western Sovereign Base Area	Sovereign Base Areas established in 1960	

Eastern Sovereign Base Area
Name	Part of	Country	Region	Opened	Units
Alexander Barracks	British Forces Cyprus	Sovereign Base Areas of Akrotiri and Dhekelia	Eastern Sovereign Base Area	Sovereign Base Areas established in 1960	The 'Regional Standby Battalion', currently 1st Battalion, The Rifles, until summer 2025.
Ayios Nikolaos Station	British Forces Cyprus	Sovereign Base Areas of Akrotiri and Dhekelia	Eastern Sovereign Base Area	Sovereign Base Areas established in 1960	The Joint Service Signal Unit (JSSU), a static communications organisation maintaining secure links from Cyprus to the rest of the world. The station is a significant centre for GCHQ's collection of signals data and intelligence from the Eastern Mediterranean region and Middle East.
Dhekelia Cantonment	British Forces Cyprus	Sovereign Base Areas of Akrotiri and Dhekelia	Eastern Sovereign Base Area	Sovereign Base Areas established in 1960	Headquarters of the Eastern Sovereign Base Area An engineer squadron, and various logistic units, as well as UK-based civilians and dependents.
Nightingale Barracks	British Forces Cyprus	Sovereign Base Areas of Akrotiri and Dhekelia	Eastern Sovereign Base Area		

== Overseas ==
=== Belize ===
Name	Part of	Country	County	Opened	Description
Price Barracks	British Army Training Support Unit Belize (BATSUB)	Belize	Belize District		A small permanent team maintains 25 Service Family Accommodation quarters, enough accommodation for 600 troops on exercise and various associated buildings, as well as three satellite camps in the Baldy Beacons area of Belize.
Baldy Beacon and Guacamollo Bridge Training Areas	British Army Training Support Unit Belize (BATSUB)	Belize	Belize District		
Mountain Pine Ridge Training Area	British Army Training Support Unit Belize (BATSUB)	Belize	Belize District		

=== Brunei ===
Around 2000 personnel of the British Army, primarily from the 1st Battalion Royal Gurkha Rifles, are stationed at the various sites of Brunei Garrison in the sultanate of Brunei Darussalam (the United Kingdom's largest remaining east of Suez deployment), under the control of British Forces Brunei (BFB). Medicina Lines, Tuker Lines, and Scout Base are close to the Bruneian town of Seria within Mukim Seria, Belait District, whilst the more isolated placement of Sittang Camp in Tutong District reflects its role as a Jungle Training Centre.

Brunei Garrison, British Forces Brunei, Brunei Darussalam
Name	Part of	Country	District	Opened	Description
Medicina Lines	British; Forces Brunei	Brunei; Darussalam	Belait District	1959	Located near the Bruneian town Seria within Mukim Seria, it includes headquarters British Army Jungle Warfare Division (JWD), which run the courses: Operational Tracking Instructors Course (OTIC); Jungle Warfare Instructors Course (JWIC)
Sittang Camp	British; Forces Brunei	Brunei; Darussalam	Tutong District	1959	Jungle training facility; staff and troops live in the jungle during training
Tuker Lines	British; Forces Brunei	Brunei; Darussalam	Belait District	1959	Home to the Headquarters, British Forces Brunei and 1st Battalion, Royal Gurkha Rifles (the 1st and 2nd Battalions alternate between Brunei and Kent every three years), as well as: Brunei Police Unit, Royal Military Police; Brunei Signal Troop, Queen's Gurkha Signals; Logistic Support Troop (British Forces Brunei), Royal Logistic Corps

=== Canada ===
Following the withdrawal of the RAF from CFB Goose Bay, the sole British deployment in Canada is the Army Training Unit at Suffield.

Name	Part of	Country	County	Opened	Units
CFB Suffield	British Army Training Unit Suffield	Canada	Alberta	In use by the British Army Since 1971.	BATUS is the British Army's largest armoured training facility, and it can accommodate live-firing and tactical effect simulation (TES) exercises up to battle group level.: 105 Logistic Support Squadron (BATUS), RLC; BATUS REME Workshop; Resident OPFOR - rotated every year. This is made up of either an armoured regiment or infantry battalion.; 400 permanent staff; 1000 temporary deployed soldiers in training; In excess of 1000 vehicles including Challenger 2, Warrior, Bulldog, Trojan, AS-90, Titan.

=== Cyprus ===
In addition to the Sovereign Base Areas of Akrotiri and Dhekelia, the 1960 Treaty of Establishment between the United Kingdom and the Republic of Cyprus granted the UK the right to permanently make use of 40 further sites on the island for military purposes. Britain also makes a permanent contribution to the United Nations Peacekeeping Force in Cyprus.

Name	Part of	Country	County	Opened	Units
Blue Beret Camp	United Nations Peacekeeping Force in Cyprus	Cyprus	Nicosia	1964	Groups of British soldiers are deployed as part of the nine-member United Nations Force which patrols the UNPA to prevent a resurgence of violence between Greek and Turkish Cypriot communities. They are operationally distinct from British Forces Cyprus.: Currently, 4th Battalion, Parachute Regiment is deployed on Operation Tosca.

=== Czech Republic ===
Name	Part of	Country	County	Opened	Units
Military Academy in Vyškov	British Military Advisory Training Team in the Czech Republic (BMATT)	Czech Republic	Vyškov	2000	A small team that provides military training courses to the Czech Armed Forces and partner countries (primarily drawn from Central and Eastern Europe, the Balkans and the Caucasus) in order to develop their military's capabilities to participate in regional stability and multinational peace support operations. The following courses are conducted at the Military Academy in Vyškov: Senior Officer Briefing; Officer Command & Leadership Course; Junior Command & Leadership Course; Instructor Training Course; Marksmanship Coaching Course

=== Estonia ===
Name	Part of	Country	County	Opened	Units
Tapa Army Base	NATO Enhanced Forward Presence	Estonia	Tapa	2017	Operation CABRIT is the name of the British Army's operational deployment to Estonia as part of the NATO Enhanced Forward Presence (EFP). It is a brigade-sized deployment involving more than 1,500 British troops, with a large majority being armoured tank, cavalry, artillery and infantry personnel.

=== Germany ===
In 2010 approximately 25,000 British soldiers were permanently based in western Germany, a legacy of World War II and the Cold War. Facilities in Germany are no longer strategically useful, therefore British Forces began withdrawing from Germany in 2010; in 2015 21,500 troops remained in the country. The deployment had been phased out by 2020, although concentrations of installations and troops in the Mönchengladbach / Paderborn area will remain.

Name	City	Country	County	Units
Normandy Barracks	Paderborn	Germany	North Rhine-Westphalia	Headquarters, British Army Germany: Commander, British Army Germany; Germany Enabling Office (GEO); Germany Support Unit; Sennelager Training Area: Command and Staff Trainer; Combined Arms Tactical Trainer; Combat Ready Training Centre.; 23 Amphibious Engineer Squadron, Royal Engineers (also located in Minden). Exercising Troops accommodation.
Athlone Barracks	Paderborn	Germany	North Rhine-Westphalia	Land Training Fleet (Sennelager) - which provides and maintains a pool of military vehicles for units in training at Sennelager; thus units in training do not need to bring their own vehicles for the time of the exercise.
Ayrshire Barracks	Mönchengladbach	Germany	North Rhine-Westphalia	Stored Equipment Fleet (Germany) - storage depot of vehicles and other equipment for exercises and operations around Europe.
Wulfen Defence Munitions Storage Facility	Dorsten	Germany	North Rhine-Westphalia	Munitions storage facility.

=== Nepal ===
The British Army presence in Nepal is related to the Brigade of Gurkhas. British Gurkhas Nepal manages the recruitment of soldiers, the care of families and ensures the rights of veterans.

Name	Garrison	Country	County	Opened	Notes
HQ Jawalakhel, Patan	British Gurkhas Nepal	Nepal	Kathmandu		The Headquarters British Gurkhas Nepal and the Kathmandu station, which is the focal point for organisation of transit to and from Nepal, the welfare of serving soldiers and payment of pensions. Supported by the Nepal Signal Troop, Queen's Gurkha Signals.
Pokhara Camp	British Gurkhas Nepal	Nepal			The British Gurkha Camp in Pokhara is the main recruitment centre, where the annual selection course is run. Pokhara is also the location of the main pension records and houses the headquarters of the Gurkha Welfare Trust.
Dharan Station	British Gurkhas Nepal	Nepal			A small station intended to assist British Gurkhas Nepal operations in eastern Nepal. It is used primarily as a movement base and regional recruiting centre.

=== Oman ===
Name	Part of	Country	County	Opened	Description
UK Joint Logistics Support Base	Al Duqm Port & Drydock	Oman	Duqm	2018	A joint logistical support facility within the Al Duqm Port & Drydock. In September 2020, an investment was made to expand the facility's training infrastructure for the British Army.
Omani-British Joint Training Area		Oman	Duqm		A joint training area announced in 2019 as part of a Joint Defence Agreement (JDA).

=== Kenya ===
The British Army presence in Kenya is based around the British Army Training Unit Kenya (BATUK).

Name	Part of	Country	County	Opened	Units
Archer's Post Training Area	British Army Training Unit Kenya	Kenya	Samburu County		A large 250,000 hectares military training area, which facilitates Live Fire Tactical Training, including artillery, mortars and vehicles.
Dol Dol Training Area	British Army Training Unit Kenya	Kenya	Laikipia County		
Nyati Barracks	British Army Training Unit Kenya	Kenya	Laikipia County	2020	Training headquarters, welfare facilities, 158 Single Living Accommodation and 1,400 transit accommodation bed spaces, a combined mess, a finance building, offices, stores and Joint Forces Enabling Exercise buildings.
Kahawa Barracks	British Army Training Unit Kenya	Kenya	Nairobi		BATUK rear area base and depot.
Kifaru Barracks	British Army Training Unit Kenya	Kenya	Nairobi		BATUK rear area base and depot.
International Mine Action Training Centre	The British Peace Support Team East Africa	Kenya	Nairobi County	2005	The IMATC is a joint British and Kenyan venture aimed at alleviating the suffering caused by landmines and explosive remnants of war, by providing high quality Mine Action Training
Peace Training Support Centre	The British Peace Support Team East Africa	Kenya	Nairobi County	2005	

=== Kosovo ===
Name	City	Country	Opened	Notes & Units
Camp Bondsteel	Prishtina	Kosovo	Occupied by British Army since 1999	As part of NATO-led peacekeeping Kosovo Force (KFOR)

=== Saudi Arabia ===
Name	Country	City	Opened	Notes & Units
British Military Mission to the Saudi Arabian National Guard (BMM SANG)	Saudi Arabia	Riyadh	1964	Small number of senior British Army officers, as well as up to 20 training teams per year, that provide training to the Saudi Arabian National Guard (SANG), which is tasked with protecting the ruling House of Saud from internal threats such as a coup d'état.

=== Sierra Leone ===
Name	Garrison	Country	County	Opened	Notes & Units
IMATT HQ, Leicester Peak	IMATT (International Military Advisory and Training Team)	Sierra Leone	Freetown	1999	Facility for training the Republic of Sierra Leone Armed Forces IMATT has a team of international staff based in Sierra Leone where they provide the government with security and military advice and training, playing an important role in supporting the country's climb from the chaos of civil war.

== See also ==
- List of airfields of the Army Air Corps
- List of Royal Air Force stations
- List of Royal Navy shore establishments
- List of Royal Marines establishments
- British Forces Cyprus
- British Forces South Atlantic Islands
- British Forces Gibraltar
