= Initial Training Group =

Initial Training Group (ITG)
- Country: United Kingdom
- Branch: British Army
- Part of: Army Recruiting and Initial Training Command
- Motto(s): Trust, Courage, Team Spirit

The Initial Training Group of the British Army is responsible for the content and delivery of non-infantry Phase 1 training. The group's headquarters are at Pirbright, Surrey, commanding 4 Army Training Regiments, 5 Army Training Units, the Army Foundation College in Harrogate, the Army School of Physical Training, and the ARITC Staff Leadership School. It is part of the Army Recruiting and Training Command, who are responsible for all recruiting and training prior to becoming a fully qualified soldier or officer.

The headquarters is commanded by a Brigadier, supported by a number of military and civilian staff.

== Units ==
ITG is responsible for the Army Training Regiments (ATRs), which provide Phase 1 Training for the majority of the regiments and corps in the British Army.

- Army Foundation College Harrogate – for soldiers aged between 16 and 17½
- Army Training Regiment Winchester
- Army Training Centre Pirbright
- Army Training Regiment Grantham
- Army School of Physical Training

== See also ==
- Infantry Training Centre, Catterick
