= Training of the Army Reserve (United Kingdom) =

- Country: United Kingdom
- Branch: British Army
- Role: Training
- Part of: Army Recruiting and Initial Training Command (ARITC)

British Army Reserve Training Locations include four Army Training Unit (ATU) sites and two other locations where the Army Reserve Phase One Training courses are delivered.

Reserve recruits are first selected at an Army Assessment Centre, before progressing onto Phase One Basic Training.

== History ==
Army Training Units (ATUs) were originally created as Regional Training Centres (RTC) - which were in turn created from Brigade Specialist Training Teams (STT) - to provide basic training and specialist courses for the British Army Reserve (formerly the Territorial Army). They were originally commanded and administered by their local Regional Forces (RF) Brigade.

From 2012, they were renamed Army Training Units and command of the ATUs passed to Initial Training Group (ITG), formerly part of the Army Recruiting and Training Division (ARTD), now part of Army Recruiting and Initial Training Command (ARITC). Initial Training Group (ITG) is responsible for all British Army Phase One Basic Training, both Regular and Reserve, except Regular Standard Entry Infantry, of which Infantry Training Centre are responsible.

== Locations ==
=== Army Training Units (ATU) ===
- ATU North – Queen Elizabeth Barracks, North Yorkshire with detachment at Altcar Training Camp, Merseyside

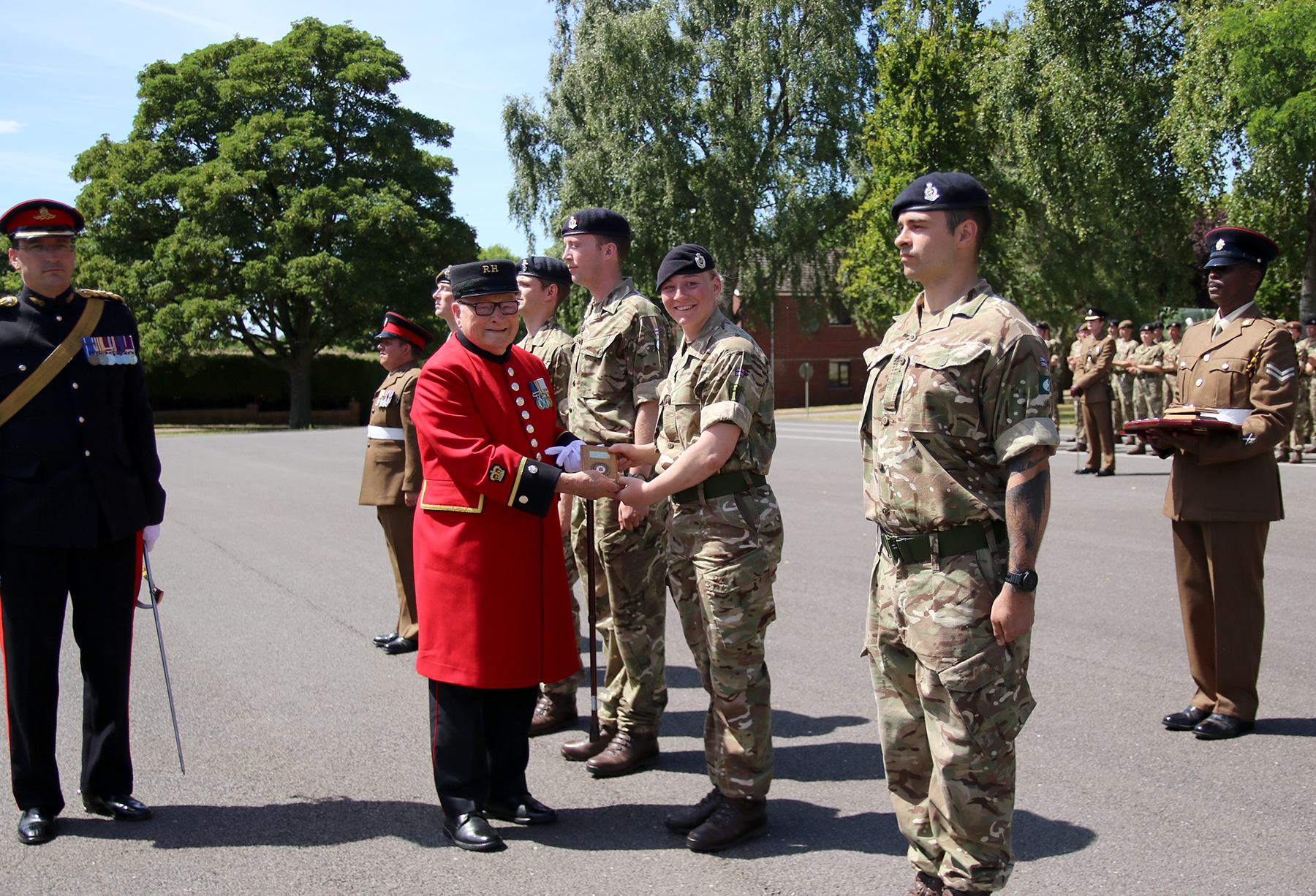
Army Reservists marking the end of their basic training with a Pass Out Parade at ATR Grantham.

- ATU Scotland – Redford Barracks, Edinburgh
- ATU Northern Ireland – Ballykinler Training Camp
- ATU West – Wyvern Barracks, Exeter with detachment at Maindy Barracks, Cardiff

=== Reserves Phase One Training courses are also delivered by ===
- Army Training Regiment Grantham (ATR G) located at Prince William of Gloucester Barracks, Grantham - scheduled to close by 2028
- Army Training Centre Pirbright (ATC P) located at Alexander Barracks, Pirbright

Under Future Soldier, a new British Army Soldier Academy will be established in Pirbright. The sites at Winchester and Grantham will be closed.

== Syllabus ==
ATR Grantham and the Army Training Units (ATUs) are the British Army's primary locations for providing the Army Reserve Phase One Foundation Weekend, which is designed to introduce recruits to basic military skills and life.

Reserve Recruits then complete the Module 2 course of four residential training weekends over an 8-week period at their closest Army Training Unit (ATU). ATUs are staffed by Army Reserve Instructors. Alternatively, Army Reserve recruits can complete this part of the training in a single 7-day consolidated period, which is delivered at ATR Grantham by Regular Army Instructors.

During Mod 2, Army Training Units primarily teach recruits their Weapon Handling Test (WHT), live firing and Annual Combat Marksmanship Test (ACMT), practical map and compass navigation, battlefield casualty drills and casualty evacuation, further drill instruction as well as a night in the field conducting non-tactical fieldcraft training, mental resilience and physical training sessions; including TABs (Tactical Advance to Battle), also known as Loaded Marches.

Following completion of Mod 2 comes the 15.5-day residential Module 3 'Battle Camp', which is held primarily at ATR Grantham, in which recruits are trained and assessed according to the Common Military Syllabus (Reserve) and Mandatory Annual Training Tests (MATTs) by Regular Army permanent staff. Recruits will also deploy into the field on two Field Training Exercises during this phase.

In between Mod 2 and Mod 3, recruits are expected to complete Distance Learning in a variety of subjects on the Defence Gateway, and the Physical Development Pathway.

Recruits will then attend Phase Two Trade Training courses as stipulated by their cap badge / role, and if joining the 4th Battalion, Parachute Regiment, or other Reserve Airborne Units such as 299 Para Sqn, attend Pre-Parachute Selection and pass P Company Test Week.

The Honourable Artillery Company currently runs its own HAC Recruits' Course. The Recruit's Course lasts six months which consists of Tuesday evenings, approximately one weekend a month and a ten-day final exercise.

Recruits applying to join the two Reserve SAS regiments (21 SAS and 23 SAS) are sponsored out to a local Army Reserve unit to complete Phase One Training, and then the Combat Infantry Course, before attempting SAS Reserves selection.

== See also ==
- Army Training Regiment
- Selection and training in the British Army
