= Selection and training in the British Army =

Selection and training in the British Army is the process by which candidates for service are identified, inducted and brought onto the trained strength. The process is the responsibility of the Home Command.

== Selection ==
Candidates for all three of the British Armed Forces are first handled through Armed Forces Career Offices, which are located in major conurbations around the United Kingdom supporting the respective recruitment functions. Candidates for enlistment may be aged between 15 years, 7 months (for enlistment from age 16) and 32. Candidates for officer entry may be aged between 18 and 29.

== Regular Army training ==
Candidates for the Army undergo common training, beginning with initial military training, to bring all personnel to a similar standard in basic military skills, and further specialist training is delivered according to the Regiment or Corps for which the individual has been identified as a candidate. Completion of Initial Trade Training (ITT) brings the individual onto the trained strength; however, each of the British Armed Forces will continue to deliver specialist and generalist training throughout the individual's career.

Much training in the British Armed Forces has been accredited by various awarding bodies, resulting in the opportunity to gain civilian qualifications through service training activities.

=== Basic Training (BT) ===
Basic Training, which is often referred to as Phase 1 training, follows a standard syllabus for all new recruits. For other ranks, this is the Common Military Syllabus (Recruits) (CMSR). CMSR covers the skills and fitness needed to survive and operate in a field environment, and seeks to imbue the ethos and principles of the British Army. The trainee is required to demonstrate competence in thirteen training objectives over the fourteen-week course. Officers undertake the Commissioning Course, which covers the basic aspects of soldiering as well as command, leadership and management. The standard course for new Direct Entry Officers lasts 44 weeks. Professionally qualified officers (those that have joined the army having already gained a professional qualification, such as doctors, lawyers or chaplains) undergo a shorter, ten-week course. The Late Entry Officers Course is a four-week course for already serving soldiers that have been chosen for commissioning as officers.

There are five training establishments for Basic Training in the Regular Army:

Title	Name	Course length	Attendees
Officers
Royal Military Academy Sandhurst	Sandhurst	44 wk	All Arms Direct Entry Officers
Royal Military Academy Sandhurst	Sandhurst	10 wk	Professionally Qualified Officers
Royal Military Academy Sandhurst	Sandhurst	4 wk	Late Entry Officers
Other Ranks
Army Foundation College	Harrogate	49 wk	(ages 16–17½): Royal Armoured Corps/Household Cavalry; Royal Artillery; Infantry; Parachute Regiment; some Royal Logistic Corps roles
Army Foundation College	Harrogate	23 wk	(ages 16–17½) for those joining courses with longer Initial Trade Training – these are: Royal Electrical and Mechanical Engineers; Royal Engineers; Royal Signals; Adjutant General's Corps; Royal Army Medical Service; Army Air Corps; and some Royal Logistic Corps roles
Army Training Centre	Pirbright	14 wk	Corps of Royal Electrical and Mechanical Engineers; Army Air Corps; Royal Regiment of Artillery; Royal Corps of Signals; Royal Logistic Corps; Adjutant General's Corps; Royal Army Medical Service; Intelligence Corps; Royal Corps of Army Music
Army Training Regiment	Winchester	14 wk	Royal Armoured Corps; Army Air Corps; Royal Regiment of Artillery; Corps of Royal Engineers; Royal Corps of Signals; Royal Logistic Corps; Adjutant General's Corps; Royal Army Medical Service; Intelligence Corps
Infantry Training Centre	Catterick		
Infantry Training Centre	Catterick	36 wk	Brigade of Gurkhas
Infantry Training Centre	Catterick	30 wk	Parachute Regiment; Foot Guards
Infantry Training Centre	Catterick	26 wk	Infantry Regiments

Basic Training is intended to bring all recruits to a base level of military competency, capable of operating in the field, providing force protection, operational security and displaying the other characteristics of a member of the British Army. For officers, this also includes the professional competencies required for command. During this period, recruits pass in and receive their regimental berets; they then pass out and continue to Initial Trade Training to undergo job training. The training embeds the core values:

- Courage
- Discipline
- Respect for others
- Integrity
- Loyalty
- Selfless commitment

=== Initial Trade Training (ITT) ===
The Initial Trade Training involves the new officer or soldier training for the branch of the service they wish to specialise in, and then undergoing specific training, now called Subsequent Trade Training (STT). This is with one of the specialist schools located around the country:

Name	Location	Arm
Armour Centre	Bovington Camp	Royal Armoured Corps; Household Cavalry
Royal School of Artillery	Larkhill	Royal Artillery
Army Aviation Centre	Middle Wallop	Army Air Corps
Royal School of Military Engineering	Chatham	Royal Engineers
Royal School of Military Engineering	Minley	Royal Engineers
Royal School of Signals	Blandford Camp	Royal Corps of Signals
Infantry Training Centre	Catterick	Infantry
Infantry Battle School	Brecon	Infantry
Defence School of Electronic and Mechanical Engineering	Lyneham	Royal Electrical and Mechanical Engineers
Defence School of Transport	Leconfield	Royal Logistic Corps
Defence Medical Academy	Whittington Barracks	Royal Army Medical Service
Defence School of Healthcare Education	Birmingham City University; Queen Elizabeth Hospital Birmingham	Royal Army Medical Service
Defence Animal Training Regiment	Melton Mowbray	Royal Army Veterinary Corps
Defence School of Personnel Administration	Worthy Down Camp	Staff and Personnel Support
Defence School of Policing and Guarding	Southwick Park	Royal Military Police
Royal Military School of Music	HMNB Portsmouth	Royal Corps of Army Music
Joint Intelligence Training Group	Chicksands	Intelligence Corps

== Army Reserve training ==
=== Soldiers ===
For Army Reserve soldiers, recruit training is in two parts: Basic Training (BT), also known as the Common Military Syllabus (Reserve) (CMS(R)) Course, and Initial Trade Training (ITT), special-to-arm training.

Basic Training

ATR Grantham and the Army Training Units (ATUs) are the British Army's primary locations for providing the Army Reserve Phase One 'Foundation Weekend', which is designed to introduce recruits to basic military skills and life.

Reserve Recruits then complete the Mod 2 course of four training weekends over an 8-week period at their closest Army Training Unit (ATU). ATUs are staffed by Army Reserve Instructors. Alternatively, Army Reserve recruits can complete this part of the training in a single 7-day consolidated period, which is delivered at ATR Grantham by Regular Army Instructors.

Following completion of Mod 2 comes the 15.5-day residential Mod 3, which is held primarily at ATR Grantham, in which recruits are trained and assessed by Regular Army permanent staff. Recruits will also deploy into the field on two Field Training Exercises during this phase.

In between Mod 2 and Mod 3, recruits are expected to complete Distance Learning in a variety of subjects on the Defence Gateway, and the Physical Development Pathway.

Initial Trade Training (ITT)

ITT is a further period of special-to-arm training specific to the type of unit the recruit is joining. This is normally conducted by the Arm or Service that the recruit is joining, for example for infantry units, ITT consists of the two-week Combat Infantry Course (Reserve) (CIC (Res)) held at the Infantry Training Centre, Catterick.

=== Officers ===
To gain a commission, potential officers have to pass through four modules of training, which together form the Army Reserve Commissioning Course.

Module A consists of basic field training and elementary military skills. This can be completed at either a University Officers Training Unit (UOTC) over a number of weekends, or over two weeks at the Royal Military Academy Sandhurst (RMAS).

Module B covers training in Tactics, Leadership, Doctrine and Navigation, both in theory and in practice, with a focus on the section battle drills and the platoon combat estimate. This training can either be spread over ten weekends at a UOTC, or two weeks at the RMAS.

Module C builds on the Tactics, Leadership, Doctrine and Navigation taught in Module B, with a greater focus on the theory behind these constructs. CBRN training is also added at this point, and Officer Cadets undergo a number of field exercises to test their military and leadership skills. Module C can only be undertaken at the RMAS.

Module D: once the Officer Cadet has completed their Army Officer Selection Board, they can complete this final module, after which they will become commissioned officers in the British Army. Based at the RMAS, this module consists primarily of a prolonged field exercise, followed by drill training in preparation for the passing out parade.

On successful completion of Module D, the Officer Cadets receive their Commission and become Second Lieutenants. Further training that is required prior to them being considered for operational deployment and promotion to Lieutenant includes:

Post Commissioning Training (formerly known as Module 5), again run at an OTC, over three weekends.

Special To Arm training is specific to the type of unit the subaltern is joining, and covers a two-week period. This is increasingly integrated with the tactics phase of a Regular training course. Examples are the Platoon Commander's Battle Course held at the Infantry Battle School in Brecon, which is integrated with Regular training, or the Yeomanry Tactics Course held at the Land Warfare Centre in Warminster, which is not.
