= Army training regiment (United Kingdom) =

Unit providing basic training for the British Army

- Country: United Kingdom
- Branch: British Army
- Type: Training
- Part of: Army Recruiting and Initial Training Command

An army training regiment (ATR) provides Basic Phase 1 Training for all elements of the British Army, except the infantry. There are currently four army training regiments.

== Regiments and sub-units ==
- 1st Army Training Regiment (1 ATR) located at Army Training Centre Pirbright (ATC P).
  - Jackson Company, Adjutant General's Corps
  - 59 (Asten) Battery, Royal Artillery
  - 96 (Duke of Gloucester) Squadron, Royal Logistic Corps
  - Chavasse Company, Royal Army Medical Service
- 2nd Army Training Regiment (2 ATR) located at Army Training Centre Pirbright (ATC P).
  - Wilson Company
  - Caen Squadron, Royal Armoured Corps
  - D Company (training Army Reservists)
  - 28 Squadron, Royal Engineers
  - 108 (Princess Royal's) Squadron, Royal Logistic Corps
- Army Training Regiment Winchester (ATR W) located at Sir John Moore Barracks, Winchester.
- Army Training Regiment Grantham (ATR G) located at Prince William of Gloucester Barracks, Grantham provides training for all Army Reserve recruits.

Under Future Soldier, a new British Army Soldier Academy will be established in Pirbright. The sites at Winchester and Grantham will be closed.

The British Army also used to have army training regiments at;

- Bassingbourn (closed in 2012),
- Harrogate (renamed the Army Foundation College),
- Lichfield (closed in 2008).

== Syllabus ==
Army training regiments deliver a 14-week training course (which teaches all aspects of the Common Military Syllabus) that is completed by all adult (age 17+) recruits when they join the Regular Army.

Recruits are taught and tested on a variety of military subjects, including;

- Weapon handling, marksmanship principals and live firing with the L85A3 rifle, and how to strip, clean and maintain it.
- Physical training that involves running, circuit training, battle PT, swimming, loaded marching, assault course, calisthenics and more.
- Battlefield casualty drills including triage and stabilisiation of casualties, treatment of gunshot wounds, catastrophic bleeds, loss of limb, breathing difficulties, bone breaks, burns, shock, evacuation procedures and more.
- Field craft including constructing a shelter and erecting a 'basha', animal traps, cooking, filtering and disinfecting water, personal hygiene
- Chemical, biological, radiological and nuclear defense (CBRN defence) drills, including the rapid donning of CBRN suit and respirator (gas mask), decontaminating themselves and their equipment, administering first aid for poisoning, and testing the environment for agents. A key part of this training involves recruits entering a room filled with tear gas, removing their respirator, and attempting to shout their name, rank, number, and the regiment/corps they are aspiring to join, before the effects of the tear gas (coughing, sneezing, eyes burning, shortness of breath) become too much to handle.
- Field exercises where recruits are taught vital military knowledge such as patrolling discipline and formations, section/platoon attacks, room clearance drills, ambushes, searching enemy/civilian prisoners and vehicles, the 6 section battle drills; "Prep for battle, react to enemy fire, locate the enemy, suppress the enemy, attack the enemy, re-group", how to locate the enemy and accurately communicate the enemy's distance and location/target indication via methods such as direct method, clock ray method, bracketing etc, why things are seen and the "7 S's of camoflauge"; Shape, Speed, Skyline, Shadow, Silhouette, Spacing, Shine, Sound, defense of FOBs and 'harbour areas' and static and dynamic sentry, standing guard or "stag", river and obstacle crossing, hand signals, and radio communication voice procedure.
- Navigation and map reading including navigating at night and in dense forest, using only a map and compass.
- Courage, discipline, respect for others, integrity, loyalty, and selfless commitment (CDRILS) are the Army's Values & Standards and are taught and discussed in presentations and practical scenarios.
- The Law of Armed Conflict and Geneva Conventions.
- A "Realities of War" trip.
- Bayonet fighting and hand to hand combat.
- Foot drill and rifle drill.
- Grenade drills.

== See also ==
- Army Training Unit
- Selection and training in the British Army
