= Sir John Moore Barracks =

Sir John Moore Barracks may refer to:

- Sir John Moore Barracks, Shorncliffe at Shorncliffe Army Camp (1890-present)
- Sir John Moore Barracks, Shrewsbury (1960 to 1986; known as Copthorne Barracks prior to 1960 and reverted to Copthorne Barracks in 1986)
- Sir John Moore Barracks, Winchester (1986 to present)
