= Army Training Centre Pirbright =

Coordinates: 51.3037°N 0.6636°W

- Active: 1993–present
- Country: United Kingdom
- Branch: British Army
- Type: Basic training
- Size: 2 regiments
- Part of: Initial Training Group
- Motto: Bello te Prepares
- Website: ATC Pirbright

The Army Training Centre Pirbright is an initial training establishment of the British Army, at Pirbright Camp.

== Scope ==
The ATC, along with the Army Training Regiment Winchester and the Army Training Regiment Grantham, provides Phase 1 military training for all recruits over the age of 18, who are joining the Army Air Corps, the Royal Regiment of Artillery, Royal Corps of Signals, the Royal Logistic Corps, the Adjutant General's Corps, the Royal Army Medical Service, the Royal Engineers, the Royal Armoured Corps, the Royal Corps of Army Music and the Intelligence Corps.

== Organisation ==
The centre is organized into three regiments as follows;

- Centre Headquarters
- Headquarters Regiment
- 1st Army Training Regiment (Pirbright)
  - Jackson Company, Adjutant General's Corps
  - 59 (Asten) Battery, Royal Artillery
  - 96 (Duke of Gloucester) Squadron, Royal Logistic Corps
  - Chavasse Company, Royal Army Medical Service
- 2nd Army Training Regiment (Pirbright)
  - Wilson Company
  - Caen Squadron, Royal Armoured Corps (administered by the RAC training regiment)
  - D Company (training Army Reservists)
  - 28 Squadron, Royal Engineers
  - 108 (Princess Royal's) Squadron, Royal Logistic Corps

== In media ==
Pirbright was the filming location for British Army Girls, a three-part television documentary first shown on Channel 4 in April 2016.
