= Infantry of the British Army =

Combat arm of the British Army

The Infantry
- Active: 1991–present
- Country: United Kingdom
- Branch: British Army
- Part of: Land Warfare Centre
- Headquarters Infantry: Waterloo Lines, Warminster Garrison

Commanders
- Colonel Commandant: Lt-Gen Ian Cave, CB

The Infantry of the British Army comprises 49 infantry battalions, from 19 regiments. Of these, 32 battalions are part of the Regular army and the remaining 16 a part of the Army Reserve. The British Army's Infantry takes on a variety of roles, including armoured, mechanised, air assault and light.

== Recruitment and training ==
=== Recruitment ===
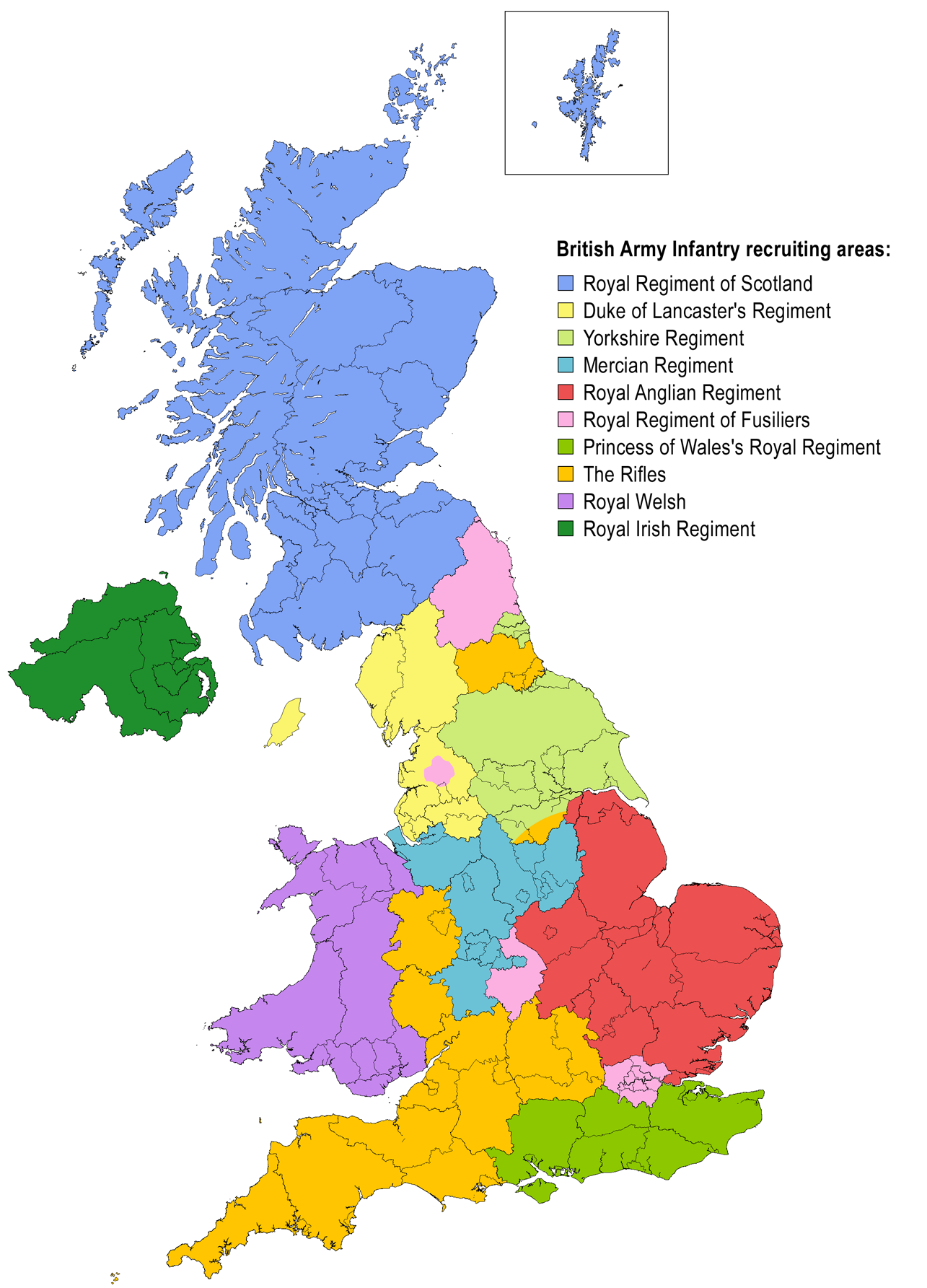
Recruiting areas of British line infantry regiments

Traditionally, regiments that form the combat arms of the British Army (cavalry and infantry) recruit from specific areas of the country. Infantry regiments were assigned specific areas from which they would recruit from by the mid-eighteenth century. These were formalised under the Cardwell Reforms that began in the 1860s. Under this scheme, single-battalion infantry regiments were amalgamated into two-battalion regiments, then assigned to a depot and associated recruiting area (which would usually correspond to all or part of a county). The recruiting area (usually) would then become part of the regiment's title. It was this that gave rise to the concept of the "county regiment", with the local infantry regiment becoming part of the fabric of its local area.

Regiments have since been amalgamated further, which has led to recruiting areas of individual regiments increasing in size. Often, these amalgamations have been between regiments whose recruiting areas border each other. There have been occasions where regiments of a similar type, but from widely different areas, have been amalgamated. Two modern examples have been the Royal Regiment of Fusiliers (amalgamated from the county regiments of Northumberland, Warwickshire, City of London and Lancashire, all of which were regiments of fusiliers) and The Light Infantry (amalgamated from the county regiments of Cornwall, Somerset, Shropshire, South Yorkshire and Durham, all of which were regiments of light infantry).

Before the Second World War, infantry recruits were required to be at least 5 feet 2 inches (1.57 m) tall. They initially enlisted for seven years with the colours and a further five years with the reserve. They trained at their own regimental depot.

Since September 2007, when the most recent reforms were completed, the infantry has consisted of 18 separate regiments. The five regiments of foot guards recruit from their respective home nations (with the exception of the Coldstream Guards, which recruits from the counties through which the regiment marched between Coldstream and London). Scotland, Ireland and Wales each have a single regiment of line infantry from which they recruit (though the battalions of the Royal Regiment of Scotland recruit from the areas they recruited from when they were separate regiments), while England has seven line infantry and rifles regiments. The Parachute Regiment recruits nationally, while the Royal Gurkha Rifles recruits most of its serving personnel from Nepal, and the Royal Gibraltar Regiment recruits from the UK and Commonwealth nations

=== Training ===
Unlike the other trades in the army, which have separate units for basic training and specialised training, new recruits into the infantry undergo a single course at the Infantry Training Centre Catterick. This course, called the "Combat Infantryman's Course" (CIC), lasts 26 weeks as standard and teaches recruits both the basics of soldiering (Phase 1 training) and the specifics of soldiering in the infantry (Phase 2 training). On completion of the CIC, the newly qualified infantry soldier will then be posted to his battalion.

For some infantry units, the CIC is longer, due to specific additional requirements for individual regiments:

- The Foot Guards CIC has an additional two-week enhanced drill course.
- The Parachute Regiment CIC has an additional two-week Pre-Parachute Selection (PPS) course.
- The Brigade of Gurkhas CIC combines the Common Military Syllabus with the CIC, together with courses on British culture and the English Language. The Gurkha CIC lasts 37 weeks.

Officers receive their initial training at the Royal Military Academy Sandhurst, infantry officers then undertake the Platoon Commander's Battle Course, which is run at the Infantry Battle School at Brecon in Wales. It is here that leadership and tactics are taught to new platoon commanders. New NCOs and Warrant Officers are also sent on courses at Brecon when they come up for promotion. This encompasses Phase 3 training. Phase 3 training is also undertaken at the Support Weapons School at Warminster, where new officers, NCOs and soldiers are trained in the use of support weapons (mortars, anti-tank weapons) and in communications.

Reservist Infantrymen undertake preliminary training at Regional Training Centres prior to attending a two-week CIC (Reserve) at Catterick.

=== Headquarters Infantry ===
Headquarters Infantry, which is located at Waterloo Lines on Imber Road in Warminster, is responsible for recruiting, manning and training policy of the Infantry. Headquarters Infantry was established in 1991 as a result of the Options for Change reform.

== Divisions of infantry ==
The infantry in the British Army is divided for administrative purposes into divisions. These are not the same as the ready and regenerative divisions (see below), but are based on either the geographical recruiting areas of the regiments, or the type of regiments:

- The Guards and Parachute Division has the regiments of Foot Guards plus the Parachute Regiment.
- The Union Division has the infantry regiments from Scotland, Wales and Ireland, plus one from England.
- The Queen's Division has the regiments from England, as well as Gibraltar.
- The Light Division has the two remaining regiments of rifles, The Rifles and Gurkha Rifles.

Each division, in addition to the regiments under its administrative control, also hosts a battalion of The Rangers, the newly formed special operations unit.

The four existing divisions were formed as a result of the Future Soldier reforms announced in 2021; prior to this, only the Queen's Division of the new formations existed. The Guards Division, Scottish, Welsh and Irish Division and King's Division were the other three formations, while a number of other regiments sat outside the divisional structure.

Guards and Parachute Division	Union Division	Queen's Division	Light Division
Regular Army
Grenadier Guards: 1st Battalion; Nijmegen Company	The Royal Regiment of Scotland: 2nd Battalion; 3rd Battalion; 4th Battalion; Balaklava Company	The Princess of Wales's Royal Regiment (Queen's and Royal Hampshires): 1st Battalion	The Royal Gurkha Rifles: 1st Battalion; 2nd Battalion; Krithia Company; Coriano Company; Falklands Company
Coldstream Guards: 1st Battalion; No. 7 Company	The Royal Yorkshire Regiment (14th/15th, 19th and 33rd/76th Foot): 1st Battalion; 2nd Battalion	The Royal Regiment of Fusiliers: 1st Battalion	The Rifles: 1st Battalion; 2nd Battalion; 3rd Battalion; 5th Battalion
Scots Guards: 1st Battalion; F Company	The Royal Welsh: 1st Battalion	The Duke of Lancaster's Regiment (King's, Lancashire and Border): 1st Battalion	The Rangers: 4th Battalion
Irish Guards: 1st Battalion; No. 9 Company; No. 12 Company	The Royal Irish Regiment (27th (Inniskilling), 83rd, 87th and Ulster Defence Regiment): 1st Battalion	The Mercian Regiment (Cheshires, Worcesters and Foresters, and Staffords): 1st Battalion	
Welsh Guards: 1st Battalion	The Rangers: 2nd Battalion	The Royal Anglian Regiment: 1st Battalion; 2nd Battalion	
The Parachute Regiment: 1st Battalion; 2nd Battalion; 3rd Battalion		The Rangers: 3rd Battalion	
The Rangers: 1st Battalion			
Army Reserve
London Guards (Note: The London Guards administers the reserve companies of the Grenadier Guards, Coldstream Guards, Scots Guards and Irish Guards.): 1st Battalion	The Royal Regiment of Scotland: 6th Battalion; 7th Battalion	The Princess of Wales's Royal Regiment (Queen's and Royal Hampshires): 3rd Battalion; 4th Battalion	The Rifles: 6th Battalion; 7th Battalion; 8th Battalion
The Parachute Regiment: 4th Battalion	The Royal Yorkshire Regiment (14th/15th, 19th and 33rd/76th Foot): 4th Battalion	The Royal Regiment of Fusiliers: 5th Battalion	
	The Royal Welsh: 3rd Battalion	The Duke of Lancaster's Regiment (King's, Lancashire and Border): 4th Battalion	
	The Royal Irish Regiment (27th (Inniskilling), 83rd, 87th and Ulster Defence Regiment): 2nd Battalion	The Mercian Regiment (Cheshires, Worcesters and Foresters, and Staffords): 4th Battalion	
		The Royal Anglian Regiment: 3rd Battalion	
Colonial and Crown Dominion units
		The Royal Gibraltar Regiment	

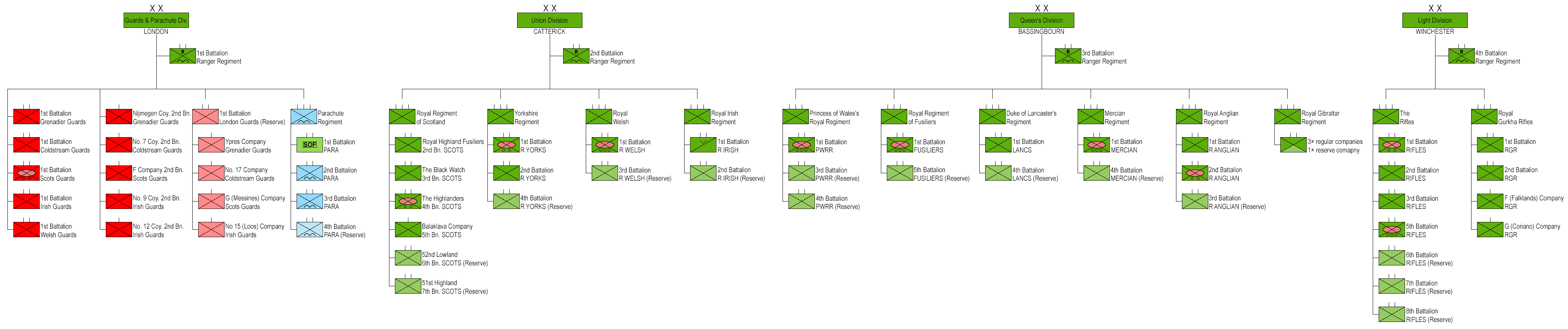
British Army Infantry administrative organization 2025 (click to enlarge)

== Types of infantry ==
=== Operations ===
Within the British Army, there are six main types of infantry:

- Armoured Infantry – armoured infantry are equipped with the Warrior Infantry Fighting Vehicle, a tracked vehicle that can deploy over all terrain.
- Mechanised Infantry – mechanised infantry (or "protected mobility infantry) are equipped with wheeled armoured vehicles for transporting troops. This is divided into "heavy protected mobility infantry" (with large vehicles such as Mastiff), and "light protected mobility infantry" (with smaller vehicles such as Foxhound).
- Light Infantry – light infantry are not equipped with armoured vehicles; such units may specialise in jungle and/or arctic warfare
- Air Assault Infantry – air assault infantry are trained to be deployed using helicopters, parachute or aircraft.
- Specialised Infantry – infantry configured to undertake training, mentoring and assistance to indigenous forces in partner nations.
- Public duties – infantry on public duties are essentially light infantry units undertaking primarily ceremonial tasks.

=== Traditions ===
The infantry is traditionally divided into three types:

- Foot Guards – foot guards are those infantry regiments that were formed specifically to provide close guard to the monarch. Soldiers in the guards were usually the best trained and equipped members of the infantry. However, they would fight in the same way as ordinary regiments.
- Line Infantry – line infantry refers to those regiments that historically fought in linear formations, unlike light troops, who fought in loose order. The seventeenth and eighteenth centuries saw expansion of the roles of the infantry. To this end, the companies stationed on each flank of an infantry battalion were specialist units, with a company of light infantry trained as skirmishers to operate independently on the battlefield, and a company of grenadiers, who were usually the biggest and strongest men in the battalion, operating as the lead assault troops. In later years, the British Army raised full line infantry regiments classed as light infantry, who operated with muskets alongside specialised regiments armed with rifles.
- Rifles – in the late eighteenth century, the development of the Baker rifle led to the commissioning by the British Army of regiments specially trained to use the new weapon. These regiments would operate as skirmishers and sharpshooters on the edges of the field of battle. These regiments wore green rather than red tunics to enable them to blend in more with the environment, thus giving them the nickname "green jackets".

The tactical distinctions between infantry regiments disappeared in the late nineteenth century, but remain in tradition. In the order of precedence, the five regiments of foot guards are ranked above the ten regiments of traditional line infantry, who are ranked above the two remaining regiments of rifles.

== Divisions and brigades ==
Under the Future Soldier reforms announced in 2021, the British Army will have a total of 31 regular infantry battalions, 16 reserve infantry battalions and nine independent companies performing a variety of tasks. Under the Future Soldier plan, postings are:

=== 1st (United Kingdom) Division ===
1st (UK) Division is planned as the UK's primary land element for operations outside the European theatre, as well as operations supporting NATO's flanks. It consists of four infantry centred brigades – one is intended as a high-readiness mobile formation, one as a light infantry formation to provide surge capacity, and one as a parent formation for Army Reserve battalions. The other, 16 Air Assault Brigade, forms part of the overall "Reaction Force", and is a lead element of the UK's rapid reaction strategy. The other major independent element of the Reaction Force is UK Commando Force (UKCF); although this does have British Army units attached in combat support roles, the infantry units are from the Royal Marines, which is part of the Naval Service. (Note: The Royal Marines has four battalion-sized units dedicated to the commando infantry role – 40 Commando, 42 Commando and 45 Commando are the warfighting elements of UKCF, while 43 Commando is tasked with providing security for the UK's nuclear deterrent, as well as supplying marines for maritime security tasks on Royal Navy ships)

- 4th Light Brigade Combat Team
  - 1st Battalion, Grenadier Guards (Light Infantry) (Note: Foot guards units provide personnel to London District public duties teams) (Note: Light infantry, specialised infantry and public duties foot guards battalions will periodically rotate roles. The foot guards battalion assigned to the Security Assistance Brigade will provide two incremental companies for public duties for the duration of its time in the brigade.) (Note: Light infantry and mechanised infantry battalions will periodically rotate to serve as resident battalions as part of British Forces Cyprus.)
  - 1st Battalion, Welsh Guards (Light Infantry)
  - The Royal Highland Fusiliers, 2nd Battalion, The Royal Regiment of Scotland (Light Infantry)
  - 1st Battalion, The Duke of Lancaster's Regiment (King's, Lancashire and Border) (Light Infantry)
  - 1st Battalion, The Royal Gurkha Rifles (Light Infantry) (Note: Royal Gurkha Rifles battalions rotate postings to Brunei every three years. The Brunei based battalion forms the core of British Forces Brunei as jungle trained light infantry, but is subordinated to 4 Bde. The UK based battalion is attached to 16 Bde as air assault infantry.)
  - 2nd Battalion, The Rifles (Light Infantry)
- 7th Light Mechanised Brigade Combat Team
  - 1st Battalion, Scots Guards (Light Mechanised Infantry)
  - The Highlanders, 4th Battalion, The Royal Regiment of Scotland (Light Mechanised Infantry)
  - 2nd Battalion, The Royal Anglian Regiment (Light Mechanised Infantry)
  - 1st Battalion, The Royal Yorkshire Regiment (14th/15th, 19th and 33rd/76th Foot) (Light Mechanised Infantry)
  - 1st Battalion, The Rifles (Light Mechanised Infantry)
- 16th Air Assault Brigade Combat Team
  - 2nd Battalion, The Parachute Regiment (Parachute Infantry)
  - 3rd Battalion, The Parachute Regiment (Parachute Infantry)
  - 1st Battalion, The Royal Irish Regiment (27th (Inniskilling), 83rd, 87th and Ulster Defence Regiment) (Air Assault Infantry)
  - 2nd Battalion, The Royal Gurkha Rifles (Air Assault Infantry)
  - 4th Battalion, The Parachute Regiment (Army Reserve) (Note: Army reserve battalions are 'paired' with regular battalions)
- 19th Brigade
  - 52nd Lowland, 6th Battalion, The Royal Regiment of Scotland (Army Reserve)
  - 51st Highland, 7th Battalion, The Royal Regiment of Scotland (Army Reserve)
  - 4th Battalion, The Duke of Lancaster's Regiment (King's, Lancashire and Border) (Army Reserve)
  - 3rd Battalion, The Royal Anglian Regiment (Army Reserve)
  - 4th Battalion, The Royal Yorkshire Regiment (14th/15th, 19th and 33rd/76th Foot) (Army Reserve)
  - 2nd Battalion, The Royal Irish Regiment (27th (Inniskilling), 83rd, 87th and Ulster Defence Regiment) (Army Reserve)
  - 6th Battalion, The Rifles (Army Reserve)
  - 8th Battalion, The Rifles (Army Reserve)

=== 3rd (United Kingdom) Division ===
3rd (UK) Division is planned as the UK's main reaction force, intended to act as a lead formation alongside NATO, and primarily consists of a pair of armoured brigades containing the army's mechanised infantry units.

- 12th Armoured Brigade Combat Team
  - 1st Battalion, The Mercian Regiment (Cheshire, Worcesters & Foresters, and Staffords) (Armoured Infantry)
  - 1st Battalion, The Royal Welsh (Armoured Infantry)
  - 4th Battalion, The Mercian Regiment (Cheshire, Worcesters & Foresters, and Staffords) (Army Reserve)
  - 3rd Battalion, The Royal Welsh (Army Reserve)
- 20th Armoured Brigade Combat Team
  - 1st Battalion, The Princess of Wales's Royal Regiment (Queen's and Royal Hampshires) (Armoured Infantry)
  - 1st Battalion, The Royal Regiment of Fusiliers (Armoured Infantry)
  - 5th Battalion, The Rifles (Armoured Infantry)
  - 3rd Battalion, The Princess of Wales's Royal Regiment (Queen's and Royal Hampshires) (Army Reserve)
  - 5th Battalion, The Royal Regiment of Fusiliers (Army Reserve)
  - 7th Battalion, The Rifles (Army Reserve)

=== Field Army Troops ===
Field Army Troops is the formation encompassing specialist elements of the Field Army. The formation has responsibility for a single infantry brigade, which operates in what is referred to as the "near surface operations" role, with infantry operating alongside drones. Additionally, it has responsibility for the Land Special Operations Force, which contains infantry battalions operating in the special operations warfare role.. The formation also has responsibility for the Land Warfare Centre, an organisation that administers a number of the Army's training centres, which includes an additional training company.

- 11th Brigade
  - 1st Battalion, Irish Guards (Near Surface Operations Infantry) (Note: Near surface operations infantry are approximately half the size of other infantry battalions, and are intended to operate in the so-called "drone zone")
  - The Black Watch, 3rd Battalion, The Royal Regiment of Scotland (Near Surface Operations Infantry)
  - 2nd Battalion, The Royal Yorkshire Regiment (14th/15th, 19th and 33rd/76th Foot) (Near Surface Operations Infantry)
  - 1st Battalion, The Royal Anglian Regiment (Near Surface Operations Infantry)
  - 3rd Battalion, The Rifles (Near Surface Operations Infantry)
  - 4th Battalion, The Princess of Wales's Royal Regiment (Queen's and Royal Hampshires) (Army Reserve)
- Land Special Operations Force
  - 1st Battalion, The Rangers (Special Operations Infantry) (Note: Special operations infantry battalions are approximately half the size of other infantry battalions, and are used in high threat environments alongside the forces of partner nations)
  - 2nd Battalion, The Rangers (Special Operations Infantry)
  - 3rd Battalion, The Rangers (Special Operations Infantry)
  - 4th Battalion, The Rangers (Special Operations Infantry)
  - Krithia Company, The Royal Gurkha Rifles (Special Operations Infantry) (Note: Three independent companies of Gurkhas were formed as reinforcement units. These were originally to form a single specialised infantry battalion.)
  - Coriano Company, The Royal Gurkha Rifles (Special Operations Infantry)
  - Falklands Company, The Royal Gurkha Rifles (Special Operations Infantry)
- Land Warfare Centre
  - Gurkha Company (Tavoleto), The Royal Gurkha Rifles (Light Infantry) (Note: Company sized unit tasked with providing OPFOR at British Army training establishments)

=== Home Command ===
Infantry units are attached to a number of other formations that are independent of the British Army's three existing divisions. London District is responsible for the dedicated public duties units for London and Windsor. Two company sized units are used at the British Army's training establishments. A number of the United Kingdom's Overseas Territories maintain their own infantry units, which undertake a number of different roles in addition to internal security.

- UK Special Forces
  - 1st Battalion, The Parachute Regiment (Special Forces Light Infantry) (Note: 1 PARA forms the core component of the Special Forces Support Group, and, as such, is not available for operations as an ordinary infantry battalion)
- London District
  - 1st Battalion, Coldstream Guards (Public Duties)
  - Nijmegen Company, Grenadier Guards (Public Duties) (Note: Reinforced company sized unit for public duties)
  - No. 7 Company, Coldstream Guards (Public Duties)
  - F Company, Scots Guards (Public Duties)
  - No. 9 Company, Irish Guards (Public Duties)
  - No. 12 Company, Irish Guards (Public Duties)
  - 1st Battalion, London Guards (Army Reserve) (Note: 1 LONDONS (formerly the London Regiment) serves as the Guards Reserve Battalion; each of its four rifle companies is paired with a foot guards battalion.)
- 51st Infantry Brigade and Headquarters Scotland
  - Balaklava Company, 5th Battalion, The Royal Regiment of Scotland (Public Duties)
- Royal Military Academy Sandhurst
  - Gurkha Company (Sittang), The Royal Gurkha Rifles (Light Infantry)
- School of Infantry
  - Gurkha Wing (Mandalay), The Royal Gurkha Rifles (Light Infantry)
- British Forces Cyprus
  - Light Mechanised Infantry / Light Infantry battalion
  - Light Mechanised Infantry / Light Infantry battalion
- British Forces Brunei
  - Light Infantry battalion (Gurkha)
- British Forces Gibraltar
  - The Royal Gibraltar Regiment (Light Infantry) (Note: The Royal Gibraltar Regiment is a combined regular / reserve unit whose primary role is the territorial defence of Gibraltar – as such, it is not available for deployment as a whole battalion overseas, although it has provided individuals for a variety of operational taskings in a number of conflict zones)
- British Forces South Atlantic Islands
  - Roulement infantry company (Light Infantry) (Note: A light infantry company from 1 (UK) Division, 16 Air Assault Brigade or London District deploys for four months to serve as the resident infantry company)
  - The Falkland Islands Defence Force (Territorial Infantry) (Note: Overseas Territories maintain their own territorial infantry units tasked with internal security and disaster relief.)
- Other Overseas Territories
  - The Royal Bermuda Regiment (Territorial Infantry)
  - The Cayman Islands Regiment (Territorial Infantry)
  - The Turks and Caicos Islands Regiment (Territorial Infantry)
  - The Royal Montserrat Defence Force (Territorial Infantry)

== History ==
=== Brigade system, large regiments, disbandings and amalgamations ===
Following the end of the Second World War, reductions in the size of the infantry led to the amalgamation of the existing regimental depots, together with their operational battalions, into geographically based infantry depots, each designated by a letter of the alphabet from A to O (not including I). In 1948, upon the further reduction of line infantry and rifle regiments to a single battalion, the 14 infantry depots were renamed as geographical brigades (with the exception of Depot J, which was the brigade for those regiments designated as "light infantry", and Depot O, which was for the two regiments of rifles ). These brigades assumed the administrative functions from the individual regimental depots, essentially forming what amounted to a multi-battalion regiment. This was taken a stage further following the 1957 Defence White Paper, when each brigade adopted a single cap badge that would be worn by all of the regiments under its administration. This led to discussions within the government regarding the flexibility of the infantry under the then present regimental system, as well as the difficulty of potentially making reductions to the size of the army owing to the emotive nature of the amalgamation of regiments into single battalions. This led to the concept of the "large regiment", which would use the existing brigades as the basis of new, multi-battalion infantry regiments, amalgamating the existing single-battalion regiments en masse, with each of them becoming a battalion of the new formation. This process had to a certain degree begun in the East Anglian and Green Jackets Brigades, which had redesignated the regiments they were responsible for from their old names to numbered designations. These two became the first large regiments as the Royal Anglian Regiment and Royal Green Jackets in 1964 and 1966 respectively. Four further large regiments (The Queen's Regiment, Royal Regiment of Fusiliers, Royal Irish Rangers and Light Infantry) were formed between 1966 and 1968, before the process was halted – the brigade system was abolished, with instead all of the remaining infantry regiments grouped into six administrative divisions.

The amalgamations into large regiments coincided with a planned reduction in the size of the infantry – the intention was that the junior battalion of each large regiment or brigade (prior to the implementation of the divisional structure) would be removed, whether by amalgamation or disbanding. This saw plans for the creation of four new single battalion infantry regiments:

- Royal Regiment of Wales – South Wales Borderers and Welch Regiment
- Queen's Lancashire Regiment – Lancashire Regiment and Loyal Regiment (North Lancashire)
- Worcestershire and Sherwood Foresters Regiment (29th/45th Foot) – Worcestershire Regiment and Sherwood Foresters
- Royal Regiment of Gloucestershire and Hampshire – Gloucestershire Regiment and Royal Hampshire Regiment

At the same time, three more single battalion regiments elected to disband rather than amalgamate:

- The Cameronians (Scottish Rifles)
- York and Lancaster Regiment
- Argyll and Sutherland Highlanders (Princess Louise's)

Three of the regimental amalgamations, two of the regimental disbandments, plus another three of the planned disbandings of large regiment battalions, took place between 1968 and 1970. However, the 1970 General Election saw a change of administration, with the new Conservative government electing to review the plans. The outcome of this saw the planned amalgamation of the Gloucestershire Regiment and Royal Hampshire Regiment rescinded, together with plans to disband another four infantry battalions completely. Instead, six battalions were reduced in size to a single company:

- 2nd Battalion, Scots Guards (2nd Battalion Company)
- 1st Battalion, Royal Hampshire Regiment (Minden Company)
- 1st Battalion, Argyll and Sutherland Highlanders (Balaklava Company)
- 4th Battalion, Queen's Regiment (Albuhera Company)
- 4th Battalion, Royal Anglian Regiment (Tiger Company)
- 3rd Battalion, Royal Green Jackets (R Company)

The battalions of the Scots Guards, Royal Hampshire Regiment, Argyll and Sutherland Highlanders, and Royal Green Jackets were subsequently reconstituted.

=== Delivering Security in a Changing World (2003) ===
HM Treasury asked for major cuts in the strength of the infantry in 2003, with at least ten battalions to be disbanded. This proved so unacceptable that, in November 2003, there was consideration to instead reducing each battalion to two rifle companies (with the third to come from the TA). By March 2004, ECAB had shown that the maximum number of battalions it was possible to cut was four. This was finally officially announced as part of the army re-organisation. The arms plot system would be abolished; instead, individual battalions would be given fixed roles. To ensure that officers and men could continue to gain the variety of skills that the arms plot provided, the restructuring would also see a series of amalgamations of the remaining single battalion infantry regiments into large regiments. In addition, the regular army will lose four battalions. The roles are divided up as follows:

- Armoured Infantry – 8 battalions (including Land Warfare Training Battalion)
- Mechanised Infantry – 3 battalions
- Light Role Infantry (including public duties and Gurkhas) – 20 battalions
- Air Assault Infantry – 4 battalions
- Commando Infantry – 1 battalion
- Territorial Army Infantry – 14 battalions

The reorganisation was a hybrid of the systems used to organise the regular infantry in Australia and Canada. Australia's regular infantry encompasses eight battalions in a single large regiment, the Royal Australian Regiment – this system is the one undertaken by the Scottish Division and the Light Division. Canada's regular infantry has three regiments, each of three battalions, which is how the King's Division and the Prince of Wales' Division will be restructured (albeit with one regiment of three battalions and one of two battalions each).

In addition to the army's infantry battalions, there are three further battalion-sized commando infantry units, which are part of the Royal Marines, as well as eight field squadrons (each larger than an infantry company) of the RAF Regiment, who have responsibility for the ground defence of air assets and are under the control of the Royal Air Force.

The majority of infantry battalions are attached to one of the deployable brigades. However, there are a number of formations that exist to administer those infantry battalions that are not assigned to deployable brigades, but are instead available for independent deployment on roulement tours.

==== Guards Division ====
Each battalion in the five single battalion regiments of the Guards Division has a fixed role:

- Armoured Infantry (1 SG) – 1
- Light Role/Public Duties (1 GREN GDS, 1 COLDM GDS, 1 IG, 1 WG) – 4

Two battalions will be assigned as general light role battalions, with the other two assigned to public duties. These battalions will periodically rotate roles and postings.

==== Scottish Division ====
The six battalions of the Scottish Division have amalgamated into a single five battalion regiment to be called the Royal Regiment of Scotland.

- Armoured Infantry (4 SCOTS) – 1
- Light Role (1 SCOTS, 2 SCOTS, 3 SCOTS) – 3
- Air Assault/Light Role (5 SCOTS) – 1

==== King's Division ====
The six battalions of the King's Division have amalgamated into two regiments;

- Duke of Lancaster's Regiment (King's Lancashire and Border) – this is a two battalion regiment formed from the amalgamation of the King's Own Royal Border Regiment, King's Regiment and Queen's Lancashire Regiment.
  - Mechanised Infantry (1 LANCS) – 1
  - Light Role (2 LANCS) – 1
- Yorkshire Regiment – this is a three battalion regiment formed from the amalgamation of the Green Howards, Prince of Wales's Own Regiment of Yorkshire and Duke of Wellington's Regiment.
  - Armoured Infantry (3 YORKS) – 1
  - Light Role (1 YORKS, 2 YORKS)- 2

==== Prince of Wales's Division ====
The original seven battalions of the Prince of Wales's Division have been reduced to five with the transfer of the Devonshire and Dorset Regiment and the Royal Gloucestershire, Berkshire and Wiltshire Regiment to the Light Division. The five remaining battalions will amalgamate into two regiments;

- Royal Welsh – this is a two battalion regiment formed from the amalgamation of the Royal Welch Fusiliers and the Royal Regiment of Wales.
  - Armoured Infantry (2 R WELSH) – 1
  - Light Role (1 R WELSH) – 1
- Mercian Regiment – this is a three battalion regiment formed from the amalgamation of the 22nd (Cheshire) Regiment, Worcestershire and Sherwood Foresters Regiment and Staffordshire Regiment.
  - Armoured Infantry (3 MERCIAN) – 1
  - Light Role (1 MERCIAN, 2 MERCIAN) – 2

==== Queen's Division ====
The three existing large regiments of the Queen's Division remain unaffected by the restructuring.

- Princess of Wales's Royal Regiment
  - Armoured Infantry (1 PWRR) – 1
  - Light Role (2 PWRR) – 1
- Royal Regiment of Fusiliers
  - Armoured Infantry (1 RRF) – 1
  - Light Role (2 RRF) – 1
- Royal Anglian Regiment
  - Mechanised Infantry (1 R ANGLIAN) – 1
  - Light Role (2 R ANGLIAN) – 1
- Royal Gibraltar Regiment
  - Light Role (1 RG) – 1

==== Light Division ====
The four current battalions of the Light Division in two regiments were augmented by two battalions from the Prince of Wales's Division in 2005. These two were amalgamated into a single battalion and then amalgamated with Light Infantry and the Royal Green Jackets to form a new five battalion regiment, called The Rifles. On its formation, the Light Division was abolished.

- Armoured Infantry (5 RIFLES) – 1
- Light Role (2 RIFLES, 3 RIFLES) – 2
- Mechanised Infantry (4 RIFLES) – 1
- Commando (1 RIFLES) – 1

==== Other infantry regiments ====
- The single regular battalion of the Royal Irish Regiment is unamalgamated to "retain an infantry footprint in Northern Ireland".
  - Air Assault/Light Role (1 R IRISH) – 1
- The Royal Gurkha Rifles is unaffected by the restructuring. However, the UK based battalion has been integrated more fully with the rest of the infantry and trained in the air assault role.
  - Air Assault/Light Role (2 RGR) – 1
  - Light Role (1 RGR) – 1
- One battalion of the Parachute Regiment is the core of the "special forces support battalion", no longer part of the Infantry order of battle. The other three operate in the Airborne role.
  - Airborne/Light Role (2 PARA, 3 PARA) – 2

==== Territorial Army ====
With the exception of the Royal Gurkha Rifles, every line infantry regiment has at least one TA battalion (the Royal Regiment of Scotland and The Rifles have two). The Guards Division has The London Regiment as an affiliated TA battalion.

=== Strategic Defence and Security Review (2010)/Army 2020 ===
Following the 2010 General Election, the new government instituted a new defence review. The ultimate conclusion of this process was to reduce the size of the British Army from approximately 102,000 to approximately 82,000 by 2020. The detail of the process was subsequently announced as Army 2020 in July 2012. As part of this, the infantry was reduced in size from 36 regular battalions to 31. Of the five to be withdrawn, two were armoured infantry units, two general light infantry and one a specialist air assault infantry battalion. The withdrawal of two armoured infantry battalions is to bring this into line with the planned future operational structure, intended to see three "armoured infantry brigades", each with a pair of infantry battalions, forming the core of the Army's "reaction forces". These two battalions, along with the two light infantry battalions, will be disbanded and their personnel distributed among the remaining battalions of each regiment. The air assault battalion will be reduced to company strength, with the intention that it is assigned as a permanent public duties unit in Scotland.

The affected regiments were:

- Royal Regiment of Scotland
  - The Argyll and Sutherland Highlanders, 5th Battalion The Royal Regiment of Scotland – Reduced to an incremental company and assigned to public duties in Scotland.
- Royal Regiment of Fusiliers
  - 2nd Battalion, The Royal Regiment of Fusiliers – Disbanded and personnel redistributed to 1st Battalion.
- Yorkshire Regiment (14th/15th, 19th and 33rd/76th Foot)
  - 2nd Battalion, The Yorkshire Regiment (14th/15th, 19th and 33rd/76th Foot) (Green Howards) – Disbanded and personnel redistributed to 1st and 3rd Battalions. 3 YORKS will eventually be renamed as 1 YORKS. 1 YORKS will eventually be renumbered as 2 YORKS.
- Mercian Regiment
  - 3rd Battalion, The Mercian Regiment (Staffords) – Disbanded and personnel redistributed to 1st and 2nd Battalions.
- Royal Welsh
  - 2nd Battalion, The Royal Welsh (Royal Regiment of Wales) – Disbanded and personnel redistributed to 1st Battalion.

In addition, the Royal Irish Regiment (27th (Inniskilling), 83rd, 87th and Ulster Defence Regiment) was transferred to the administration of the Prince of Wales' Division.

=== Army 2020 Refine ===
Under a further review called Army 2020 Refine, the 1st Battalion, Scots Guards and the 4th Battalion, The Royal Regiment of Scotland will be equipped with Mechanised Infantry Vehicles and form the core of the first Strike Brigade under the Reaction Force. Five infantry battalions will undertake the new specialist infantry role; these units will provide an increased contribution to countering terrorism and building stability overseas, and will number around 300 personnel. Four of these battalions, 1st Battalion, The Royal Regiment of Scotland; 2nd Battalion, The Princess of Wales's Royal Regiment; 2nd Battalion, The Duke of Lancaster's Regiment; and 4th Battalion, The Rifles, will be existing battalions, while the fifth will be formed as a new battalion of the Royal Gurkha Rifles

==== Guards Division ====
- Heavy Protected Mobility Infantry (1 SG) – 1
- Light Role Infantry (1 COLDM GDS, 1 IG) – 2
- Light Role/Public Duties (1 GREN GDS, 1 WG) – 2
- Public Duties (2 GREN GDS, 2 COLDM GDS, 2 SG)^{α}
- Army Reserve (LONDONS) – 1

All five battalions will periodically rotate roles

==== Scottish, Welsh and Irish Division ====
- Armoured Infantry (1 R WELSH) – 1
- Heavy Protected Mobility Infantry (4 SCOTS) – 1
- Light Protected Mobility Infantry (3 SCOTS, 1 R IRISH) – 2
- Light Role Infantry (2 SCOTS) – 1
- Specialised Training Infantry (1 SCOTS) – 1
- Public Duties – (5 SCOTS)^{α}
- Army Reserve – (6 SCOTS, 7 SCOTS, 3 R WELSH, 2 R IRISH) – 4

==== King's Division ====
- Armoured Infantry (1 YORKS, 1 MERCIAN) – 2
- Light Protected Mobility Infantry (2 YORKS) – 1
- Light Role Infantry (1 LANCS, 2 MERCIAN) – 2
- Specialised Training Infantry (2 LANCS) – 1
- Army Reserve (4 LANCS, 4 YORKS, 4 MERCIAN) – 3

==== Queen's Division ====
- Armoured Infantry (1 PWRR, 1 RRF) – 2
- Light Protected Mobility Infantry (2 R ANGLIAN) – 1
- Light Role Infantry (1 R ANGLIAN) – 1
- Light Role Infantry (Home Defence) (1 RG) – 1
- Specialised Training Infantry (2 PWRR) – 1
- Army Reserve (3 PWRR, 4 PWRR, 5 RRF, 3 R ANGLIAN) – 4

==== The Rifles ====
- Armoured Infantry (5 RIFLES) – 1
- Light Protected Mobility Infantry (3 RIFLES) – 1
- Light Role Infantry (1 RIFLES, 2 RIFLES) – 2
- Specialised Training Infantry (4 RIFLES) – 1
- Army Reserve (6 RIFLES, 7 RIFLES, 8 RIFLES) – 3

==== Other infantry regiments ====
- Light Role Infantry (1 RGR, 2 RGR) – 2
- Parachute Infantry (2 PARA, 3 PARA) – 2
- Specialised Training Infantry (3 RGR) – 1
- Army Reserve (4 PARA) – 1

:^α These are the battalions represented by the four incremental companies

== Other regiments ==
=== Disbanded regiments ===
Over time, a handful of infantry regiments have disappeared from the roll through disbandment rather than amalgamation. In the twentieth century, eight regiments disappeared like this:

- In 1920, the Guards Machine Gun Regiment, a specialist infantry regiment originally formed in 1917, and given the status of a foot guards regiment (ranked as the sixth regiment of foot guards), was disbanded.
- In 1922, following cuts to the size of the armed forces after the First World War and the establishment of the Irish Free State, the five infantry regiments solely from the south of Ireland were disbanded:
  - The Royal Irish Regiment
  - The Connaught Rangers
  - The Prince of Wales's Leinster Regiment (Royal Canadians)
  - The Royal Munster Fusiliers
  - The Royal Dublin Fusiliers
- In 1968, after a re-organisation of the army, two regiments opted to be placed in suspended animation rather than amalgamate, and were eventually disbanded in 1987:
  - The Cameronians (Scottish Rifles)
  - The York and Lancaster Regiment

=== Honourable Artillery Company ===
The Honourable Artillery Company included infantry battalions from its formation up to 1973 when its infantry wing was amalgamated with its artillery batteries in a new role.

=== Regiments that never were ===
Since the Cardwell reforms began, infantry regiments in the British Army have amalgamated on many occasions. However, there have been occasions where amalgamations have been announced, but have then been abandoned:

- The Royal Regiment of Gloucestershire and Hampshire – planned as the amalgamation of the Gloucestershire Regiment and the Royal Hampshire Regiment. This was announced in July 1968 to be implemented in September 1970, but was cancelled in the autumn of that year. The two regiments were subsequently amalgamated with others to form the Royal Gloucestershire, Berkshire and Wiltshire Regiment and the Princess of Wales's Royal Regiment (Queen's and Royal Hampshires)
- The Royal Scots Borderers – planned as the amalgamation of the Royal Scots and the King's Own Scottish Borderers as part of Options for Change. This was cancelled on 3 February 1993. The name was resurrected with the formation of the Royal Regiment of Scotland, when the two regiments amalgamated as a single battalion.
- The Cheshire and Staffordshire Regiment – planned as the amalgamation of the 22nd (Cheshire) Regiment and the Staffordshire Regiment as part of Options for Change. This was cancelled on 3 February 1993. The two regiments were subsequently amalgamated as part of the Mercian Regiment.
- The Executive Committee of the Army Board proposed under Delivering Security in a Changing World that there would be a series of two battalion regiments formed. These may have included:
  - A two battalion Lowland regiment formed from the Royal Scots and the King's Own Scottish Borderers.
  - A two battalion Highland regiment formed from the Royal Highland Fusiliers, Black Watch, Highlanders, and Argyll and Sutherland Highlanders.
  - A two battalion Wessex regiment formed from the Devonshire and Dorset Regiment and Royal Gloucestershire, Berkshire and Wiltshire Regiment.
- Sikh Regiment – in 2007, Sikh leaders in the United Kingdom informed the Army that they would be able to find enough volunteers to form an initial infantry battalion of 700 from within their community. However, the Ministry of Defence, having requested advice from the Commission for Racial Equality, decided to reject the proposal on the grounds that it would be "divisive and amounted to segregation". In 2015, the idea was revisited, with the Army evaluating the idea. However, the then Defence Secretary stated that he was 'wary of separating military units according to religion'. The idea was again dropped in 2016. The Prince of Wales had made a similar suggestion in 2001.

== Order of precedence ==
Preceded by Royal Corps of Signals	Order of precedence	Succeeded by Special Air Service
