= Land Warfare Centre (United Kingdom) =

- Country: United Kingdom
- Branch: British Army
- Part of: Land Forces Troops
- Headquarters: Waterloo Lines

Commanders
- Director Land Warfare: Major General Chris Barry CBE

The Land Warfare Centre (LWC) is a formation of the British Army that commands training schools in the UK and Brunei, and training areas in Belize, Canada and Kenya.

== Structure ==
Headquarters, Land Warfare Centre, at Waterloo Lines, Warminster.

=== Collective Training Group ===
- British Army Training Unit Suffield (BATUS), at Suffield (Canada)
- British Army Training Unit Kenya (BATUK), at Nanyuki (Kenya)
- British Army Training and Support Unit Belize (BATSUB), at Ladyville (Belize)
- Command, Staff and Tactical Training Group (CSTTG)
- Mission Ready Training Centre (MRTC), at Royston
- Combat Ready Training Centre, at Salisbury Plain Training Area

=== Army Schools ===
- The Royal School of Military Engineering Group (RSME)
  - 1 Royal School of Military Engineering Regiment, at Chatham
  - 3 Royal School of Military Engineering Regiment, at Minley
- Army Aviation Centre
  - 2 Training Regiment, Army Air Corps, at Middle Wallop Flying Station
- The Royal School of Artillery (RSA)
  - 14 Regiment, Royal Artillery, at Larkhill
- Defence College of Support (DCSp)
  - Defence School of Logistics and Administration at Worthy Down
  - Defence School of Policing and Security at Southwick Park
  - Defence School of Transport at Leconfield
    - 25 Training Regiment, Royal Logistic Corps, at Leconfield

=== Experimentation and Trials Group ===
- Infantry Trials and Development Unit (ITDU)
- Armoured Trials and Development Unit (ATDU)
- Royal Artillery Trials and Development Unit (RA TDU)
- Royal Engineers Trials and Development Unit (RE TDU)
- Combat Service Support Training and Development Unit (CSS TDU)
- 2nd Battalion, Royal Yorkshire Regiment, at Chester

=== Combat Manoeuvre Centre ===
- Royal Armoured Corps Training Regiment, at Bovington
- Armoured Fighting Vehicle Schools Regiment, at Bovington
- Infantry Battle School, at Brecon
- Combined Arms Manoeuvre School, at Warminster
- Land Special Operations Training Centre, at Pirbright
- HQ Small Arms School Corps
- Gurkha Company (Tavoleto), Training Support Unit
