= RAF Flowerdown =

Former Royal Air Force station in Hampshire, England

RAF Flowerdown
- Near Winchester, Hampshire in England

Site information
- Type: RAF Listening station
- Owner: Ministry of Defence
- Operator: Royal Air Force

Location
- Shown within Hampshire RAF Flowerdown (the United Kingdom)
- Coordinates: 51.060°N 1.345°W

Site history
- Built: 1918
- In use: 1918-1979, 1986-Present

Royal Air Force Flowerdown or more simply RAF Flowerdown was a Royal Flying Corps, Royal Air Force and finally Royal Navy non-flying station located in Hampshire, England.

The Royal Flying Corps (RFC) School for Wireless Operators moved from Farnborough to Flowerdown, later RAF Flowerdown in 1918. From April 1926 the Electrical and Wireless School, part of 23 Group, Inland Area, was located at Flowerdown. The apprentice training school moved from Flowerdown to Cranwell in 1929 and the RNAS moved into Flowerdown which remained as a wireless station until 1956. It was never an airfield but it was bombed twice in one week.

During the Second World War, Flowerdown was one of a number of listening stations around the country that fed information into Bletchley Park with staff working 12-hour shifts listening to Morse code which was then used to decipher the German codes.

In 1956 the site was taken over by GCHQ's Composite Signals Organisation as a large HF listening station. It closed in the late 1970s.

In 1986 the site became the new depot for the Light Division when they moved from Peninsula Barracks, Winchester and was named Sir John Moore Barracks. The barracks went on to become the home of the Army Training Regiment, Winchester.
