= 167 Regiment RLC =

- Active: 1993 – present
- Country: United Kingdom
- Branch: British Army
- Role: Catering Support, Communication Support, Logistic Staff Support
- Size: Regiment; 397 personnel
- Part of: Royal Logistic Corps
- Garrison/HQ: Prince William of Gloucester Barracks

Commanders
- Current commander: Lt Col Joel Rathbone

167 Regiment is a reserve regiment of the British Army's Royal Logistic Corps.

== History ==
The regiment was formed as the Catering Support Regiment, Royal Logistic Corps in 1993 replacing the Army Catering Corps.

== Structure ==
The current structure is as follows:

- 111 Catering Squadron
- 112 Catering Squadron
- 113 Headquarters Squadron
- 497 Operational Support Unit
- 498 Operational Sustainment Unit
- 500 Communications Squadron
- Sustainment School - including the Army Reserve School of Catering

The regiment has its headquarters and training facilities at Prince William of Gloucester Barracks in Grantham, Lincolnshire.
