= Bassingbourn Barracks =

Military installation in Cambridgeshire, England

- Near Bassingbourn, Cambridgeshire in England
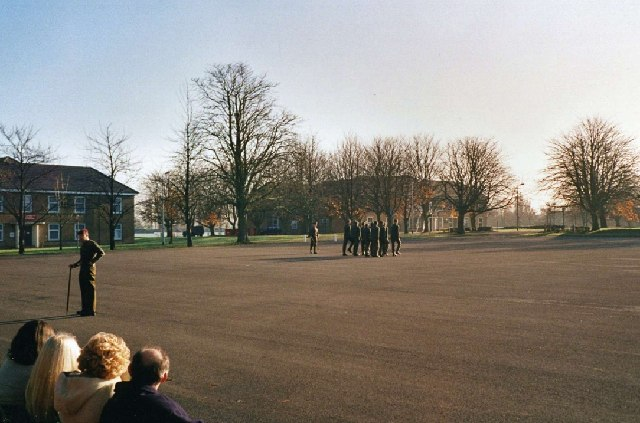
- A passing-out parade at Bassingbourn army camp

Site information
- Type: Barracks
- Owner: Ministry of Defence
- Operator: Defence Infrastructure Organisation

Location
- Location within Cambridgeshire
- Coordinates: 52°05′39″N 00°03′00″W

Site history
- Built: 1970
- In use: 1970–2012; 2014–2014; 2018–Present

Garrison information
- Occupants: Mission Ready Training Centre (MRTC)

Bassingbourn Barracks is a Ministry of Defence installation located 3.2 miles (5.1 km) north of Royston, Hertfordshire and 10.6 miles (17.1 km) southwest of Cambridge, Cambridgeshire, England.

== History ==
=== Early history ===
The barracks were established on the site of the former RAF Bassingbourn airfield in January 1970, as the new Depot for the Queen's Division. The depot was responsible for training recruits undergoing their 19-week basic training before joining a regular battalion. In 1993, the barracks were re-designated the home of the Army Training Regiment, Bassingbourn, and remained as such for nearly 20 years. Bassingbourn Barracks closed as an army training location in August 2012.

=== Libyan cadet scandal ===
In June 2014, the barracks reopened to train Libyan General Purpose Force troops. Although nearby residents were originally informed that the Libyan cadets would only be permitted to leave the base on escorted visits the rules were subsequently relaxed. Shortly afterwards, a number of complaints of sexual assault were made against some of the trainees. Five were later charged with a series of sexual offences against both women and men: of these, two appeared before Cambridge Magistrates' Court and admitted carrying out a series of assaults on women in Cambridge's Market Square area on 26 October 2014, two were charged with raping a man in Cambridge, and the fifth was charged with three counts of sexual assault. As a result, the Ministry of Defence (MoD) decided to terminate the training programme early, saying in a statement in November 2014: "Training was initially expected to last until the end of November but we have agreed with the Libyan government that it is best for all involved to bring forward the training completion date. The recruits will be returning to Libya in the coming days”. It was also discovered that a further five of the trainees had applied for asylum in the UK.

On 15 May 2015, two Libyan cadets were each jailed for 12 years for raping a man in Cambridge in a prolonged attack in Christ's Pieces, a park in the city centre. Following the sentencing, Andrew Lansley, the South Cambridgeshire MP at the time that the attacks took place, told the BBC "mistakes had been made" adding that he hoped the sentencing would provide some "redress" and acknowledging that "discipline inside the base really fell apart". A spokesman for the Ministry of Defence (MoD) said it "condemned" the incidents adding that such training "will not be repeated at Bassingbourn. Following the conclusion of the training the prime minister tasked the MoD with producing a report on the programme and the defence secretary has now presented its findings to the House of Commons".

After the rape trial verdicts were returned, it was revealed that three other Libyan cadets had already pleaded guilty to unrelated sex attacks which had taken place in Cambridge on the same night. They had been sentenced at Norwich Crown Court on 13 May but reporting restrictions had been in place until the rape case was concluded. Of the three defendants, one admitted two counts of sexual assault and the theft of a bicycle and was jailed for 12 months; the second admitted three counts of sexual assault, one count of exposure and the theft of a bicycle and was jailed 10 months; the third admitted two counts of sexual assault, one count of using threatening, abusive or insulting words or behaviour and the theft of a bicycle and was jailed for 10 months. All three were put on the sex offender register for 10 years.

The Libyan soldiers also caused damage costing £500,000 to repair.

=== Re-opening ===
In December 2018, Bassingbourn Barracks was reopened as home to the Mission Ready Training Centre (MRTC), a unit responsible for training troops for operations abroad. MRTC combines the Mission Training and Mobilisation Centre, previously based at Shorncliffe Camp in Folkestone, with the Mission Training and Mobilisation Centre (Individual), previously based at Chetwynd Barracks in Nottingham.

Units undertake a series of training activities culminating in a Mission Rehearsal Exercise (MRX). During the MRX, soldiers practise scenarios they may encounter during their operational tour, including; vehicle patrols, speaking with the local population, treating casualties, and dealing with suspected IEDs (Improvised Explosive Devices).

== Tower Museum, Bassingbourn ==
Opened in 1974, the Tower Museum, Bassingbourn is located in the original pre-war air traffic control (ATC) tower (watch office) of RAF Bassingbourn. The museum is focused on the history of the airfield during the Second World War and the men and women of the RAF and USAAF who trained and worked there during that war. Exhibits include photographs, documents and military artefacts about the RAF, USAAF and the 91st Bombardment Group. The museum is currently closed.

== In popular culture ==
Bassingbourn Barracks was used for location filming of the movie Full Metal Jacket in 1985 standing-in for the Marine Corps Recruit Depot Parris Island, South Carolina. Some of the Vietnam scenes were filmed at Bassingbourn, and palm trees imported for the film were left on site and could be seen for a period of time after filming. British Army recruits based at Bassingbourn during the filming were used as extras.

== Cadet Forces ==
Royal Air Force Air Cadets

Since approximately 1970 the site has retained its RAF links by being the home of 2484 (Bassingbourn) Squadron Air Training Corps.

Army Cadet Force

The barracks has an annex on-site that is used routinely by Bedfordshire and Hertfordshire ACF.
