= Defence Animal Training Regiment =

- Regiment logo
- Active: 1946 – present
- Country: United Kingdom
- Branch: British Army
- Type: Training regiment
- Role: Training for veterinarians, farriers, military working dogs, and horses
- Part of: Royal Army Veterinary Corps
- Garrison: Remount Barracks, Melton Mowbray
- Website: Official website

The Defence Animal Training Regiment (DATR) is a training establishment, based in Melton Mowbray, east Leicestershire. It trains animals, of which the most numerous are dogs, for all three armed forces. Its headquarters are also the principal base of the Royal Army Veterinary Corps.

== History ==
The site at Melton Mowbray succeeded the former Army School of Equitation at Weedon in Northamptonshire, closed in 1940. The Army first occupied the Melton Mowbray site in 1946, and it became known as the Defence Animal Centre. RAF Police dogs began to be trained at the centre from 1994, after merging RAF and Army dog training in April 1991.

As Colonel-in-Chief of the Royal Army Veterinary Corps, Anne, Princess Royal, opened a new Army School of Equitation Riding School at the Defence Animal Centre on 28 February 2008.

== Regimental structure ==
The Defence Animal Training Regiment consists of three training squadrons and one training school, which are all based at Remount Barracks in Melton Mowbray.

- Canine Training Squadron – the squadron trains 200 military working dogs per year for the British armed forces, and about 100 others for civilian border and security services, and foreign armed forces; it provides basic training for dog handlers; it also operates a canine veterinary hospital.
- Veterinary Training Squadron – the squadron provides specialist military training for personnel who are already qualified as civilian vets, usually for the first twelve months of their military service; the squadron also provides the primary health care for animals at the Melton Mowbray site.
- Equine Training Squadron – with stabling for 140 horses and 240 acres (0.97 km^{2}) of grazing for 260 horses, the squadron provides training for all horses destined for the Household Cavalry (Life Guards and Blues and Royals) and for the King's Troop, Royal Horse Artillery.
- Army School of Farriery – this is a centre of excellence in military farriery and trains all of the British Army's farriers; it is officially recognised by the Worshipful Company of Farriers and the Farriers Registered Council. International farrier competitions are held at the centre annually.

== Function ==
=== Organisation requirements ===
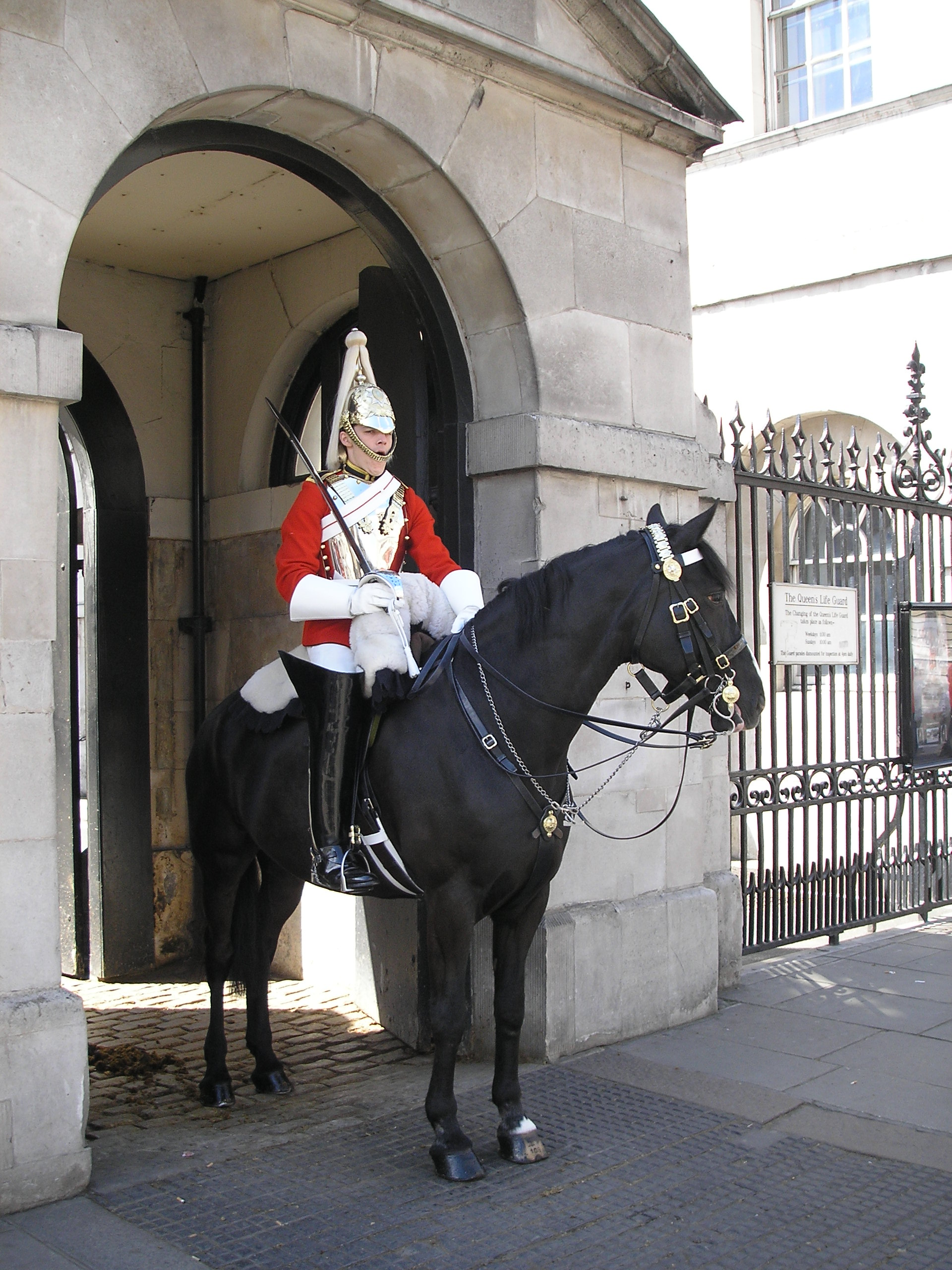
British Army Horse (Household Cavalry) on duty in London.

As well as British defence organisations, it prepares dogs for the UK Immigration Service, HM Prison Service, HM Revenue and Customs (former HM Customs and Excise), other UK government agencies and overseas agencies including the Irish Revenue Customs Service. UK police dogs are trained in-house at nine regional training centres, such as the Met's site at Keston and Scotland's centre at Pollok Country Park.

=== Detection skills ===
The dogs, often Springer Spaniels, Labradors and Belgian Shepherds are mainly trained as detection dogs to detect drugs, bombs and ancillary parts. Substances the dogs are trained to detect include TNT, Cordtex, C-4 and Semtex.

=== Supply of animals ===
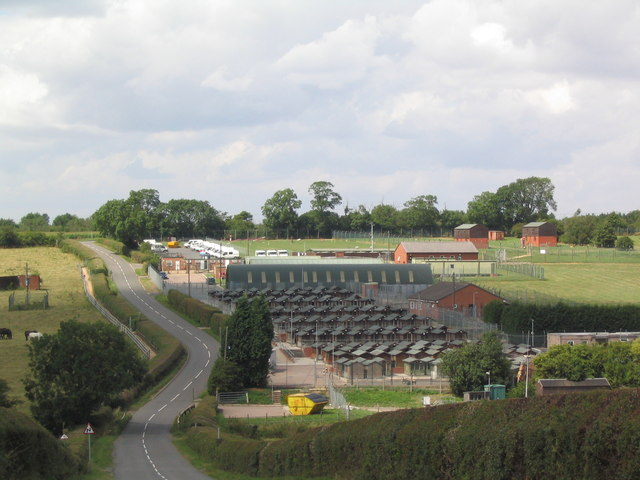
The Defence Animal Training Regiment establishment, based in Melton Mowbray, Leicestershire.

It trains about 100-150 dogs a year, taking about four to six months to train. Some dogs are donated by the general public with the rest often purchased from both national and international vendors. The Services Veterinary Hospital looks after the health of all the dogs (Canine Training Squadron) and horses (Equine Training Squadron) of the UK armed forces (mainly the British Army). The site was used as a training ground for the London Olympics 2012 for cycling and equestrian events.

=== In combat ===
In the field, some military (and police) dogs can be fitted with special bullet-proof vests to protect them.
