= Pirbright Camp =

British Army installation in Pirbright, Surrey

- Pirbright
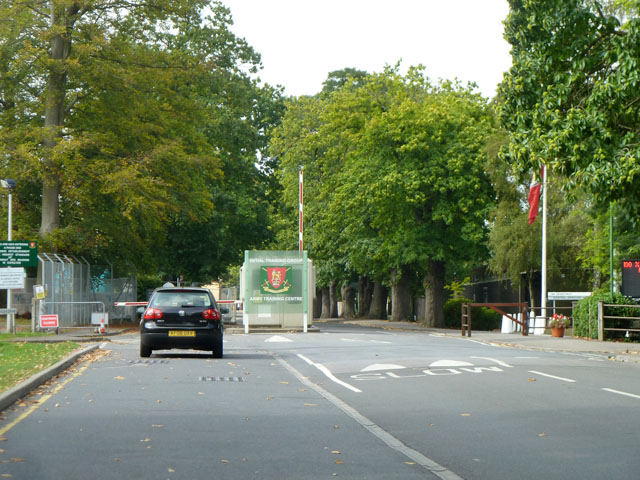
- Pirbright Camp entrance

Site information
- Owner: Ministry of Defence
- Operator: British Army

Location
- Location within Surrey
- Coordinates: 51°18′13″N 00°39′50″W

Site history
- Built: 1875
- Built for: War Office

Pirbright Camp is a British Army installation in Pirbright, Surrey. It houses the Army Training Centre Pirbright, and a number of other units.

== History ==
In 1875, the War Office acquired 3,070 acres (12.4 km^{2}) of Pirbright's heath which is the southern end of the north-south range of sand hills in Surrey heath, known as Chobham Ridges. It established rifle ranges, a training depot and an 'encampment' for the Brigade of Guards here. Many of the current buildings date from the 1950s, with significant expansion in the 1970s.

In April 2021, following the Death of the Duke of Edinburgh, members from across the armed forces, including: the Household Cavalry, Queen's Royal Hussars, Grenadier Guards, Coldstream Guards, Scots Guards, Welsh Guards, The Highlanders, Royal Gurkha Rifles, and The Rifles; along with personnel from the Royal Marines, Royal Navy, and Queen's Colour Squadron of the Royal Air Force all took part in training at Brunswick Lines in preparation for his funeral.

== Current units ==
- Alexander Barracks
  - Army Training Centre Pirbright
- Elizabeth Barracks
  - 3rd Battalion, Ranger Regiment
- Brunswick Lines
  - Household Division and Parachute Regiment Centralised Courses

== In media ==
Pirbright was the filming location for British Army Girls, a three-part television documentary first shown on Channel 4 in April 2016.
