= Infantry Battle School =

Coordinates: 51.9423°N 3.36555°W

Infantry Battle School, Brecon
- Active: 1939-Present
- Country: United Kingdom
- Branch: British Army
- Type: Training
- Role: Infantry Training
- Part of: Army Recruiting and Training Division

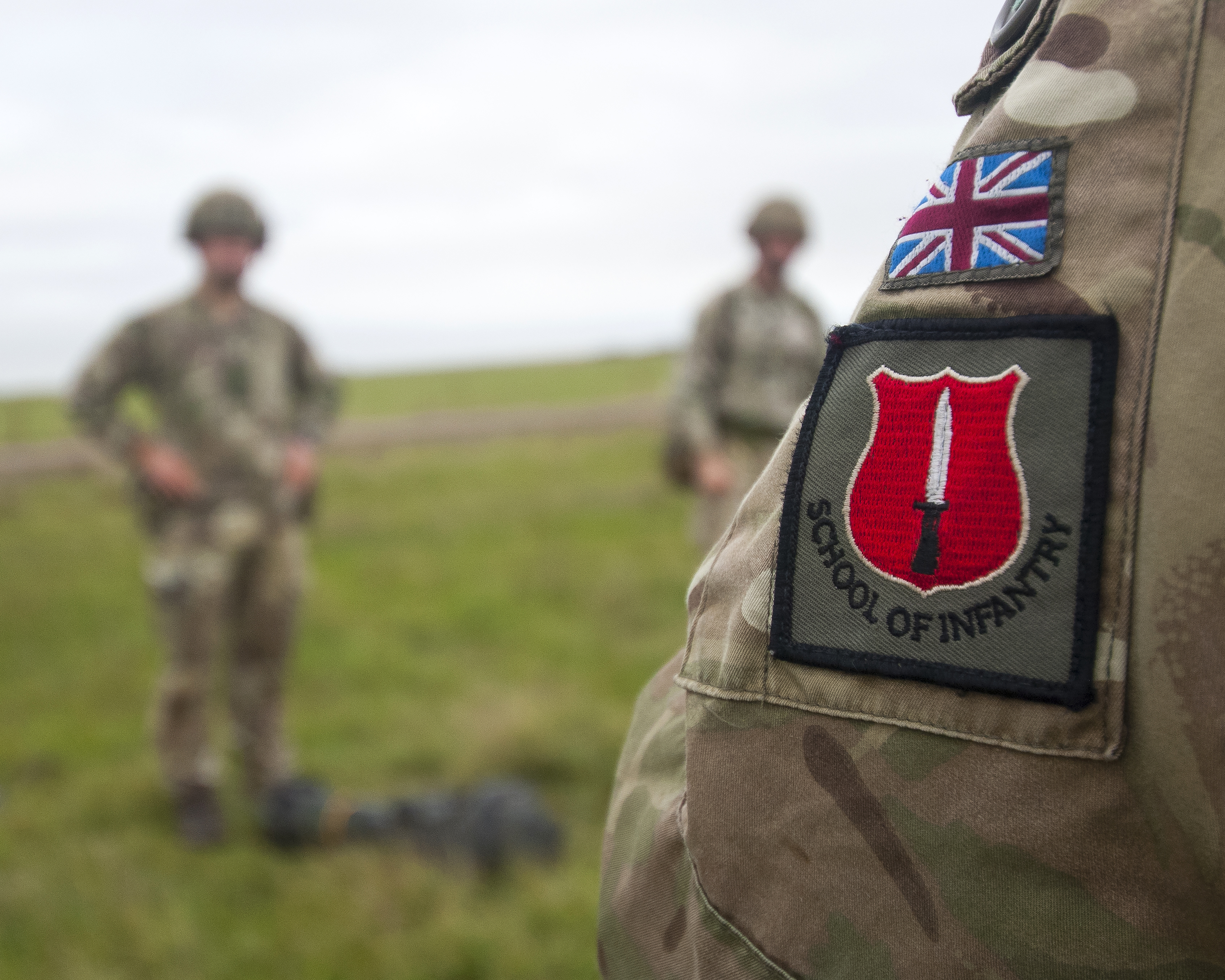
Soldiers at the Infantry Battle School.

The Infantry Battle School, Brecon is a British Army training establishment at Dering Lines in Brecon, Wales.

== History ==
The Infantry Battle School was established at Brecon in 1939, at the start of the Second World War. The Parachute Regiment formed a battle camp there in 1961, which was absorbed by the Tactical Training Wing of the School of Infantry in 1976. The school was further redeveloped in 1995.

A sub-unit of the Royal Gurkha Rifles, Gurkha Wing (Mandalay), is tasked with providing realistic OPFOR training for those at the IBS.

== Courses ==
The Platoon Sergeants' Battle Course badge.

Courses run at the Infantry Battle School:

- Live Fire Tactical Training Course
- All Arms Skill At Arms Instructor Course
- All Arms Range Management Course
- Urban Operator Instructor Course
- Close Quarter Battle Instructor Course
- Dismounted Close Combat Trainer
- Platoon Commanders’ Battle Course
- Platoon Sergeants’ Battle Course
- Section Commanders’ Battle Course
