= Infantry Training Centre (British Army) =

Infantry Training Centre Catterick
- Active: 1995-Present
- Country: United Kingdom
- Branch: British Army
- Type: Training
- Role: Infantry Training
- Size: Three battalions
- Part of: Army Recruiting and Initial Training Command (ARITC)
- Garrison/HQ: Catterick

The Infantry Training Centre (ITC) is a unit of the British Army, administered by HQ School of Infantry and responsible for the basic training and advanced training of soldiers and officers joining the infantry. The unit's headquarters are at Catterick, North Yorkshire.

== History ==
ITC Catterick assumed overall responsibility for all infantry phase 2 training from the three Infantry Training Battalion sites at Catterick, Strensall and Ouston on 1 May 1995. As of May 2002, the ITC assumed full control of all infantry phase 1 and 2 training for the Regular Army in a single Combat Infantryman's Course (CIC). The course was subsequently renamed the Combat Infantry Course (CIC) to reflect the inclusion of female recruits.

== Training regime ==
Whereas initial training for other army roles is delivered in two stages - Phase 1 (basic training) and Phase 2 (trade-specific training) - the Combat Infantry Course combines both into a single course for Standard Entrants aged 17.5 years and above. (Junior Entrants enlisted from age 16 and destined for the infantry receive their Phase 1 basic training separately at the Army Foundation College in Harrogate before joining ITC for their Phase 2 training.)

The basic CIC lasts 26 weeks, in which the basics of infantry soldiering are taught:

- Personal administration
- Weapons training
- Drill
- Fieldcraft
- Fitness
- Teamwork

Both the Foot Guards and Parachute Regiment have extended versions of the CIC that last an additional two weeks. New recruits to the Foot Guards undertake an extended drill programme for regular public duties. The Parachute Regiment course incorporates additional fitness work with Pegasus Company, including eight demanding assessments such as a 20-mile endurance march and milling, a gruelling test derived from boxing.

The course for new Gurkha recruits lasts for 37 weeks, incorporating the CIC course with English language training and cultural orientation for the United Kingdom.

== Structure ==
ITC Catterick is divided into three Battalions, of which two are Infantry Training Battalions (ITB) and one is a support Battalion (ITC).

- 1st Infantry Training Battalion is responsible for training soldiers destined to join the regiments of the Queen's Division, The Rifles, the King's Division and the Scottish, Welsh and Irish Division. The 1st Battalion has five training companies:
  - A Company
  - B Company
  - C Company
  - D Company
- 2nd Infantry Training Battalion has responsibility for training recruits who will join one of the regiments of the Guards Division, the Parachute Regiment and the Brigade of Gurkhas. 2 ITB is also responsible for the Phase 2 training for junior entry recruits from the Army Foundation College, as well as training for the infantry elements of the Army Reserve.
  - Guards Training Company
  - Parachute Regiment Training Company
  - Gurkha Training Company
  - Anzio Company
- The ITC Support Battalion is the ITC's primary support unit, dealing with logistic and medical support. The battalion has the following departments:
  - Headquarter (HQ) Company
  - Hook VC Company (discharged soldiers)
  - Slim Company (Rehabilitation)
  - Gym
  - Army School of Ceremonial
  - Army School of Bagpipe Music and Highland Drumming
  - Quartermaster's (QMs) Department
  - G7 Training
  - 400 Troop, Royal Logistic Corps

== See also ==
- Recruit training
- Infantry of the British army
- P Company
