= Sir John Moore Barracks, Winchester =

Sir John Moore Barracks
- Winchester
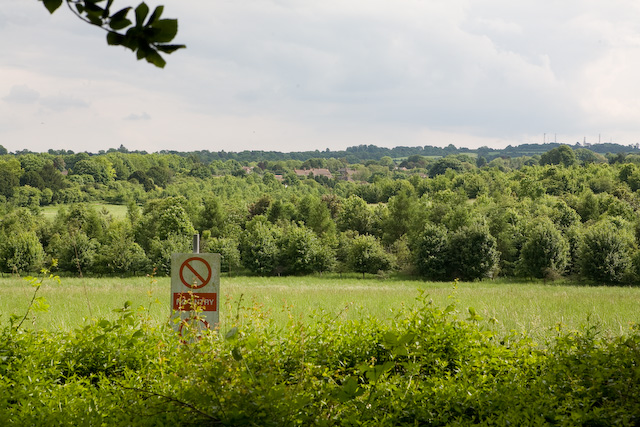
- Sir John Moore Barracks

Site information
- Type: Training
- Owner: Ministry of Defence
- Operator: British Army

Location
- Location within Hampshire
- Coordinates: 51°05′25″N 01°20′18″W

Site history
- Built: 1986
- Built for: War Office
- In use: 1986–2026

Garrison information
- Occupants: Army Training Regiment Winchester

Sir John Moore Barracks is a military installation near Winchester.

== History ==
The site used to be known as RAF Flowerdown until 1986 when it was renamed Sir John Moore Barracks, after Lieutenant General Sir John Moore, and became the new depot for the Light Division when they moved from Peninsula Barracks, Winchester.

The barracks went on to become the home of the Army Training Regiment, Winchester. ATR Winchester delivers the 14-week training course to non-infantry adult (age 17+) recruits.

== Current units ==
- Army Training Regiment (ATR) Winchester

== Future ==
In November 2016 the Ministry of Defence announced that the site would close in 2021. This was later extended to 2024, and once more to 2026.
