= Prince William of Gloucester Barracks =

Barracks near Grantham, Lincolnshire, England

- Grantham
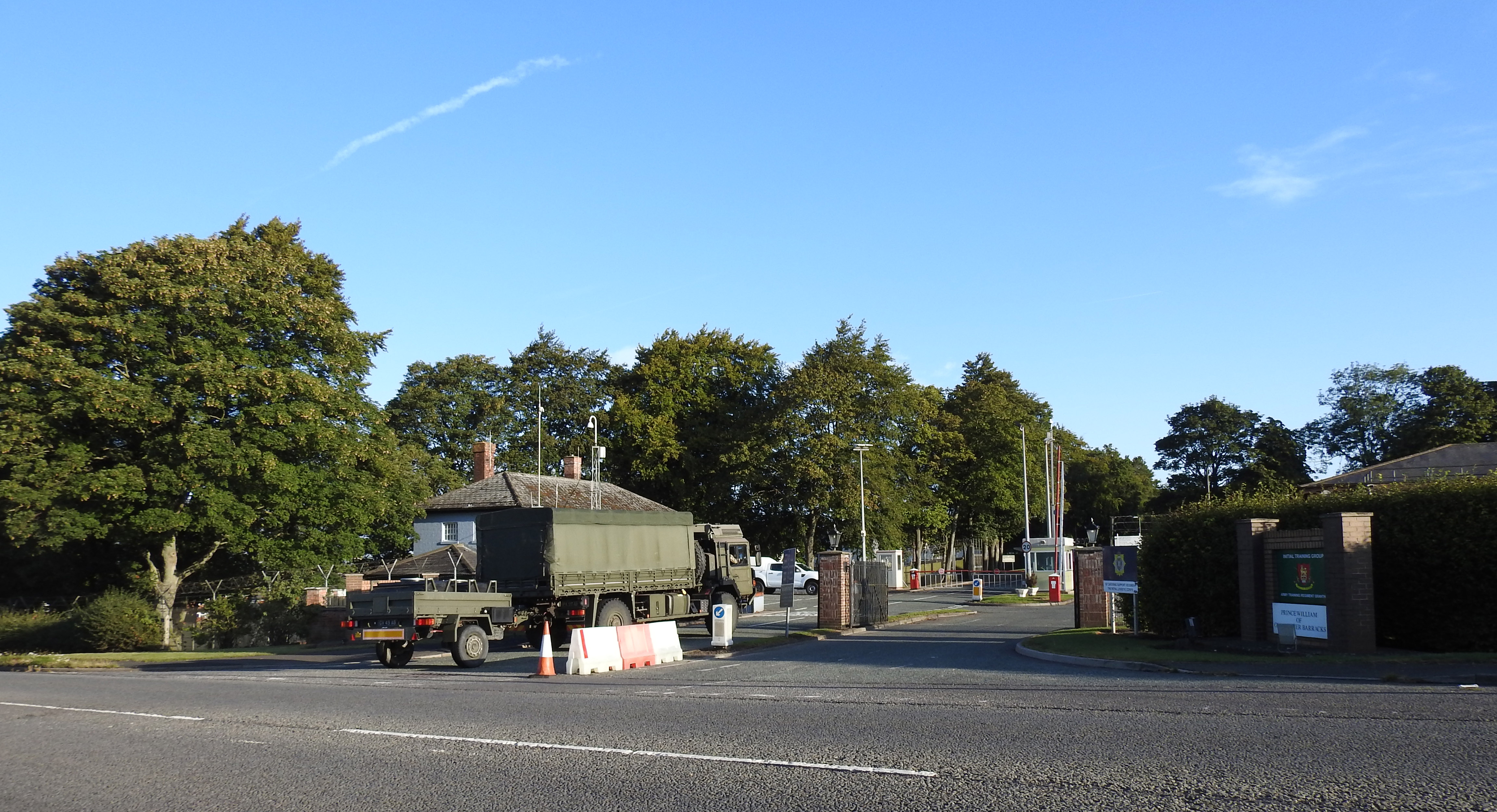
- Entrance to Prince William of Gloucester Barracks

Site information
- Type: Barracks
- Owner: Ministry of Defence
- Operator: British Army

Location
- Location within Lincolnshire
- Coordinates: 52°53′56″N 00°36′47″W

Site history
- Built: 1977
- In use: 1977–present

Garrison information
- Occupants: Army Training Regiment Grantham

Prince William of Gloucester Barracks is a British Army installation in Grantham in Lincolnshire.

== History ==
The barracks were established on the site of the former RAF Spitalgate airbase in October 1976, as the new Central Volunteer Headquarters for the Royal Corps of Transport. The barracks were formally named after Prince William of Gloucester at a ceremony held in March 1977, led by Princess Alice, Duchess of Gloucester. The Central Volunteer Headquarters were renamed the Royal Corps of Transport Territorial Army Depot and Training Centre in 1979. The facility provided centralised training for all volunteer members of the Royal Corps of Transport. In 1982, the first holder of the new post of Commander Royal Corps of Transport Territorial Army ('Commander RCT TA') moved into the barracks. In the 1980s, the barracks also served as home to 54th Infantry Brigade.

The barracks remain home to the Army Training Regiment (Grantham), which provides phase one training to Army Reserve recruits.

== Future ==
In September 2016, it was announced that the barracks were to be sold by the Ministry of Defence. In November 2016, the Ministry of Defence announced that the site would close in 2020. This was later extended to 2029.

== Current units ==
Current units based at the camp include:

- Headquarters, 102nd Logistic Brigade
- 167 Catering Support Regiment, Royal Logistic Corps
- 294 (Grantham) Supply Squadron, 159 Regiment, Royal Logistic Corps
- 2 Operational Support Group, Royal Logistic Corps
- Home Headquarters, Royal Lancers
- Army Training Regiment Grantham
