= Tony Deane-Drummond =

British Army general (1917–2012)

Major-General Tony Deane-Drummond CB DSO MC*
- Born: Anthony John Deane-Drummond; June 1917; Upton-upon-Severn, Worcestershire, England
- Died: 4 December 2012 (aged 95)
- Military career
- Allegiance: United Kingdom
- Branch: British Army
- Service years: 1937–1971
- Rank: Major-General
- Service number: 71076
- Units: Royal Corps of Signals 3rd Parachute Brigade; 22 Special Air Service Regiment; 44th Parachute Brigade; 3rd Division
- Conflicts: Second World War; Palestine Emergency; Malayan Emergency
- Awards: Companion of the Order of the Bath; Distinguished Service Order; Military Cross & Bar; Mentioned in despatches (2)
- Other work: British Gliding Champion, 1957; Assistant Chief of the Defence Staff for Operations, 1968; Colonel Commandant of the Royal Corps of Signals, 1966–1971

Major-General Anthony John Deane-Drummond, CB, DSO, MC & Bar (23 June 1917 – 4 December 2012) was an officer of the Royal Signals in the British Army, whose career was mostly spent with airborne forces.

During the Second World War, he was the second-in-command of a commando force which destroyed an aqueduct in southern Italy, and was captured by enemy forces. He escaped from captivity, was recaptured, escaped again, and eventually made his way back to England sixteen months after the raid. He later served in Operation Market-Garden and was captured at Arnhem, but successfully escaped for a third time. After the War, he commanded 22 SAS Regiment in Malaya and Oman, and held a number of staff positions, later commanding a division in the British Army of the Rhine before retiring.

== Early life ==
Anthony Deane-Drummond was born to father Colonel J.D. Deane-Drummond DSO OBE MC and mother Marie (née de Cuadra) of Madrid. He had two sisters, including Marigold Deane-Drummond. Their parents divorced, and the children were subsequently brought up by their mother in Little Barrington.

Deane-Drummond was educated at Marlborough College and the Royal Military Academy, Woolwich. He joined the Army after leaving Woolwich, being commissioned into the Royal Corps of Signals on 28 January 1937.

== Wartime service ==
During the Second World War, Deane-Drummond served in Europe and in North Africa; he volunteered for Commando duty, and was assigned as second–in–command of the force which participated in Operation Colossus, an airborne raid on southern Italy in February 1941. Although the raid successfully destroyed its target (the Tragino Aqueduct), every member of the unit was taken prisoner by Italian forces.

After unsuccessful plans in June and July had to be called off, Deane-Drummond managed to escape from captivity in December. After being recaptured near the Swiss border, he was held in an Italian prisoner–of–war camp for several months before being transferred to a hospital in Florence in May 1942. He escaped from there in June, and made it to Switzerland. He then was taken to southern France, and was picked up by the Royal Navy in mid–July 1942. He received the Military Cross for his successful escape.

On his return to England, Deane-Drummond was posted to the newly–formed 1st Airborne Division, and saw service in Operation Market Garden as second–in–command of the divisional signals. He became separated from his unit whilst trying to link up with 1st Parachute Brigade, who were surrounded at the north end of Arnhem Bridge, and along with three other soldiers spent three days trapped in a small room at the back of a German–occupied house. On managing to leave this building, they split up to cross the river; Deane-Drummond successfully swam to the south bank of the Rhine, but was almost immediately taken prisoner. The next day, he managed to escape from a group who were being escorted out of Arnhem, and spent the next eleven days hiding inside a large cupboard until he felt safe to move.

After leaving his hiding place, Deane-Drummond made contact with the Resistance, and waited two weeks until he was brought back to British lines as part of Operation Pegasus. He was mentioned in despatches for this second escape, and awarded a bar to his Military Cross.

== Post-war service ==
Deane-Drummond attended Staff College, Camberley in 1945, and then became brigade major of 3rd Parachute Brigade, then serving in Palestine during the Palestine Emergency (see 6th Airborne Division in Palestine). In 1949 he was appointed an instructor at the Royal Military Academy, Sandhurst, and in 1952 an instructor at the Staff College.

In November 1957 Deane-Drummond took command of 22 Special Air Service Regiment, which was serving in the Malayan Emergency. He continued to command the unit until 1960, which included its service in Oman. He was awarded the Distinguished Service Order for the regiment's successful assault on Jebel Akhdar in January 1959. The capabilities demonstrated on this extremely arduous operation averted the Army's plans to disband the SAS, which would otherwise have occurred on its return from Malaya.

In 1961, Deane-Drummond was promoted to command 44th Parachute Brigade. In 1963 he returned to Sandhurst as the Assistant Commandant, and in 1966 again took an operational command as General Officer Commanding 3rd Division, and was made Assistant Chief of the Defence Staff for Operations in 1968. From 1966 to 1971 he also held the ceremonial post of colonel commandant of the Royal Signals.

He was the subject of This Is Your Life in 1960 when he was surprised by Eamonn Andrews at the BBC Television Theatre.

In 1971, after retiring for the first time, he was appointed Director and Chief Executive of the Paper and Paper Products Industry Training Board, pursuing this career for the next 8 years.

== Personal life ==
Deane-Drummond was a recreational glider pilot and instructor. When he was at the Royal Military Academy, he moved the Army Gliding Club to Lasham Airfield in 1951. This was instrumental in creating one of the world's largest gliding organisations because Lasham soon consisted of a number of clubs managed by a central organisation and became the largest gliding airfield in the UK and maybe also in Europe..

Tony DD was British National Champion in 1957 and a member of the British Gliding Team in 1958, 1960, 1963 and 1965 at the World Gliding Championships. He published three books (one an autobiography), and restored antique furniture as a hobby.

He married Mary Evangeline Boyd in 1944; they had four daughters.

== Notes ==
Military offices
Preceded by Cecil Blacker	GOC 3rd Division; 1966−1968	Succeeded by Terence McMeekin
