= Airdrop =

Type of airlift

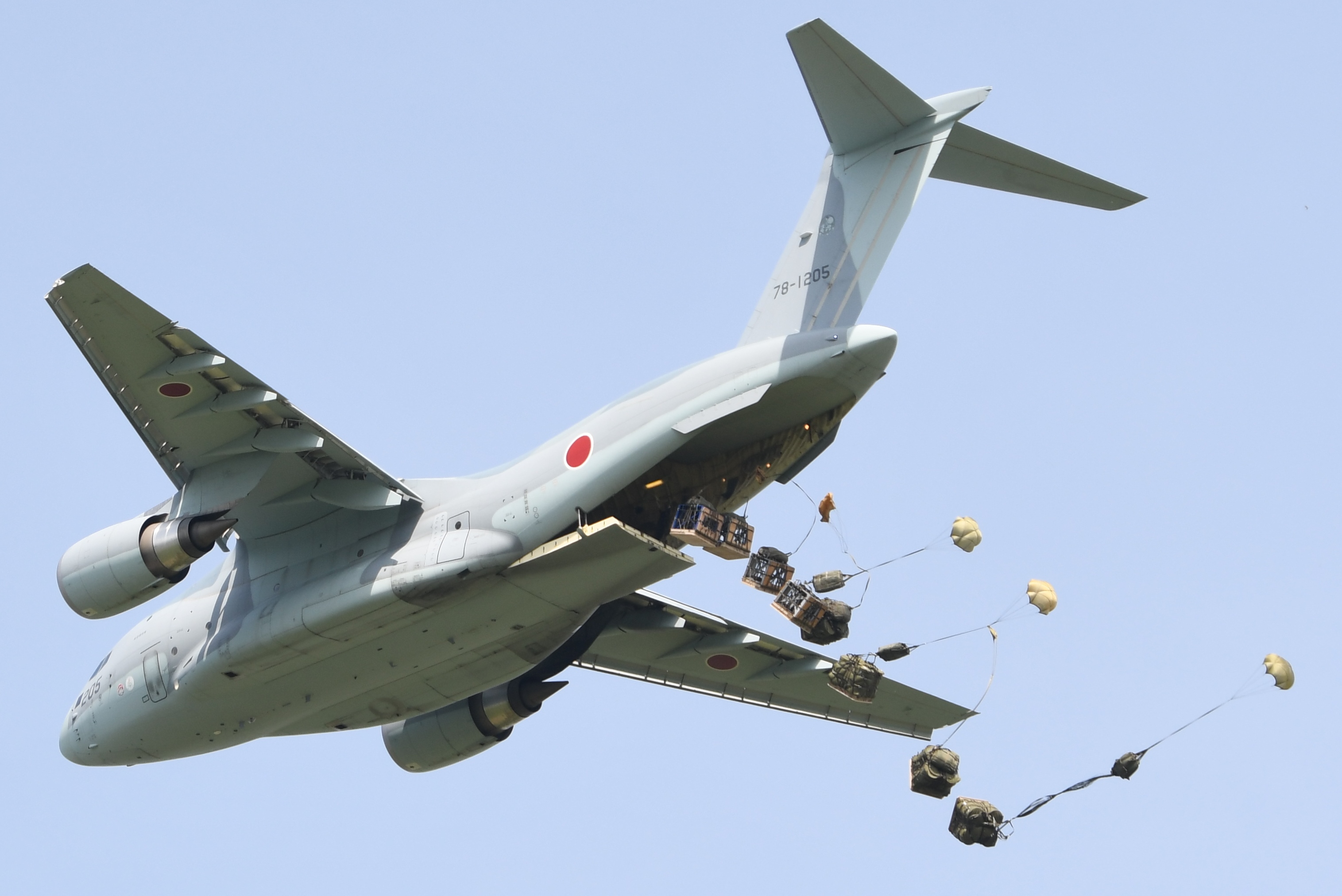
A Kawasaki C-2 military transport aircraft conducting an airdrop demonstration over Miho Air Base, 2018

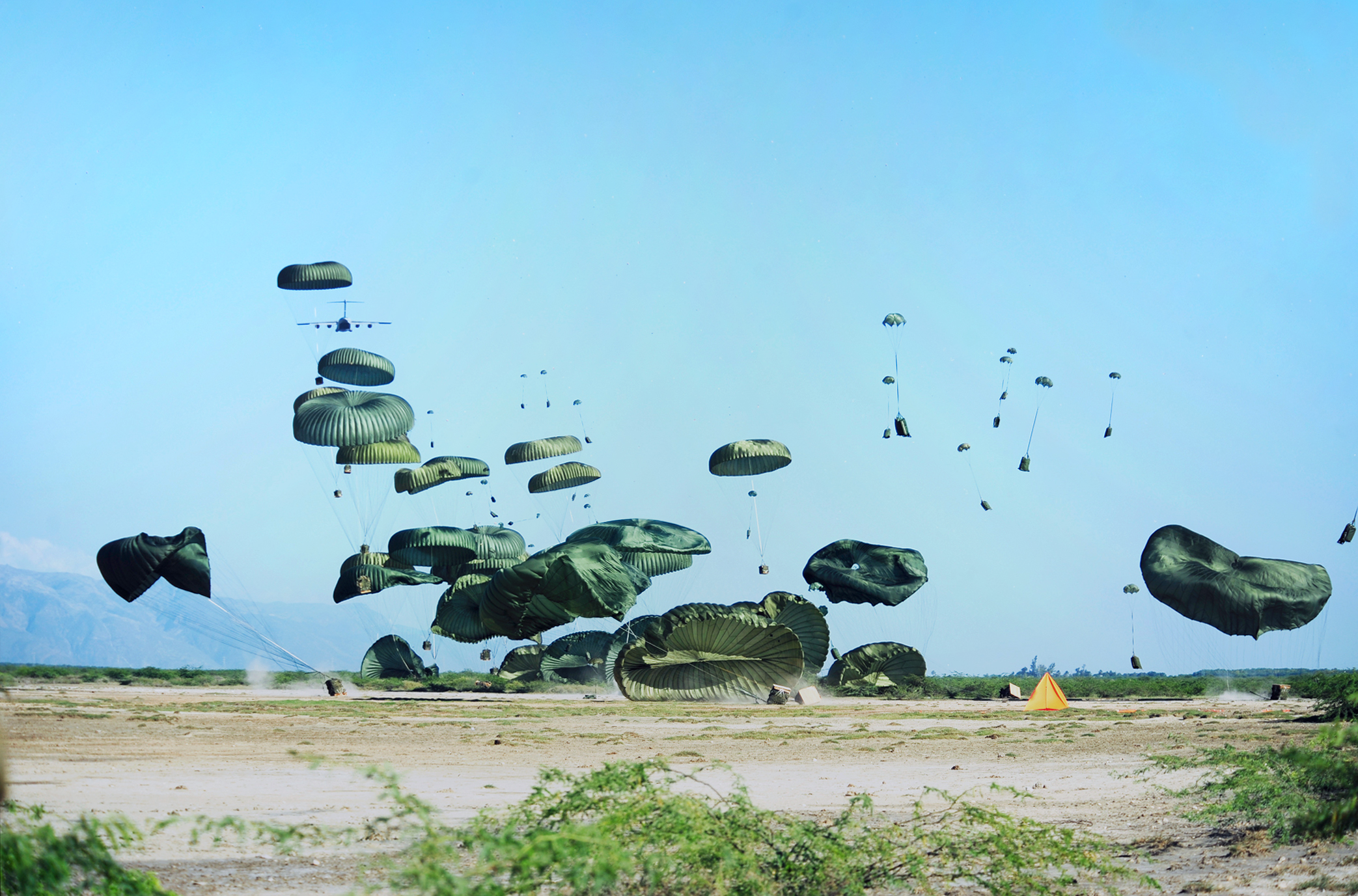
A C-17 Globemaster III airdropping humanitarian aid supplies after the 2010 Haiti earthquake

An airdrop is a type of airlift in which items including weapons, equipment, humanitarian aid or leaflets are delivered by military or civilian aircraft without their landing. Developed during World War II to resupply otherwise inaccessible troops, themselves often airborne forces, airdrops can also refer to the airborne assault itself.

== History ==
Early airdrops were conducted by dropping or pushing padded bundles from aircraft. Later, small crates fitted with parachutes were pushed out of aircraft side cargo doors. Later, cargo aircraft were designed with rear access ramps, lowerable in flight, that allowed large platforms to be rolled out the back.

As aircraft grew larger, the U.S. Air Force and Army developed low-level extraction, allowing vehicles like light tanks, armored personnel carriers, and other large supplies to be delivered. Propaganda leaflets are another commonly airdropped item.

Airdrops evolved to include massive bombs as a payload. The 15,000-pound (6,800 kg) BLU-82, nicknamed the "Daisy Cutter" for its ability to turn a dense forest into a helicopter landing zone in a single blast, was used in the Vietnam War and more recently in Afghanistan. The 22,600-pound (10,250 kg) GBU-43/B, nicknamed the "Mother Of All Bombs", was deployed to the Persian Gulf for the Iraq War. Cargo aircraft like the C-130 or C-17 serve as bombers to deliver these palletized airdropped weapons.

In 2021, the Air Force Research Laboratory successfully demonstrated the Rapid Dragon palletized cruise missile deployment system that is characterized as “a bomb bay in a box” that could allow cargo transport aircraft to act as standoff cruise missile carriers, safely staying out of a threat zone and launching a mass of standoff weapons such as the 500 kg warhead JASSM-ER (925 km (575 mi)), JASSM-XR (1,900 km (1,200 mi)) or JDAM-ER (80 km (50 mi)). The self-contained and disposable launch system can be loaded and deployed like a conventional palletized airdrop before the parachuted module deploys its missiles with preprogramed coordinates or targeting data transmitted from allied units. The module requires no additional training, and the aircraft can resume its mission as a transportation vehicle after the system is launched from the cargo bay.

In peacekeeping and humanitarian operations, food and medical supplies are often airdropped from United Nations and other aircraft.

== Types ==
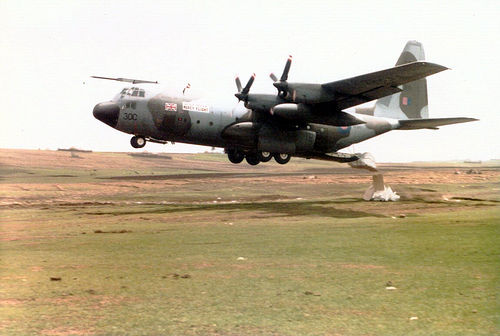
Freedrop packs being airdropped out of a C-130 Hercules

The type of airdrop refers to the way that the airdrop load descends to the ground. There are several types of airdrop, and each may be carried out using different methods.

- Low-Velocity Airdrop is the delivery of a load involving parachutes that are designed to slow the load down as much as possible, ensuring that it impacts the ground with minimal force. This type of airdrop is used for delicate equipment and larger items such as vehicles.
- High-Velocity Airdrop is the delivery of a load involving a parachute meant to stabilize its fall. The parachute will slow the load, though not to the extent of a low-velocity airdrop. High-velocity airdrops are used for durable items like military ready-to-eat meals. The Low-Altitude Parachute Extraction System (LAPES) is a variation of the high-velocity drop in which aircraft come close to carrying out a touch-and-go landing without actually touching the ground, ejecting their load at an extremely low altitude (as shown in the photo below of a C-130 airdropping a tank).
- Free-Fall Airdrop is an airdrop with no parachute at all. A common example of this type of airdrop is the delivery of airborne leaflet propaganda used in psychological warfare or the Triwall Aerial Delivery System (TRIADS).

== Methods ==
The method of airdrop refers to the way the load leaves the aircraft. There are three main airdrop methods currently used in military operations.

- Extraction airdrops use an extraction parachute to pull the load out of the end of the aircraft: the parachute is deployed behind the aircraft, pulling the load out before cargo parachutes slow its descent. Extraction drops are usually low-velocity airdrops, with rare exceptions (e.g. LAPES).
- Manual Extraction airdrops, where the load is physically pushed out of an aircraft by a specially trained crew of up to four people.
- Gravity airdrops use the attitude of the aircraft at time of drop to cause loads to roll out of the plane like a sled down a hill. The most common use of a gravity airdrop is the Container Delivery System (CDS) bundle.
- Door bundle drops are the simplest of airdrop methods: the loadmaster simply pushes out the load at the appropriate time.

Historically, bomber aircraft were often used to drop supplies, using special supply canisters compatible with the aircraft's bomb attachment system. During World War II, German bomber aircraft dropped containers called Versorgungsbomben (provisions bombs) to supply friendly troops on the ground. The British equivalent was the CLE Canister that could carry up to 600 pounds (270 kg) of supplies or weapons. Notably, British and American bombers air-dropped weapons to the Polish Home Army during the Warsaw Uprising in 1944. During the Dutch famine of 1944-1945, British and American bombers dropped food on the Netherlands to feed civilians in danger of starvation; an agreement was made with Germany not to fire on the airdrop aircraft.

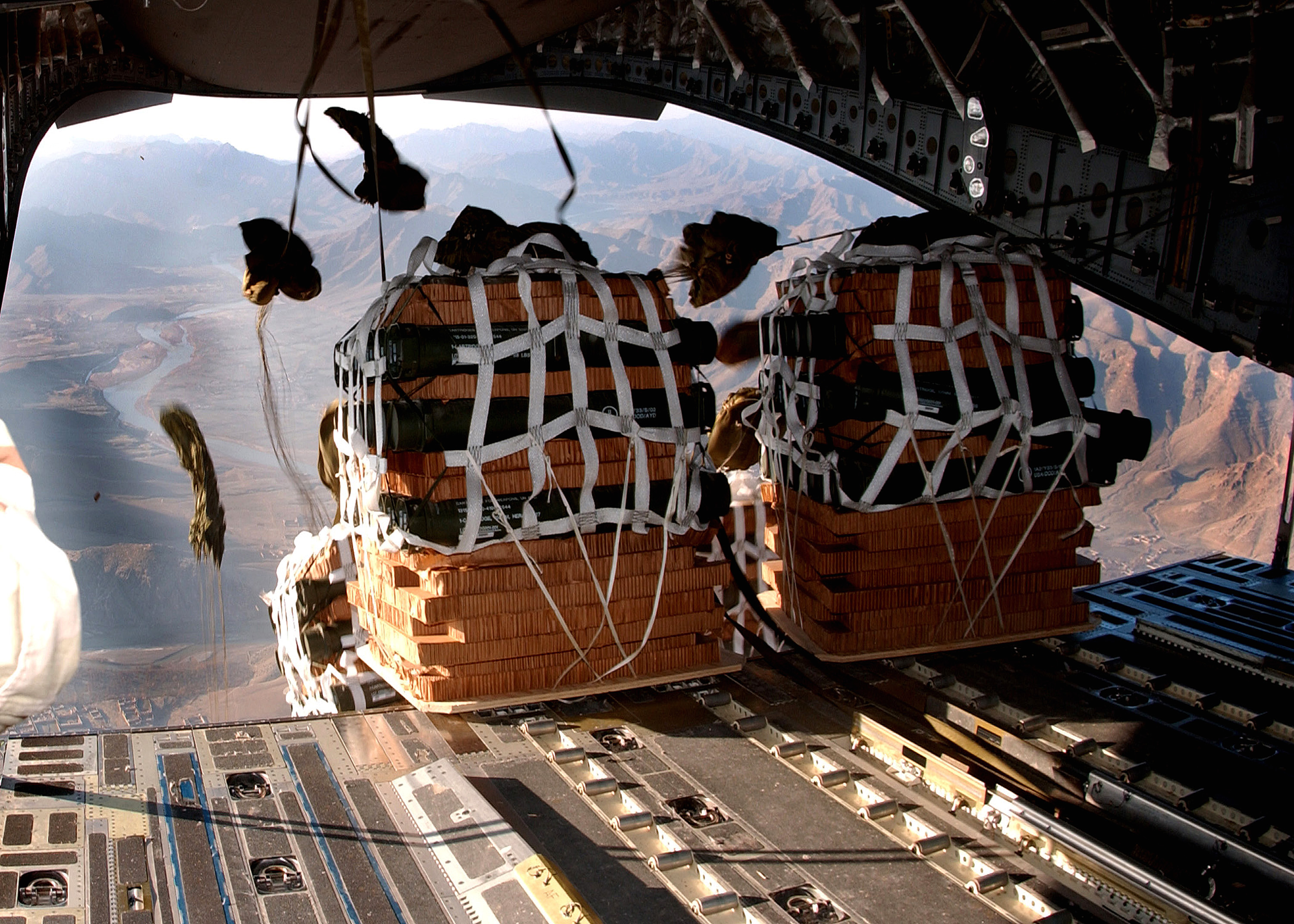
Gravity airdrop of CDS bundles from a C-17

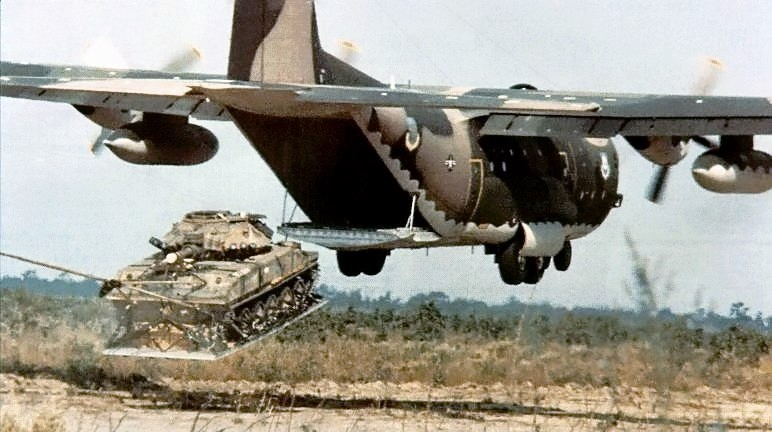
Extraction airdropping a M551 Sheridan light tank

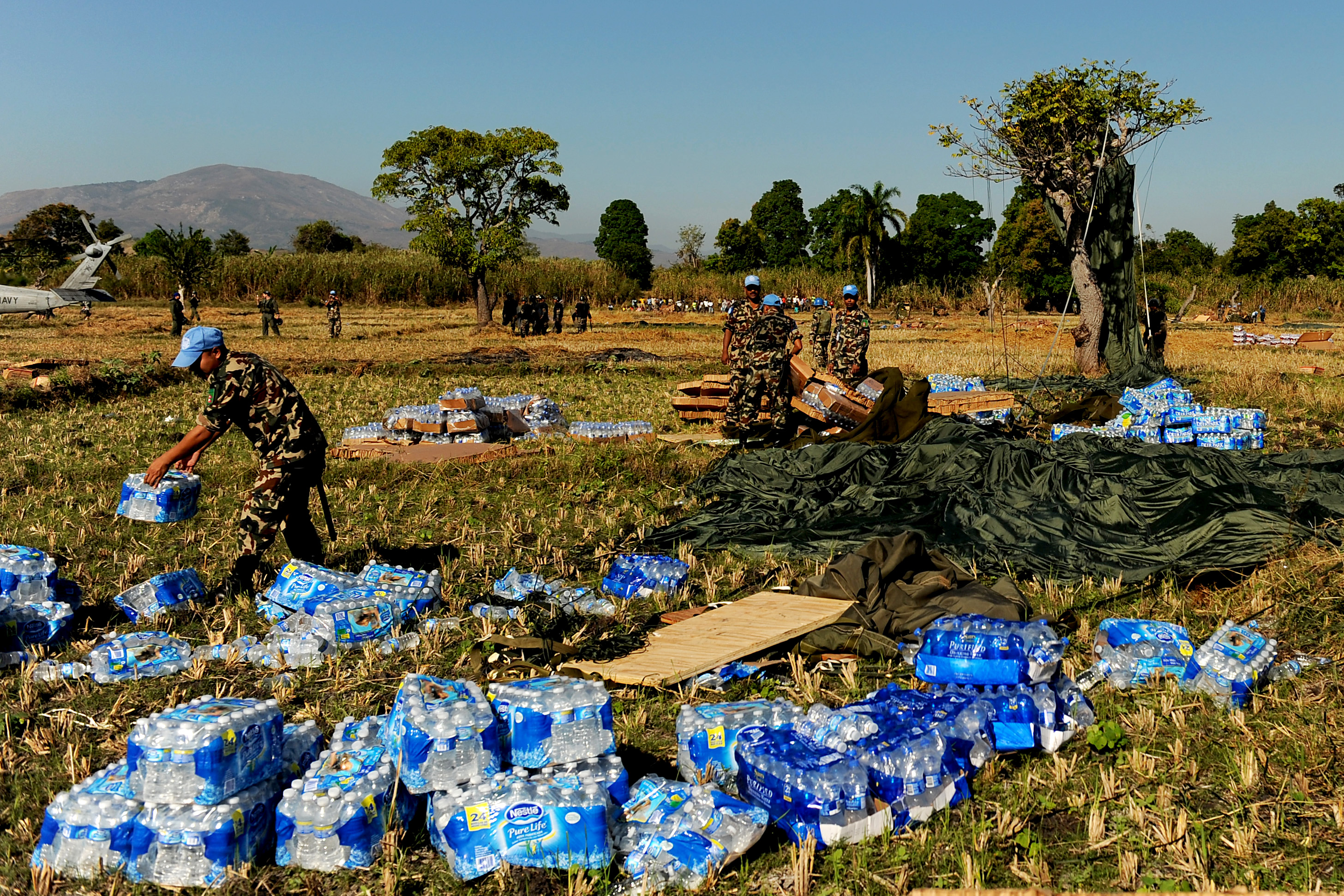
Airdropped humanitarian supplies being recovered in Haiti, 2010

Video of an airdrop of Humvees and paratroopers from inside a C-17 Globemaster III

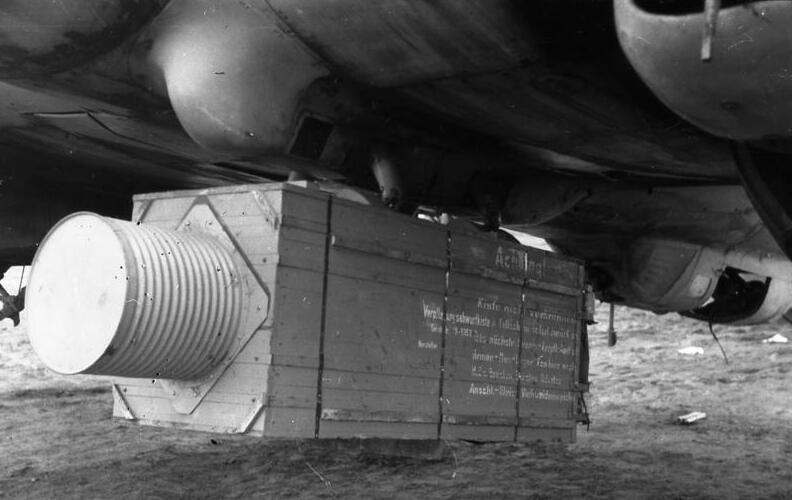
Food supply crate mounted under a German He 111 bomber, 1944

== See also ==
- List of paratrooper forces
- 395 Air Despatch Troop RLC
- Airborne leaflet propaganda
- Airbridge
- Airmail
- Delivery drone
- Joint Precision Airdrop System (JPADS)
- Loadmaster
- Paratrooper
- Winged tank
  - BMD-1 air-drop techniques
