= X Troop =

X Troop may refer to:

- No. 10 (Inter-Allied) Commando#No. 3 Troop ("X" Troop)
- A section from No. 11 Special Air Service Battalion that conducted Operation Colossus
