= 10th Battalion, Parachute Regiment =

Former airborne infantry battalion of the British Army

10th Battalion, The Parachute Regiment
- Cap badge of the Parachute Regiment.
- Active: 1942–1944; 1947−1999
- Country: United Kingdom
- Branch: British Army
- Type: Infantry
- Role: Airborne forces
- Size: Battalion
- Part of: 4th Parachute Brigade
- Nickname: Red Devils
- Mottos: Utrinque Paratus (Latin for "Ready for Anything")

Commanders
- Notable commanders: Kenneth B. I. Smyth; Died of wounds October 1944; Sir John Mogg

Insignia
- DZ Flash

The 10th Battalion, The Parachute Regiment was an airborne infantry battalion of the Parachute Regiment, originally raised as the 10th (Sussex) Battalion by the British Army during the Second World War.

The battalion was raised during the Second World War around volunteers from the Royal Sussex Regiment at Kibrit in the Middle East. Assigned to the 4th Parachute Brigade, they joined the 1st Airborne Division in Tunisia. The battalion fought their first action in Operation Slapstick part of the Allied invasion of Italy. They were then withdrawn to England at the end of 1943. Being held in reserve during the Normandy landings, their second action was in Operation Market Garden in the Netherlands.

The battalion landed on the second day of the Battle of Arnhem and unable to reach their assigned objective, it was gradually destroyed over two days of fighting. The surviving men managed to withdraw into the divisional position at Oosterbeek. After holding a position in the perimeter, the handful of men left were evacuated south of the River Rhine. The battalion never recovered from the heavy casualties, sustained during the battle and was disbanded. The surviving men being posted to the battalions of the 1st Parachute Brigade.

When the Territorial Army was reformed after the war in 1947, a new 10th Battalion was raised. It was part of the reserve 44th Parachute Brigade in the 16th Airborne Division. However, as a result of defence cuts the battalion was eventually amalgamated with the 4th Battalion.

== Background ==
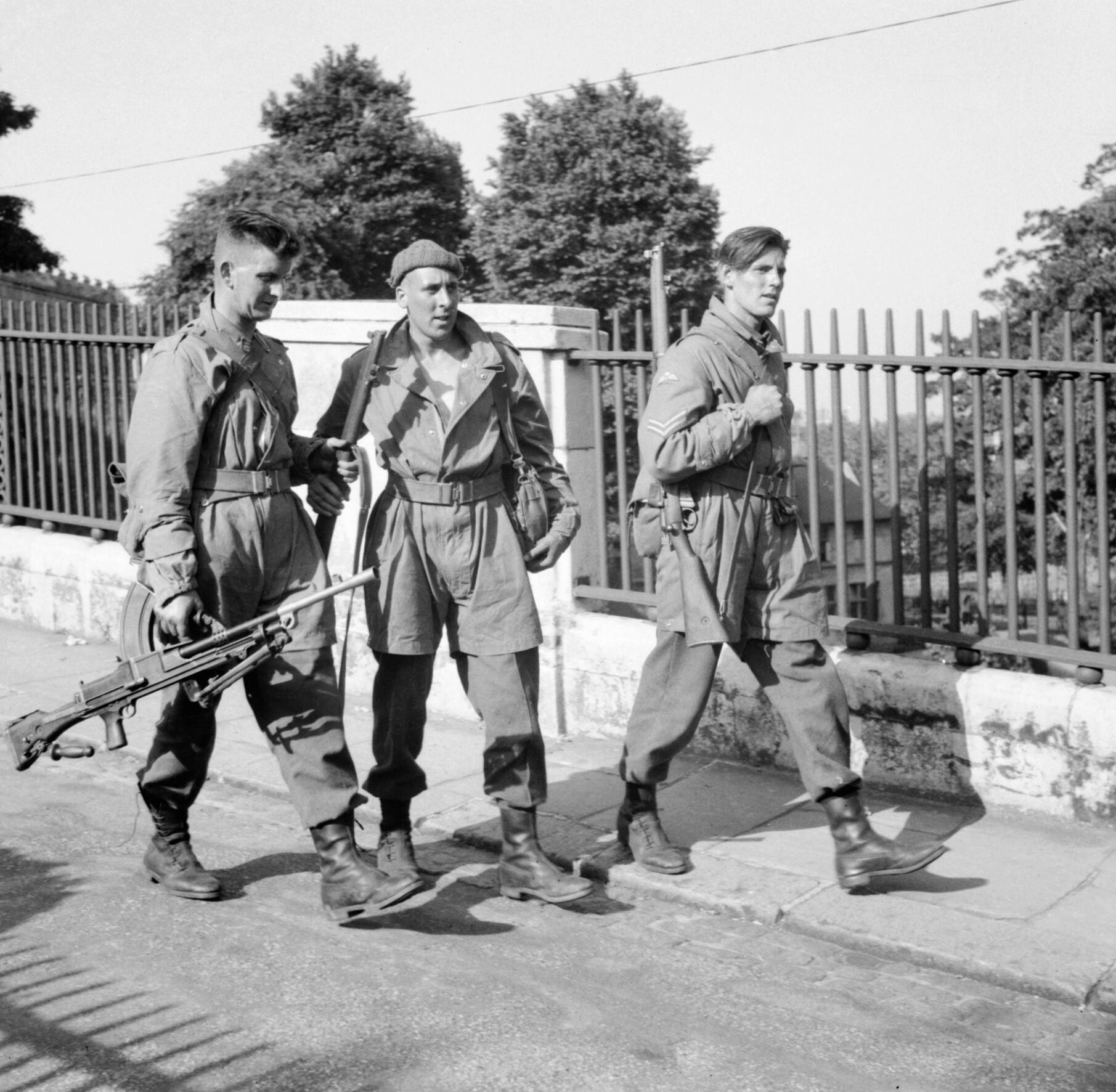
British paratroops wearing 'jump jackets', in Norwich during exercises 23 June 1941

Impressed by the success of German airborne operations, during the Battle of France, the then Prime Minister of the United Kingdom, Winston Churchill, directed the War Office to investigate the possibility of creating a corps of 5,000 parachute troops. The standards set for British airborne troops was extremely high, and from the first group of 3,500 volunteers only 500 men were accepted to go forward to parachute training.

Additionally on 22 June 1940, a British Commando unit, No. 2 Commando was turned over to parachute duties and on 21 November, re-designated the 11th Special Air Service Battalion, with a parachute and glider wing. It was these men who took part in the first British airborne operation, Operation Colossus, on 10 February 1941. The success of the raid prompted the War Office to expand the existing airborne force, setting up the Airborne Forces Depot and Battle School in Derbyshire in April 1942, and creating the Parachute Regiment as well as converting a number of infantry battalions into airborne battalions in August 1942. (Note: In most conversions, the majority of the original battalion either did not wish to become paratroopers, failed medical or other tests. The spaces in the battalion were filled with volunteers from other units.)

=== 10th Parachute Battalion ===
10th Battalion, The Parachute Regiment was formed in Egypt. The battalion was then assigned to the 4th Parachute Brigade, joining the 156th Parachute Battalion. (Note: At this time the third unit in the brigade the 11th Parachute Battalion had not been formed.)

Upon formation, the battalion had an establishment of 556 men in three rifle companies. The companies were divided into a small headquarters and three platoons. The platoons had three Bren machine guns and three 2-inch mortars, one of each per section. The only heavy weapons in the battalion were a 3 inch mortar and a Vickers machine gun platoon. By 1944 a headquarters or support company, was added to the battalion, comprising five platoons: motor transport, signals, mortar, machine-gun and anti-tank. With eight 3 inch mortars, four Vickers machine guns and ten PIAT anti-tank projectors.

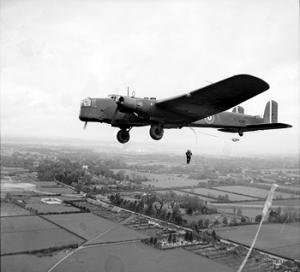
Parachute troops jumping from an Armstrong Whitworth Whitley near Windsor in England.

All members of the battalion had to undergo a parachute training course carried out at No. 2 Parachute Training School at RAF Kirbrit in Egypt. Initial parachute jumps were from a converted barrage balloon and finished with five parachute jumps from an aircraft. (Note: Barrage balloons were used to speed up training jumps and meet the target of 5,000 trained parachutists.) Anyone failing to complete a descent was returned to his old unit. Those men who successfully completed the parachute course, were presented with their maroon beret and parachute wings.

Airborne soldiers were expected to fight against superior numbers of the enemy, armed with heavy weapons, including artillery and tanks. So training was designed to encourage a spirit of self-discipline, self-reliance and aggressiveness. Emphasis was given to physical fitness, marksmanship and fieldcraft. A large part of the training regime consisted of assault courses and route marching. Military exercises included capturing and holding airborne bridgeheads, road or rail bridges and coastal fortifications. At the end of most exercises, the battalion would march back to their barracks. An ability to cover long distances at speed was expected: airborne platoons were required to cover a distance of 50 miles (80 km) in 24 hours, and battalions 32 miles (51 km). (Note: This ability was demonstrated in April 1945. When the 3rd Parachute Brigade advanced 15 miles (24 km) in twenty-four hours, which included eighteen hours of close-quarters fighting. In the same month the 5th Parachute Brigade marched 50 miles (80 km) in seventy-two hours, during which they also carried out two night time assaults.)

== Operations ==
=== Italy ===
On 26 May 1943, the battalion and brigade sailed from Palestine for Tripoli, where it joined the 1st Airborne Division. A shortage of transport aircraft kept the battalion out of the Allied invasion of Sicily. Other units of the division however did take part. The 1st Airlanding Brigade took part in Operation Ladbroke and the 1st Parachute Brigade in Operation Fustian. Both brigades suffered heavy casualties, so that by the time Operation Slapstick was proposed, only the 2nd and 4th Parachute Brigades were up to strength.

Slapstick was in part a deception operation to divert German forces from the main Allied landings and also an attempt to seize intact the Italian ports of Taranto, Bari and Brindisi. The lack of air transport meant that the division's two available brigades had to be transported by sea. They would cross the Mediterranean in four Royal Navy cruisers with their escorts. If the landing was successful, the 78th Infantry Division in Sicily and the 8th Indian Infantry Division in the Middle East, under the command of the V Corps would be sent to reinforce the landings.

The 4th Parachute Brigade only had the 10th and 156th Parachute Battalions available to take part in the landings. On 9 September 1943, the same day as the Salerno landings by the US 5th Army, the battalion having crossed the Mediterranean in HMS Penelope landed at Taranto unopposed. Their first objective was the airfield of Gioia del Colle 30 miles (48 km) inland, was secured on 16 September. However en route to the airfield near the town of Castellaneta, the battalion came up against a German roadblock defended by a Fallschirmjaeger unit of the 1st German Parachute Division. During their assault on the roadblock, the divisional commander Major-General George F. Hopkinson observing the action, was hit by a burst of machine gun fire and killed. At the same time, the 156th Parachute Battalion at San Basilio, carried out a successful flank attack on Fallschirmjaeger defending the town. Two days later, having been only involved in minor skirmishes, the battalion reached Bari and Brindisi. Playing no further part in operations in Italy, the battalion were withdrawn by sea to the United Kingdom, arriving in November 1943.

=== Arnhem ===
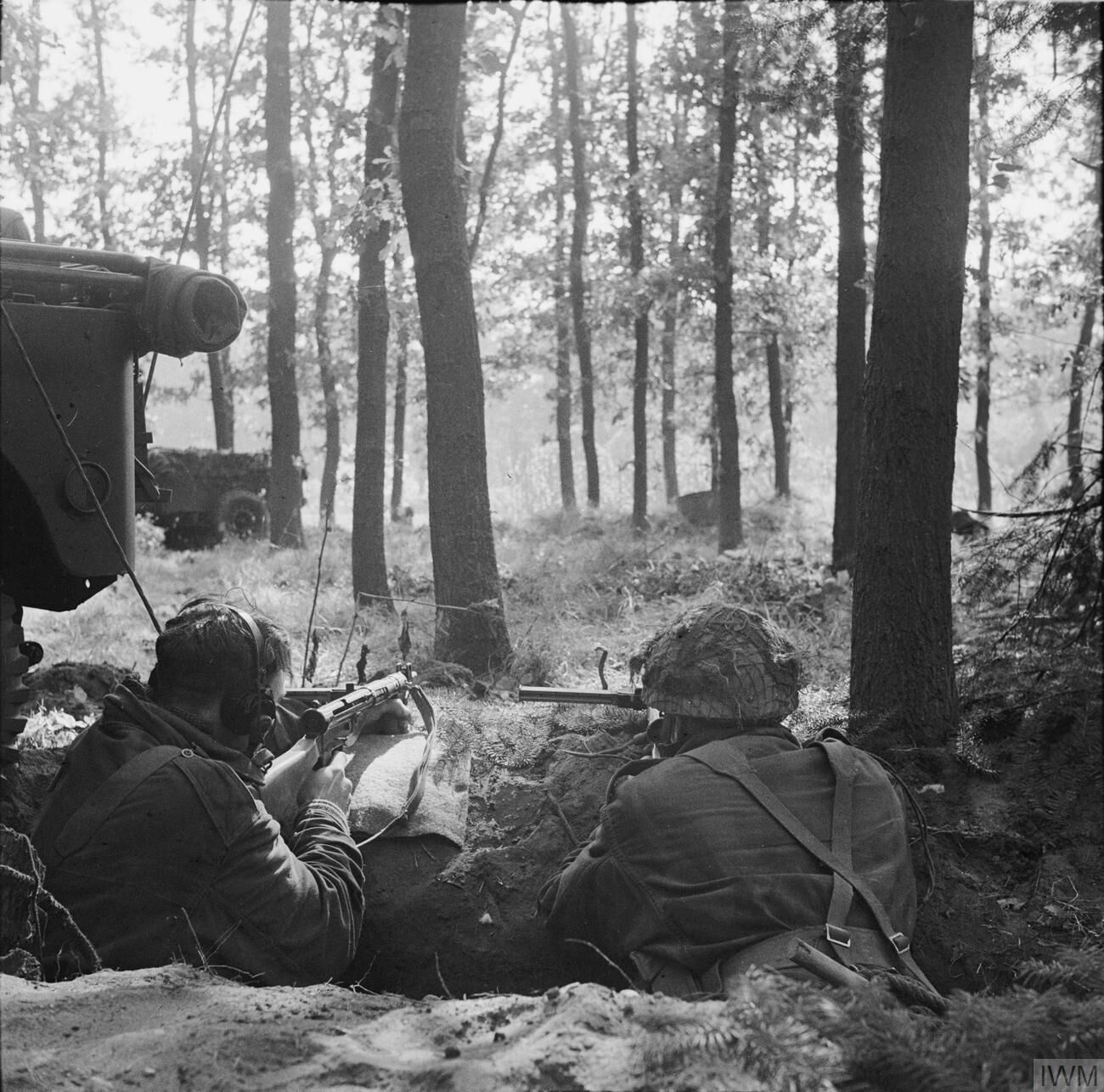
Arnhem 18 September 1944

The 10th Battalion and the rest of the 4th Parachute Brigade landed to the west of Arnhem on the second day of the battle 18 September 1944. Their objective was to hold a position on the high ground north of Arnhem at Koepel. With the 156th Parachute Battalion leading on the right, the 10th Battalion followed slightly behind on the left. By dawn the following day the battalion was just north of the Rotterdam to Arnhem railway line. When they came under attack from German 88 mm guns. Both battalions were ordered to start an assault on the position at 07:00, but after repeated attacks the battalion had got no further forward. The defenders from the 9th SS Panzer Division had been here for two days and were well dug in. Casualties were heavy and brigade headquarters obtained permission to withdraw south of the rail line into Oosterbeek. The battalion started to pull back but found most of their intended new positions already occupied by the Germans and by 15:00 had lost communications with brigade. To cross back over the rail line the battalion first had to capture the crossing point at Wolfheze. Just before the attack a diversion was provided by the arrival of the 1st Polish Parachute Brigades gliders. Unaware the landing-zones had been captured or were under fire 10 percent of the Poles were killed during the landings. The battalion withdrew remaining in contact with the advancing German tanks and infantry and under mortar fire. Part of the rearguard left behind was commanded by Captain Lionel Queripel who was awarded a posthumous Victoria Cross for his actions during the withdrawal. As the battalion left the woods they moved onto the open ground of landing-zone L, occupied by the Poles who had just landed. In the confusion both sides open fire on each other, at the same time coming under fire from the following Germans. The battalion headed towards Wolfheze and prepared to defend the village assisted by 'B' and 'Support' Companies, 156th Parachute Battalion which had become separated from their battalion.

Casualties had continued to mount and by 20 September the German tactics were to bombard the British positions with tank and mortar fire. The remnants of the battalion were withdrawn into the perimeter formed by the division around Oosterbeek. Only 60 men were able to continue fighting and this small force were given a position on the north eastern side to defend. One of them was the commanding officer Lieutenant-Colonel Ken Smyth who although wounded remained with the battalion. By 21 September pressure from the German attacks had squeezed the perimeter to less than 1,000 yards (910 m) across. A German self propelled gun now drove up and down the battalions position, shooting high explosive shells into any buildings they believed to be defended. The battalion having expended all its anti-tank ammunition were unable to do anything to stop the gun. The gun was followed up by infantry who fighting at close quarters forced the battalion out of their defensive positions. All the battalions surviving officers were killed or wounded during this attack and the battalion was in danger of being overrun. However, small isolated units managed to hold out until reinforced by the Pathfinders of the 21st Independent Parachute Company. On 22 September the bulk of the 1st Polish Parachute Brigade were dropped south of the river. This drew off some of the Germans from around the divisional perimeter to confront the new threat. The defenders now had to cope with over 100 German artillery guns firing onto their positions.

By 23 September the battalions position was subjected to constant mortar and artillery fire and incursions by tanks and infantry were becoming more and more frequent. Casualties forced a contraction of the perimeter but first the Germans had to be evicted from the houses behind them which they were to occupy.

On 24 September the decision was made by Lieutenant-General Horrocks commander XXX Corps to withdraw what was left of the division south of the Rhine. The remnants of the battalion were evacuated over the night of 25/26 September. The casualties sustained were never replaced and the battalion was disbanded after the battle.

Of the 582 men of the battalion who landed on 18 September, 92 were killed, 404 became prisoners of War and 96 were evacuated.

During preparations for Operation Market Garden the battalion was billeted in and around Somerby before setting off to join the operation. The 10th Battalion, The Parachute Regiment Memorial at Burrough on the Hill was completed and unveiled in September 2019 by Friends of the Tenth. A memorial garden has also been created looking over and across to the valley where the battalion practised parachute drops and training exercises in the summer of 1944.

== Territorial Army ==
The 10th Battalion was disbanded in November 1945, but when the Territorial Army was reformed in 1947, a new reserve Parachute Regiment battalion now called the 10th (City of London) Parachute Battalion (Territorial Army) was raised. Re-designated 10 PARA (Volunteer) in 1967, the battalion existed until it was disbanded in 1999. For a time the battalion was represented by 10 (London) Company, 4th Battalion, Parachute Regiment however this was later renamed B company when the 4th Battalion moved from using numbers to letters for company names. Unit locations prior to disbanding were: HQ Coy – Chelsea, 1 Coy – White City, 2 Coy – Croydon and Blackheath, 3 Coy – Finchley, 4 Coy – Chelsea, 5 (HSF) Coy – Chelsea, Support Coy – Aldershot (Machine Gun Pl and Antitank Pl), 2nd Anti-Tank Pln – Portsmouth (Briefly), Mortar Pln – Leigh-on-Sea.

10 Para took part in many overseas exercises, including Germany, Holland, USA, Gibraltar, Cyprus, Norway, and took part in "S type" secondments within regular parachute battalions. In 1995 volunteers joined the 2nd Battalion The Light Infantry, an armored infantry formation, on "S type" secondment for active service in Bosnia on Op Grapple 7 (UNPROFOR) and subsequently Op Resolute (NATO). In the early 1990s, selected 10 Para men also took part in trials of the new low level parachute, and laser rangefinders. The Battalion also formed part of the 5th Airborne Brigade, with greater training emphasis being placed on CQB, FIBUA, additional night jumps, and support roles in hostage rescue, and evacuation.

Each year, to remember Operation Market Garden, men from 10 Para would parachute from RAF Hercules aircraft onto Ginkel Heath near Arnhem. On landing the paras would be met by hundreds of Dutch well wishers, school children, and veterans to remember the events of 1944. On the Sunday, they would attend an open-air service at the Oosterbeek Cemetery, often attended by the Dutch Royal family, and key veterans, like retired Major General John Frost.

Actor Lewis Collins was a member of the 10th Battalion during his time filming The Professionals. His character on the show had previously been a member of the Parachute Regiment.

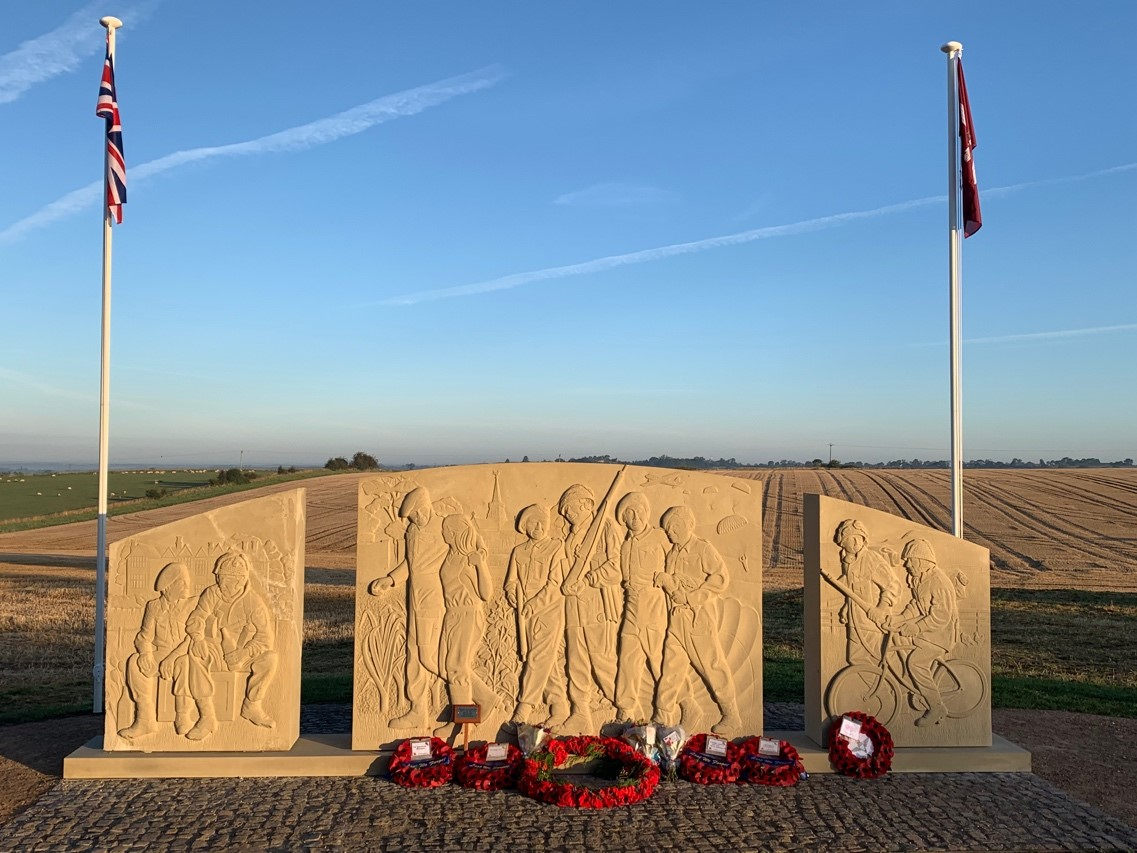
The 10th Battalion, Parachute Regiment Memorial at Burrough on the Hill

== Notes ==
Footnotes

Citations
