= 151 Regiment RLC =

- Active: 1967-present
- Country: United Kingdom
- Branch: British Army
- Role: Logistics
- Size: Regiment; 434 personnel
- Part of: Royal Logistic Corps
- Website: https://www.army.mod.uk/who-we-are/corps-regiments-and-units/royal-logistic-corps/rlc-reserve-units/151-regiment-rlc/

151 Regiment RLC is a regiment of the British Army's Royal Logistic Corps. It is currently under Army Reserve control.

== History ==
The regiment was formed in the Royal Corps of Transport in 1967 as 151 (Greater London) Transport Regiment, from three territorial transport regiments and consisted of one ambulance squadron, one tank-transporter squadron, one transport squadron, and a parachute sub-unit, 562 Parachute Squadron Royal Corps of Transport (Volunteers). The parachute squadron was redesignated as a general transport squadron in 1978. The regiment was transferred into the Royal Logistic Corps in 1993, and 215 Squadron was disbanded. In 1999, the independent 124 Petroleum Squadron was absorbed.

== Structure ==
The regiment's structure is:

- Regimental Headquarters, in Croydon
- 508 (HQ) Squadron, in Croydon
- 124 Transport Squadron, in Warley
  - B Troop, in Maidstone
- 210 Transport Squadron, in Sutton
- 240 Transport Squadron, in Barnet
- 562 Transport Squadron, in Southall
  - G Troop, in Aldershot Garrison
- 871 Transport Squadron, in Marlow, Buckinghamshire
