= Joint Precision Airdrop System =

American military airdrop system

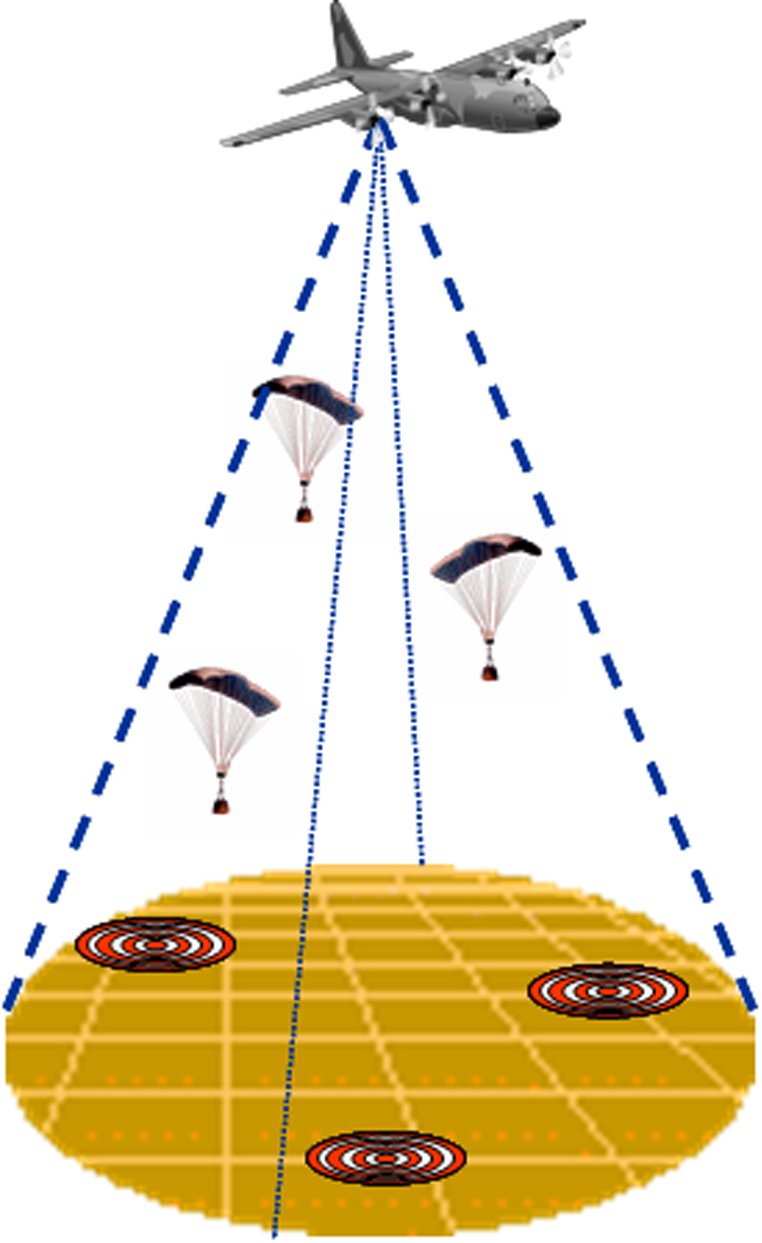
Illustration of how multiple airdrops with multiple drop zones, given they are within 25 miles of each other, can be accomplished at once using JPADS

The Joint Precision Airdrop System (JPADS) is an American military airdrop system which uses the Global Positioning System (GPS), steerable parachutes, and an onboard computer to steer loads to a designated point of impact (PI) on a drop zone (DZ). The JPADS family of systems consists of several precision airdrop systems, ranging from extra light to heavy payloads. JPADS is used in conjunction with mission planning software that resides on a laptop. The function of this mission planning software includes computing release points, weather forecasting, acquiring measurements of wind velocity, altitude, air pressure, and temperature. It can also receive weather updates and en route mission changes through satellite links.

== History ==
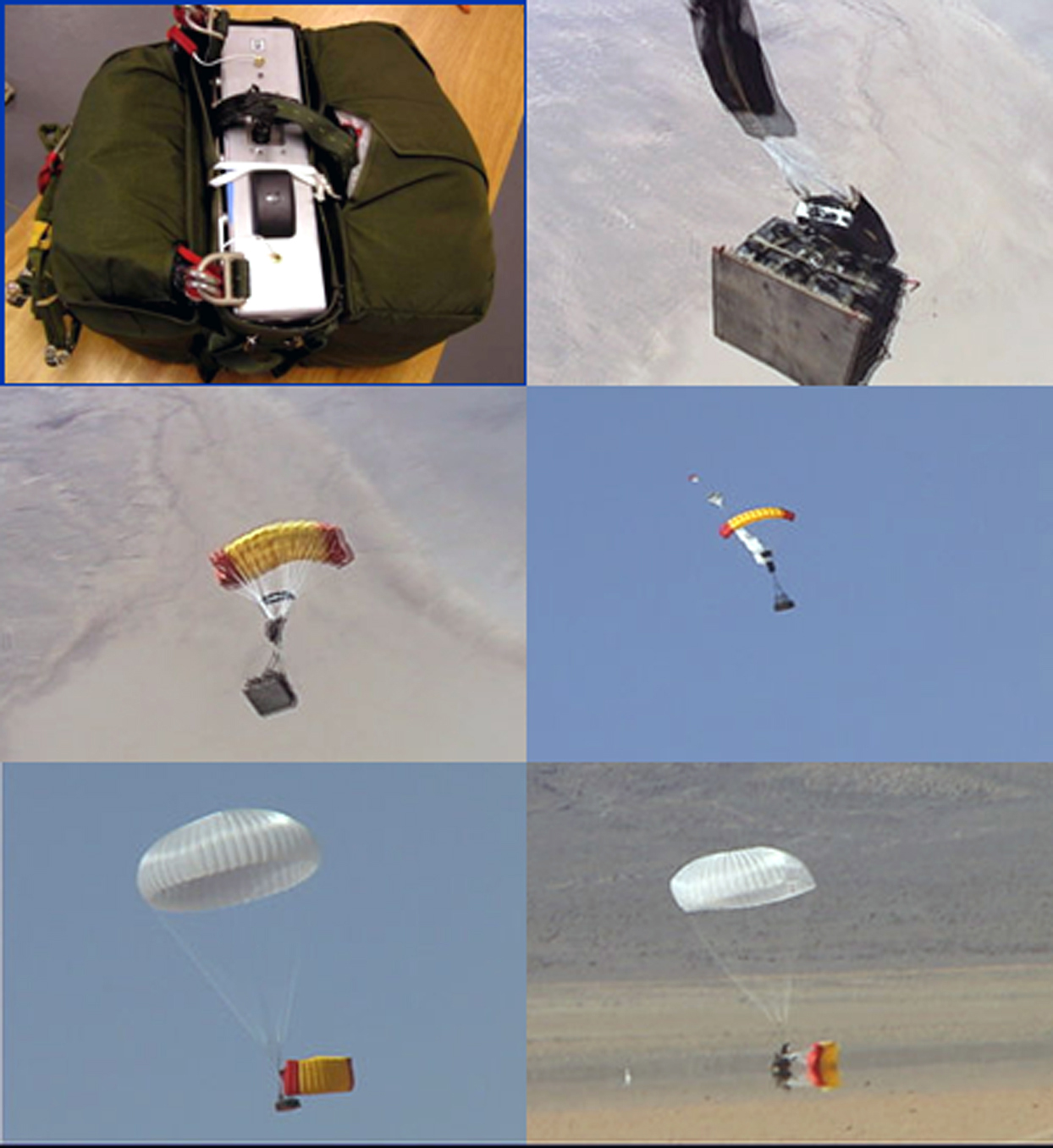
Early JPADS equipment testing

U.S. Army Research, Development and Engineering Command (RDECOM) was the primary developer for JPADS, which meets several requirements: increased ground accuracy, standoff delivery, increased air carrier survivability, and improved effectiveness/assessment feedback regarding airdrop mission operations. The U.S. Army and U.S. Air Force began jointly developing this system in 1993. The U.S. Air Force made its first operational/combat use of the system in Afghanistan in 2006.

== Operation ==
U.S. Marine Corps JPADS Training (1:09)
U.S. Marines conduct JPADS training during the WTI course at the Yuma Proving Ground's Yuma Test Center

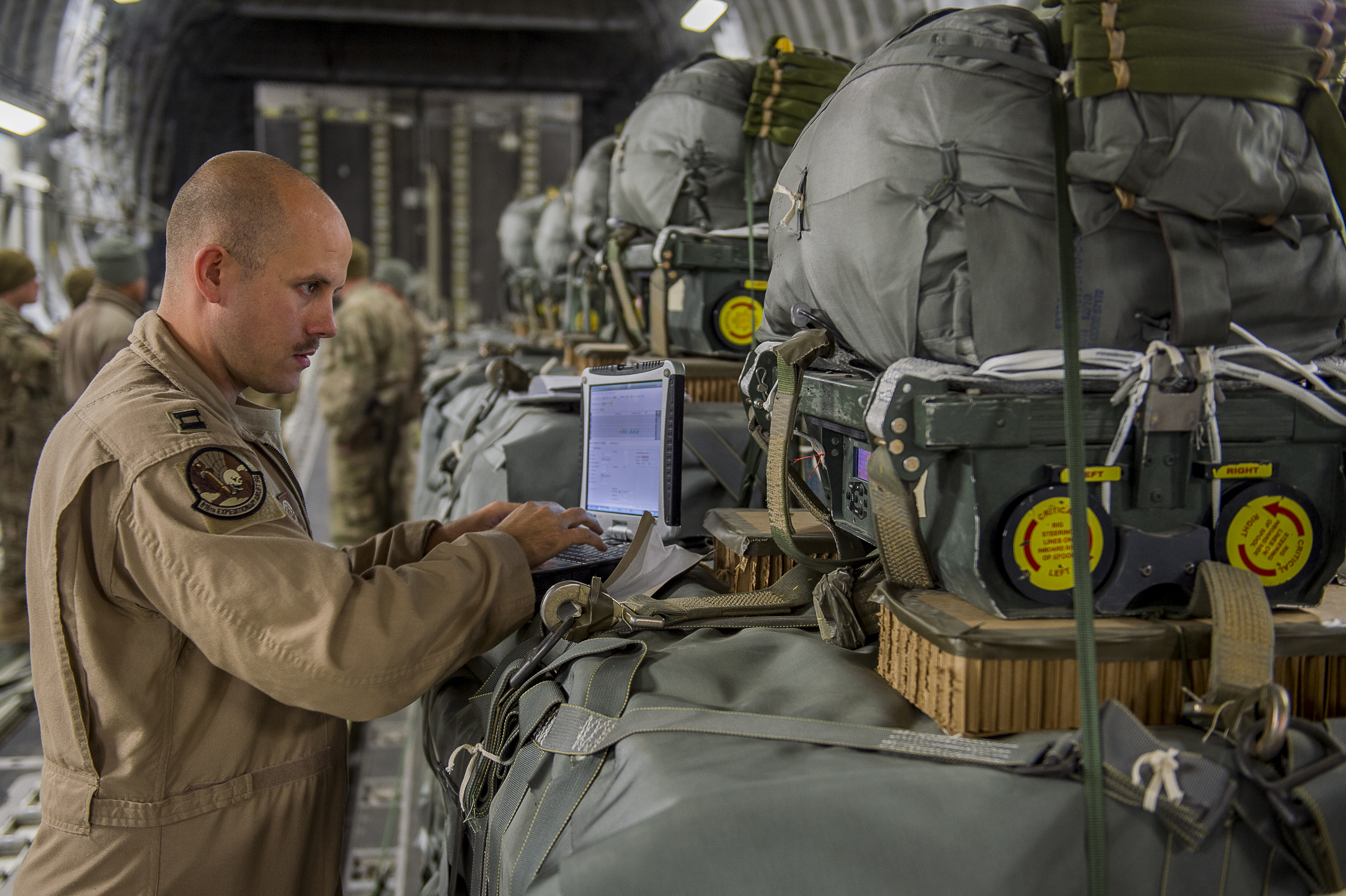
An officer programs a JPADS bundle with drop coordinates in preparation for a resupply mission

The steerable parachute or parafoil is called a "decelerator," and gives the JPADS system directional control throughout its descent by means of decelerator steering lines attached to the Autonomous Guidance Unit (AGU). They create drag on either side of the decelerator, which turns the parachute, thus achieving directional control.

The AGU contains a GPS, a battery pack, and the guidance, navigation and control (GN&C) software package. It also houses the hardware required to operate the steering lines. The AGU obtains its position prior to exiting the aircraft, and continues to calculate its position via the GPS throughout descent.

The Mission Planner software gives the aircrew the ability to plan the mission, in flight if necessary, as well as steer the aircraft to its Computed Air Release Point (CARP), where the load is released.

=== Increments ===
JPADS involves four increments, categorized by the weight of the cargo to be dropped:

Increment I: JPADS-2K / applies to loads up to 2,200 lb / classified as the “extra light” category / commensurate with Container Delivery System (CDS) bundles.

Increment II: JPADS-10K / applies to loads up to 10,000 lb.

Increment III: JPADS-30K / applies to loads up to 30,000 lb.

Increment IV: JPADS-60K / applies to loads up to 60,000 lb.

== Accuracy ==
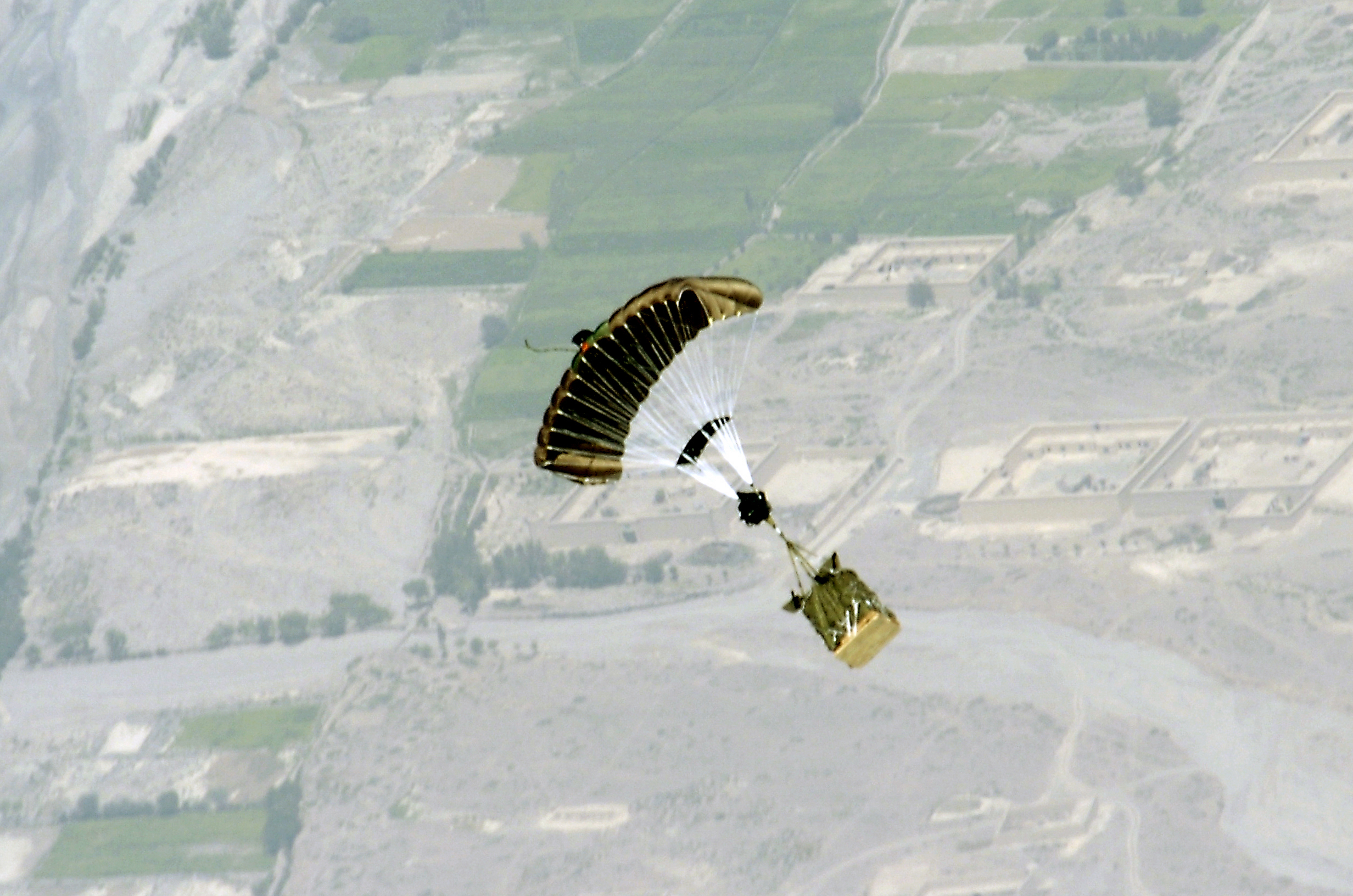
JPADS bundle descends to its preprogramed drop zone over Afghanistan, c. 2006

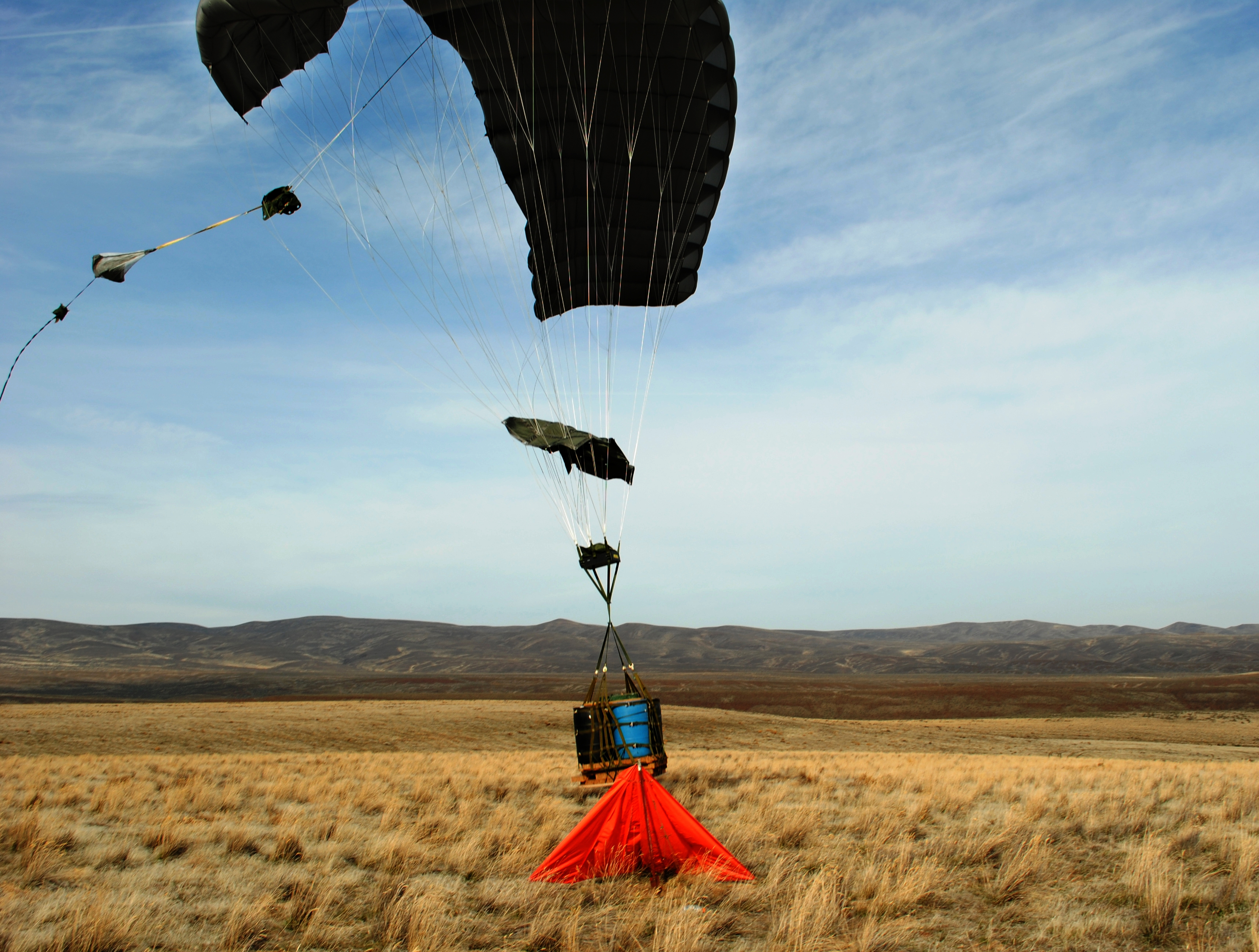
A JPADS guided bundle lands right next to its programmed target, indicated by the red marker

JPADS is reported to be accurate to 50–75 metres (164–246 ft), drastically reduces drop zone size requirements; significantly increasing the number of locations which can be used as a drop zone. This reduces both the risk of hostile fire to aircraft and aircrews and the amount of cargo that misses a drop zone.

== Benefits ==
JPADS offers several main benefits, including an increase in the number of available drop zones and an increase in the cargo's precision, which benefits the user. JPADS also increases the survivability of the delivery aircraft and its crew.

=== Ground Accuracy ===
Current drop zones are quite large; 600 yd (549 m) or more. Airdropping sequential loads (multiple loads aboard a single aircraft) requires very long drop zones on the order of 0.5 mi (0.8 km) or more, or else the aircraft must make multiple passes over the same area, a tactically unsound thing to do. Furthermore, achieving a high degree of accuracy (less than 100 yd (91 m)) requires the aircraft to fly at the lowest altitude possible, which can range from 400 ft (122 m) above ground level to as high as 1,500 ft (457 m), depending on the altitude of the drop zone, the weight of the load, and the number and type of parachutes required.

JPADs can achieve the same or better accuracy from greater heights, allowing the aircraft to drop the load at a much higher, and usually safer, altitude.

=== Standoff Delivery ===
Because JPADS allows the aircraft to drop at high-altitude, the aircraft can actually drop the load a good distance away from the drop zone, which affords the aircrew to remain free of enemy threats which may be near the area where the load is being dropped.

=== Survivability ===
Airdrops are usually performed at slow speeds for an aircraft, usually 130 kts for paratroopers and 140 kts for cargo. When combined with the low altitude required for precision, the aircraft are vulnerable to enemy ground fire. With JPADS, the aircraft is much more likely to survive, as it can drop at a much higher altitude, above most enemy ground fire.

=== Feedback ===
Because the system can transmit its current position back to the airdrop aircraft, it provides its exact landing location which the aircrew can then transmit to ground forces which may not have arrived at the drop zone.

== See also ==
- Delivery drone
- Loadmaster
- Pathfinder (military)
- Airborne forces
- Paratrooper
- Static line
- High-altitude military parachuting
