= 44th Parachute Brigade =

British Army

44th Parachute Brigade was a British Army Territorial Army parachute brigade, active from c.1950 to 1978.

== History ==
=== Formation ===
From 1950-1956 it was one of the brigades of 16th Airborne Division. From 1956 the division was reduced to the 44th Independent Parachute Brigade Group, comprising the 10th (County of London), 12th (Yorkshire), 13th (Lancashire), 15th (Scottish) and 17th (Durham Light Infantry) battalions of the Parachute Regiment. Shortly after formation, the 12th and 13th Battalions were amalgamated as 12th/13th (Yorkshire and Lancashire) Battalion. In 1967, the TA battalions were reduced again, the 12th/13th and 17th being amalgamated to reform the 4th Battalion.

=== Reformation in 1967 ===
It was re-formed on 1 April 1967 from 44th Independent Parachute Brigade Group (T.A.). The brigade was the only Territorial Army Parachute formation in the Army's order of battle. The following units were part of the brigade:

- Brigade Headquarters and Defence Platoon - based in Chelsea, London
- 289 Parachute Battery, Royal Horse Artillery (Volunteers) located in East Ham, London, (This was the former 289 Parachute Regiment, Royal Horse Artillery (T.A.), which had been composed of 'P','Q','R' and 'S' batteries). (This Battery left the brigade in 1977 when it converted to 289 Commando Battery, Royal Artillery)
- 131 Independent Parachute Squadron, Royal Engineers (Volunteers) - Squadron HQ in London with Troops in Birmingham, Hull and Grangemouth (In 1978 this became 131 Independent Commando Squadron (V) Royal Engineers)
- 44 Parachute Brigade Signal Troop, Royal Corps of Signals (Volunteers) - Based in Chelsea with the brigade HQ.
- 4th Battalion, Parachute Regiment (V) - Battalion HQ in Pudsey with Rifle Companies in Liverpool, Oldham, Gateshead and Norton.
- 10th (County of London) Battalion, Parachute Regiment - Battalion HQ in White City (West London) with Rifle Companies in White City, Finchley, Blackheath, Croydon and Aldershot
- 15th (Scottish) Parachute, Parachute Regiment - Battalion HQ in Glasgow with Companies in Glasgow, Aberdeen and Edinburgh
- 16th (Volunteer) Independent Company, Parachute Regiment - Lincoln
- 562 Parachute Squadron Royal Corps of Transport (Volunteers) - Southall with detachments A Troop at West Ham and B Troop in Dulwich.
- 144 Parachute Field Ambulance, Royal Army Medical Corps (Volunteers) - HQ was in Chelsea, London with detachments in Nottingham, Glasgow and Cardiff
- 44 Parachute Ordnance Field Park, Royal Army Ordnance Corps (Volunteers) - located at Heston in West London.
- 1 Parachute Provost Platoon, Royal Military Police (Volunteers) - located at Tulse Hill in South London.

The 44th Parachute Brigade (V) was disbanded on 31 March 1978. Only the 3 TA Parachute Battalions and 144 Field Ambulance remained as para units; 289 Battery RHA and 131 Squadron RE were converted to Commando units (289 reverting from RHA to RA) but retained their parachute role, while the remainder of the brigade units were either converted or disbanded.
