= 395 Air Despatch Troop RLC =

395 Air Despatch Troop
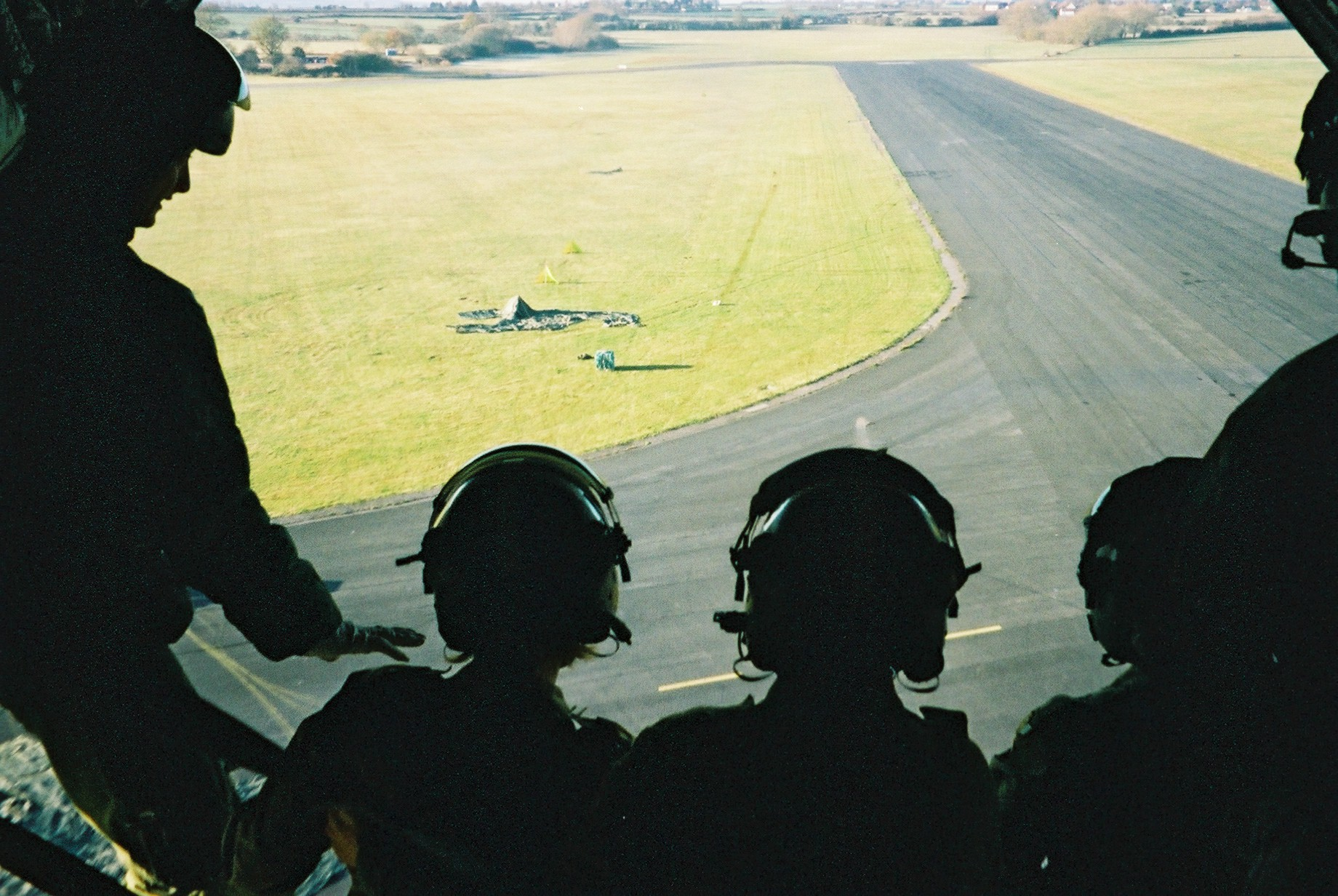
- 395 Air Despatch Troop despatches a free drop (a simple bagged load with no parachute) onto Keevil Airfield Drop Zone
- Active: 1967–2014
- Country: United Kingdom
- Branch: Royal Logistic Corps

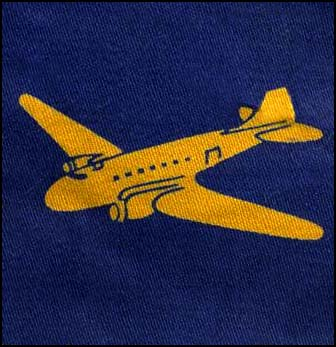
The Golden Dakota awarded by King George VI for the "Good work done in the skies over Arnhem" and worn as a patch or Drop Zone flash by all British Army Air Despatch Units.

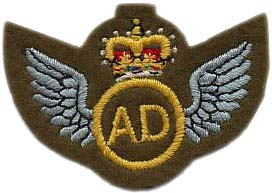
The Air Despatch brevet awarded to Air Despatchers after completion of 20 Air Despatch sorties

395 (Parachute) Air Despatch Troop, later 395 Air Despatch Troop, was the single Army Reserve Air Dispatch Troop of the British Army from its formation 1967 to its disbandment in 2014. It was part of the Royal Corps of Transport from 1967 to 1993 and then part of the Royal Logistic Corps from 1993 to 2014.

During its existence 395 Air Despatch Troop functioned in tandem with the transport aircraft of the Royal Air Force and consisted of seven Air Despatch Crews which were responsible for the receipt of vital or specialist stores, preparing them for air drop, loading them onto aircraft and then despatching them from aircraft during flight. Unlike Regular Army Air Despatch Troops in the British Army, 395 Air Despatch Troop also functioned as a Parachute Troop for some of its existence providing a formal capability to deploy by parachute and then to establish and operate parachute dropping zones.

British military parachute wings awarded upon completion of the Basic Parachute Course, which in 395 Troop followed P Company or another arduous pre-selection course.

The unit was formed as 395 (Para) Air Dispatch Troop based in Hackbridge as part of 562 Parachute Squadron Royal Corps of Transport. In 1971 it was transferred to 245 Transport Squadron, 155 Regiment Royal Corps of Transport (Volunteers) based at Speedwell in Bristol to make travelling to and training at RAF Lyneham less time-consuming. The Troop continued to support 44th Parachute Brigade in this capacity until the brigade was disbanded in 1978 and later it became a task troop of 47 Air Despatch Squadron—firstly in 29 Regiment RLC, and then in 13 Air Assault Regiment RLC as a part of the logistic component of 16 Air Assault Brigade. The Troop was based at RAF Lyneham and then RAF Brize Norton as part of 47 Air Despatch Squadron.

Whilst some soldiers directly joined 395 Air Despatch Troop as reserve soldiers, many transferred from other units including a number of former regular soldiers who had served in 47 Air Despatch Squadron, which is where the Regular Army Officers and Soldiers in the Troop were also drawn from. This allowed the Troops collective Air Despatch technical skills to be maintained at a good level and to be supplemented by the skills bought by other transferees, many of whom transferred from the infantry.

395 Air Despatch Troop Officers were Regular and Territorial Army Officers. There were usually also several Warrant Officers and more Senior Non Commissioned Officers in the Troop than in a Regular Army Troop.

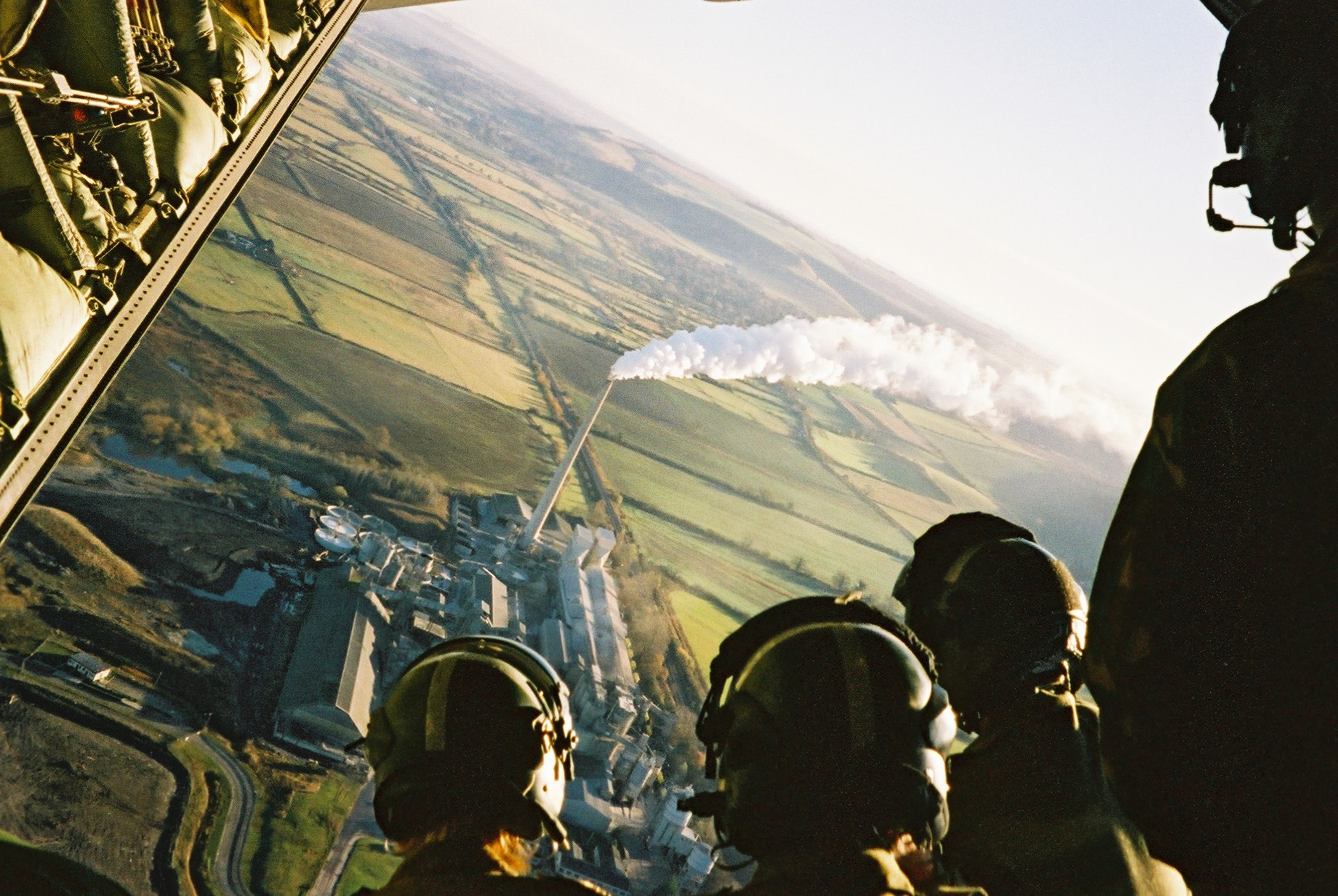
An Air Despatch crew from 395 Air Despatch Troop prepares for an airdrop on the tailgate of a C130K Hercules aircraft during a routine training exercise

The selection and training for 395 Air Despatch Troop was broad and varied over time. As potential aircrew, those who wished to become Air Despatchers in the Troop needed to pass aircrew medicals and some applicants were not suited to the complex (when compared to other basic army training) nature of Air Despatch technical training. Both of these factors permanently reduced the Troops intake.

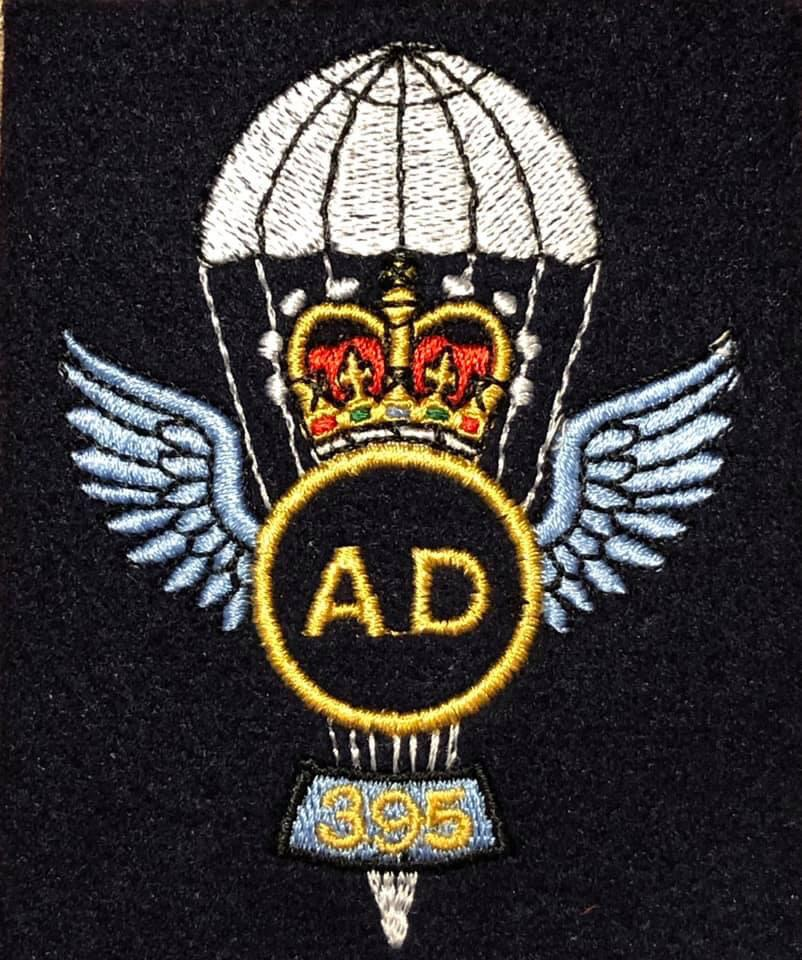
395 Air Despatch Troop Flying Suit Badge

Beyond standard military and Air Despatch technical training, other training included the following, depending on the role which individuals carried out:

- Driving military lorries, cranes, fork lifts etc. for transporting, air loading and recovering air dropped stores (similar to the Regular Army's Driver Air Despatcher trade)
- Operating Drop Zones
- Sea Survival
- Resistance to Interrogation
- Military Parachuting (initially the entire troop and later the Parachute Section)
- Helicopter Handling (As Instructors and as Landing Point Commanders)

The Troop also had its own support roles which enabled it to operate independently, including Clerks, Chefs and Storemen. In total the unit was established for 45 Officers and Soldiers.

From 1999 onwards, 395 Air Despatch Troop's mission was to provide specialist aerial delivery capability to 16 Air Assault Brigade, Defence and Other Government Departments.

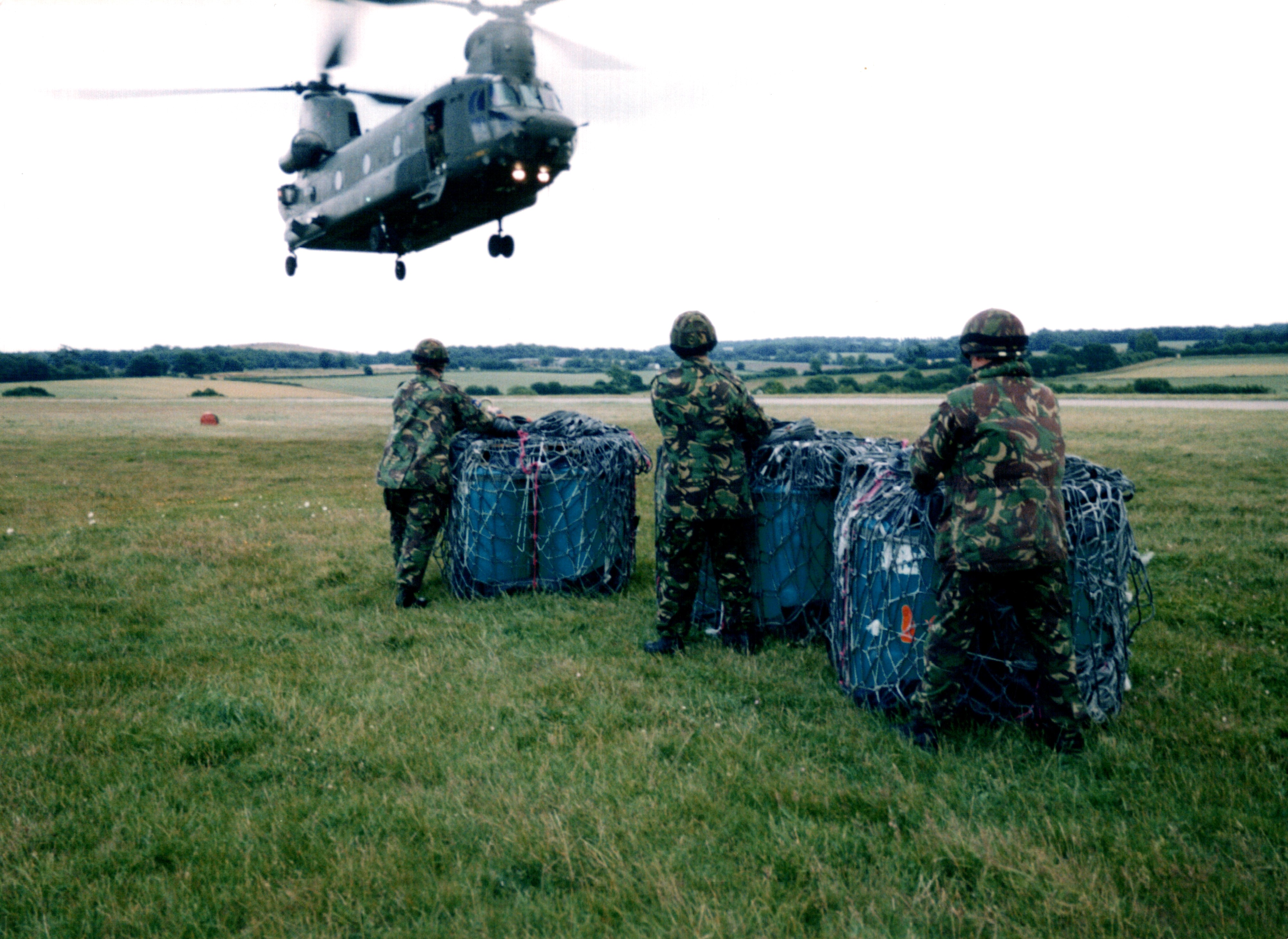
Members of 395 Air Despatch Troop preparing loads for lifting on a CH47 Chinook helicopter

During its history 395 Air Despatch Troop provided troops for multiple military activities including to Northern Ireland, Cyprus, Bosnia, Kosovo, Afghanistan and Iraq. Individual reinforcements provided support during the First Gulf War (1991) and 395 Troop was mobilised to backfill 47 Air Despatch Squadron during operations in Iraq in 2003: During the period that the troop was mobilised it also provided support the Submarine Parachute Assistance Group and to 1312 Flight RAF in the South Atlantic.

395 Air Despatch Troop was disbanded as part of Army 2020 which was the rebranding and restructuring of the British Army to operate to a smaller, more templated format. In creating the Army 2020 structure, hybrid units such as 395 Air Despatch Troop were not considered necessary and were subsequently disbanded, with larger units becoming part of a twinning arrangement that paired regular and reserve regiments with similar capabilities.
