= Operation Colossus =

WWII British military airborne operation

- Part of World War II
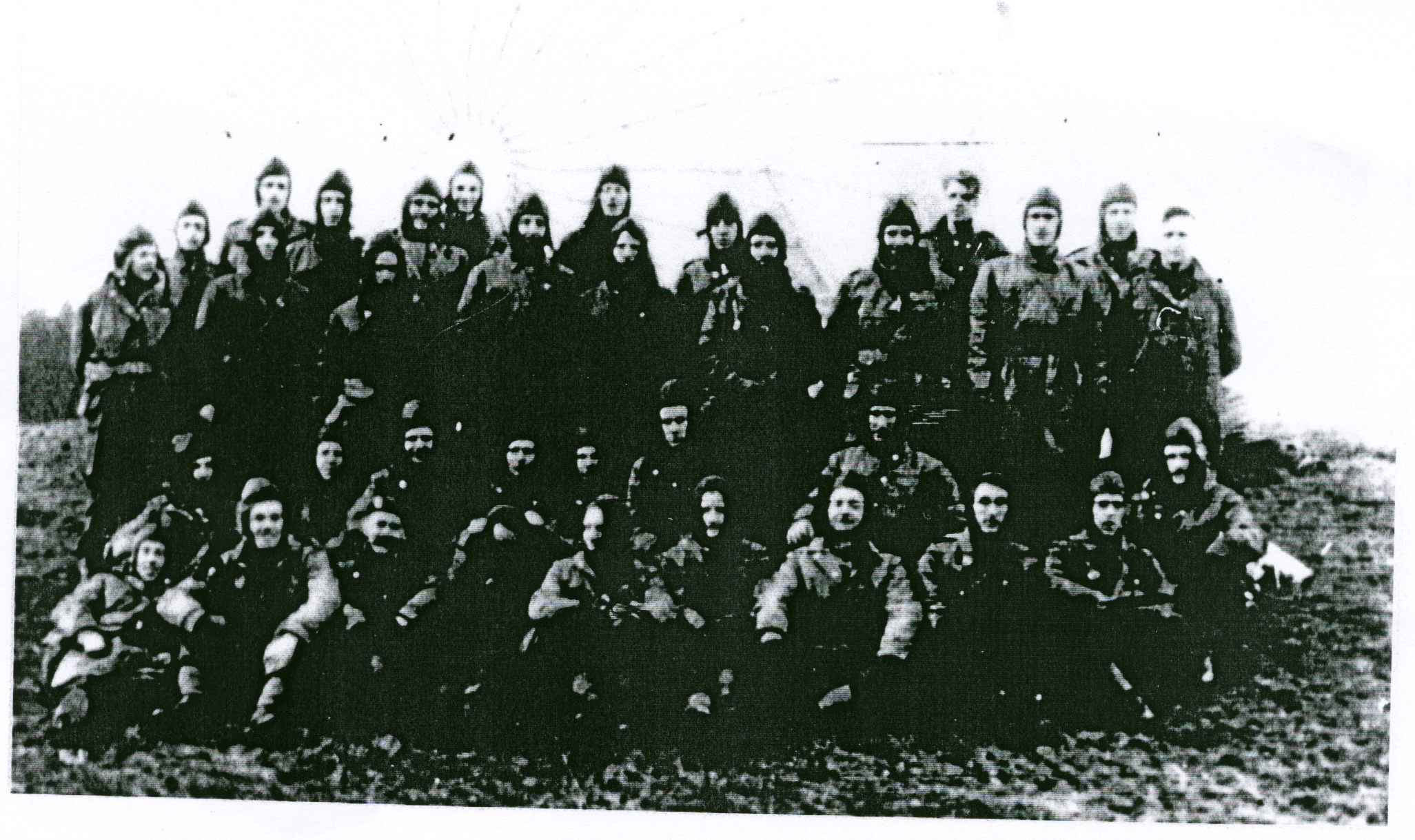
- Men from No.2 Commando (No. 11 Special Air Service Battalion) who participated in Operation Colossus
Date	10 February 1941
Location	Calitri, Italy
Result	See Aftermath section

Belligerents
United Kingdom	Italy

Commanders and leaders
Major Trevor A. G. Pritchard	General Nicola Bellomo

Strength
38	Unknown

Casualties and losses
1 killed in action, 1 wounded, 35 prisoners of war	

Operation Colossus was the codename given to the first airborne operation undertaken by the British military, which occurred on 10 February 1941 during World War II. The British airborne establishment was formed in June 1940 by the order of the British Prime Minister, Winston Churchill, in response to the successful airborne operations conducted by the German military during the Battle of France. Training began immediately but a shortage of proper equipment and training facilities, as well as bureaucratic difficulties, meant that only a small number of volunteers could immediately be trained as parachute troops. The first airborne unit to be formed was actually a re-trained Commando unit, No. 2 Commando, which was subsequently renamed as No. 11 Special Air Service Battalion and numbered approximately 350 officers and other ranks by September 1940. The battalion finished its training in December 1940 and in February 1941 thirty-eight members of the battalion, known as X Troop, were selected to conduct an airborne operation, which was intended to test the capability of the airborne troops and their equipment, as well as the ability of the Royal Air Force to accurately deliver them.

The target chosen for the operation was a fresh-water aqueduct near Calitri in southern Italy, which supplied water to a large portion of the Italian population as well as several ports used by the Italian armed forces; it was also hoped that its destruction would hamper Italian military efforts in North Africa and Albania. The airborne troops were delivered by converted Armstrong Whitworth Whitley medium bombers to the target on 10 February, but equipment failures and navigational errors meant that a significant portion of the troop's explosives and a team of Royal Engineer sappers landed in the wrong area. Despite this setback the remaining members of the troop destroyed the aqueduct and withdrew from the area. All were captured by the Italian authorities within a short time; an Italian translator was tortured and executed and one paratrooper managed to escape but the rest remained as prisoners of war. The aqueduct was rapidly repaired before local water reserves ran out, ensuring that the local population and the ports were not deprived of water and the Italian war effort was not hampered. The operation served as a morale boost for the fledgling airborne establishment and the technical and operational lessons learnt from the operation helped the development of later airborne operations.

== Background ==
The German military was one of the pioneers of the use of airborne formations, conducting several successful airborne operations during the Battle of France in 1940, including the Battle of Fort Eben-Emael. Impressed by the success of German airborne operations, the Allied governments decided to form their own airborne formations. This decision would eventually lead to the creation of two British airborne divisions, as well as a number of smaller units. The British airborne establishment began development on 22 June 1940, when the Prime Minister, Winston Churchill, directed the War Office in a memorandum to investigate the possibility of creating a corps of 5,000 parachute troops. Despite the Prime Minister's desire to have 5,000 airborne troops within a short period, a number of problems were rapidly encountered by the War Office. Very few gliders existed in Britain in 1940, and these were too light for military purposes, and there was also a shortage of suitable transport aircraft to tow gliders and carry paratroopers. On 10 August, Churchill was informed that although 3,500 volunteers had been selected to train as airborne troops, only 500 could currently begin training due to limitations in equipment and aircraft. The War Office stated in a memorandum to the Prime Minister in December 1940 that 500 parachute troops could probably be trained and be ready for operations by the spring of 1941, but this figure was purely arbitrary; the actual number that could be trained and prepared by that period would rely entirely on the creation of a training establishment and the provision of required equipment.

A training establishment for parachute troops was set up at RAF Ringway near Manchester on 21 June 1940 and named the Central Landing Establishment, and the initial 500 volunteers began training for airborne operations. The Royal Air Force provided a number of Armstrong Whitworth Whitley medium bombers for conversion into transport aircraft for paratroopers. A number of military gliders were also designed, starting with the General Aircraft Hotspur, but gliders were not used by the British until Operation Freshman in 1942. Organizational plans were also being laid down, with the War Office calling for two parachute brigades to be operational by 1943. However, the immediate development of any further airborne formations, as well as the initial 500 volunteers already training, was hampered by three problems. With the threat of invasion in 1940, many War Office officials and senior British Army officers did not believe that sufficient men could be spared from the effort to rebuild the Army after the Battle of France to create an effective airborne force; many believed that such a force would only have a nuisance raiding value and would not affect the conflict in any useful way. There were also material problems; all three of the armed services were expanding and rebuilding, particularly the Army, and British industry had not yet been organized to a sufficient war footing to support all three services as well as the fledgling airborne force. Finally, the airborne forces lacked a single, coherent policy, with no clear idea as to how they should be organized, or whether they should come under the command of the Army or the RAF; inter-organizational rivalry between the War Office and the Air Ministry, in charge of the RAF, was a major factor in delaying the further expansion of British airborne forces.

== Preparation ==
On 26 April 1941, the Prime Minister was shown a demonstration of the airborne force that Britain currently possessed, and was informed that although some 800 parachute troops had been trained, their deployment was severely limited by the lack of suitable aircraft which could be used to transport them to any prospective targets. The primary airborne formation in existence by this time was No. 11 Special Air Service Battalion, which numbered approximately 350 officers and other ranks, and had been formed from No. 2 Commando, a Commando unit which had been selected for conversion into an airborne unit. The Commando began intensive airborne training in June 1940, originally 500 strong, but this had been reduced to 21 officers and 321 other ranks by September 1940; despite already receiving rigorous training, many of the commandos failed their training by refusing to conduct a parachute drop. One senior RAF officer at the Central Landing Establishment believed that such a large number refused due to a combination of inexperience and a fear that their parachute would not open when they jumped out of the aircraft. On 21 November 1940 the Commando was officially renamed as No. 11 Special Air Service Battalion and reorganized to form a battalion headquarters, one parachute wing and one glider wing. By 17 December the battalion had officially completed its parachute training, including taking part in a number of demonstrations for military observers, and was considered to be ready for active duty.

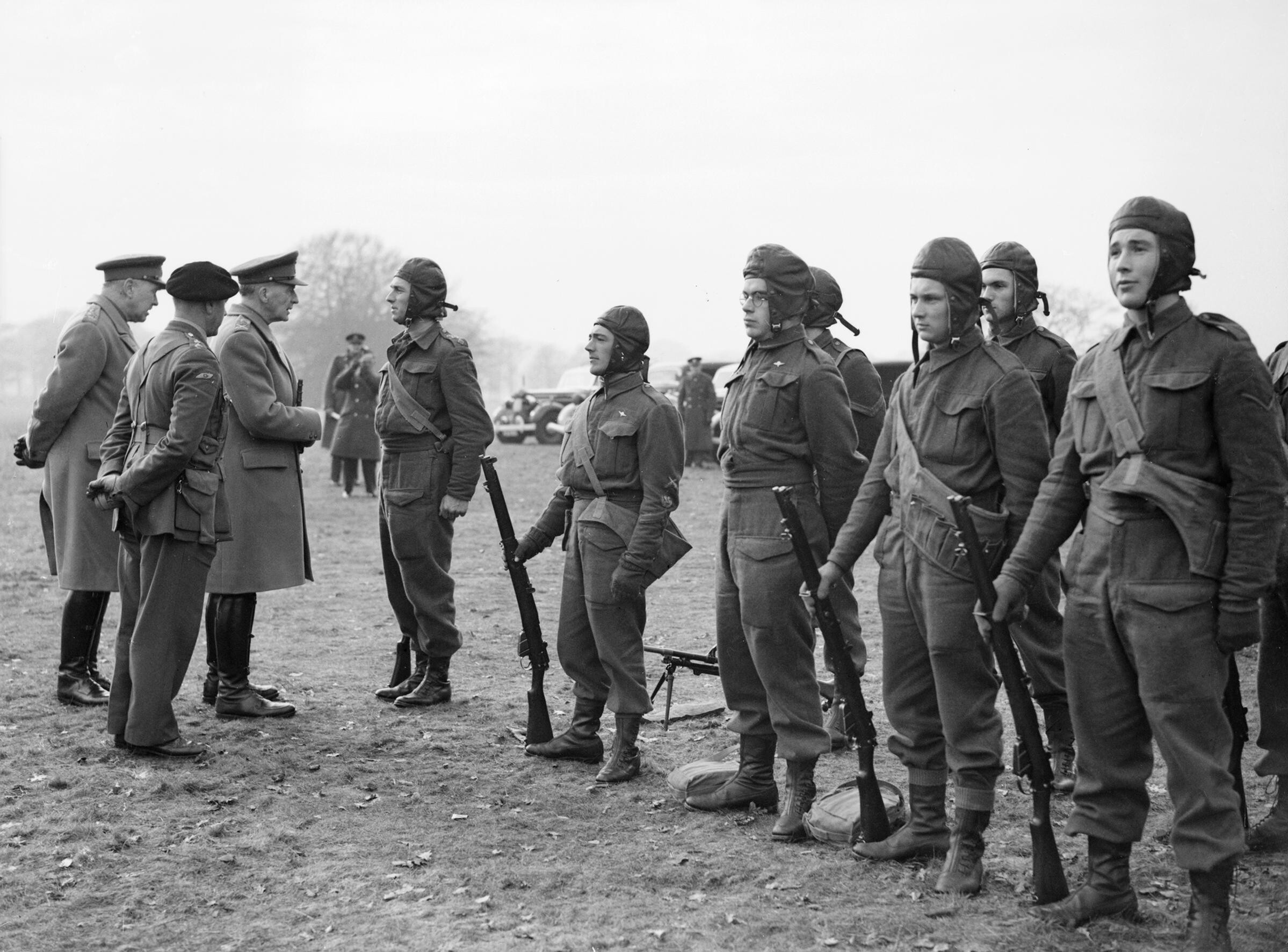
General Sir John Dill, Chief of the Imperial General Staff (CIGS), inspecting parachute troops at the Central Landing Establishment at RAF Ringway near Manchester, December 1940.

There were few airborne resources available to the British Army by mid-1941. The only unit trained and available for an airborne operation was No. 11 Special Air Service Battalion, there were very few transport aircraft available to transport an airborne force, there were few RAF flight crews with experience of parachute droppings and none with operational experience, and there were no specialized overseas facilities to cater exclusively for airborne operations. However, it had been decided that some form of airborne operation would have to be carried out. The reason for mounting an operation with such meagre resources was that it would test the fighting ability of the battalion and its equipment, as well as the RAF's ability to deliver paratroopers at a predetermined location at a required time. The target chosen for the operation was an aqueduct that crossed the Tragino river in the Campania province of southern Italy near the town of Calitri. The aqueduct carried the main water supply for the province of Apulia, which at the time was inhabited by approximately two million Italians and included the strategically important port of Taranto; it was hoped that destroying the aqueduct and depriving the population of their regular water supply would damage their morale, and also have some impact on the Italian war efforts in North Africa and Albania. The aqueduct was a significant distance from the Italian coast, making it unlikely that a sea-borne raiding party could reach it, and it was believed that it was too strongly constructed to be destroyed by aerial bombing; as such, an airborne raid conducted by parachute troops was thought to be the ideal way to eliminate the aqueduct.

A small force of thirty-eight men – seven officers and thirty-one other ranks – was selected from the battalion and designated X Troop, commanded by Major T.A.G. Pritchard of the Royal Welch Fusiliers. Three Italian-speaking interpreters were attached to the troop for the duration of the operation: Squadron Leader Lucky MC, Rifleman Nasri from the Rifle Brigade and a civilian named Fortunato Picchi, a deputy restaurant manager of the Savoy Hotel. Training for the operation began in January 1941 and lasted for six weeks, in order to allow time for six Whitley bombers to be converted to drop parachutists. A full-scale model of the aqueduct was built in early February to allow the troop to practice its assault, and during training one enlisted man was killed when he parachuted into an ice-covered pond and drowned before he could be rescued. The plan for the operation called for six Whitleys of No. 51 Squadron RAF to transport X Troop from Malta to the target area on 10 February, while another two bombers would carry out a diversionary raid against railway yards at Foggia, approximately 60 miles (97 km) to the north of the aqueduct. At 21:30 the troop would be dropped around the objective, attack and demolish it, and then withdraw 50 miles (80 km) to the coast to the mouth of the Sele River, where the submarine HMS Triumph would pick them up on the night of 15 February.

== The operation ==
On 7 February X Troop boarded the six converted Whitley bombers and were transported 1,600 miles (2,600 km) to Malta without incident, despite a significant portion of the journey being over occupied France. There the troop were briefed with aerial reconnaissance photographs of the objective that were provided by the Photographic Reconnaissance Unit, which showed that there were actually two aqueducts in the area, one larger than the other; after a brief discussion it was decided that the larger of the two would be targeted.

At 18:30 on 10 February, the six Whitleys took off from Malta, each carrying one officer and five other ranks of X Troop; the flight to the target area was uneventful, with clear weather and perfect visibility. The lead Whitley reached the drop zone, which was approximately 500 metres (550 yd) from the aqueduct, at 21:42. All six men and their equipment containers landed within 250 metres (270 yd) of the drop zone, as did the men from the next four aircraft; however two of the bombers failed to drop their containers due to the icing up of the release mechanisms, and the sixth aircraft failed to locate the drop zone and eventually dropped its six men and containers two hours later in a valley two miles from the aqueduct. These six men were the Royal Engineer sappers who were supposed to rig the aqueduct for demolition, and their Whitley had been carrying most of the explosives. Despite these losses, the troop gathered up the remaining containers and took up positions around the aqueduct. However, on examining the aqueduct it was found the piers supporting it were made of reinforced concrete and not brick as had been expected, leading Pritchard to suspect that the remaining explosives might be insufficient to demolish the aqueduct. After closer inspection, Pritchard ordered that the majority of the explosives be placed around the western pier and the rest against its abutment, in the hope that this would cause enough damage to destroy the aqueduct. A small amount of explosives were also placed under a nearby bridge that bridged the Ginestra river.

Memorial to the men of the Parachute Regiment at Tatton Park

At 00:30 on 11 February, the explosives were detonated and the western pier destroyed, causing the aqueduct to crumble and effectively break in half, and the Ginestra bridge was also successfully destroyed. Leaving one man who had broken his ankle when he had landed with a nearby farmer, the remainder of the Troop withdrew from the area at 01:00, splitting into three groups and heading towards the coast. The three groups moved as fast as possible towards the coast, but were all captured within a few hours of the aqueduct being demolished. The group commanded by Major Pritchard was spotted by a farmer, who raised the alarm at a nearby village, leading to a local carabinieri unit surrounding the group; with little ammunition and heavily outnumbered, Pritchard decided to surrender. The other three groups, including the six sappers, fared little better. The two groups from the aqueduct were soon located by Italian soldiers and ambushed, forcing them to surrender after brief firefights. The third group were found by a group of civilians as they moved towards the coast; after attempting to bluff their way past by claiming to be German soldiers on a special field exercise, which failed when the local mayor demanded identity papers, they were captured by carabinieri. All were stripped of their weapons and equipment and transported to the civilian prison of Naples and then to the POW camp of Sulmona, with the exception of the Italian translator, Picchi, who was taken to Rome, found guilty of treason by the high court of the Special Tribunal for the Defense of the State (Tribunale Speciale per la Difesa dello Stato) and shot at the military prison of Forte Bravetta (Rome) on 6 April 1941.

Even if any of the groups had managed to make their way to the coast and the rendezvous point, they would not have been picked up by HMS Triumph. One of the two Whitleys conducting the diversionary raid at Foggia had suffered engine trouble after bombing the railway yards. The pilot radioed Malta, informing his airfield that he was ditching in the mouth of the River Sele, coincidentally the area where the rendezvous was to occur. Fearing that the message had been monitored by the Italians and that the submarine might sail into a trap, the decision was made by senior officers not to send it to the rendezvous point.

== Aftermath ==
The destruction of the Tragino aqueduct had a negligible effect on the Italian war effort in North Africa and Albania, as it did not create a serious interruption to the water supplies of Taranto and other ports; the water supplies in local reservoirs lasted for the short period needed for the aqueduct to be repaired. However, the operation did create a certain amount of alarm in the Italian population and caused stringent new air raid precautions to be introduced by the Italian government, which were still in place when Italy surrendered in 1943. The military historian Major General Julian Thompson criticized the operation. He claimed that although there was a great deal of planning in terms of how to insert the airborne troops, there was insufficient planning devoted to how they would be extracted. He also criticized the lack of information gathered about the aqueduct, despite it being "hardly difficult to obtain."

Lessons taken from the operation provided the British military with valuable operational and technical experience that helped shape future airborne operations, such as Operation Biting. It demonstrated the range and flexibility of airborne troops and proved that they could pose a threat to the Axis powers, and also provided a morale boost for the British military and the fledgling airborne establishment. In terms of technical experience, it was found that the containers used to drop equipment for the troop were manufactured from a soft-skinned material, which sagged during flight and blocked the bomb bay doors from opening; future containers were constructed from metal to ensure this did not occur. All of the surviving members of X Troop would remain as prisoners of war until they were repatriated with the Italian surrender, with the exceptions of: Lieutenant Anthony Deane-Drummond and Sapper Alfred Parker. Deane-Drummond escaped and returned to England in 1942, joining the newly formed 1st Airborne Division. Parker escaped from the Sulmona POW camp but was later recaptured by the Germans. After witnessing the execution by the Germans of a fellow escapee and a number of Italians (later recognized as a war atrocity), Parker again escaped and eventually made his way back to the UK after hitching a ride to North Africa on a US forces Dakota aircraft.

When the airborne establishment was expanded, No. 11 Special Air Service Battalion was renamed 1st Parachute Battalion, and eventually formed the nucleus of 1st Parachute Brigade when it was created in September 1941.

== Bibliography ==
- Flanagan, E. M. Jr (2002). Airborne – A Combat History of American Airborne Forces. Random House. ISBN 0-89141-688-9.
- Harclerode, Peter (2005). Wings Of War – Airborne Warfare 1918–1945. Weidenfeld & Nicolson. ISBN 0-304-36730-3.
- Otway, Lieutenant-Colonel T. B. H. (1990). The Second World War 1939–1945 Army – Airborne Forces. Imperial War Museum. ISBN 0-901627-57-7.
- Paterson, Lawrence (2020). Operation Colossus The First British Airborne Raid of World War II Army – Airborne Forces. Greenhill. ISBN 9781784383787.
- Saunders, Hilary St. George (1954). The Red Beret: The Story of the Parachute Regiment 1940–1945. Michael Joseph.
- Thompson, Major General Julian (1999). The Imperial War Museum War Behind Enemy Lines. Pan Grand. ISBN 0-330-36761-7.
- Tugwell, Maurice (1971). Airborne To Battle – A History Of Airborne Warfare 1918–1971. William Kimber. ISBN 0-7183-0262-1.
- Silvio Tasselli, "Colussus" l'acquedotto pugliese, prima azione inglese di sabotaggio in Italia, febbraio 1941, "Storia & Battaglie", N. 33–34, Febbraio – Marzo 2004.
