= 562 Parachute Squadron Royal Corps of Transport (Volunteers) =

562 Transport Squadron RLC (v)
- Corps Badge
- Active: 1947–1978
- Country: United Kingdom
- Branch: British Army
- Role: Logistic Support 44 Para Bde
- Size: Sqn Hq, 3 Task Troops, REME LAD, RAOC Platoon
- Garrison/HQ: Sqn HQ – Southall Middlesex; A Troop – West Ham; B Troop – Dulwich
- Motto: Nil Sine Labore (Nothing Without Labour) (Latin)

Commanders
- Colonel-in-Chief: HRH Princess Alice, Duchess of Gloucester

Insignia
- Drop Zone Flash

- Arm Badge Parachute Wings

562 Parachute Squadron Royal Corps of Transport (Volunteers) was a minor unit that supported 44th Parachute Brigade (V). For further historical information follow https://rlc-museum-collection.co.uk/library/archive/journals/reserve/a-history-of-562-parachute-sqn-rctv.

== Organisation and history ==
1947

When the Territorial Army (TA) was reformed in the UK, the included the 16th Airborne Division (TA), which had its divisional headquarters in Chelsea, South-West London. The division included a(RASC) column, which came into existence on 1 January, though recruiting did not open until 1 May.

The headquarters of 16th Airborne Divisional Column, RASC (TA) was initially at The Duke of York's headquarters in Chelsea; but, in 1949, it was relocated to the TA Centre at Hayes Bridge, Southall, Middlesex. The column comprised three companies:

- 1560th Company (Airborne Divisional Composite), RASC (TA), at Park Lane, Tottenham, N17.
- 1561st Company (Airborne Divisional Composite), RASC (TA), at Vine Street, Uxbridge.
- 1562nd Company (Airborne Divisional Composite), RASC (TA), at Hayes Bridge, Southall.

The four-figure numbers allocated to the companies denoted that they were newly raised units of the TA, having not existed prior to the Second World War.

The commanding officer and adjutant were regular officers: the regimental sergeant major, permanent staff instructors (PSI) and a small cadre of drivers were regular soldiers. All other posts were filled by TA volunteer soldiers. The organisation of these companies was similar to the regular army RASC company, except that they were on war establishment and had a smaller composite platoon. The Parachute course for the TA was compressed into two weeks to meet their limited training availability, but included the eight qualifying jumps.

1951

A new numbering system for RASC (TA) units was adopted, whereby all Companies were given a three-figure number. As a result, the "1" prefix, was dropped and the Companies became known as 560th, 561st and 562nd Companies (Parachute Brigade Transport), RASC (Middlesex) (TA).

1952

Each company was allocated its own integral Light Aid Detachments (LAD) of the Royal Electrical and Mechanical Engineers (REME).

1955

The LADs were upgraded to company workshops. 560th Coy relocated to the TA Centre in Tottenham High Road, N17 and 561st Company relocated to the TA Centre at Cowley. The War Office announced that 16th Abn Div (TA) would disband the following year and be replaced by a single parachute brigade. The RASC unit required for the brigade would be reduced to a single company.

1956

In October, 44th Independent Parachute Brigade Group (TA) was created, with headquarters at The Duke of York's HQ, Chelsea, London SW3. The 16th Airborne Divisional Column was temporarily placed under command of this brigade as it underwent the process of disbandment and reorganisation into one company.

1957

In February, 16 Airborne Divisional Column, RASC (TA) was disbanded and 562nd Company (Independent Parachute Brigade Transport), RASC (Middlesex) (TA) became the sole RASC unit in the brigade. It remained at Hayes Bridge along with its REME Workshops.

1965

There was a general re-organisation of the British Army Corps structure, which led to the RASC transport and supply functions being separated and the corps disbanded. The new military transport organisation formed from this restructuring was the Royal Corps of Transport (RCT). The supply function was transferred to an enlarged Royal Army Ordnance Corps (RAOC). As a result of these changes, and the formation of the new corps, 562nd Coy was redesignated as 562nd (Middlesex) Independent Parachute Squadron, RCT (TA).

1967

The year saw a transformation of the Reserve Forces (Army), and the Territorial Army became the Territorial and Army Volunteer Reserve (TAVR). 562 Independent Parachute Squadron, RCT (Volunteers) was formed on 1 April 1967 as a successor unit to the old 562 Para Sqn RCT (TA). The Squadron HQ and HQ Troop remained at Hayes Bridge, Southall, along with "C" Troop, whilst "A" Troop was formed at the Cedars TA Centre, Portway, West Ham, London E15 and "B" Troop at Lordship Lane, Dulwich, London SE22. The squadron continued to support 44 Parachute Brigade (Volunteers) as its integral RCT unit.

A new unit, 395 Air Despatch Troop, RCT (Volunteers), had been formed in 1967 at Coulsdon, Surrey. This was the first Air Despatch unit to be raised outside of the Regular Army and, in 1971, the troop was relocated to Bristol and then, subsequently, to Chippenham in Wiltshire, so as to be near to its Regular Army counterpart, 47 Air Despatch Squadron, RCT. Some personnel from the troop at Coulsdon transferred to the squadron's "B" Troop at Dulwich.

On the demise of the RASC, there had still been a requirement for a combat supplies function to provide ammunition, fuel and rations to 44 Parachute Brigade (V). This function was assigned to a Combat Supplies Platoon formed within 562 Para Sqn. This platoon was based at Southall and manned by RAOC Territorial Army soldiers trained in that particular role (see potted history of this sub unit below).

Final Order of Battle – 562 Parachute Squadron Royal Corps of Transport (Volunteers)

- HQ Troop, C Troop, Combat Supplies Platoon, Workshops all based at the Drill Hall, Southall, Middlesex.
- A Troop was based in The Cedars Drill Hall, West Ham.
- B Troop was based at the Drill Hall, Lordship Lane, Dulwich.

The squadron was commanded by a major and was established along traditional lines with a captain as second-in-command (2I/C). Other captains held appointments, such as the Transport Control Officer (TCO). The transport troops were usually commanded by a subaltern with a staff sergeant (SSGT) as 2I/C. The REME workshop was commanded by either a captain or subaltern with a warrant officer class two, who held the appointment of artificer quartermaster sergeant (AQMS), as 2I/C.

HQ troop was, of course, the unit's nerve centre: it was where the squadron sergeant major and chief clerk amongst other appointments were to be found.

As an independent Territorial Army squadron, there were also a number of regular army soldiers posted to the establishment of the squadron. Their primary role was to advise the command elements in training matters and ensure that the unit retained its fully trained operational status. These soldiers were known as permanent staff instructors (PSI's).

- Officer commanding major could either be a regular or TA soldier.
- WO2 PSI (training Responsibility)
- SSGT (SQMS) squadron quartermaster sergeant (Maintenance of weapons and stores)
- SSGT chief clerk (admin and documentation)
- WO2/SSGT REME (training responsibility for the workshop)

The unit's role was to provide transport support to the Territorial Army's 44 Parachute Brigade (V). When this brigade was disbanded in March 1978, 562 Parachute Squadron RCT (Volunteers) was redesignated 562 Squadron RCT (Volunteers) and taken under the command of 151 (Greater London) Transport Regiment RCT (Volunteers). With the loss of the parachuting role and the coveted "Red Beret", significant numbers of the unit transferred to other TA units that still retained a parachute role. The Parachute Regiment's 10th Battalion being the biggest beneficiary as, like the squadron, it too was based in London.

For a comprehensive history see the RLC museum website. https://rlc-museum-collection.co.uk/library/archive/journals/reserve/a-history-of-562-parachute-sqn-rctv.

== History of 562 Para Combat Supplies Platoon ==
This unit was formed after the reorganization from the RASC to the RCT. It is descended from the Composite companies in 16 Airborne Division and 562 Parachute Coy RASC TA. These units supplied ammunition, fuel, composite rations, fresh meat, bread, and vegetables to the front line. Thus, anyone who was a butcher, baker or greengrocer and could be Para trained would be selected to serve. The Airborne was no different except for the fact that every thing they needed had to be delivered by air or sourced locally from the indigenous population when on the ground as supplies by road could not be guaranteed.

The re-badging parade was held at Plaisterdown Camp in July 1967. The unit was badged as RAOC in line with the M.O.D. policy at that time, that all Army transport would be administered by the newly formed RCT. 562 Para Parachute Combat Supplies Platoon RAOC (V) was born and would now be responsible for supplying all combat supplies (ammunition, fuel, and rations) to 44 Parachute Brigade's fighting echelons. Personnel with the relevant civilian trade experience were all Para trained and, later, they were to have acquired rigging skills on Medium and Heavy Stressed Platforms at J.A.T.E. Watchfield. Their main function was to set Distribution Points (DPs) for Combat Supplies to the rear of the Airborne fighting echelons. The stores would then be collected by the "Q" reps of each unit on the ground, which included setting up re-fuelling facilities for heliborne exercises. This unit also had another function: when the brigade was in a static location, it would be required to provide a source of high quality fresh meat, vegetables, and other foodstuffs from local suppliers so as to feed the paratroopers on the ground.

This would mean that they would have to identify fresh vegetable suppliers, local baking and slaughtering facilities and, if necessary, bring them up to the required military standard using existing civilian labour. There was a case where this happened when 44 Parachute Brigade went to Cyprus on "Ex New Venture". 562 Parachute Combat Supplies RAOC was tasked to visit the local meat supplier to the UNCYP Forces based on the island. Sgt Dalton, Corporals Preston and Laing (who are all qualified Master Butchers in civilian life) were on hand to advise on the latest slaughtering techniques and meat preparation, which included sausage making. This was very much appreciated by UNICYP, especially the British contingent.

== History of 562 Parachute Squadron Workshop REME (V) ==
Until 1965, when the RASC became the RCT, the REME within 562 Parachute Company comprised a light aid detachment, located in the workshop area of the drill hall at Southall Middlesex. This unit only had responsibility for first line recovery/repairs and was manned accordingly.

In 1965, the establishment and scale of equipment for 562 Workshop element was increased with responsibility given for second line repairs. This gave rise to the change of title from light aid detachment to workshop, still based at Southall.

Because 16 Para Brigade retained its full workshop within 1st Parachute Logistic Regiment, 562 became the only parachute squadron workshop in the British Army with a unique establishment and role.

The only other REME formation in 44 Brigade was a parachute platoon of 133 Field Workshop [REME](V) based in Coventry. Other REME personnel in the brigade comprised attached personnel.

The workshop was established with a captain commanding, WO2 AQMS as 2I/C and six other senior ranks, including a sergeant storeman. The permanent staff instructor was a regular Para-trained WO2 artificer until 1975 when a Para-trained SSGT artisan was posted in.

During the 1970s, the workshop regularly took part in Exercise Southern Craftsman (the annual REME fitness for role/field engineering competition) and won on three occasions. Workshop personnel also took part in a number of competitions, representing 562 Squadron including Nijmegen Marches, Courage Trophy, AESOR and Chichester March.

== See also ==
- United Kingdom Special Forces
- British Army
- Modern equipment and uniform of the British Army

== External links and sources ==
- RCT Members Association.
- RCT Regimental March
