= Mount Royal (disambiguation) =

Mount Royal is a large hill in Montreal, Quebec, Canada

Mount Royal, Mont Royal, and similar, may also refer to:

== Mountains, places, and other geographic features ==
=== Australia ===
- Mount Royal Range, part of a UNESCO World Heritage Site in Barrington Tops National Park
  - Mount Royal (New South Wales), a peak within the range
  - Mount Royal National Park, a national park located partially on the range
- Mount Royal, a heritage-listed mansion in Strathfield, NSW, which is now the Mount St Mary Campus of the Australian Catholic University.

=== Canada ===
==== Alberta ====
- Mount Royal, Calgary, a wealthy area of the city of Calgary
- Mount Royal University, a graduate university located in Calgary

==== Quebec ====
- Mount Royal, a large hill in the centre of Montreal Island
  - Mount Royal Park, the central park of Montreal, on the eponymous hill
  - Mount Royal Tunnel, a tunnel through Mount Royal
  - Mount Royal Cross, a Montreal landmark atop Mount Royal
  - Mount Royal Cemetery, a cemetery on the slopes of Mount Royal
- Mount Royal, Quebec, suburb of Montreal
  - Ville-de-Mont-Royal station, a REM station in the Town of Mount Royal, formerly a commuter rail station named Mont-Royal
  - Baron Strathcona and Mount Royal, or Baron Mount Royal, the British Barony based in Mount Royal
- Mount Royal Avenue or Avenue du Mont-Royal, a street in Montreal and Outremont in Quebec
  - Mount Royal Arena, a former home of the Montreal Canadiens NHL Hockey Club
  - Mont-Royal (Montreal Metro), a Montreal Metro station on Line 2
- Les Fusiliers Mont-Royal, one of the oldest surviving units in the Canadian army
- Mount Royal (electoral district), a federal electoral district that includes the Town of Mount Royal
- Mont-Royal (provincial electoral district), a provincial electoral district that includes the Town of Mount Royal
- Le Plateau-Mont-Royal, a borough of Montreal on the east side of Mount Royal mountain and through which Mont-Royal Avenue runs.
- Les Cours Mont-Royal, a Montreal shopping centre, part of the Montreal Underground City

==== Other parts of Canada ====
- Mount Royal, Saskatoon, a neighbourhood on the city's west side
- Mount Royal, Prince Edward Island, an unincorporated area in Prince Edward Island

=== France ===
- Mont-Royal is the pre-Revolutionary name of the commune of Sarreinsberg in Moselle
- Château Mont-Royal, a chateau in La Chapelle-en-Serval, Oise

=== Germany ===
- Mont Royal, Germany (fortress), ruins of a fortress on the same-named hill, near Traben-Trarbach, Rhineland-Palatinate

=== United States ===
- Mount Royal (Colorado), a mountain near Frisco, Colorado
- Mount Royal (Florida), a site in Putnam County, on the National Register of Historic Places
- Mount Royal (New York), a mountain in Schoharie County
- Mount Royal, New Jersey, a town in Gloucester County
- Mount Royal Station (Maryland Institute College of Art) in Baltimore, Maryland
- Mt. Royal/MICA station in Baltimore, Maryland

== Other ==
- Mount Royal (sternwheeler), operated on the Skeena River in British Columbia
- Mount Royal (TV series), a 1980s television drama TV series, Canada-France coproduction
- Mount Royal (album), by guitarists Julian Lage and Chris Eldridge

== See also ==
- Mont Royal station (disambiguation)
- Montreal (disambiguation)
- Monte Real, Portugal
- Mons Regalis, Jordan
- Mount Royal (train), a night train of the Rutland Railroad
- Réalmont, France
- Realmonte, Sicily
- Monreale, Sicily
- HMCS Royal Mount, a Royal Canadian Navy ship name
  - HMCS Royal Mount K677
- Regal Mountain
- Royal Mountains
- Cordillera Real (disambiguation)
