= Montreal (disambiguation) =

Montreal is the largest city in Quebec, Canada.

Montréal or Montreal may also refer to:

== Places ==
=== Canada ===
- Island of Montreal, an island in the province of Quebec
- Greater Montreal, the metropolitan area of Montreal
  - Montréal (region), an administrative region and statistical area in the province of Quebec
  - Montreal Metropolitan Community, a supra-municipal level of government
  - Montreal Agglomeration Council, a supra-municipal level of government
  - Montreal Urban Community, a former supra-municipal level of government
- Montreal River, Ontario, a municipality
- Montreal River (Algoma–Sudbury, Ontario)
- Montreal River (Timiskaming District)
- Montreal River (Saskatchewan)
- Montreal Lake (Saskatchewan)
- Montreal Island (Nunavut)

=== France ===
- Château de Montréal, Dordogne
- Montréal, Ardèche
- Montréal, Aude
- Montréal, Gers
- Montréal, Yonne
- Montréal-la-Cluse, Ain
- Montréal-les-Sources, Drôme
- Villeneuve-lès-Montréal, Aude

=== Jordan ===
- Montréal (Crusader castle)
- Lordship of Montréal or Oultrejordain

=== Spain ===
- Montreal, Catalonia

=== United Kingdom ===
- Montreal Park, a park where Geoffrey Amherst had his residence

=== United States ===
- Montreal, Missouri
- Montreal, Wisconsin
- Montreal River (Michigan)
- Montreal River (Wisconsin-Michigan)

== Ships ==
- HMCS Montreal (K319), a River-class frigate in service 1943 to 1945
- HMCS Montréal (FFH 336), a Halifax-class frigate commissioned in 1994
- French frigate Montréal
- HMS Montreal (1761), a 32-gun fifth rate
- HMS Montreal (1813), a 20-gun sloop
- SS City of Montreal (1871) a passenger ship of the Inman Line

== Foods ==
- Montreal-style smoked meat
- Montreal-style bagel
- Montreal steak seasoning
- Montreal hot dog
- Montreal melon

== International Agreements and Declarations ==
- Declaration of Montreal, a declaration of LGBT rights
- Montreal Protocol, a 1987 treaty to protect the ozone layer
- Montreal Convention (disambiguation)

== Other uses ==
- Alfa Romeo Montreal, a car
- Montreal Canadiens, a hockey team
- of Montreal, a band
- "Montreal", a 2011 song by The Weeknd from Echoes of Silence
- Montreal Metro (disambiguation)
- Montreal Cognitive Assessment, a cognitive test
- Montreal International Games Summit, an annual video game conference

== See also ==
- HMCS Montreal, a list of ships
- HMS Montreal, a list of ships
- Montrealer (train), a former Amtrak passenger train service, now the Vermonter
- Montreuil (disambiguation)
- Montreux (disambiguation)
- Mount Royal (disambiguation)
- Monreale, Italy
- Monte Real, Portugal
- Réalmont, France
- Realmonte, Italy
