= Montreal River =

Montreal River may refer to:

== Rivers ==
=== Canada ===
- Montreal River (Algoma–Sudbury, Ontario), a tributary of Lake Superior
- Montreal River (Timiskaming District), a tributary of the Ottawa River
- Montreal River (Saskatchewan)

=== United States ===
- Montreal River (Michigan), a river in the Keweenaw Peninsula
- Montreal River (Wisconsin–Michigan), along the Wisconsin-Michigan border

== Places ==
- Montreal River, Ontario

== See also ==
- Montreal (disambiguation)
- St. Lawrence River, the main river on which the city of Montreal is situated
- Rivière des Prairies, the other river that adjoins Montreal
