= Montrealer (disambiguation) =

A Montrealer is someone or something from Montreal, Quebec, Canada.

Montrealer may also refer to:

- Montrealer (train), a former Amtrak train that ran from 1972 to 1995
- Montrealers' Party, or Parti des Montréalais, a political party in Montreal from 1993 to 1995

== See also ==
- Montreal (disambiguation)
