= HMCS Montreal =

Several Canadian naval units have been named HMCS Montreal.

- HMCS Montreal (I), a Naval Reserve Division in Montreal. Commissioned in 1941, changed her name to HMCS Donnacona in 1943.
- HMCS Montreal (K319) (II), a River-class frigate that served in the Royal Canadian Navy during the Battle of the Atlantic. In service 1943 to 1945 and scrapped 1947.
- HMCS Montréal (FFH 336) (III), a Halifax-class frigate commissioned in 1994.

== Battle honours ==
- Atlantic, 1944–45.
- Arabian Sea

== See also ==
- HMS Montreal
- French frigate Montréal
