= Porto Empedocle =

Porto Empedocle 'a Marina (Sicilian)
- Comune
- Comune di Porto Empedocle
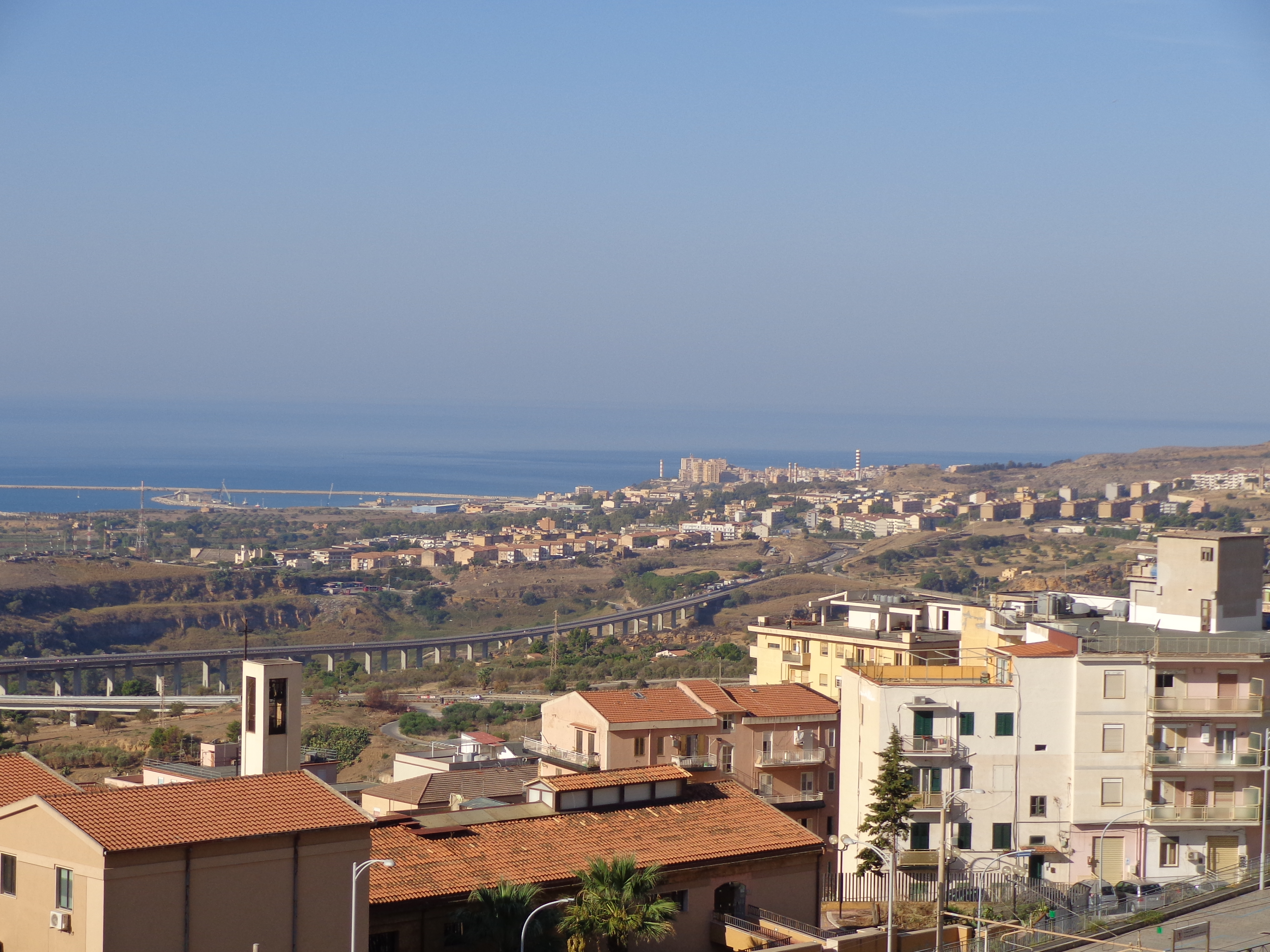
- Porto Empedocle in the background

- Coat of arms

- Position of the municipality of Porto Empedocle in the Free Municipal Consortium of Agrigento

- Location within Italy Location within Sicily
- Coordinates: 37°18′N 13°32′E
- Country: Italy
- Region: Sicily
- Province: Agrigento (AG)

Government
  - Mayor: Calogero Martello (FI)

Area
  - Total: 25.23 km^{2} (9.74 sq mi)
- Elevation: 2 m (6.6 ft)

Population (31 May 2025)
  - Total: 15,389
  - Density: 609.9/km^{2} (1,580/sq mi)
- Demonym: Empedoclini
- Time zone: UTC+1 (CET)
  - Summer (DST): UTC+2 (CEST)
- Postal code: 92014
- Dialing code: 0922
- Patron saint: Saint Gerland of Agrigento
- Saint day: February 25
- Website: Official website

Porto Empedocle (Sicilian: 'a Marina) is a town and comune in Italy on the coast of the Strait of Sicily, administratively part of the province of Agrigento. It was named after Empedocles, a Greek pre-Socratic philosopher and a citizen of the city of Akragas (present-day Agrigento), in his day a Greek colony in Sicily. The primary industries of Porto Empedocle are agriculture, fishing, ironworking, pharmaceuticals and rock salt refining.

== Physical geography ==
=== Climate ===
Porto Empedocle is the second comune with the lowest amount of degree days in Italy. It is in the climatic zone A of the climatic classification of Italian municipalities.

== History ==
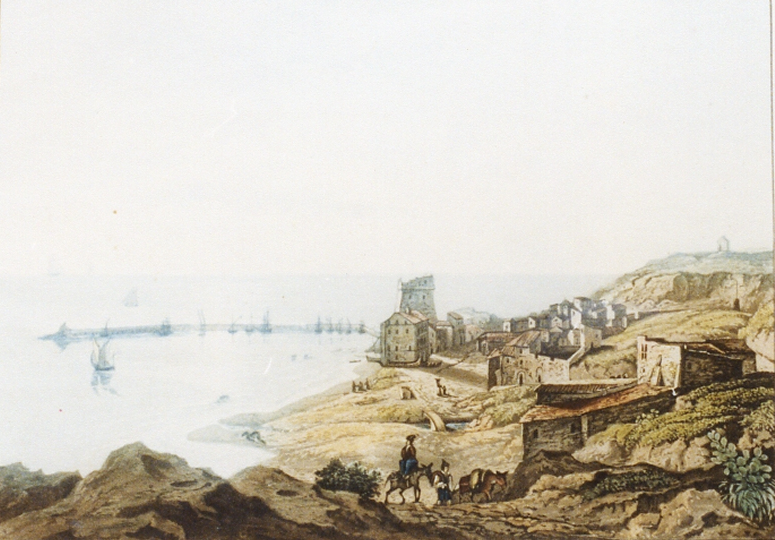
Porto Empedocle in an ancient engraving

Born as a port zone in the old Girgenti, today called Agrigento, under the name of Marina di Girgenti (seashore of Girgenti), since in the 15th century it was the main cereal trading centre of the region. From 1549 to 1554, by order of the viceroy Vega, Torre del caricatore of Girgenti, already known during the ancient times (as it probably already existed before the Angevin period), was restored. It had been built to protect against the Saracen pirates, together with the whole system of the Coastal towers of Sicily. The tower was later again restored by Charles III with the help of Bishop Lorenzo Gioeni. This restoration was completed only in 1763. In 1853, during the government of the Kingdom of the Two Sicilies the town obtained independence by becoming chief town of the decurionato under the name of Molo di Girgenti. Then, in 1863, the town changed its name into Porto Empedocle in memory of the Agrigentine philosopher Empedocles.

In 2003, the town changed its official denomination to Porto Empedocle Vigata, after the name of the fictional town where the novels by Andrea Camilleri, Italian writer and native of the town, about detective Inspector Montalbano to which in 2009 a statue was dedicated in Via Roma. However, the decision was revoked in 2009. On 12 December of the same year, by Decree of the President of the Republic, Porto Empedocle was awarded the title of City.

Today Porto Empedocle constitutes one of the most important economic realities of the province of Agrigento. Its port ensures the connection with the Pelagian Islands are placed.

== Monuments and places of interest ==
=== Religious architecture ===
- Church of Maria Santissima del Buon Consiglio is the main parish church, which is located in the center of the town.

=== Civil architecture ===
- Girgenti Loader Tower, also known as the "Tower of Charles V"
- City Palace
- San Gerlando Auditorium
- Montagna Palace (remains)
- Empedocle Theater
- Coast Guard Building
- Customs Building
- Monument to the Fallen of the World Wars
- Monument to the Fallen at Sea
- Porto Empedocle Station-Museum on Via Lincoln
- Monument to Luigi Pirandello
- Bust of the philosopher Empedocles
- Statue of Inspector Montalbano

=== Natural areas ===
The Scala dei Turchi is located nearby, on the coast of Realmonte.

== Demographic evolution ==
Historical population

Year	Pop.	±%
1861	5,046	—
1871	5,794	+14.8%
1881	7,743	+33.6%
1901	11,059	+42.8%
1911	13,044	+17.9%
1921	13,218	+1.3%

Year	Pop.	±%
1931	14,128	+6.9%
1936	14,764	+4.5%
1951	16,513	+11.8%
1961	16,649	+0.8%
1971	16,283	−2.2%
1981	16,196	−0.5%

Year	Pop.	±%
1991	16,755	+3.5%
2001	15,957	−4.8%
2011	16,841	+5.5%
2021	15,661	−7.0%

Source: Data from ISTAT

=== Foreign ethnicities and minorities ===
As of December 31, 2024 foreigners residents in the municipality were 281, i.e. 1.8% of the population. The largest foreign community is that from Tunisia with 22.1% of all foreigners present in the country, followed by Romania and Morocco.

In Porto Empedocle, there are facilities dedicated to the reception and detention of foreigners, particularly asylum seekers and unaccompanied minors.

== Infrastructure and Transportation ==
=== Roads ===
Porto Empedocle is served by two main roads:

- State Road 115: This is the longest state road on the island, connecting the cities of Trapani and Syracuse. Porto Empedocle is located approximately halfway between the two ends.
- State Road 640 (Strada degli Scrittori): Approximately 70 km long, the road begins in Porto Empedocle and crosses the two provinces of Agrigento and Caltanissetta, passing through the large towns of Favara, Canicattì, and San Cataldo, ending at the junction with the A19 motorway.

=== Railways ===
Since the mid-19th century, Porto Empedocle has been a landing point for rail traffic from inland Sicily. Large cargoes of sulfur and salt arrived at the port, in particular. the Porto Empedocle-Lucia tramway, a 15-kilometer narrow-gauge steam-powered line, operated between 1894 and 1920 to transport sulfur from nearby Solfara Lucia. In the 20th century, Montecatini handled freight traffic between the port and the rest of the province.

The city's main station is Porto Empedocle Centrale, the terminus of the narrow-gauge Porto Empedocle-Castelvetrano line until 1978. After the line from Castelvetrano was closed, the station remained the terminus of the standard-gauge Palermo-Agrigento and Caltanissetta-Agrigento railways. Passenger service between Porto Empedocle and Agrigento Centrale ceased in 1976.

With the closure of the narrow-gauge line to Castelvetrano, rail traffic is limited to special trains organized by the "Ferrovie Kaos" association, which manages part of the Empedocle railway area. Ferrovie Kaos, in collaboration with Trenitalia and the Sicilian Region, has established special trains (Akragas Express) between Porto Empedocle and Agrigento Centrale and between Porto Empedocle and Canicattì during the summer months and during the Almond Blossom Festival, held in the capital.

In 2014, the Porto Empedocle railway park was protected by the Superintendency of Cultural Heritage of Agrigento, due to the numerous examples of industrial archaeology still present and perfectly preserved. In January 2015, the Ministry of Cultural Heritage also awarded the managing body a special mention for the restoration work carried out. Today, the Agrigento Bassa - Porto Empedocle railway line is managed by Rete Ferroviaria Italiana and Fondazione FS Italiane.

On March 12, 2016, after 38 years, the Porto Empedocle branch station located on Via Platone, right in the city center, reopened for service, becoming the terminus of the tourist railway of the temples, managed by the Fondazione FS Italiane.

On the occasion of the centenary of the birth of the writer Andrea Camilleri, the Fondazione Ferrovie dello Stato and Rete Ferroviaria Italiana (FS Group) have positively welcomed the request for the concession of some spaces in the Porto Empedocle Railway Park put forward by various local bodies and associations to celebrate the author of "Inspector Montalbano".

=== Ports ===
The harbor for mooring boats consists of two long piers (west and east) protecting the water. A SW-facing reef is located outside the east pier.

The municipal office "Maritime and Ports, Coasts and PUDM (Maritime State Property Use Plan)" is responsible for the management of port and coastal activities, as well as the planning and regulation of maritime land use.

== Gallery ==
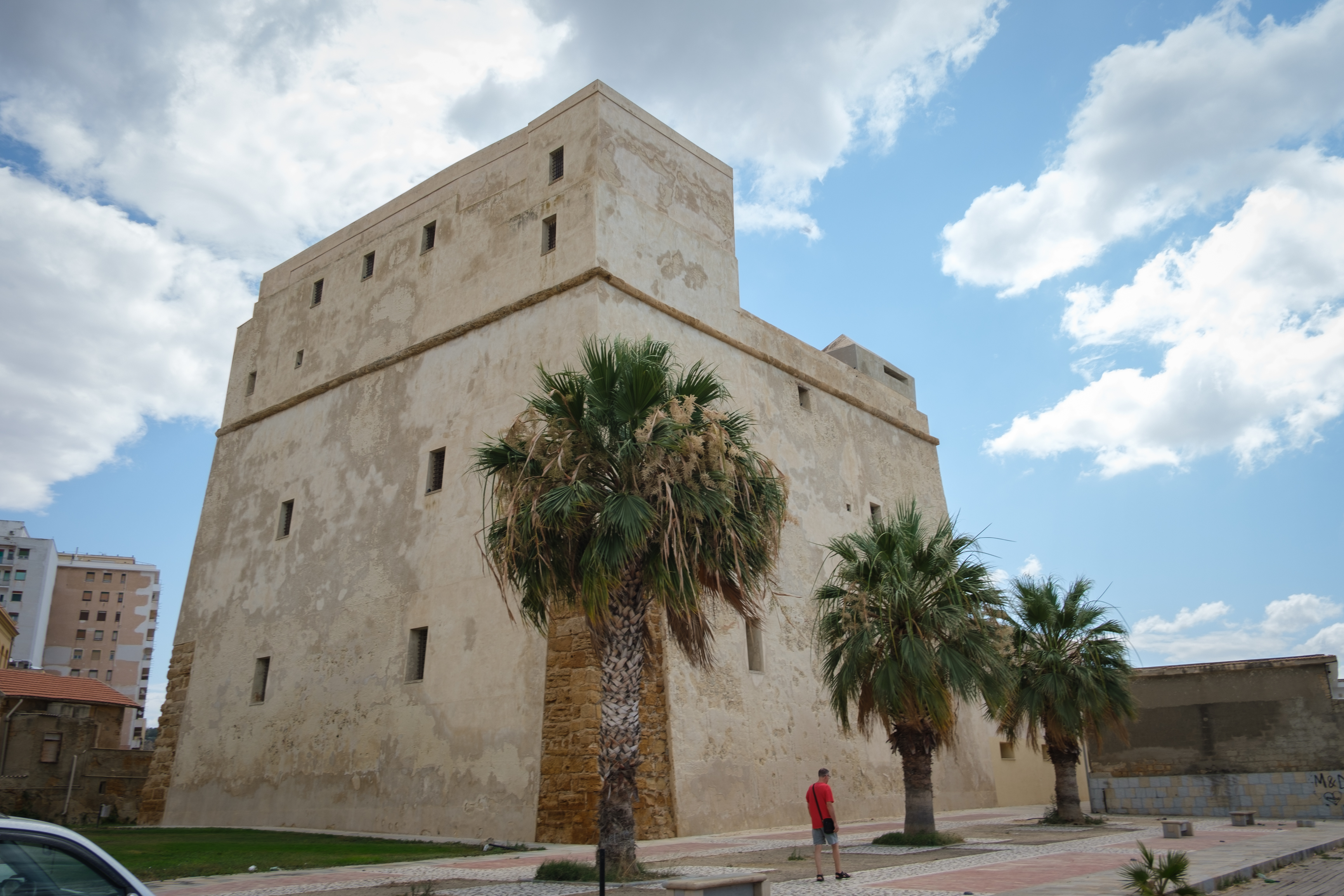
Charles V Tower

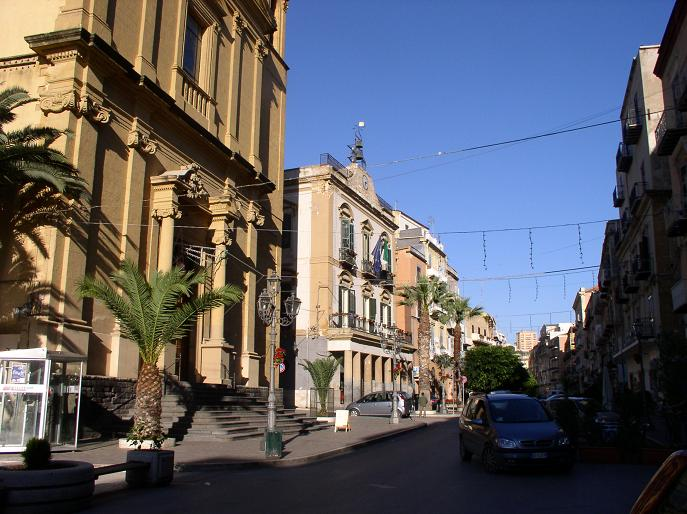
City center

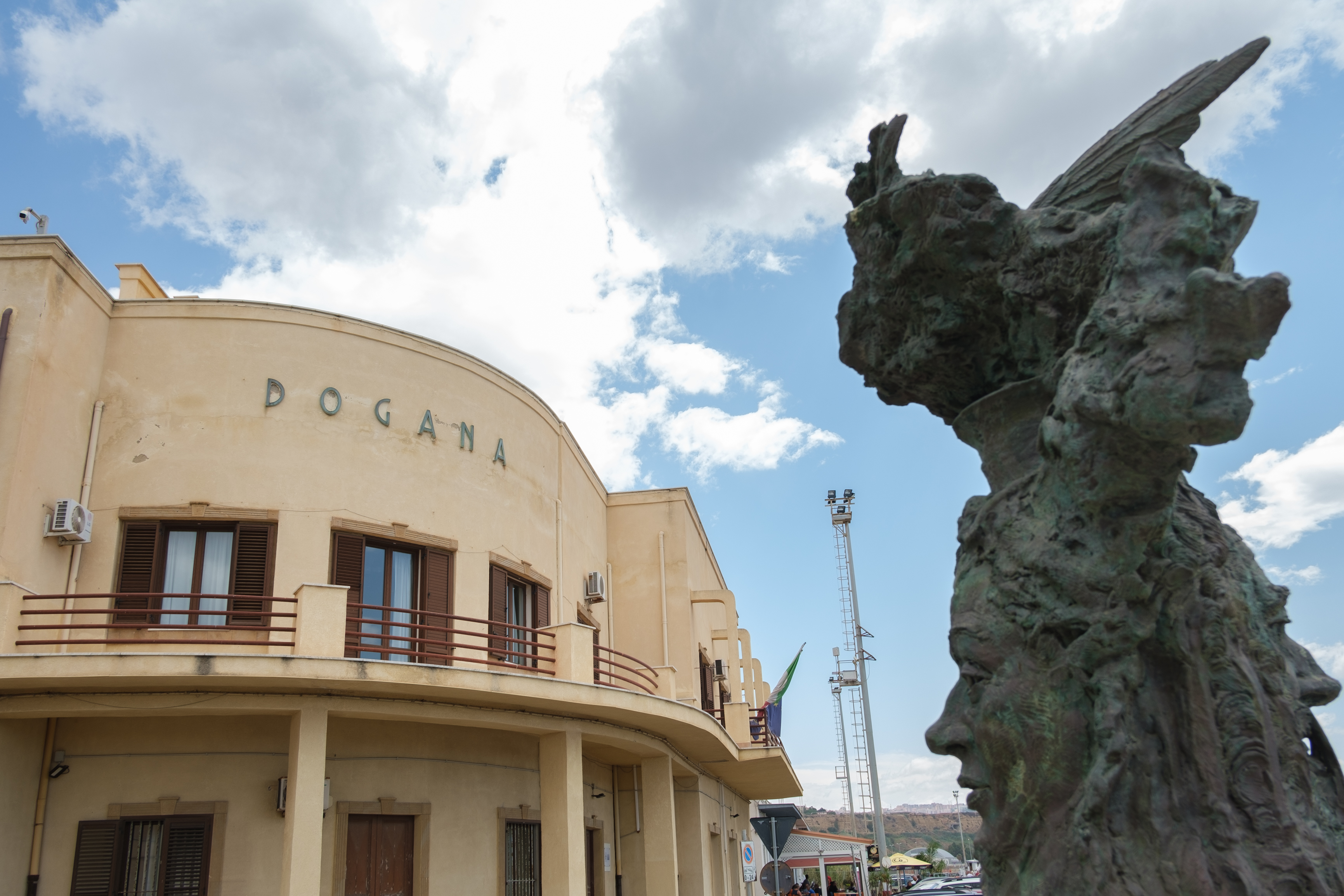
Customs

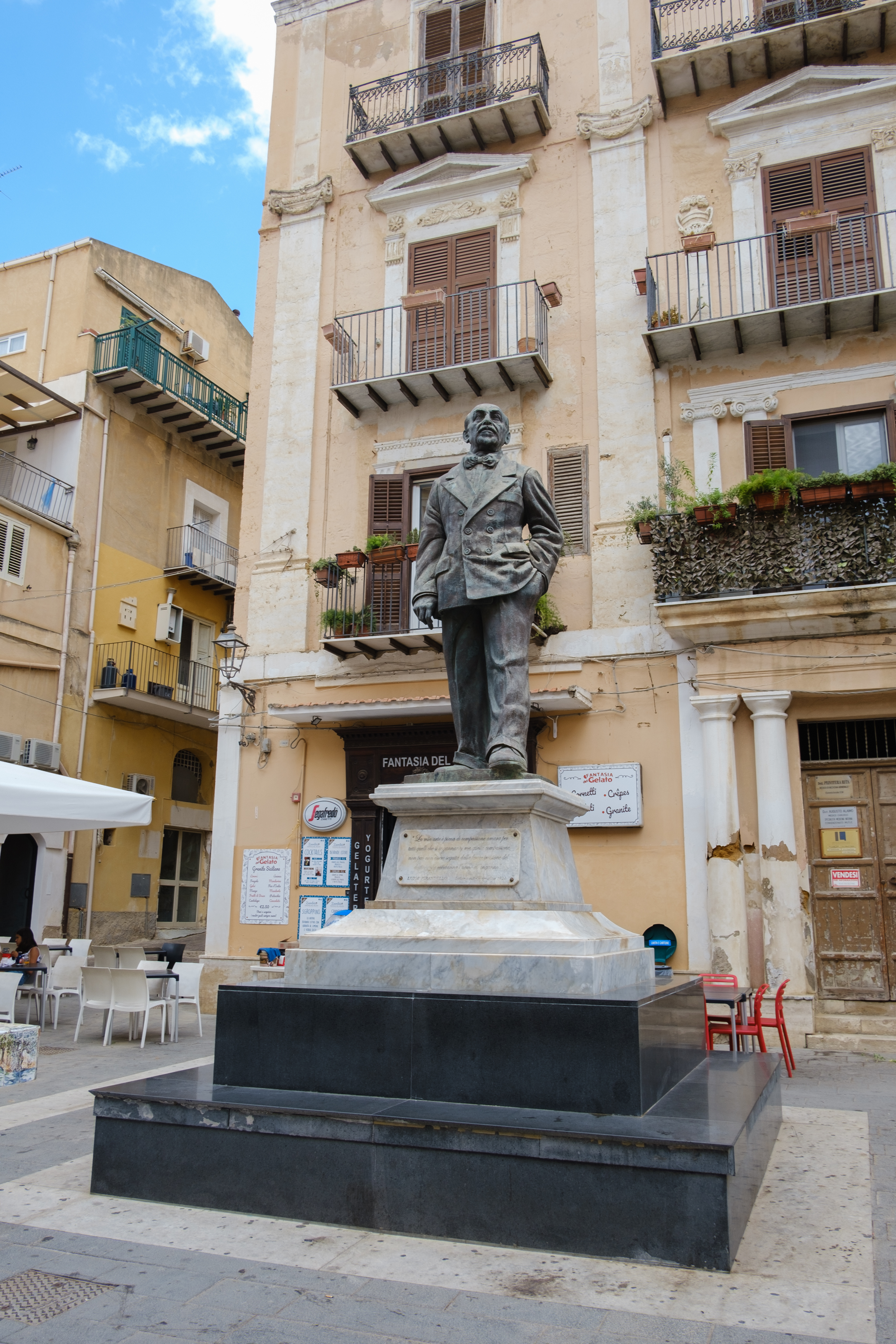
Statue of Luigi Pirandello

== See also ==
- Sicilians
- Sulfur mining in Sicily
- Railway network of Sicily
