= Scala dei Turchi =

Rocky cliff on the coast of Realmonte, southern Sicily, Italy

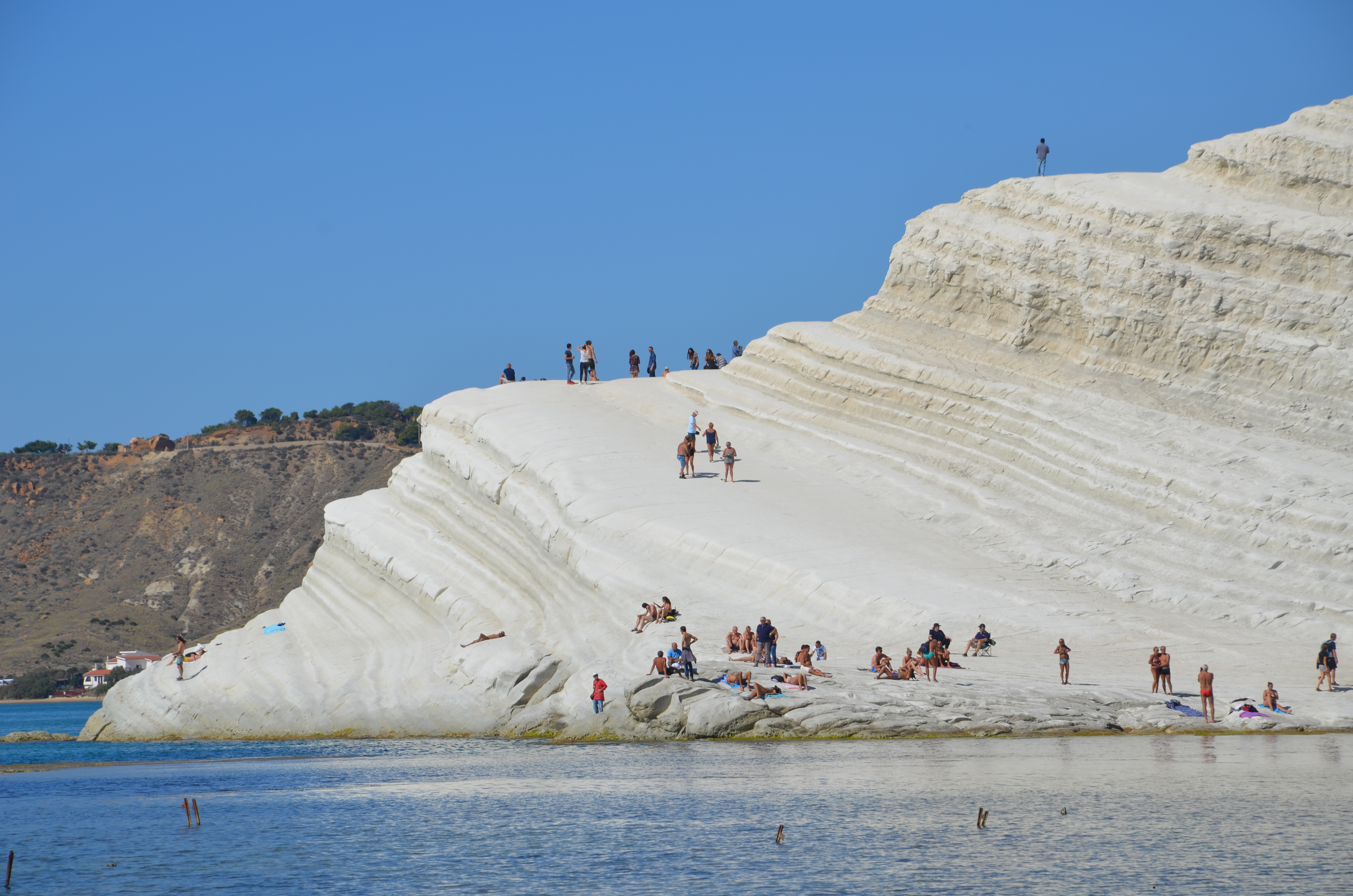
Scala dei Turchi.

The Scala dei Turchi (Italian: "Stair of the Turks" or "Turkish Steps") is a rocky cliff on the coast of Realmonte, near Porto Empedocle, southern Sicily, Italy. It has become a tourist attraction, partly due to its mention in Andrea Camilleri's series of detective stories about Commissario Montalbano.

The Scala is formed by marl, a sedimentary rock with a characteristic white color, formed from the tests of planktonic foraminifera. They belong to the Trubi Formation, a marine sedimentary unit of Lower Pliocene (Zanclean) age, which were deposited after the Zanclean flood, in which the Mediterranean refilled after having previously nearly completely desiccated during the Messinian salinity crisis. The cliffs lie between two sandy beaches and are a limestone rock formation in the shape of a staircase, hence the name. The latter part of the name derives from the frequent piracy raids by the Saracens during the Middle Ages, and Barbary pirates, called Turks, because the Ottoman Empire (1299–1922) also encompassed North Africa; the Turkish pirates, in fact, found shelter in this area less beaten by the winds and represented a safer landing and boarding place.

In August 2007 the municipality of Realmonte applied for the inclusion of the Scala dei Turchi (together with the nearby Roman Villa Aurea) in the UNESCO Heritage List.

In February 2020, following years of complaints about the poor environmental protection of the site from erosion and vandalism by tourists, Italian prosecutors seized control of the site. They ordered its temporary closure for monitoring and announced that they were investigating a man who claimed ownership of the site in a dispute with the Realmonte local authority.

In January 2022, the site was stained red by vandals.

Today, the surrounding area, characterized by a hot-summer Mediterranean climate, operates under a strict ecotourism management model to combat erosion. Direct climbing is prohibited, and beach access is regulated through timed tickets. Visitors often combine their trip with the nearby Belvedere viewpoint and the newly restored Villa Romana di Durrueli, enriching the region's cultural tourism.

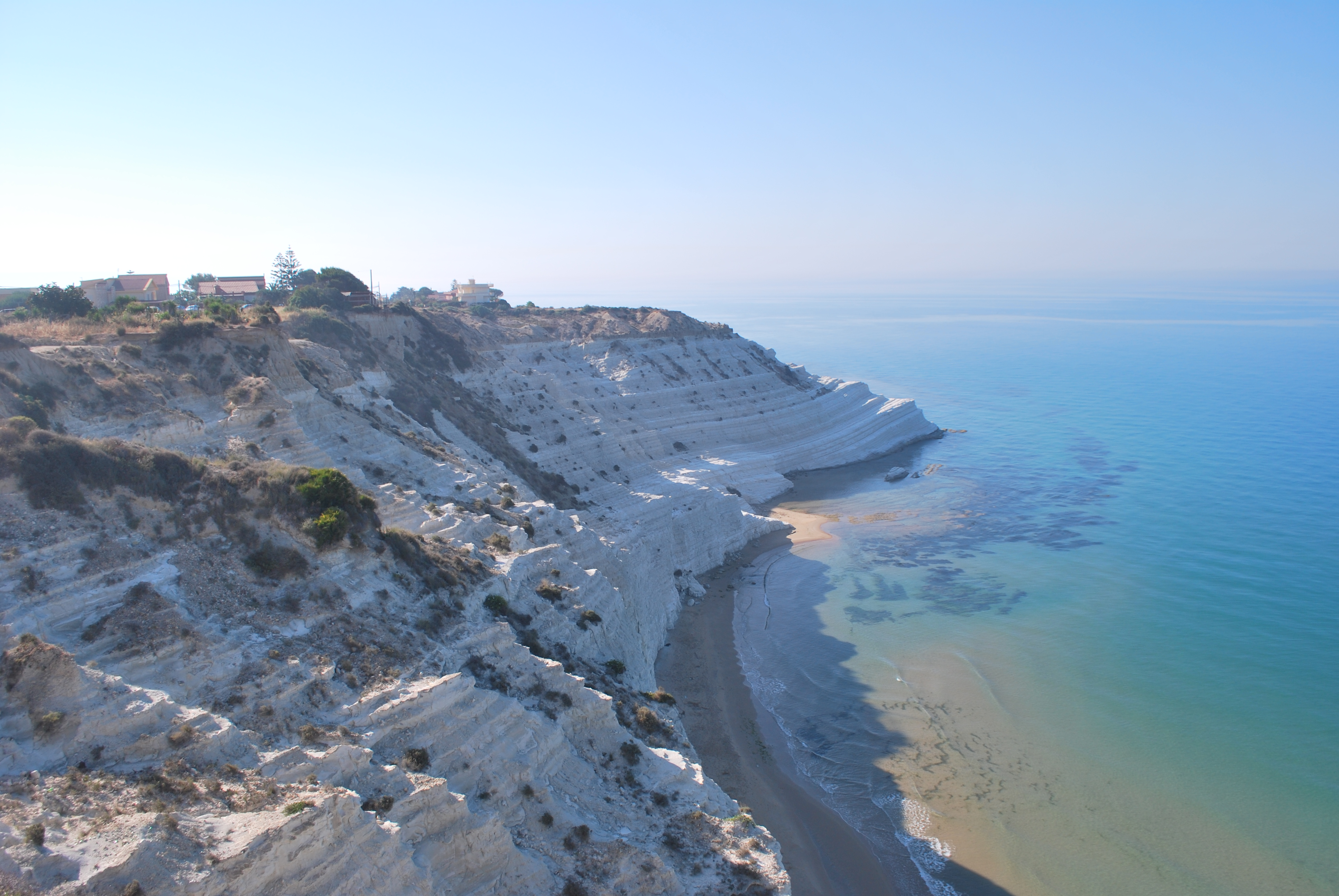
Scala dei Turchi.

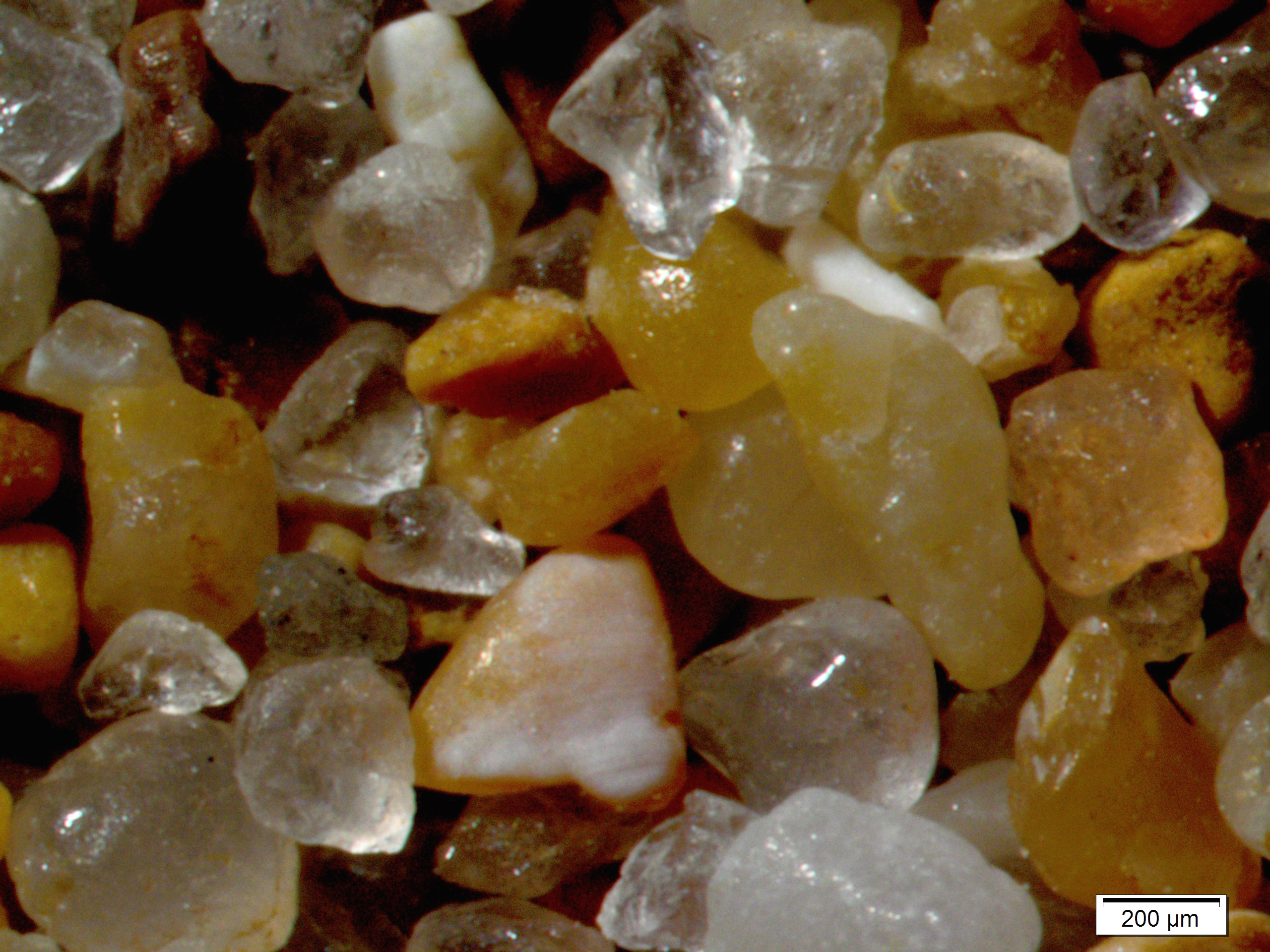
Sand from the beach at Scala dei Turchi. It is primarily made of quartz and shell fragments.

== Etymology ==
Scala dei Turchi Sicilia

The name Scala dei Turchi translates from Italian as "Stair of the Turks" (or "Turkish Steps"). The designation is a compound of two elements reflecting the site's physical geography and linguistic history. The word scala (staircase or steps) refers to the undulating, terraced rock layers of white marl that form a natural rampart rising from the sea. The term Turchi (Turks) stems from a long-standing linguistic habit in Sicily. Following the Arab rule of Sicily (827–1072), local populations used the word "Turk" as a blanket term for almost any Muslim raider, corsair, or stranger arriving from the sea, regardless of their actual ethnic origin (which was often Arab or Berber).Thus, the name immortalises the era when Ottoman-aligned maritime raiders frequented this stretch of coast.

== Location ==
Map of comune of Porto Empedocle (province of Agrigento, region Sicily, Italy)

The cliff is situated along the southwestern coast of Sicily at coordinates 37°17′24″N 13°28′22″E, within the administrative boundaries of the Realmonte municipality. It lies between two elongated, golden sandy beaches that border the open waters of the Mediterranean Sea.

The surrounding physical landscape consists of soft marine hills that descend directly into the shoreline. These terraced cliffs rise up to several tens of meters above sea level, providing natural panoramic vistas over the sea. Maritime access is facilitated by the low-gradient coastal shelf flanking the promontory.

Although the formation remains easily accessible from the nearby port town of Porto Empedocle, direct road connections primarily follow the regional coastal routes of Agrigento.

== Geology ==
=== Formation and composition ===
Sedimentary Rock Layers at Scala dei Turchi 1

The Scala dei Turchi is formed predominantly of pure white marl, and this sedimentary rock consists of a delicate mixture of calcium carbonate and clay. The white matrix contains dense accumulations of microscopic fossils, and these microfossil tests originate from planktonic "foraminifera" that inhabited ancient oceanic waters.

Stratigraphically, the cliff belongs to the Lower "Pliocene" geological unit designated as the "Trubi Formation". These layers were deposited after the dramatic refilling of the Mediterranean basin during the "Zanclean flood", which ended the "Messinian salinity crisis". The distinct horizontal banding visible across the terraces reflects rhythmic Milankovitch cycles, which altered marine sedimentation patterns through orbital variations.

=== Erosion and conservation ===
Scala dei Turchi (38046687601)

Due to the soft composition of the marly layers, the rock face is subject to constant marine weathering, and wave impact readily sculpts the base of the formation. Rain runoff continuously carves the cliff terraces into rounded steps, while adjacent beaches receive quartz and shell sand washed in by surrounding currents.

The stepped profile owes much to the uneven hardness of the rock, because wind and water wear down the soft marl more quickly than the more resistant limestone layers. One travel guide adds that the white surface stays cool to the touch even on very hot days. Few formations of this kind exist in Sicily, and Punta Bianca, in the same province of Agrigento, is the closest comparable site.

The wider area is also notable for its mineral resources. A short distance from the cliff lies the Realmonte salt mine, one of three still active in Sicily, which produces high-quality rock salt and kainite, a mineral used to make fertilisers. Because the marl is so soft, the cliff itself continues to retreat through natural weathering and visitor pressure, which is why its protection has become central to how it is managed.

== History ==
=== Piracy and coastal defense ===
Torre di Monterosso

Geographically, the Scala dei Turchi offered tactical advantages for maritime marauders between the sixteenth and early nineteenth centuries. The bay's natural orientation provided crucial shelter from harsh northern winds, creating a calm anchorage for pirate vessels. Furthermore, the cliff’s stepped limestone formation functioned as a natural staircase, facilitating effortless boarding and disembarkation from the water. Operating from this discreet, lightly patrolled haven, raiding parties could launch surprise overland incursions against nearby inland settlements, such as present-day Realmonte, and retreat to the sea before regional defensive forces could mobilize.

To counter these threats, Sicilian authorities under Charles V constructed a formidable defensive network of approximately 140 coastal watchtowers, complemented by mounted patrols designed to relay rapid alarm messages. Even with these fortifications, pirate incursions remained a localized threat. A documented episode occurred on 8 August 1803, when corsairs scaled the marl terraces under the cover of darkness to plunder livestock and goods. On this occasion, vigilant villagers alerted Bourbon coastal guards, who intercepted the raiding party and drove them back to their ships.

=== Local folklore ===
Beyond this turbulent maritime history, the promontory's legacy is softened by local folklore. A regional legend tells the tragic story of two lovers, known as 'u Zitu and 'a Zita, whose enduring bond is immortalized by twin rocks rising from the adjacent sea where they perished.

== Climate ==
Köppen classification Csa

Scala dei Turchi experiences a hot-summer Mediterranean climate (Köppen classification Csa), typical of Sicily's southern coast.The climate is classified as Csa according to Köppen and Geiger, with an average annual temperature of 17.1 °C across the four seasons, visitors will likely experience mild, wet winters and hot, dry summers, with spring and autumn serving as comfortable transitional periods. Summer, particularly July and August, brings high temperatures often rising above 30 °C with minimal rainfall, while winter from December to February is cooler, with average temperatures around 9–11 °C and an increase in rainy days, though November is typically the wettest month of the year. The temperature range between January and August spans roughly 9.4 °C to 26.1 °C on average, with average maximum temperatures in the hottest months reaching 31.5–31.9 °C and minimum nighttime temperatures around 20.4–20.8 °C; the coolest temperatures, by contrast, typically stay below 14 °C in January and February. Sea temperatures peak at around 24–28 °C in early-to-mid August, making the summer months ideal for swimming along the coastline. Given this climatic zone, the best months to visit Scala dei Turchi are May, June, and September, when weather conditions typically offer warm, sunny days without the peak-season heat or crowds of July and August.

== Tourism ==
=== Visitor access and regulations ===
Scala dei Turchi is a prominent tourist destination along the southern coast of Sicily near Realmonte. The site gained widespread popularity through its inclusion in Andrea Camilleri's Commissario Montalbano literature series. Due to its fragile marl geology and incidents of vandalism—most notably in 2022 when the cliff was stained with red powder—the site operates under a strict ecotourism management model. Direct climbing onto the white rock has been prohibited since 2020 to prevent further erosion and ensure safety.

Agrigento lido rossello

Access to the adjacent beach, known as Ingresso alla Scala dei Turchi, is reached via descending paths from the coastal road or neighboring beaches like Lido Rossello. Under current regulations, entry is tightly controlled with a €5 ticket, limiting visitors to 60-minute time slots and a maximum of 35 people per group, though residents, school groups, and researchers enter free. From the sand or the water, visitors can view and photograph the formation's stark contrast against the golden beach and turquoise Mediterranean Sea.

=== Nearby attractions ===
Realmonte - villa romana di Realmonte

For those not descending to the beach, the formation can be admired from coastal boat excursions or the Belvedere Scala dei Turchi. Inaugurated by the FAI in 2016, this elevated public viewpoint along the coastal road offers sweeping panoramas without requiring a descent and is particularly popular at sunset.

Scala dei Turchi, view from the Belvedere FAI

Cultural tourism in the area is anchored by the Villa Romana di Durrueli, a first-century AD maritime villa. Located a few hundred metres from the cliff near the mouth of the Cottone river, between Punta Piccola and Punta Grande, it was discovered by chance in December 1907 during the construction of the Porto Empedocle–Siculiana railway. The villa features intact thermal baths divided into male and female sections around a central cistern. Archaeologist Antonio Salinas uncovered its well-preserved black-and-white mosaic floors in 1908, which include coloured scenes of sea gods such as Poseidon riding a sea horse. Roof tile stamps suggest the property belonged to Publius Annius, a member of a prominent Agrigento family. Following restoration funded by the Valle dei Templi Archaeological Park, the open-air museum reopened with free entry on 1 June 2023.Authorities plan to establish a joint visitor route connecting the villa with the Scala dei Turchi; although initially stalled by an ownership dispute, the private owner donated the cliff to the municipality of Realmonte in 2023, allowing the unified cultural itinerary to proceed.

Tourists at Scala dei Turchi

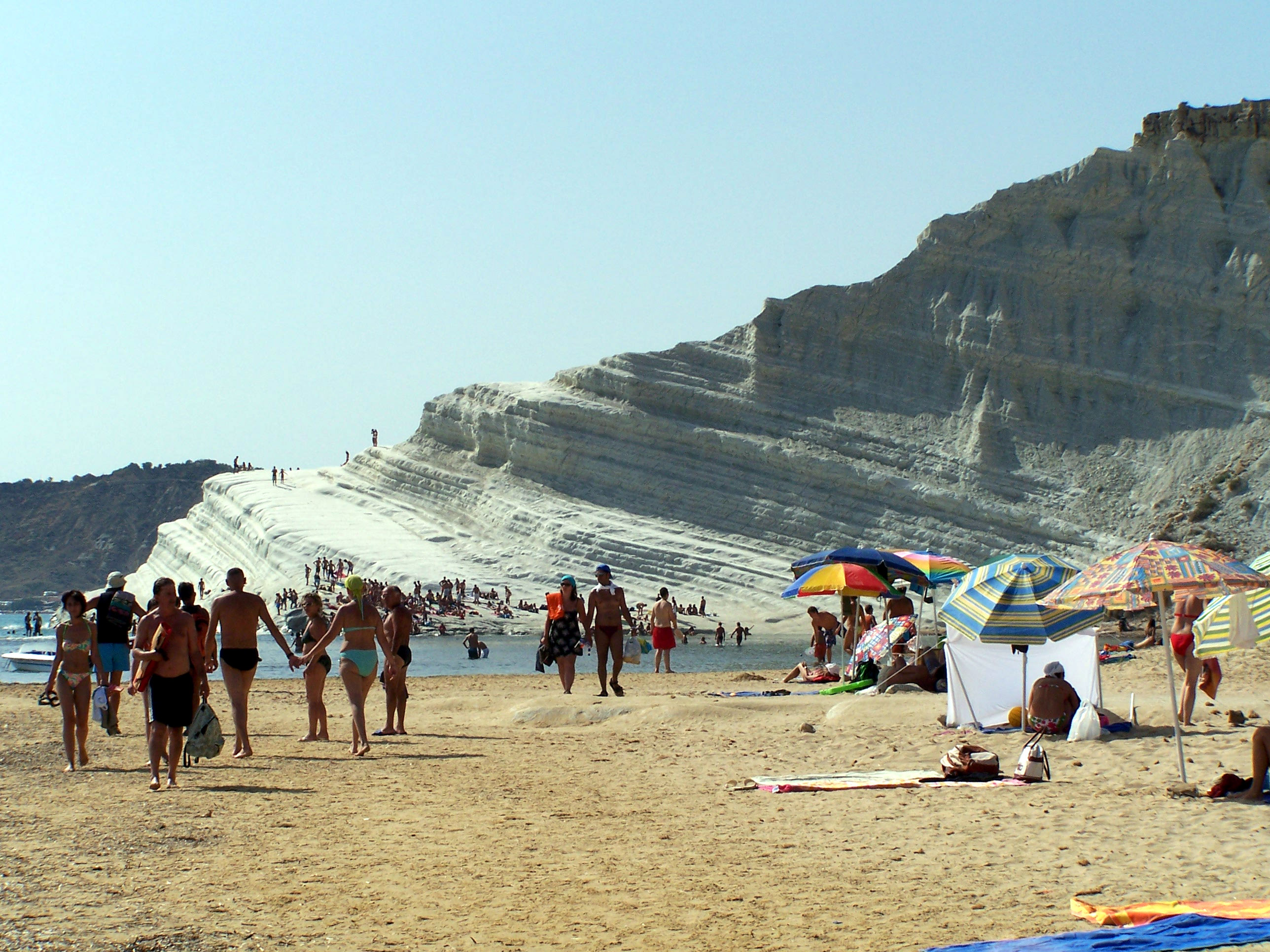
