= Montreal Metro (disambiguation) =

The Montreal Metro (Métro de Montréal) is the subway system of Montreal, Quebec, Canada.

Montreal Metro, Metro Montreal, or variations may also refer to:

- Métro (Montreal newspaper), a.k.a. Montréal Métro, a free daily French-language newspaper in Montreal, Quebec, Canada
- Greater Montreal (GMA; also Montreal Metro Region or Metro Montreal), the metropolitan region of Montreal, Quebec, Canada
  - Montreal Metropolitan Community (MMC/CMM), the regional government of the metropolitan region of Montreal
  - Urban agglomeration of Montreal (UAM/AUM), the regional government of the Island of Montreal
  - Montreal Urban Community (MUC/CUM), the former regional government of the Island of Montreal
  - Montreal (region) (region #6), the subprovincial-level division containing the Island of Montreal, including Montreal County (compte de Montreal), the former county-level division of the province of Quebec

== See also ==
- Metro (disambiguation)
- Montreal (disambiguation)
- Réseau express métropolitain, the rapid transit light rail system of Montreal, Quebec, Canada
- Montreal bus rapid transit, the former and future BRT system of Montreal, Quebec, Canada
