= HMS Minorca (1779) =

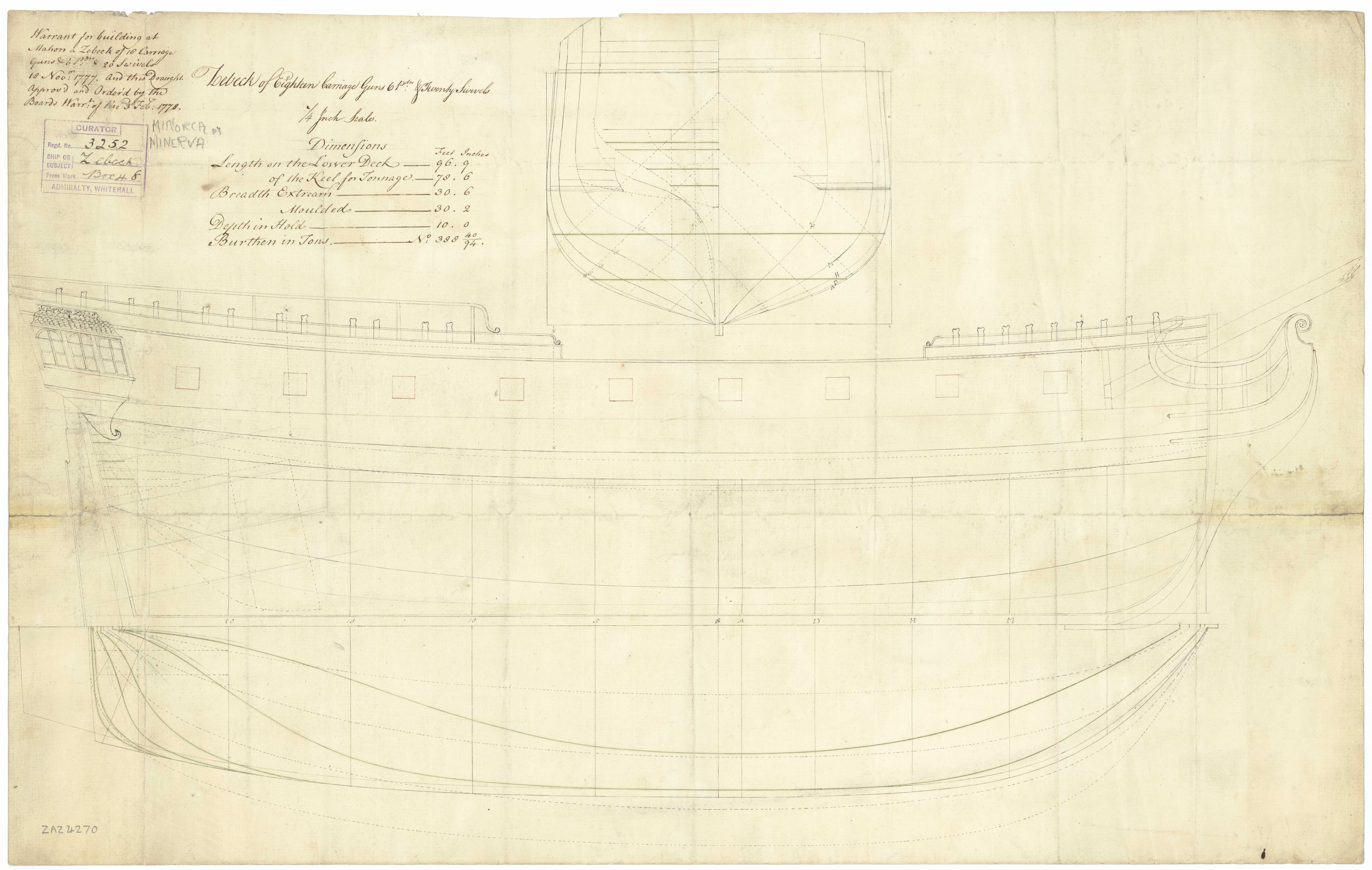
- A plan body drawing of HMS Minorca dated 1778 from the collection of the National Maritime Museum, Greenwich, London.

History

Great Britain
- Name: HMS Minorca
- Ordered: October 1777
- Laid down: February 1778
- Launched: 29 August 1779
- Fate: Scuttled 1781

General characteristics
- Type: Xebec
- Tons burthen: 38840/94 (bm)
- Length: Overall: 96 ft 9 in (29.5 m); Keel: 78 ft 6 in (23.9 m)
- Beam: 30 ft 6 in (9.3 m)
- Depth of hold: 10 ft 0 in (3.0 m)
- Crew: 130
- Armament: Upper deck:18 × 6-pounder guns + 18 × ½-pounder swivel guns; QD:2 × 6-pounder guns + 6 × 6-pounder carronades

HMS Minorca was a xebec-rigged vessel that the British Royal Navy had built at Port Mahon Dockyard, Menorca (historically called "Minorca" by the British) in 1779. She participated in one major engagement in 1780. The Navy scuttled her in 1781.

== Career ==
Minorca was built with a sloop hull, but broader. She was rigged as a xebec, with square-rigged and lateen sails. The Navy classified her as a ship-sloop. Commander the Honourable Charles S. Conway commissioned her in June 1778. On 4 March 1779, Patrick Leslie was promoted to Commander into Minorca, replacing Conway. Leslie received promotion to post captain on 26 January 1780. His replacement was Commander Charles Knowles, who received a promotion to post captain and command of HMS Porcupine on 4 February. Knowles' replacement was Lieutenant, later Commander, Hugh Lawson.

On 30 July 1780 Minorca and Porcupine engaged the French frigate Montreal off the Barbary coast. The two-hour engagement was indecisive. Porcupine and Minorca withdrew because even if Montreal had struck, they could not have taken her off. Also, three other ships had appeared on the horizon. The French lost four killed, including their captain. The English had five killed and two wounded; two of the dead were on Minorca.

== Fate ==
The Royal Navy sank Minorca on 21 August 1781 to block the entrance to the harbour at Port Mahon.
