= Mount Royal station =

Mount Royal station, Mont Royal station, etc., may refer to:

- Mont-Royal station (Montreal Metro), in Montreal, Quebec, Canada
- Ville-de-Mont-Royal station, a light metro station in Mount Royal, Quebec, Canada
- Mt. Royal/MICA station, a Baltimore Light RailLink station adjacent to the historic Mount Royal Station in Baltimore, Maryland, United States
- Mount Royal Station (Maryland Institute College of Art), a university building and historically a station on the Baltimore and Ohio Railroad in Baltimore, Maryland, United States

== See also ==
- Mount Royal (disambiguation)
