= HMS Montreal =

Three ships of the Royal Navy have borne the name HMS Montreal, after the Canadian city of Montreal:

- HMS Montreal (1761) was a 32-gun fifth rate launched in 1761. She was captured by the French in 1779 and subsequently destroyed by the Anglo-French forces at Toulon in 1793.
- HMS Montreal was a 20-gun sloop launched as HMS Wolfe in 1813 and renamed HMS Montreal in 1814. She was sold in 1832.
- HMS Montreal (1839) was a schooner serving on the Canadian lakes. She was purchased in 1839 and sold in 1848.

== See also ==
- HMCS Montreal
- French frigate Montréal
