= HMCS Donnacona =

- Active: 1923 to present
- Country: Canada
- Branch: Royal Canadian Navy
- Type: Naval Reserve Division
- Role: Reserve unit
- Size: Approx. 395
- Garrison/HQ: 3525 Saint-Jacques Street, Montreal
- Mottos: "Hand on hand" and "main dans la main"
- Colours: Black and vermilion
- Equipment: 24 ft (7.3 m) RHIB (ZH-733 CDO)
- Battle honours: None

HMCS Donnacona is a Royal Canadian Navy reserve division in Montreal, Quebec. Dubbed a stone frigate, HMCS Donnacona is a land-based naval establishment for training and recruitment primarily of part-time sailors for Canada's naval reserve.

== Operations ==
HMCS Donnacona's personnel provide on-going augmentation to Royal Canadian Navy operations and exercises on ships and at shore establishments on a full- and part-time basis.

Domestically, Donnacona contributes assets in the form of personnel and equipment to aid to the civil power operations. In the past, these have included the 1990 Oka Crisis, the 1995 G7 summit in Halifax, Nova Scotia, the 1997 Red River flood, the 1998 Ice Storm, the 1998 crash of Swissair Flight 111, the 2010 Winter Olympics in Vancouver, British Columbia, and the 2011 floods on the Richelieu River in Quebec and throughout Manitoba.

Throughout the Cold War, Donnacona provided hundreds of trained augmentees in support of naval and joint operations, as well as to the Korean War and the First Gulf War. The unit also provided personnel to the Afghanistan war and subsequent training mission, and to numerous United Nations peacekeeping missions and NATO operations.

During the Second World War, HMCS Donnacona served as the Royal Canadian Navy's principal recruiting and initial training depot in what was then Canada's largest city, ultimately enrolling, instructing and temporarily housing many thousands of sailors throughout the war. During the war's demobilization phase, these sailors were formally discharged at the unit.

== History ==
In 1923, the first company of the Royal Canadian Volunteer Naval Reserve was formed in Montreal. The unit was originally housed at 465 Sherbrooke Street West, a converted private residence, until 1935, and then at a Bell Canada building at 1057 Mountain Street until 1939. In August 1939 the unit moved to 1046 Mountain Street – again another old Bell property, but a much more appropriate one with a pillared main entrance and space for an indoor drill deck.

At the outbreak of the Second World War the unit was split into two co-located divisions to accommodate the high recruiting intake: HMCS Cartier for francophones and HMCS Montreal for English speakers. In 1941 the units were merged again as HMCS Montreal and in 1943 this division was moved to 2055 Drummond Street (the building of the old Montreal Winter Club curling rink) and re-commissioned HMCS Donnacona.

In 1943, the new name of the Naval Reserve division was chosen to be used as the name of the ship featured in the film Corvette K-225, featuring Randolph Scott and Ella Raines. In 1944, HMCS Donnacona's football team (combined with players from HMCS Hyacinthe, also in Montreal) won the Grey Cup, beating the Hamilton Wildcats 7–6 at the Civic Stadium to bring the cup to Montreal for only the second time.

In the summer of 2007, HMCS Donnacona was moved to a new purpose-built federal government facility at 3525 Saint Jacques Street shared with the Royal Canadian Mounted Police and the Canada Border Services Agency. Unlike many other Naval Reserve Divisions, HMCS Donnacona is not located near a body of water.

In 2019, the Band of HMCS Donnacona was reinstated as one of six Naval Reserve bands in Canada.

== See also ==
- Canadian Forces
- Royal Canadian Navy
- Stone frigate
