= HMCS Cartier =

Canadian surveying ship

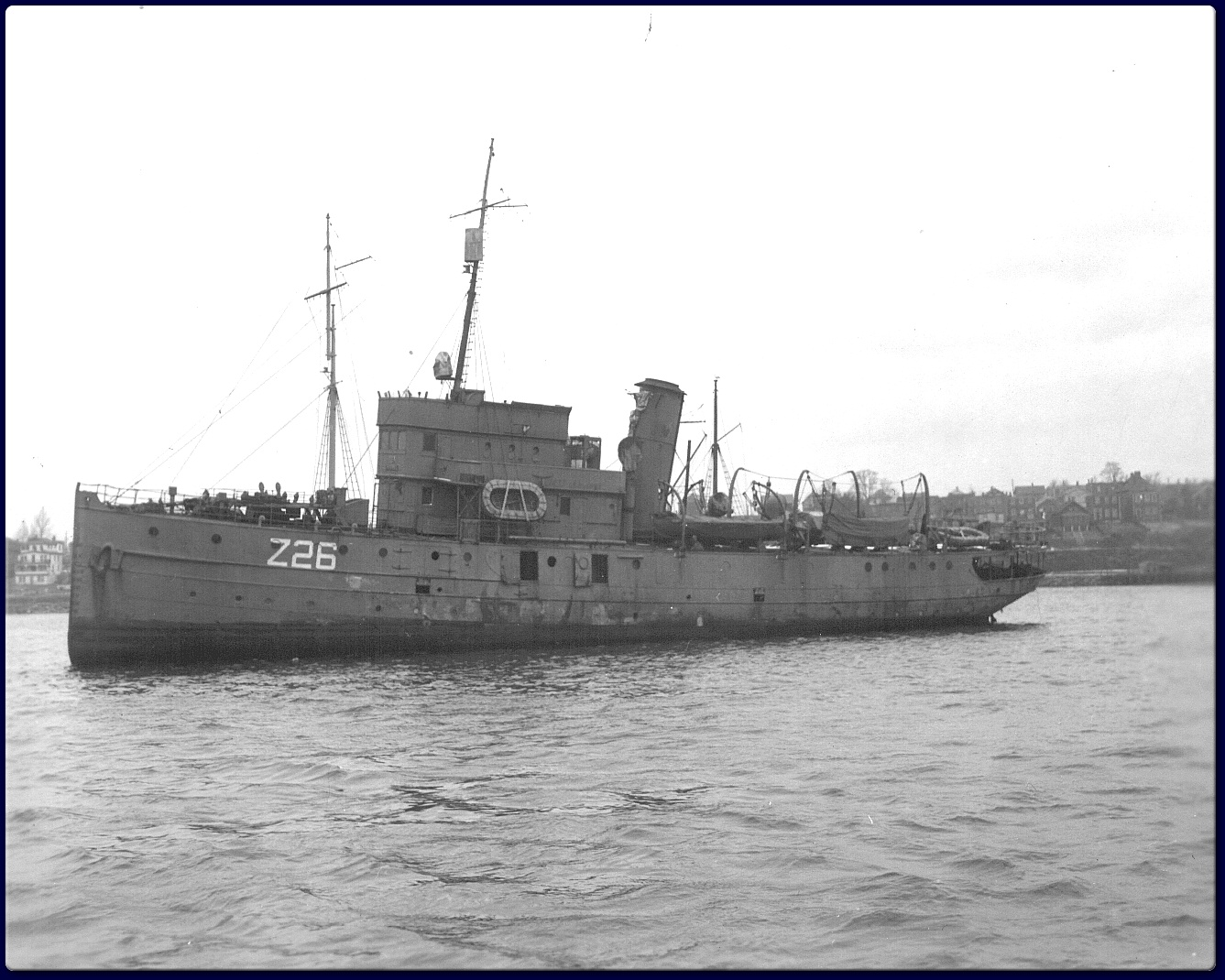
- Undated photograph of HMCS Cartier/HMCS Charny, possibly circa 1939-1941.

History

Canada
- Name: Cartier
- Builder: Swan Hunter, Tyne and Wear
- Laid down: 1908
- Launched: 13 January 1910
- Commissioned: 18 September 1939 as HMCS Cartier; 9 December 1941 as HMCS Charny
- Decommissioned: 12 December 1945
- Fate: Scuttled, 1957

General characteristics
- Displacement: 556 tons
- Length: 164 ft (50 m)
- Beam: 29 ft (8.8 m)
- Draught: 13 ft (4.0 m)
- Speed: 8 kn (15 km/h; 9.2 mph)
- Complement: 60
- Armament: 3 × 12-pounders

HMCS Cartier was a commissioned surveying ship of the Royal Canadian Navy and saw service during World War I and World War II.

== Pre-naval service ==
She was built as CGS Cartier for service as a hydrographic survey ship by Swan, Hunter & Wigham Richardson, at Newcastle upon Tyne, between 1908 and 1910.

She saw many duties as a ship belonging to the Dominion government. She was utilized by Canada, France, the United States and England while under the Dominion Flag on the East Coast of Canada, and throughout the Atlantic, charting and taking soundings. Cartier was used to chart some of the most dangerous coastal waters into Iceland and the Dominion of Newfoundland. She was also contracted to assist in Marine insurance Investigations.

== World War I ==
During World War I, CGS Cartier supported the Royal Canadian Navy (RCN) and was converted to an armed patrol and training vessel for junior officers. However, she was not commissioned into the RCN, and maintained her civilian name as she remained a Dominion asset. The Dominion Government was responsible for her upkeep, as well as arming and manning her. The RCN provided the personnel, however the Dominion government paid them separately from the naval service's budget.

== Inter-war service ==
CGS Cartier returned to her former service as a hydrographic survey vessel which included work on the Atlantic coast. Her ability to chart exact locations was used extensively to curb smuggling operations and Dominion law enforcement used her as a platform for anti-smuggling operations, resulting in timely searches of suspected smugglers. Notwithstanding this role, she was forever a survey vessel first and foremost.

== World War II ==
During World War II, CGS Cartier was formally commissioned into the RCN on 18 September 1939, becoming HMCS Cartier. HMCS Cartier became a training ship and then an armed coastal patrol ship before returning to training duties. As a training ship, her hydrographic survey instrumentation saw use in educating officers and crew for Advanced Navigation and Naval Mine Avoidance Navigation.

On 9 December 1941, HMCS Cartier was renamed HMCS Charny, likely to avoid confusion with the French-language naval reserve unit in Montreal, NCSM Cartier. By special dispensation of the Dominion Government, she was given the rare honour of being allowed to continue to fly her commissioning pennant that she received as HMCS Cartier. From this time on, Charny was used as a training vessel and research vessel. She was twice mentioned in despatches (MID), and was entitled to paint two oak leaves on her funnels. The MIDs were for her assistance in radar research as a target and tracking vessel. At various times, she was fitted with temporary radar sets and advanced communication gear, but only for testing purposes.

Upon being paid off, Charny was no longer considered viable, and she was deemed surplus. In 1957, she was scuttled as a derelict, offshore of Sydney, Nova Scotia.

== See also ==
- Royal Canadian Sea Cadets
