= HMCS Royal Mount =

Several units of the Royal Canadian Navy have been named HMCS Royal Mount.

- HMCS Royal Mount (K685), a River-class frigate renamed Buckingham before commissioning. The ship served in the Battle of the Atlantic during the Second World War.
- HMCS Royal Mount (K677), a River-class frigate, ordered as Alvington and renamed before commissioning. The ship served in the Battle of the Atlantic during the Second World War.

== Battle honours ==
- Atlantic, 1944–45.
