= Cordillera Real =

Cordillera Real is the name of mountain chains in the Andes of South America:

- Cordillera Real (Ecuador)
- Cordillera Real (Bolivia)
