= Montreal Convention (disambiguation) =

The Montreal Convention is a multilateral treaty for the unification of certain rules for international carriage by air.

Montreal Convention may also refer to:

- Convention for the Suppression of Unlawful Acts against the Safety of Civil Aviation, 1971
- Montreal Protocol, a 1987 environmental protocol designed to protect the ozone layer
- Montreal Protocol for the Suppression of Unlawful Acts of Violence at Airports serving International Civil Aviation, 1988
- The Montreal Declaration of Anglican Essentials Canada, 1994
- Declaration of Montreal, a 2006 statement on Lesbian, Gay, Bisexual, and Transgender Human Rights

== See also ==
- Great Peace of Montreal
