= Sir Charles Knowles, 2nd Baronet =

Royal Navy Admiral (1754–1831)

Admiral Sir Charles Knowles GCB Bt
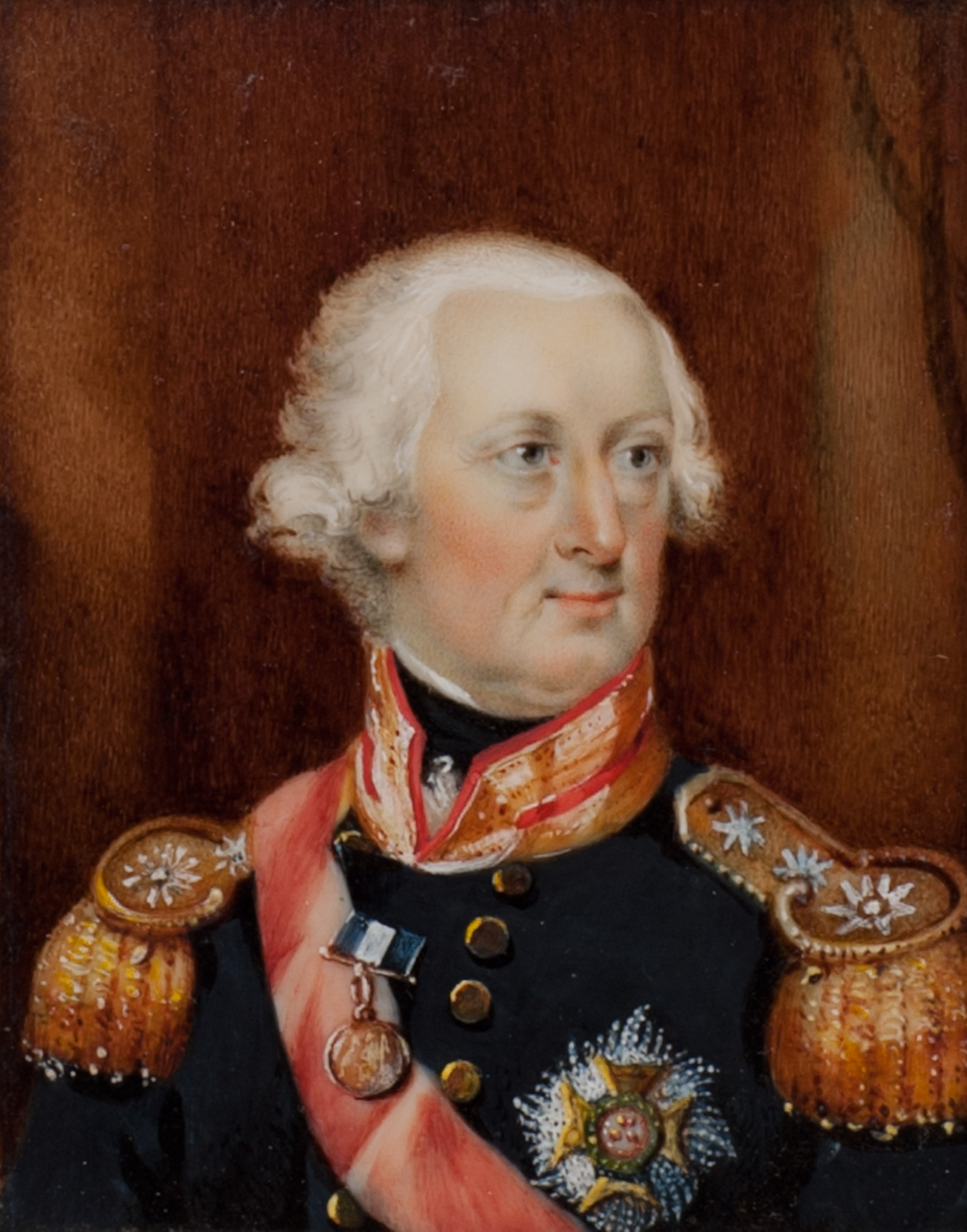
- Portrait of Knowles
- Born: 24 August 1754; Kingston, Jamaica
- Died: 28 November 1831 (aged 77)
- Relatives: Charles Knowles (father)
- Military career
- Allegiance: Great Britain; United Kingdom
- Branch: Royal Navy
- Service years: 1768–1831
- Rank: Admiral
- Commands: HMS Supply; HMS Minorca; HMS Porcupine; HMS San Miguel; HMS Daedalus; HMS Edgar; HMS Goliath; HMS Britannia
- Conflicts: American War of Independence; Battle of St. Lucia; Battle of Grenada; Relief of Gibraltar; French Revolutionary Wars; Battle of Cape St Vincent
- Awards: Naval Gold Medal; Knight Grand Cross of the Order of the Bath

Sir Charles Henry Knowles, 2nd Baronet, GCB (24 August 1754 – 28 November 1831) was an officer of the Royal Navy, who saw service during the American War of Independence, and the French Revolutionary and Napoleonic Wars, eventually rising to the rank of Admiral. He was an extraordinary figure and a great tactical innovator. Highly intellectual, he authored a number of signal books and had the chance to put his ideas into practice during his naval career. Knowles was at times beset by problems with discipline aboard his ships, often due to large proportions of raw recruits and untrained seamen. This may have been a factor in his rocky relationship with his superior, Sir John Jervis, which eventually led to Knowles's retirement from active service after the Battle of Cape St Vincent, and his concentration on scholarly studies of the issues affecting the naval service.

== Family and early life ==
Knowles was born at Kingston, Jamaica on 24 August 1754, the second son of the Governor of Jamaica Admiral Sir Charles Knowles and his wife Maria Magdalena Theresa de Bouget. He received his initial education at Eton College circa 1764–6, and then subsequently at Glasgow and Edinburgh. He joined in navy in 1768 as a midshipman aboard the 36-gun frigate HMS Venus, which was then serving in the English Channel under the command of Captain Samuel Barrington. He was then aboard the Spithead guard ship the 74-gun HMS Lenox under Captain Robert Roddam, before joining the 32-gun HMS Southampton under Captain John MacBride, where he served at Plymouth and in the Channel.

== West Indies ==
Knowles was appointed as acting-lieutenant without pay aboard the sloop HMS Diligence by Sir George Brydges Rodney in 1773, and Knowles went on to serve in this capacity aboard HMS Princess Amelia, HMS Portland and HMS Guadeloupe under Captain William Cornwallis at Pensacola and from Jamaica. He then moved aboard Captain Collins's 20-gun HMS Seaford where he served off Cap Francois and Santo Domingo. His next appointment was aboard Rear-Admiral Clark Gayton's flagship, the 50-gun HMS Antelope at Port Royal from 1774 to May 1776, from which he moved aboard the 20-gun HMS Squirrel under Captain Stair Douglas. Under Douglas Knowles served at Jamaica, the Mosquito Shore and the Bay of Honduras.

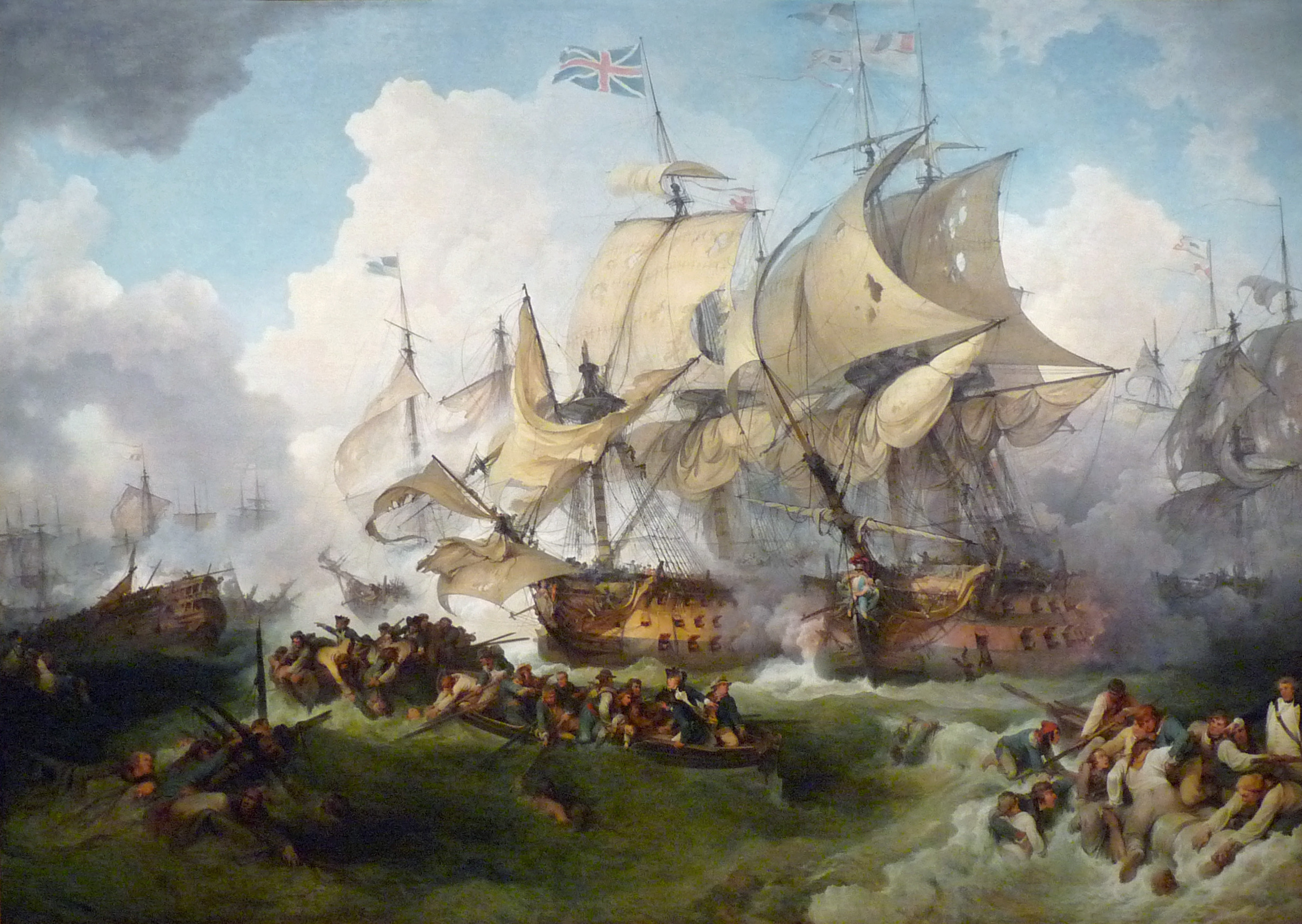
The Glorious First of June. Knowles claimed that Howe's tactics reflected his own theories on effective naval combat.

Knowles's commission was confirmed on 28 May 1776 and he was appointed as second lieutenant of the 28-gun HMS Boreas, then under the command of Captain Charles Thompson. He served aboard the Boreas at Port Royal, and later on the North American Station at New York after the Battle of Bunker Hill. He was promoted to first lieutenant and in 1776 moved aboard the 50-gun HMS Chatham, which was at that time the flagship of Vice-Admiral Molyneux Shuldham. He went on to see service on the flat boats at New York and Rhode Island. Knowles returned to Britain aboard HMS Asia in January 1777 to see his father, who was in declining health. Whilst at home he took the opportunity to prepare his first signal book, A Set of Signals for a Fleet on a Plan Entirely New, for publication, before returning to the Americas in summer 1777. The book, published that year, proposed innovative new ways of flying numbered signals, and the development of tactics whereby the traditional line of battle would be abandoned once the battle began. It has a real Nelsonic ring about it. “..the book as a whole seems an astonishing achievement for a young man of twenty-four - even with Nelson’s captaincy at the age of twenty in mind…..all mark Knowles as a true innovator". Knowles claimed to have communicated the work to Lord Howe, and that Howe's tactics at the Glorious First of June reflected Knowles's theories on effective naval tactics. The death of his father on 9 December that year and his succession as the second baronet caused Knowles to return to England again.

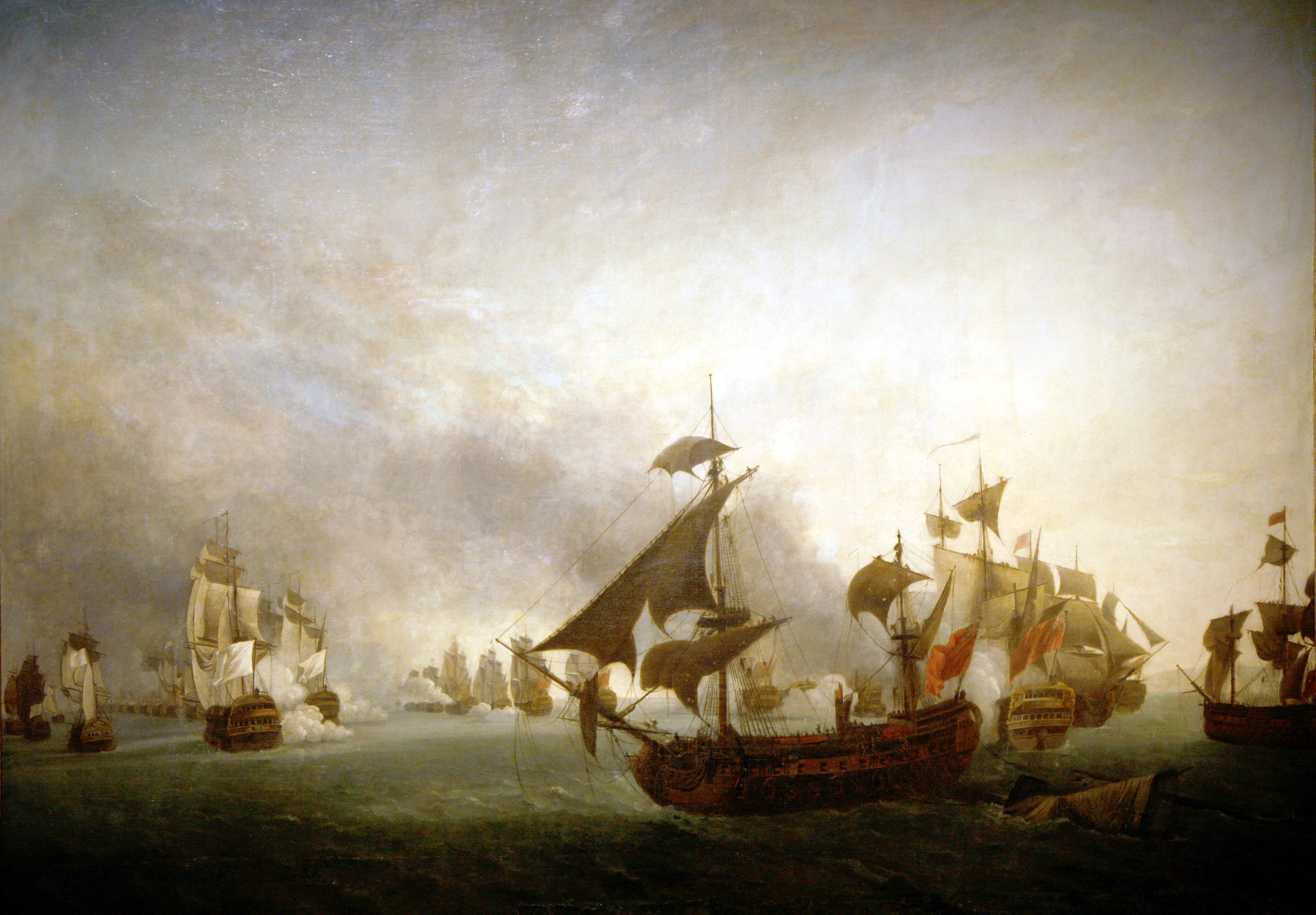
Battle of Grenada, by Jean-François Hue. Knowles was slightly wounded during the battle.

He returned to active service again during the summer of 1778, and was present with Barrington's fleet at the Battle of St. Lucia on 15 December 1778, serving aboard Commander James Richard Dacres's 18-gun HMS Ceres. Two days later the Ceres was chased and captured by a squadron under the comte d'Estaing. He was exchanged and appointed to serve as lieutenant aboard Vice-Admiral Barrington's flagship, the 74-gun HMS Prince of Wales. In May 1779 he was briefly ordered to be master and commander of the storeship HMS Supply, but had returned to the Prince of Wales by 6 July, when he took part and was wounded in the Battle of Grenada. Knowles returned to England with Barrington in October 1779, and by December had joined Admiral Sir George Rodney's flagship, the 90-gun HMS Sandwich, as a volunteer for the Relief of Gibraltar.

== Command ==
Rodney appointed him to command the 18-gun xebec HMS Minorca on 26 January 1780, quickly following this with a promotion to post-captain and an appointment to the 24-gun HMS Porcupine on 2 February. Knowles went on to serve in a highly active role in the defence of British trade in the Mediterranean, engaging privateers and escorting convoys. At one point he was briefly blockaded in Menorca, where he fell ill. He was eventually able to escape to sea in January 1781, and was based out of Gibraltar until his return to England in April 1782. On his arrival he was accused of piracy and murder, but was able to clear his name, returning to Gibraltar aboard HMS Britannia to resume command of the Porcupine. He became senior naval officer there on the departure of Sir Roger Curtis, until returning to England once more in command of the 74-gun Spanish prize HMS San Miguel.

=== French Revolutionary Wars ===
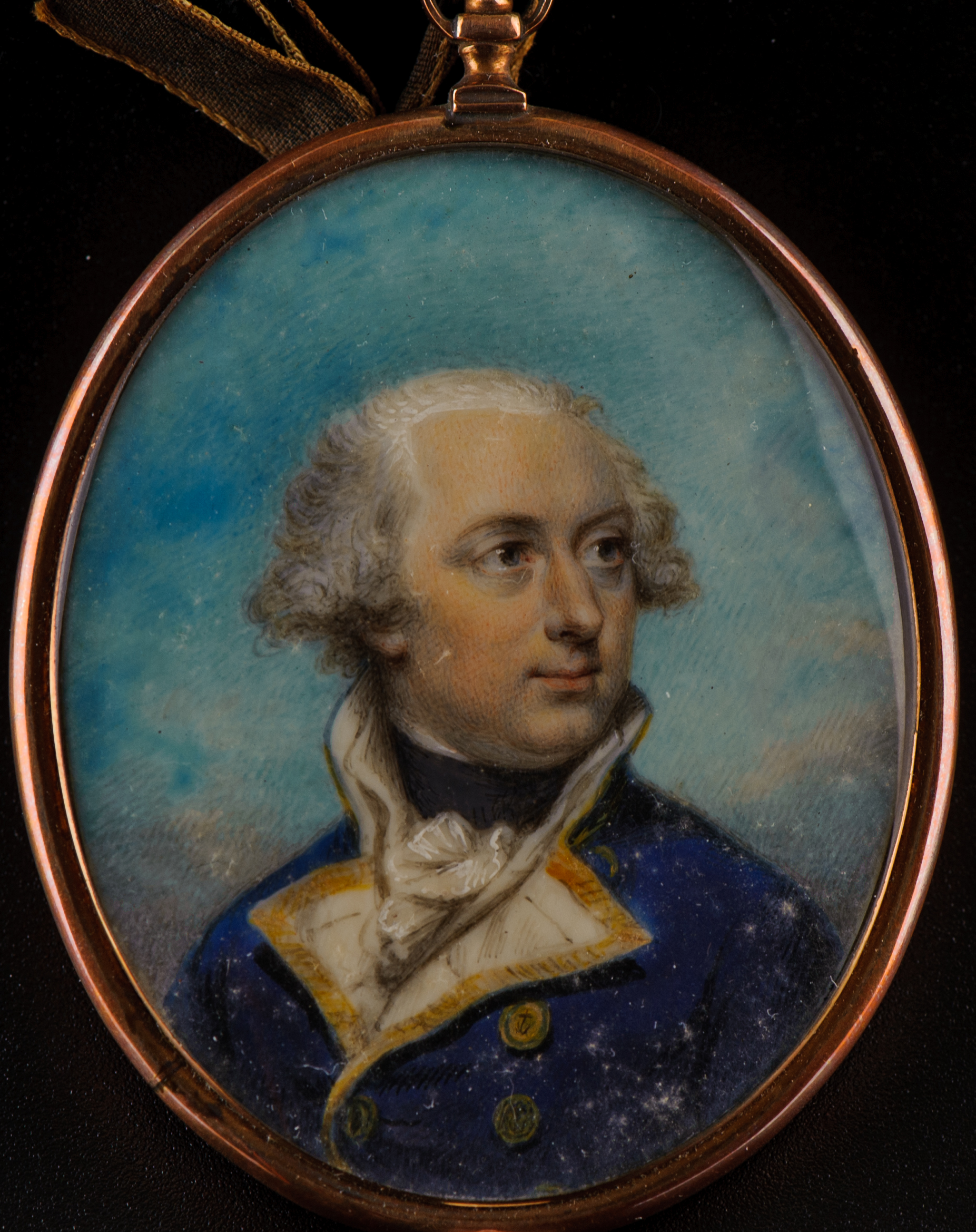
Miniature portrait of Knowles

The end of the war allowed Knowles to continue with his studies, and he made a tour of France in 1788. The outbreak of the French Revolutionary Wars in 1793 led to Knowles returning to active service in command of the 32-gun frigate HMS Daedalus. He was ordered to Halifax, but given permission to move to the Chesapeake, where a French convoy was planning to sail from. Problems with manning his ship meant that Knowles sailed from Portsmouth with a largely inexperienced crew, but Knowles was able to have them fully trained by the time of their arrival at Hampton Roads. Shortly after his arrival, the French escort arrived, and the convoy sailed shortly afterwards, observed by Knowles on the Daedalus. Knowles passed this latest information on to Lord Howe, who moved his Channel fleet to intercept it, setting in motion the events that would lead to the Glorious First of June. Having fulfilled his objective Knowles sailed to Halifax, and from there returned to England. He was appointed to the 74-gun HMS Edgar and served in the North Sea. Once again Knowles was beset by difficulties in manning his ship, the Edgar put to sea from the Nore manned by soldiers from 23 different regiments, and commanded by officers from still other regiments. Typhus and 'the itch' were rampant, on the ship's return to port she had to be scrubbed with lime water and fumigated with vinegar, while 100 men were discharged to the hospital. Knowles suffered a further mishap when the Edgar was dismasted in a storm off the Texel, and had to be towed back to the Nore.

Knowles transferred to the 74-gun HMS Goliath in late 1795, serving under Sir John Jervis at Lisbon. While serving there he ran foul of Jervis, who had him court-martialled in 1796 on a charge of disobeying a verbal order. At the trial Jervis's captain of the fleet Robert Calder swore that no order had been given, and the lieutenant who was supposed to have transmitted it swore he had not received one. The charge was therefore dismissed, but this appears to have been the start of a personal enmity of Jervis against Knowles. The extreme animosity between Jervis and Knowles may well have originated in a conversation in 1790 reputedly overheard by Jervis, listening at the keyhole, when Knowles was warning his friend, Admiral Barrington, of Jervis' duplicitous behaviour.

=== Battle of Cape St Vincent ===
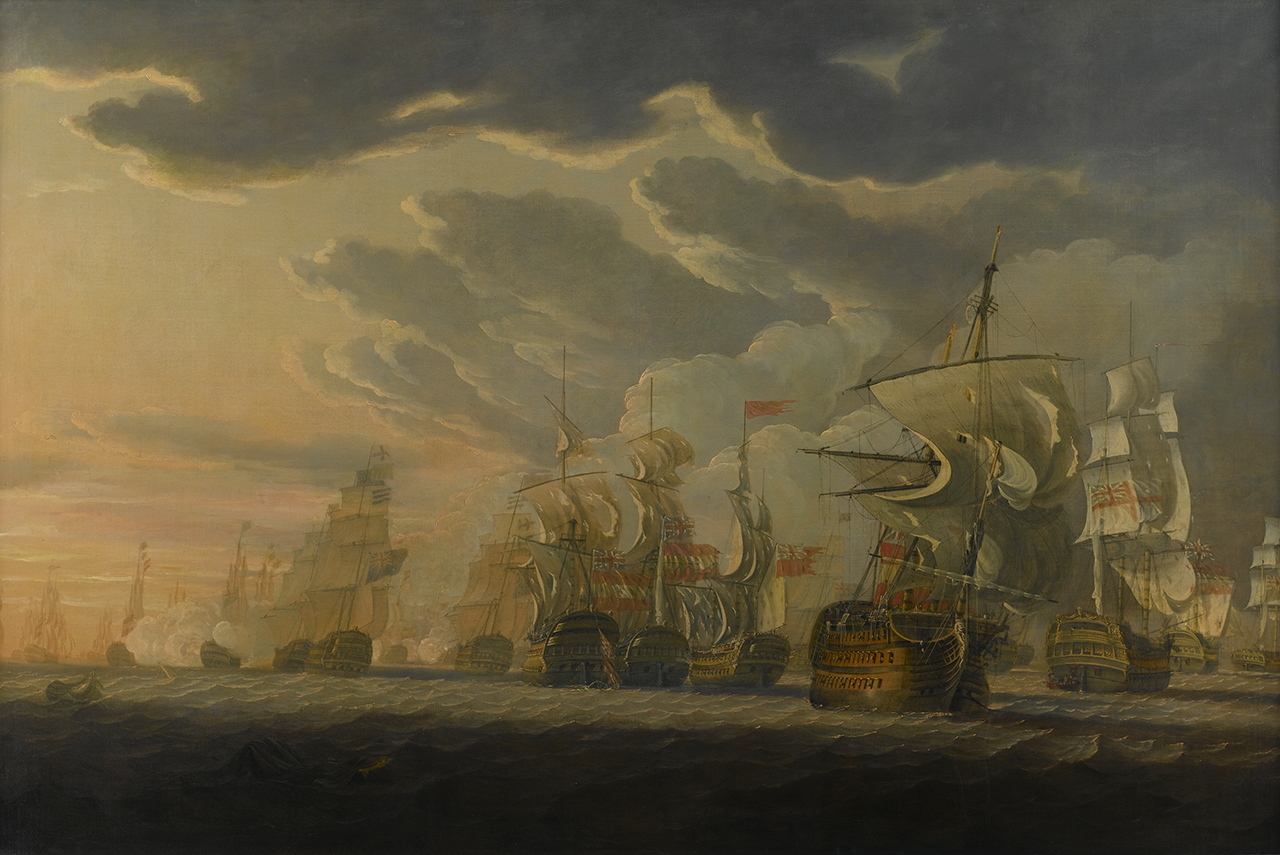
The Battle of Cape St Vincent, 14 February 1797 by Robert Cleveley. Knowles was criticised by Jervis for his actions during the engagement.

Knowles was still in Jervis's fleet in command of Goliath when the Battle of Cape St Vincent was fought on 14 February 1797. During the engagement Jervis ordered his ships to tack in succession whilst in close action with the enemy. Knowles did so, coming under heavy fire and was forced to temporarily drop out of the action while the Goliath' knotted and spliced their rigging. On his return to the battle, Knowles observed an opportunity to pass to windward of the Santísima Trinidad and so becalm her. Jervis however signalled Goliath and ordered Knowles to stop the manoeuvre. The following morning both Knowles on the Goliath, and James Whitshed on HMS Namur had observed the vulnerable situation that the Santísima Trinidad was in, and attempted to signal this to Jervis. They received no reply.

The fleet anchored in Lagos Bay the following day, with Knowles placing the Goliath where she could provide flanking cover for the line. On going aboard Jervis's flagship HMS Victory he was however told by Jervis that the Goliath was vulnerable where she lay. Knowles replied that the Spanish were hardly likely to attack given their condition. While Knowles was dining with Vice-Admiral William Waldegrave that evening, Jervis sent the Victory's master to move Goliath, a great insult to Knowles. Jervis also ordered him to swap ships with Thomas Foley and take over HMS Britannia. Knowles soon returned to England after this, citing poor health.

== Later life ==
Knowles attended the service of thanksgiving at St Paul's Cathedral on 19 December 1797 for the victories at St Vincent and Camperdown, receiving a Naval Gold Medal, and then largely retired from public life. He spent the rest of his life in study, producing seven books of professional studies and a new code of signals in 1798, based on his 1777 work and incorporating revisions he had made in 1780, 1787 and 1794. He was promoted to Rear-Admiral on 14 February 1799, two years to the day after the Battle of Cape St Vincent, a Vice-Admiral on 24 April 1804 and a full Admiral on 31 July 1810. He is credited with having made the earliest suggestion for naval aircraft, when he proposed that balloons be flown from shipboard to observe the French invasion forces at Brest in 1803, and in 1830 he published his largely autobiographical work Observations on Naval Tactics.

He had married Charlotte Johnstone on 10 September 1800, the couple eventually having three sons and four daughters. She was the daughter of Charles Johnstone of Ludlow, brother of Sir Richard Vanden-Bempde-Johnstone, 1st Baronet, of Hackness Hall. Their father Col John Johnstone was the second son of Sir William Johnstone, 2nd Baronet of Westerhall. His mother was Charlotte, Marchioness of Annandale. He was nominated a Knight Grand Cross of the Order of the Bath on 16 May 1820 at the accession of King George IV.

His posthumous reputation is suggested, not by his rocky relationship with Jarvis but, by the words of a simple sailor who served under him at the Battle of Cape St Vincent: “ Not a man on board but would have bled for Sir C. H. Knowles. He was as good a captain as I ever sailed with..” Admiral Charles Henry Knowles died on 28 November 1831 at the age of 77. He was succeeded as baronet by his son Francis Charles Knowles.

== See also ==
- Knowles Baronets

== Notes ==
Baronetage of Great Britain
Preceded by Charles Knowles	Baronet (of Lovell Hill); 1777–1831	Succeeded by Francis Knowles
