= Montreal River (Michigan) =

River in the United States of America

Coordinates: 47°23′33.13″N 87°50′27.67″W

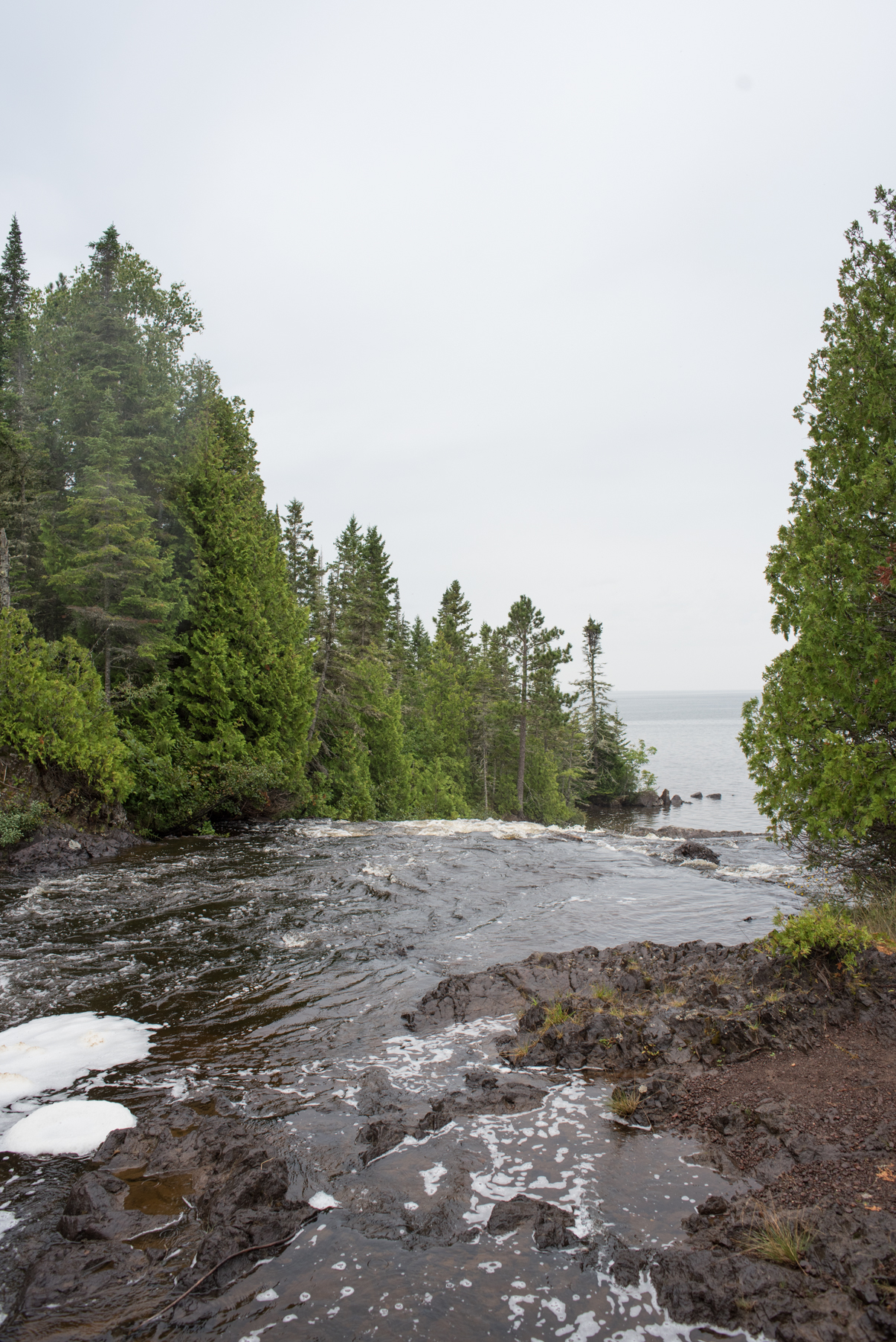
- The mouth of the Montreal River (Keweenaw) feeding into Lake Superior

Physical characteristics
- Mouth
  - location: Lake Superior
- Length: 26.9 mi (43.3 km)

The Montreal River is a 26.9-mile-long (43.3 km) river on the Keweenaw Peninsula of the U.S. state of Michigan. The Montreal River contains several rare plants and habitat, falls, and archeological sites; the lower portion of the Montreal River to Smith Fisheries is lowland conifer and contains steep slopes. There are three major waterfalls, and several smaller rapids.

In 2002, the state of Michigan purchased 6,275 acres (2,539 ha) in a two-phase acquisition. It includes over 6 miles (9.7 km) of shoreline, and covers the Montreal River from the mouth and up for several miles.

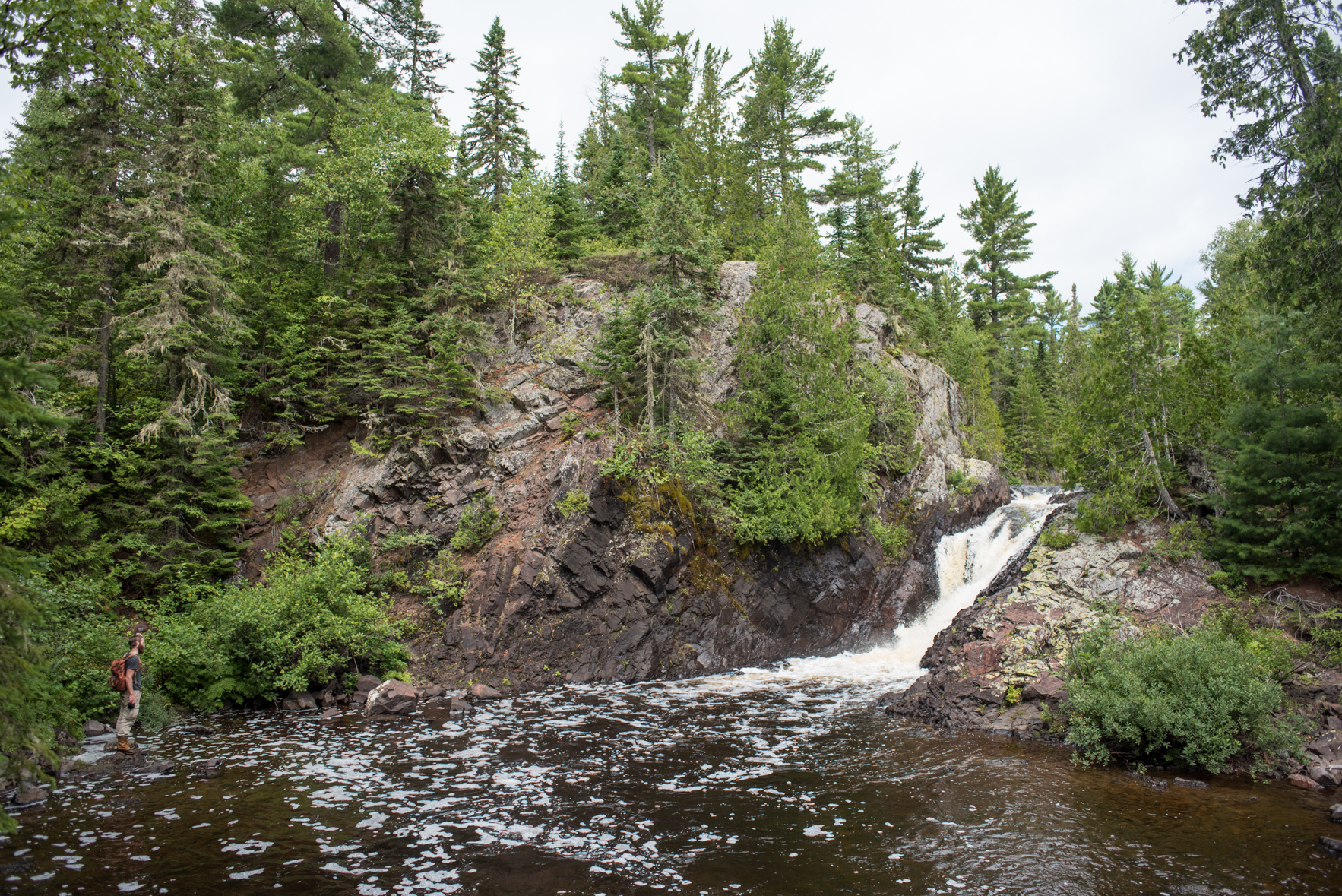
The Upper Falls of the Montreal River, showing the rugged shoreline and predominantly coniferous forest

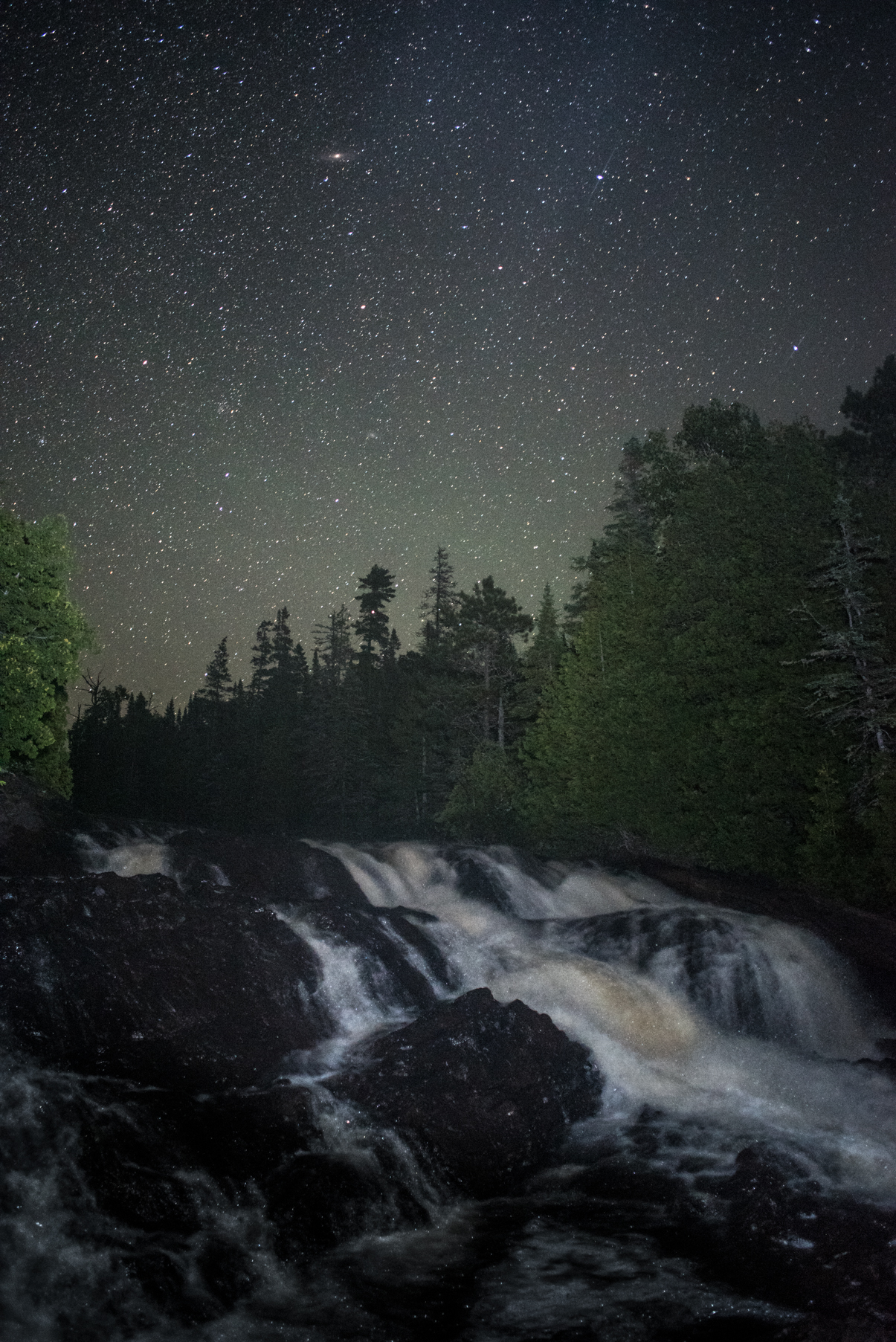
Lower Montreal Falls at night
