= Realmonte =

Comune di Realmonte Muntiriali (Sicilian)
- Comune
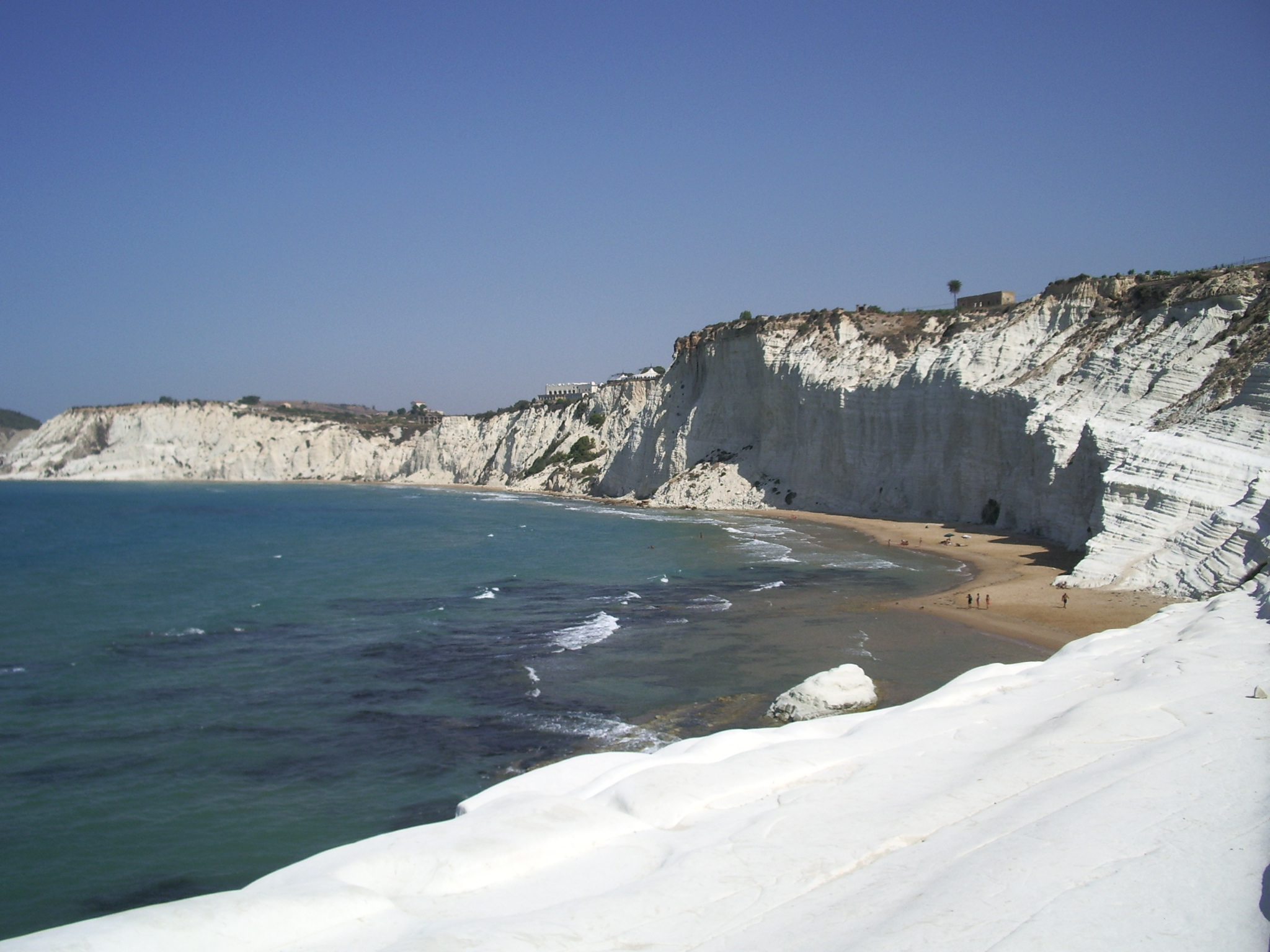
- Scala dei Turchi

- Location within Italy Location within Sicily
- Coordinates: 37°19′N 13°28′E
- Country: Italy
- Region: Sicily
- Province: Agrigento (AG)

Area
  - Total: 20.37 km^{2} (7.86 sq mi)
- Elevation: 144 m (472 ft)

Population (2018-01-01)
  - Total: 4,540
  - Density: 223/km^{2} (577/sq mi)
- Time zone: UTC+1 (CET)
  - Summer (DST): UTC+2 (CEST)
- Patron saint: Dominic
- Website: Official website

Realmonte (Sicilian: Muntiriali) is a municipality in the Province of Agrigento, Sicily, Italy. It is located 90 kilometres (56 mi) south of Palermo and about 10 kilometres (6 mi) west of Agrigento. Realmonte is adjacent to the municipalities of Agrigento, Porto Empedocle, and Siculiana. The population was 4,540 as of 2018.

Realmonte is a coastal town notable for the Scala dei Turchi and the ruins of an ancient Roman villa.

== History ==
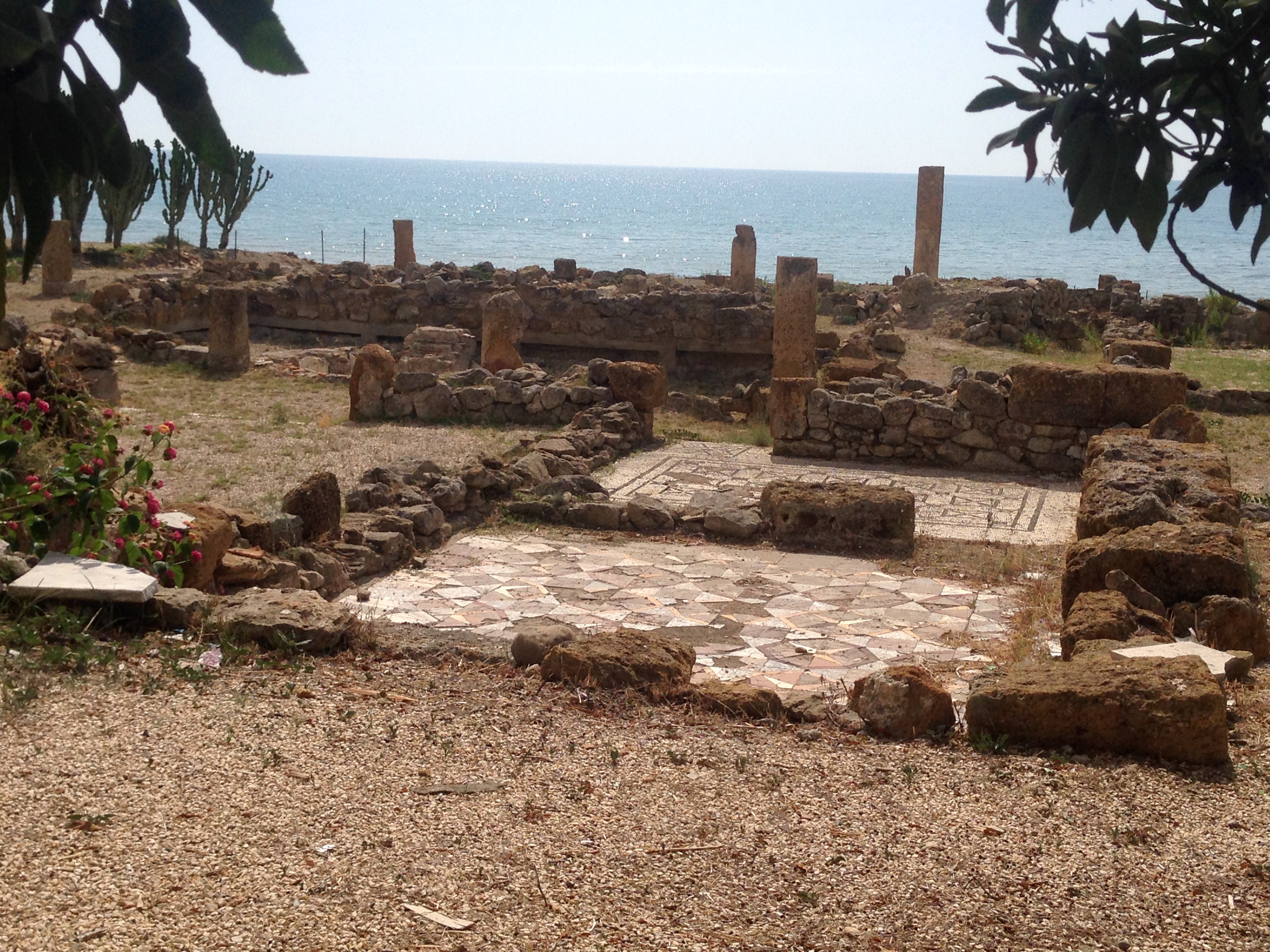
Roman villa of Realmonte

The large and elaborate Roman villa of Realmonte (also called Durrueli) is located on the coast. In Roman times this would have represented the seat of a large estate or latifundia. Excavations have recently revealed more of the extent and history of the site.

It is not known when the municipality was founded, but its origins probably go back to the second half of the 17th century.

=== Roman Villa ===
The Roman villa was first discovered in 1907 consisting of two rooms with elaborate opus sectile in expensive coloured marbles and three rooms with mosaic floors dating from the 1st c. AD.

Further excavations in 1979-1985 brought to light and adjacent wing of the villa with the thermal baths, probably built in a later period in 2nd c. AD. The villa included a peristyle around a garden which included the impluvium, a large basin for collecting rainwater.

Excavations resumed in 2017 and revealed that the villa extended to an area of 5000 m^{2} and was occupied until the 7th c. AD. It became a major industrial site producing tiles and pottery in the later period.

== Twin towns ==
- Hornaing, France, since 2011
- Perm, Russia, since 2011
- Eppelborn, Germany, since 2013
