= HMS Montreal (1761) =

Frigate of the Royal Navy

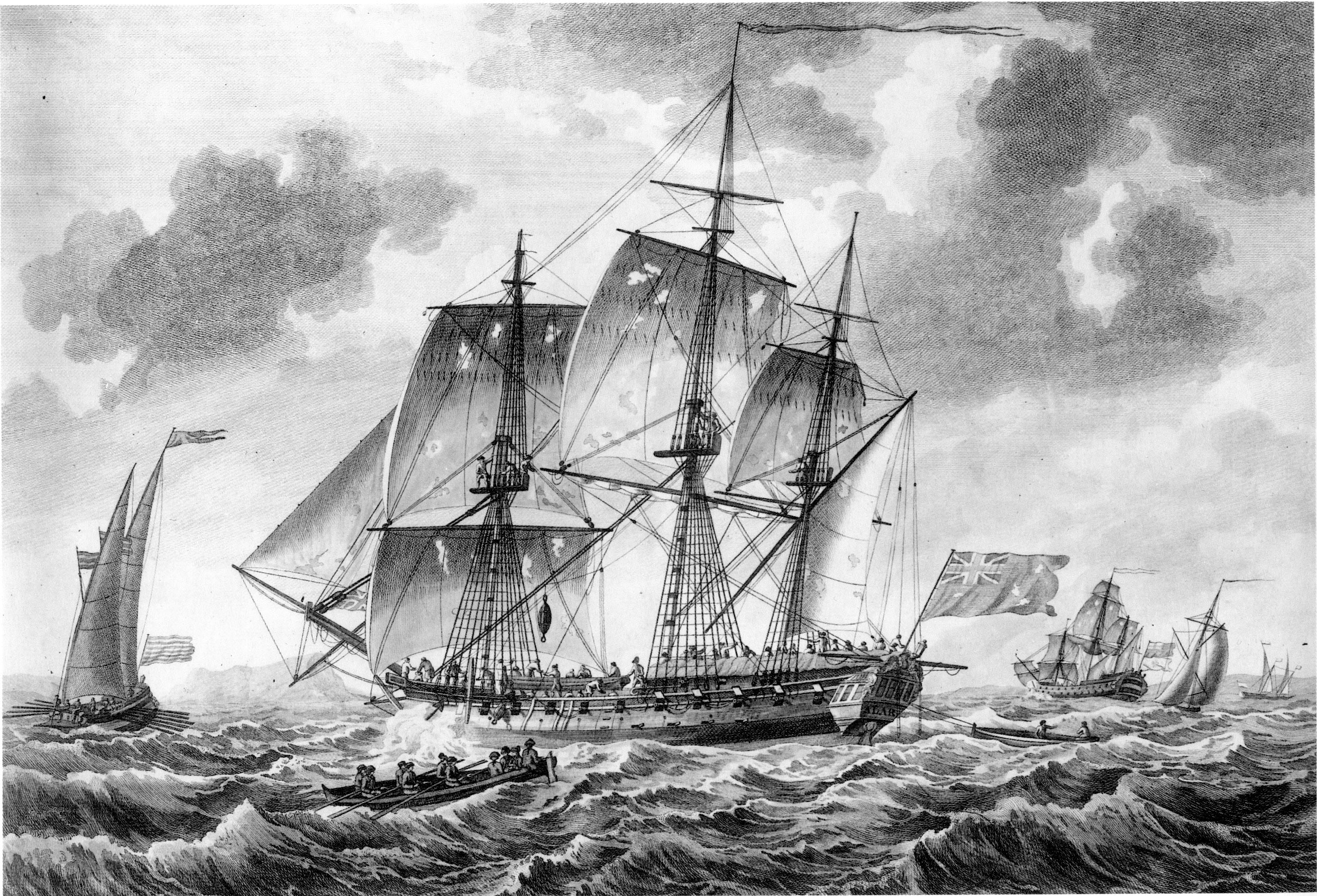
- HMS Alarm, a sister ship of HMS Montreal, in 1758

History

Great Britain
- Name: HMS Montreal
- Ordered: 6 June 1759
- Builder: Sheerness Dockyard
- Laid down: 26 April 1760
- Launched: 15 September 1761
- Completed: By 10 October 1761
- Captured: By the French on 1 May 1779

France
- Name: Montréal
- Acquired: 1 May 1779
- Fate: Destroyed on 18 December 1793

General characteristics
- Class & type: 32-gun Niger-class fifth-rate frigate
- Tons burthen: 681 71/94 (bm)
- Length: 125 ft 8 in (38.3 m) (overall); 103 ft 4 in (31.5 m) (keel)
- Beam: 35 ft 8 in (10.9 m)
- Depth of hold: 12 ft (3.7 m)
- Sail plan: Full-rigged ship
- Complement: 220
- Armament: Upperdeck: 26 × 12-pounder guns; QD: 4 × 6-pounder guns; Fc: 2 × 6-pounder guns; 12 × ½-pounder swivels

HMS Montreal was a 32-gun Niger-class fifth-rate frigate of the Royal Navy. She was launched in 1761 and served in the Seven Years' War and the American War of Independence. The French captured her in 1779 and she then served with them under the name Montréal. An Anglo-Spanish force destroyed her during the occupation of Toulon early in the French Revolutionary Wars.

== Construction and commissioning ==
Montreal was ordered from Sheerness Dockyard on 6 June 1759, one of an eleven ship class built to a design by Thomas Slade. She was laid down on 26 April 1760, launched on 15 September 1761, and was completed by 10 October 1761. She had been named Montreal on 28 October 1760, and was commissioned under her first commander, Captain William Howe, in September 1761, having cost £11,503.17.11d to build, including money spent fitting her out.

== British career ==
Montreal was first assigned to serve in the Mediterranean, which she sailed for in December 1761. She was paid off in July 1764 after the conclusion of the Seven Years' War. She was almost immediately recommissioned under Captain Keith Stewart, and returned to the Mediterranean in July that year. By 1766 Montreal was under the command of Captain Phillips Cosby, still in the Mediterranean, though she returned home in September 1767, bringing the body of the Duke of York, who had died in Monaco. She was paid off in early 1769 and returned to Portsmouth where she was examined as a model for future ship construction by the Kingdom of Sardinia. Master shipwright David Mearns prepared detailed sketches of the vessel, and these became the plans for the Sardinian frigate Carlo which was launched in 1770.

Montreal was recommissioned into the Royal Navy in December 1769 under Captain James Alms. She returned to the Mediterranean the following year, and was under the command of Captain Christopher Atkins from about September 1772. She paid off again in March 1773, and was surveyed at Chatham in April. A small to middling repair was carried out between July 1777 and February 1778, and she recommissioned in November 1777 under Captain Stair Douglas. She sailed to North America in April 1778, and was afterwards sent to the Mediterranean. While in North America Douglas was court-martialled for firing a gun into a small boat during some horseplay, killing a midshipman. He was acquitted on the grounds that he had not meant to kill. While in the Mediterranean Montreal formed part of Vice-Admiral Sir Robert Duff's squadron.

== Capture ==
On 4 May 1779 Montreal was sailing off Gibraltar in company with HMS Thetis when they encountered the French ships Bourgogne, under the command of Captain de Marin and Victoire, under command of Captain d'Albert Saint-Hippolyte, both ships of the 76th squadron out of Toulon. Thetis engaged Victoire and was able to escape, but Bourgogne captured Montreal. The French took her into service as Montréal.

British records largely agree, though they put the encounter on 1 May. When Thetis and Montreal saw two large ships approaching under Dutch colours, they suspected that the strange ships were French and attempted to sail away. Thetis succeeded, but at 9p.m., Bourgogne and Victoire caught up with Montreal, came alongside, and ordered Douglas to send over a boat. Captain Douglas sent over Lieutenant John Douglas, whom the French ordered to Douglas to hail Montreal and instruct her to strike. Captain Douglas refused and attempted to sail away, but after the French had fired several broadsides into Montreal he struck.

== French service ==
In July 1780, Montréal was escorting six ships destined for Algiers. She was under the command of Captain de Vialis de Fontbelle, who was also in charge of the convoy. At 5:30 in the morning, on 30 July 1780, de Vialis de Fontbelle noticed that four vessels to leeward had taken up pursuit of the convoy while the convoy was somewhere between the Tower of Cachique and Cape Caxine, about 12 miles from the Cape. At 6:00, it was determined that the four pursuing ships were enemy vessels, and that a fifth pursuer was coming up. At this time, de Vialis de Fontbelle signalled the convoy to make best speed to the Tower of Cachique. He sought refuge under its guns as it was under the control of a vassal of Algiers. The French identified the pursuing British squadron as consisting of two frigates, two brigs, and a xebec.

By 6:45, the two sides had begun exchanging long-range fire. The British ships were trying to cut inside the convoy, between shore and the convoy, and between the convoy and Montréal. By around 8:00, the two brigs had engaged the convoy. The 20-gun HMS Porcupine, under Captain Sir Charles Knowles, and xebec HMS Minorca, under Commander Hugh Lawson, engaged Montréal off the Barbary coast.

The convoy successfully anchored beneath the guns of Cachique. During the opening of close combat, de Vialis de Fontbelle had received two mortal wounds, one to the right arm and one to the left calf. He therefore turned over command to his second-in-command, the Count of LaPorte-Yssertieux, before dying. Montréal demasted one of the English vessels, which led the brigs to disengage to protect her. By 9:30, the English commander signaled withdrawal.

The two-hour engagement was inconclusive. Minorca suffered two men killed, while three men were killed and two wounded on Porcupine. The convoy suffered four dead, including Captain de Vialis de Fontbelle.

Later, three English ships gave chase when the convoy lifted anchor, however the convoy had lost them by 11:00, and reached Algiers intact. For his conduct in the action, la Porte-Yssertieux received a promotion to brevet de capitaine de vaisseau (Brevet Captain).

== Fate ==
The French later used Montréal as a powder hulk. The British captured her when they occupied Toulon in August 1793 in support of the monarchists there. The French Revolutionary forces besieged Toulon and on 16 December 1793 the British decided to evacuate the port while destroying as much as possible of the materials that they could not take away. Montréal was one of two powder hulks in the port, the other being the French frigate Iris. An Anglo-Spanish force was sent to scuttle them on the night of 18 December. Instead, the Spanish troops decided to set fire to the two powder hulks; the subsequent explosions destroyed both.
