= HMCS Royal Mount (K677) =

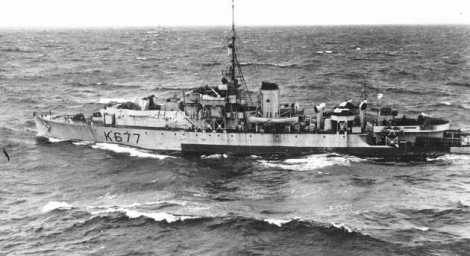
- HMCS Royal Mount

History

Canada
- Name: Royal Mount
- Namesake: Mount Royal, Quebec
- Builder: Canadian Vickers Ltd., Montreal
- Yard number: 179
- Laid down: 7 January 1944
- Launched: 15 April 1944
- Commissioned: 25 August 1944
- Decommissioned: 17 November 1945
- Identification: Pennant number: K677
- Honours and awards: Atlantic, 1944–45
- Fate: Sold for scrap 1946

General characteristics
- Class & type: River-class frigate
- Displacement: 1,445 long tons (1,468 t) standard
- Length: 283 ft 0 in (86.26 m) p/p; 301 ft 4 in (91.85 m) o/a
- Beam: 36 ft 7 in (11.15 m)
- Draught: 9 ft 0 in (2.74 m)
- Installed power: 2 × Admiralty 3-drum boilers; Reciprocating vertical triple expansion engine
- Propulsion: 2 shafts, 5,500 ihp (4,100 kW)
- Speed: 20 knots (37 km/h; 23 mph)
- Range: 7,200 nmi (13,300 km; 8,300 mi) at 12 kn (22 km/h; 14 mph)
- Complement: 145
- Sensors & processing systems: HF/DF; ASDIC; Type 147B Sword sonar
- Armament: 2 × QF 4 in (102 mm) guns; 4 × twin 20 mm cannon; 1 × Hedgehog anti-submarine mortar; up to 150 depth charges

HMCS Royal Mount was a River-class frigate that served with the Royal Canadian Navy during the Second World War. She was used primarily as an ocean convoy escort in the Battle of the Atlantic. She was named for Mount Royal, Quebec and was constructed in Montreal by Canadian Vickers. The ship was laid down on 7 January 1944, launched on 15 April and commissioned on 25 August. After the war ended, the ship was placed in reserve until 1947, when the ship was sold for scrap.

== Background and description ==
The River-class frigate design was an upgraded version of the Flower-class corvette, remedying many of the Flower class' issues as an ocean escort. The initial vessels were constructed for the Royal Navy and were named for rivers, however, in Canada, they were named for cities. Canada was informed of the design development in December 1940, but the plans were not delivered until late April 1941. The design was too large to fit through the canals on the St. Lawrence River, restricting the construction of the River-class ships to three shipyards, all with direct access to the sea. The first fifteen Canadian ships followed the standard British design.

The frigates measured 301 feet 4 inches (91.85 m) long overall and 283 ft 0 in (86.26 m) between perpendiculars with a beam of 36 ft 7 in (11.15 m) and a draught of 9 ft 0 in (2.74 m). They had a standard displacement of 1,445 long tons (1,468 t) and had increased flare and sheer forward to improve the vessel's dryness at sea. They were square amidships with deep bilge keels to alleviate rolling in heavy seas. They had a complement of 10 officers and 135 ratings.

The River class were powered by a steam created by two Admiralty three-drum boilers pumped to a vertical triple expansion engine turning two propeller shafts. The system creating 5,500 indicated horsepower (4,100 kW) giving the ships a maximum speed of 20 knots (37 km/h; 23 mph). The frigates carried 440 long tons (450 t) of oil fuel and they had a range of 7,200 nautical miles (13,300 km; 8,300 mi) at 12 knots (22 km/h; 14 mph).

The first 15 Canadian ships that followed the British design mounted a single 4-inch (102 mm) gun forward and one aft. The remaining Canadian ships mounted twin 4-inch guns forward and a single 12-pounder naval gun aft. The Canadian ships had eight 20 mm (0.79 in) cannon in four twin powered mounts for anti-aircraft defence. They also mounted four heavy machine guns. Two of the 20 mm mounts faced forward and two astern, with two located on the bridge wings and two at the break of the forecastle. For anti-submarine warfare (ASW) the ships carried a Hedgehog ASW mortar forward and the frigates initially carried 100 depth charges, later rising to 145, to be fired from four throwers and two stern tracks and rails. Two of the throwers were located on the port side of the ship, and the other two on the starboard side. 30 charges were kept for the rails and racks and 32 for the throwers. During the war, all of the early ships that mounted single 4-inch guns forward were refitted to carry the twin mount instead. Furthermore, the 12-pounder guns were replaced by twin 40 mm (1.6 in) cannon.

The River-class frigates were equipped with the Type 147B Sword sonar and ASDIC which were used in conjunction to find submarines below the surface. The combination of the two allowed for the frigates to maintain tracking targets even while firing. For tracking surfaced submarines, HFDF was installed. HFDF searched for the communication signals of opposing submarines, which had to surface to communicate.

== Service history ==
Ordered as part of the 1942–1943 River-class building programme, the ship was constructed by Canadian Vickers at their yard in Montreal, Quebec. The vessel was laid down on 7 January 1944 as Alvington and launched on 15 April. The ship was renamed Royal Mount and named for the town of Mount Royal, Quebec. The ship's name was reversed to prevent confusion with any ship named Montreal. The frigate was commissioned in the Royal Canadian Navy at Montreal on 25 August.

Royal Mount sailed for Halifax and worked up at Bermuda in September 1944. Upon her return to Halifax, she was assigned to the Mid-Ocean Escort Force (MOEF) escort group C-1 as a trans-Atlantic convoy escort, joining up with the group in November. She remained with MOEF until May 1945, when she returned to Canada for the final time. Royal Mount underwent a refit from 26 May to 5 October 1945 at Sydney, Nova Scotia. For service during the Second World War, Royal Mount was awarded the battle honour "Atlantic 1944–45".

The frigate was decommissioned on 17 November and placed in reserve in Bedford Basin. Royal Mount remained there until her purchase in 1947 for scrap. The ship was broken up at New York City with work completed in 1948. The ship's bell lies in the entrance to the town hall of Mount Royal. The ship was commemorated during the Canadian Naval Centennial.
