= 2019 Quebec, Ontario and New Brunswick floods =

Flood in Canada

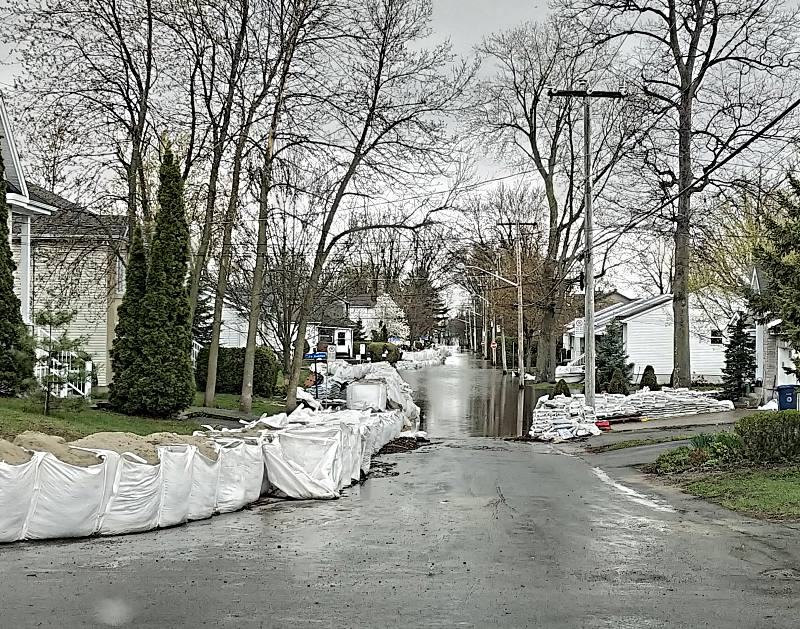
- Flooded street and Dyke in Laval-Ouest, 14 May 2019
- Date: 1 to 3 Months depending on location
- Location: Quebec, Ontario and New Brunswick, Canada
- Deaths: 1

The 2019 spring floods in Ontario, Quebec and New Brunswick were exceptional floods in eastern Ontario, southern Quebec and from the St.John River region to New Brunswick, Canada. In fact, flooding along the Ottawa River has been recognized as the most important weather event of the year 2019 in Canada, and the one along the Saint John River as the ninth, by Environment and Climate Change Canada. The flooding caused by the rapid spring snow melt, coupled with frozen ground, and several heavy rain events that resulted in abnormally high cumulative rainfall for April and May.

In Quebec, 6681 residences of 51 municipalities were flooded in five main zones, including the greater Montreal area, and 3458 residences were isolated due to landslides and submerged roads resulting in over 13500 disaster victims.

In New Brunswick, 15 communities were affected and 69 roads and 45 bridges were closed or partially closed.

With the experience gained during the 2017 Quebec floods, the Canadian Armed Forces were called early on to support local authorities and volunteers in the regions as soon as the rivers showed signs of potential flooding and weather forecasts showed a heightened risk. More than 2200 Canadian soldiers were deployed in the three provinces to assist residents.

== Meteorological conditions ==
During the spring thaw, runoff from snow melt flows into rivers, causing localized overflows each year in many parts of the three provinces. The winter of 2018-2019 was particularly cold and snowy, the thick snowpack remained for an extended period into may while temperatures remained colder than average.

In addition, late snowfall and "freezing rain" affected the area in early April, leaving more than 20 cm of snow everywhere and up to 20mm of ice on the Ottawa River and Montreal

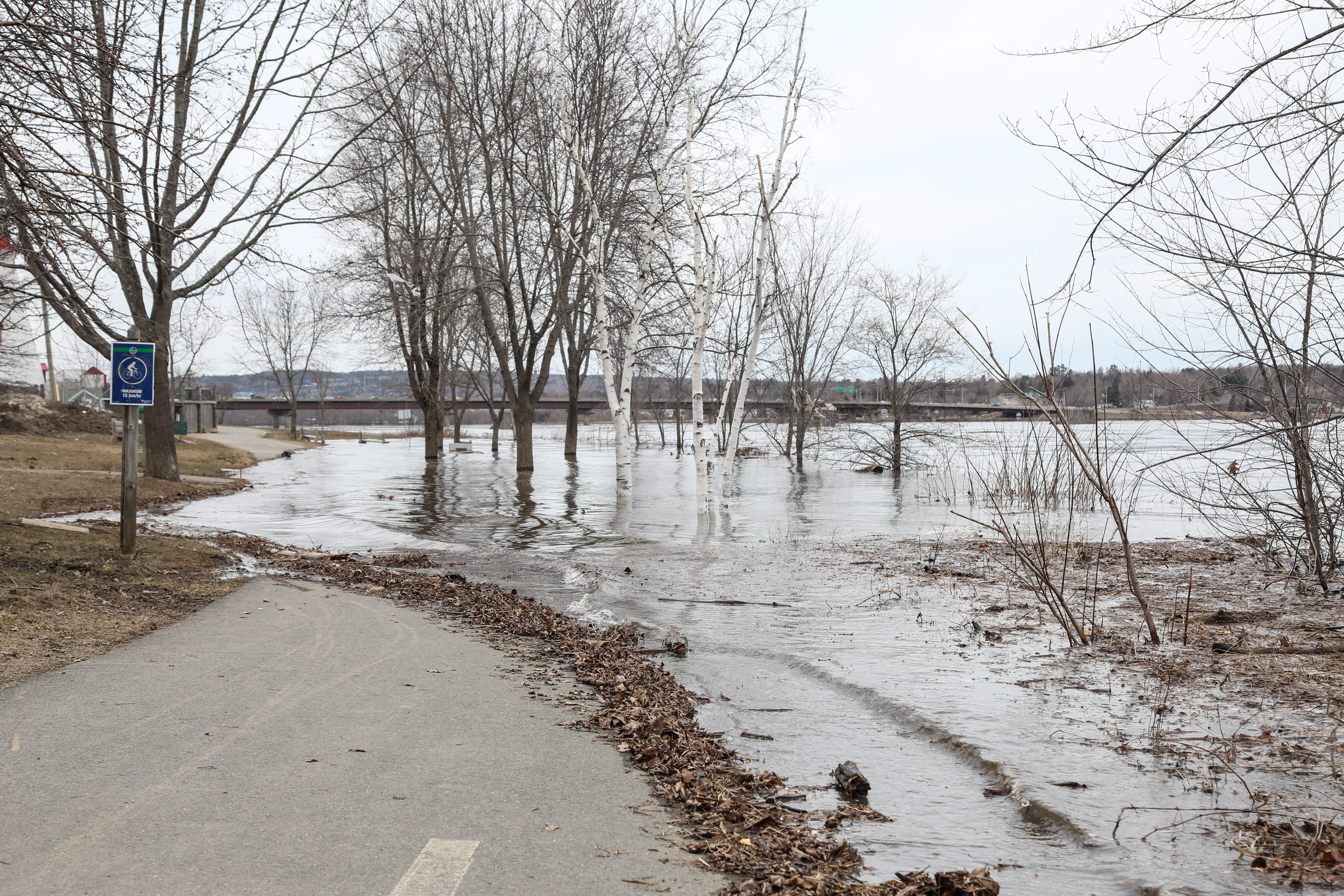
Flooded street in New Brunswick

In the second half of the month, several depressions left significant accumulations of rain and then temperatures began to rise abruptly. This has had the effect of accelerating snowmelt and surface runoff. On April 28, many rivers reached and exceeded the flood threshold that was seen in the previous flood in 2017.

After a lull in the first 8 days of May, which reduced river levels, a large meteorological depression deposited 30mm to 50mm of within 3 days. Most of the reservoirs in the Abitibi-Témiscamingue region were already nearing capacity, and could not hold anymore surplus and the excess water flowed into the Ottawa River and the St.Lawrence River between Mattawa and Gatineau, water levels were expected to rise in the following days to record values

Over the following month, the levels in streams began to decline as less precipitation fell and the remaining snow cover was almost all melted away in northern areas and nonexistent in the south. The floods gradually subsided: first in New Brunswick, then in Ontario and Quebec. By the end of June, almost all areas were no longer flooded.

== Operation LENTUS ==
When the government of Quebec and New Brunswick requested the deployment of the Canadian Armed Forces, approximately 1000 soldiers were first assigned to this task.

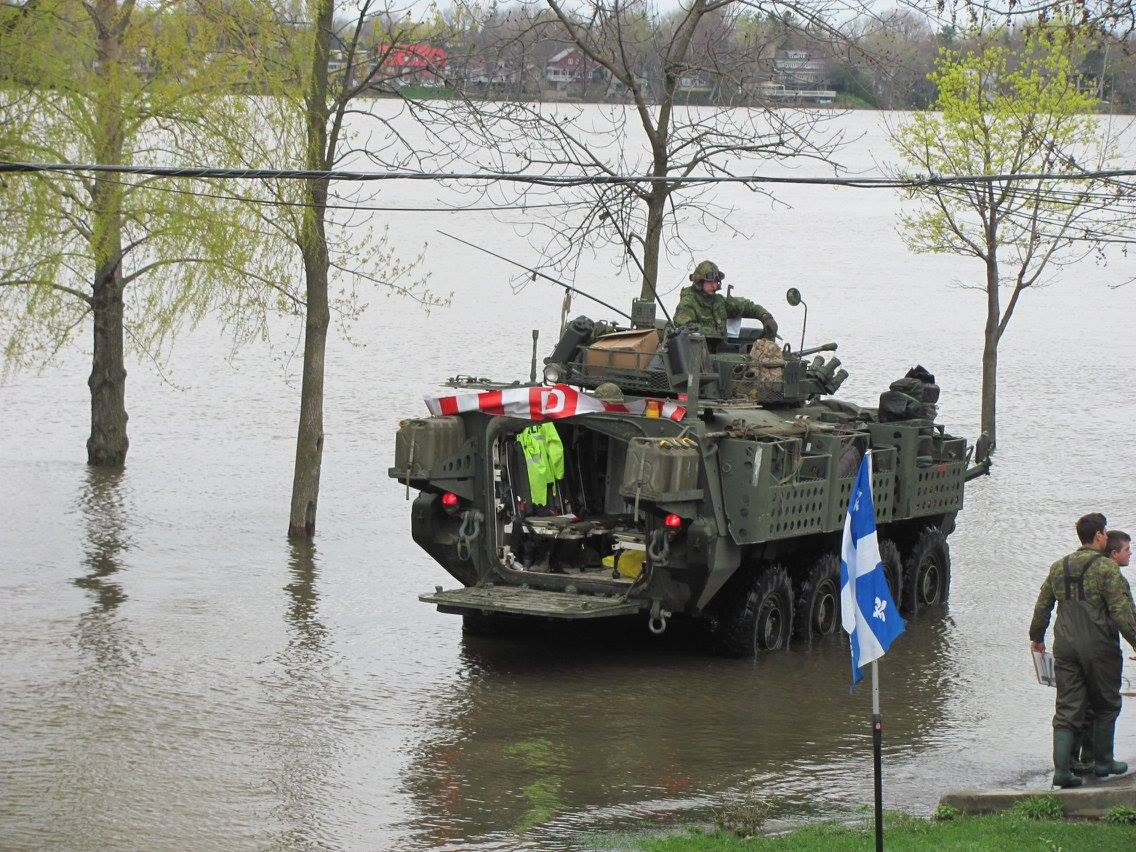
Canadian soldiers from operation LENTUS deployed on a flooded street in Laval, Quebec.

The number of deployed quickly rose to more than 2200 after additional assistance in Ontario as well as the added rainfall in late April that continued to raise water levels. The mission, known as Operation LENTUS , included more military personnel deployed to flood-affected areas in Ontario, Quebec, and New Brunswick, than there were on all previous missions in Canada.

As of May 3, approximately 1000 personnel from the Joint Task Force Central (JTFC) of the Canadian Joint Operations Command were present at Ottawa, Constance Bay, Wilola, Clarence-Rockland, Cumberland and Grand View in Ontario. In Quebec, the number of deployed was 1050 from Joint Task Force East (JTFE) and deployed throughout the province. Among them, nearly 400 Reservists and Seamen from HMCS Donnacona, HMCS Jolliet, HMCS Montcalm, HMCS Iberville, HMCS Radisson and HMCS Champlain. The 438th Tactical Helicopter Squadron provided air support. At the same time in New Brunswick, nearly 200 soldiers from Joint Task Force Atlantic (JTFA) were taking part in the operation and the 403rd Helicopter Operational Training Squadron was providing air support .

The main tasks of the CAF were:

- fill and move sandbags;
- lend a hand to the most vulnerable citizens;
- ensure the well-being of residents in the affected areas;
- help evacuate people from flooded areas;
- support efforts to protect property from flooding.

The Canadian Armed Forces officially ended the operation on June 6.
