= Canadian Navy Reserve =

Canadian Navy Reserve may refer to:

- Royal Naval Canadian Volunteer Reserve (RNCVR; 1914-1923)
- Royal Canadian Naval Volunteer Reserve (RCNVR; 1923-1945)
- Canadian Naval Reserve (1945-1968), see Canadian Forces Naval Reserve
- Canadian Forces Naval Reserve (1968-2012)
- Royal Canadian Navy Primary Reserve (2012-onwards), see Canadian Forces Naval Reserve
