= HMCS Queen Charlotte =

- Active: 1923 to present
- Country: Canada
- Branch: Royal Canadian Navy
- Type: Naval Reserve Division
- Role: Reserve unit
- Garrison/HQ: 210 Water Street; Charlottetown, Prince Edward Island; C1A 9M5
- Motto: None
- Colours: Red and Black
- Equipment: Various types of inboard and outboard rigid-hull inflatable boats
- Battle honours: None

HMCS Queen Charlotte is a Canadian Forces Naval Reserve Division (NRD) located in Charlottetown, Prince Edward Island. Dubbed a stone frigate, HMCS Queen Charlotte is a land-based naval training establishment crewed by part-time sailors and also serves as a local recruitment centre for the Royal Canadian Navy (RCN). It is one of 24 naval reserve divisions located in major cities across Canada.

== Namesake ==
The current day naval reserve unit is named after HMS Queen Charlotte, a ship-rigged sloop constructed for the Upper Canada Provincial Marine in 1810 at Amherstburg, Ontario, for service on Lake Erie.

== History ==
Established as the Charlottetown Half-Company of the Royal Naval Canadian Volunteer Reserve (RNCVR), by September 1923 the required minimum of 30 volunteers had been enrolled and Lieutenant George Buntain became the first Commanding Officer of Queen Charlotte. In the beginning, the unit occupied meagre accommodations housed alongside local militia (army) units. However, as recruiting and training needs increased, a new location was approved and Queen Charlotte moved to the Navy League building located on Haviland Street in Charlottetown. The unit moved once again to the Simms Building on the corner of Kent and Hillsborough Streets in Charlottetown in 1936 and on November 1, 1941, the unit was commissioned as a division.

During the Second World War, Queen Charlotte not only served as training location for local recruits and was also responsible for housing and training recruits from other naval divisions across the country. After the Second World War, Queen Charlotte became a demobilization centre. Eventually, with the reorganization of the navy into the newly formed RCN, Queen Charlotte was reverted to her original status as a reserve division. A new building was constructed for the division in 1959 (the present day Queen Charlotte Armoury) but five years later, on December 15, 1964, Queen Charlotte was paid off and the facilities were turned over to the Canadian Militia.

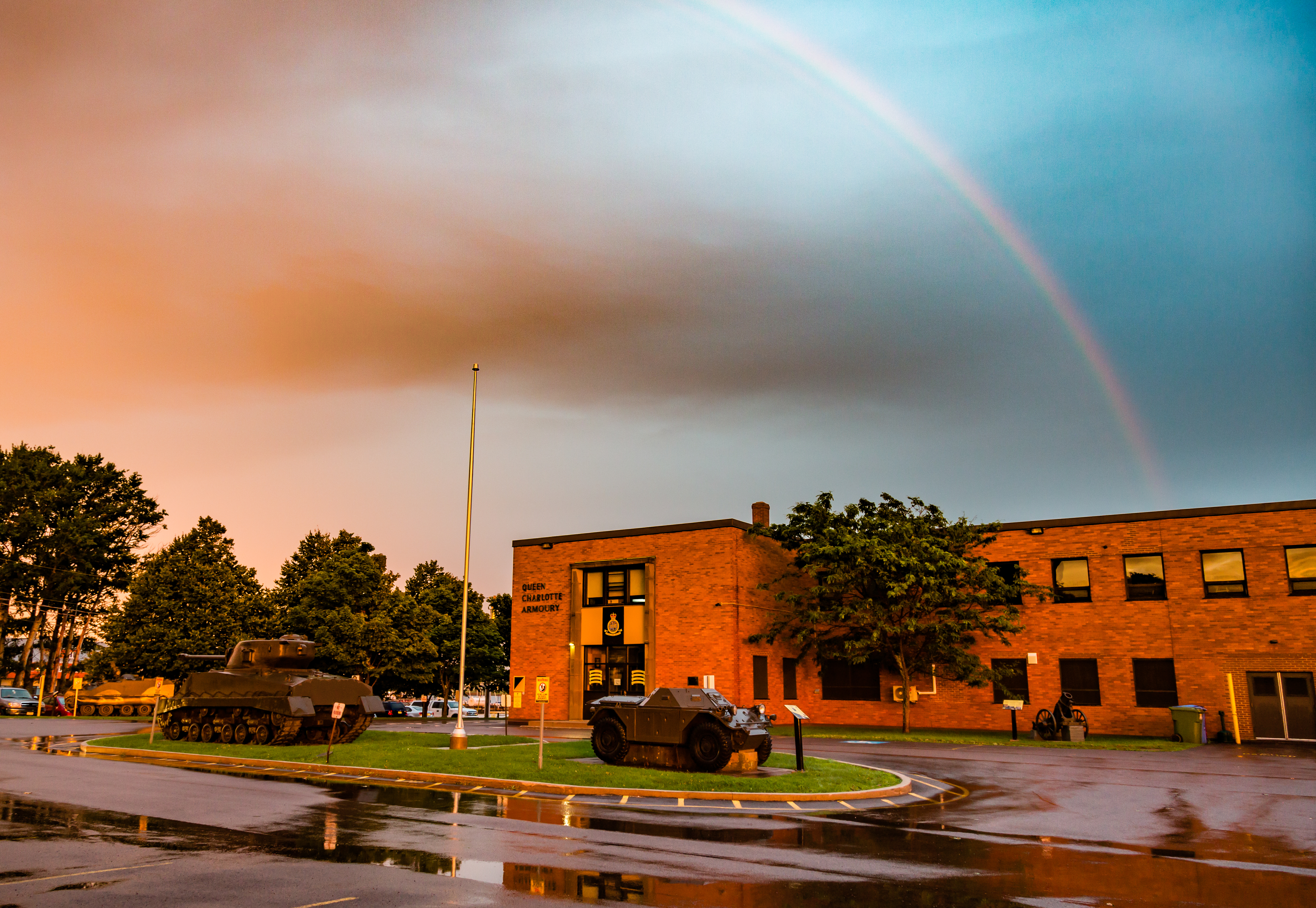
Queen Charlotte Armoury, now home to the Museum of the Prince Edward Island Regiment.

In the early 1990s, the Department of National Defence looked to revitalize the Canadian Navy and in 1993 the Minister of National Defence announced plans to re-establish HMCS Queen Charlotte as a Canadian Forces Naval Reserve Division. The unit began training in June of 1994 and was re-commissioned on September 17, 1994. Initially housed at rented facility in the West Royalty Industrial Park, two years later, in September 1996, the ground breaking ceremony took place for a permanent facility and one year later Queen Charlotte shifted ship on September 23, 1997.

Today, Queen Charlotte trains sailors and teams for Canadian Armed Forces (CAF) domestic and international operations, while at the same time supporting the Navy's efforts in connecting with Canadians through the maintenance of a broad national presence. Reservists employed at Queen Charlotte are individuals who are otherwise engaged in full-time civilian careers while pursuing a part-time military career as an officer or non-commissioned member. They train and work for the Navy in the evenings, on weekends and during the summer period. Most serve on a part-time basis, with no obligation to participate in any mission overseas. However, many full-time employment opportunities and deployments are available to those Reservists who volunteer for them.
