= HMCS Queen =

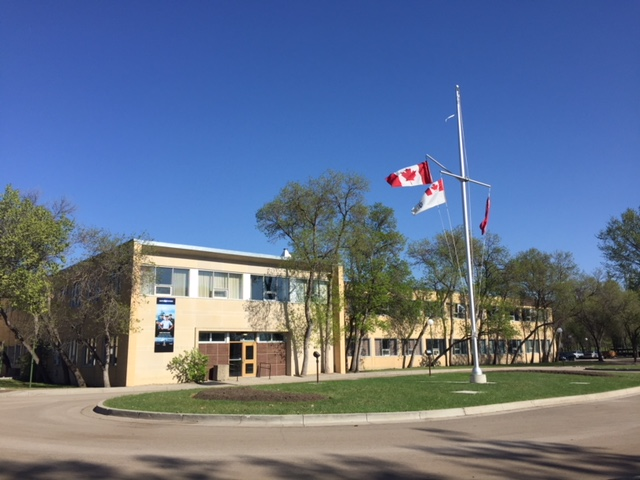
- Active: 1923 to Present
- Country: Canada
- Branch: Royal Canadian Navy
- Type: Naval Reserve Division
- Role: Reserve unit
- Garrison/HQ: Navy Way, 100, Regina
- Mottos: Augusta Invictaque (Majestic and invincible)
- Colours: Gold and Purple
- Equipment: 24 ft (7.3 m) RHIB (ZH-733 CDO)
- Battle honours: Pre-The First World War: USHANT, 1781; "First of June", 1794; GROIX ISLAND, 1795; CRIMEA, 1854-55; The First World War: DARDANELLES, 1915; The Second World War: ATLANTIC, 1944; NORWAY, 1945; ARCTIC, 1945

HMCS Queen is a shore based Canadian Forces Naval Reserve unit based at 100 Navy Way in Regina, Saskatchewan. It is one of two in Saskatchewan, the other being HMCS Unicorn in Saskatoon, Saskatchewan. The name is the translation of the Latin word regina.

HMCS Queen was established in 1923. After several locations within the city, HMCS Queen moved into a permanent home in Wascana Park in 1955. Closed in 1964 due to budget cuts, it re-opened in 1975. The battle honours of all HM Ships Queen have been inherited by HMCS Queen.

LCdr Aaron Kaytor assumed command of HMCS Queen in 2022, replacing Cdr Clark Northey.
