= HMCS Hunter =

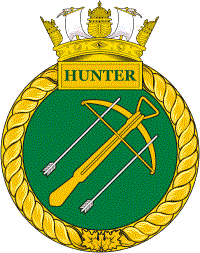
- HMCS Hunter Badge
- Active: 1941 to present
- Country: Canada
- Branch: Royal Canadian Navy
- Type: Naval Reserve Division
- Role: Reserve unit
- Garrison/HQ: Windsor, Ontario
- Motto: Ready When Required
- Colours: Hunter Green and Gold
- Anniversaries: Battle of the Atlantic
- Equipment: Various types of inboard and outboard rigid-hull inflatable boats
- Battle honours: Pre-The First World War: Gabbard, 1653; Scheveningen, 1653; Barfleur, 1692; Vigo, 1702; Velezmalaga, 1704; Louisburg, 1758; Quebec, 1759; The Second World War: Atlantic 1939–44; Narvik, 1940; Salerno, 1943; South France, 1944; Aegean, 1944; Burma, 1945

Commanders
- Current commander: LCdr C. Elliott

HMCS Hunter is a Canadian Forces Naval Reserve Division (NRD) located in Windsor, Ontario. Dubbed a stone frigate, HMCS Hunter is a land-based naval training establishment crewed by part-time sailors and also serves as a local recruitment centre for the Canadian Forces Naval Reserve. It is one of 24 naval reserve divisions located in major cities across Canada.

== Namesake ==
HMCS Hunter is named after HMS General Hunter, a 10-gun brig of the Upper Canada Provincial Marine Royal Navy Lake Erie squadron. The original battle scarred ensign flown on HMS General Hunter during the War of 1812, at the Siege of Detroit and the Battle of Lake Erie, is currently in possession by the unit.

== History ==
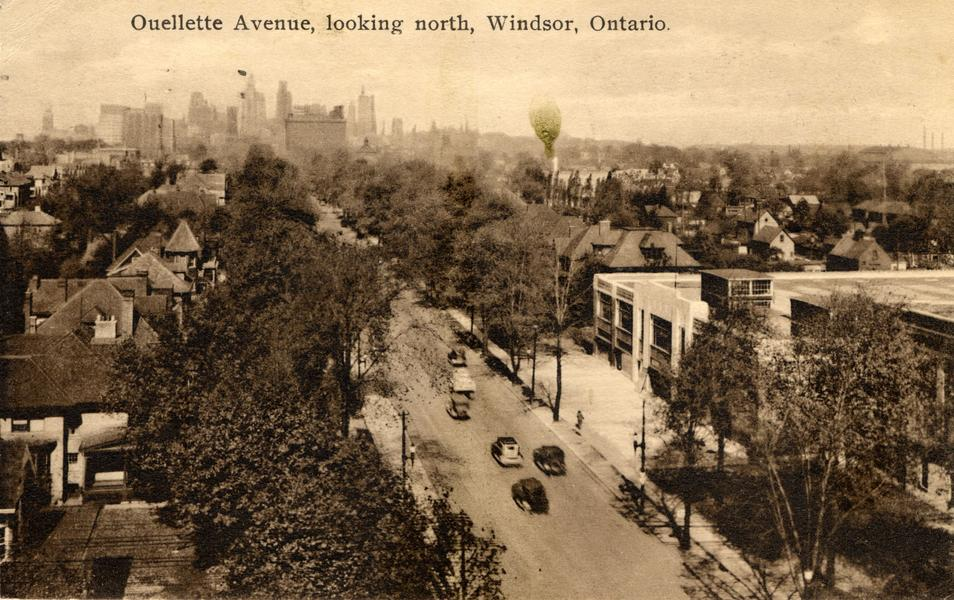
Aerial view of Ouellette Avenue looking north from Erie Street; on the north side of it is the original HMCS Hunter building.

HMCS Hunter was established in March 1940 as the Windsor Half Company Royal Canadian Naval Volunteer Reserve (RCNVR) at the old Toledo Scales plant at 2462 Howard Ave. in Windsor, Ontario.

She was formally commissioned as a tender to HMCS Stadacona (Halifax) on 1 November 1941 during the Second World War. On 1 September 1942, she became an independent shore establishment. Her first commanding officer was Lt. Jordon H. Marshall, RCNVR.

The original HMCS Hunter building was built in 1929 by Fred W. Martin, the same man who built the Detroit-Windsor Tunnel, and located at 960 Ouellette Avenue in Windsor. Planned as a giant food market, the building was designed by president of the Toronto Building Company, R. J. Davies. The unit originally housed and trained new sailors preparing to join Canadian naval ships during the Second World War.

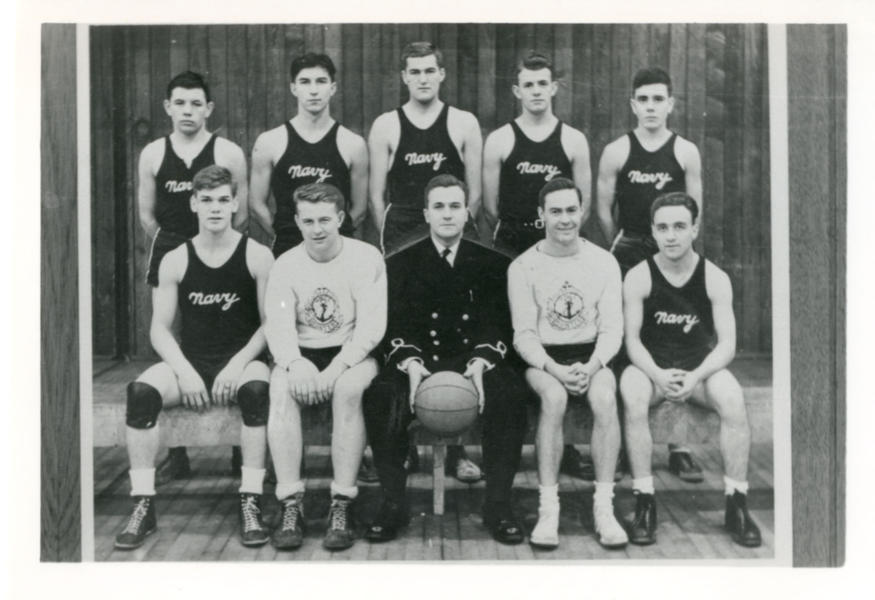
HMCS Hunter Naval Reserve Basketball Team (Windsor) c. 1945

After the Second World War, HMCS Hunter was reorganised into a peacetime footing, no longer required to train and ship new recruits off to war. During the post-war period, HMCS Hunter personnel actively participated in the city intermediate basketball league, playing other city teams, including teams from the 22nd Reconnaissance Regiment and the Essex Scottish Regiment. Basketball was a very popular sport amongst sailors at HMCS Hunter, with games being played on Friday sport nights. The unit also entered a team in the Border Cities Baseball League.

In 1949, the officers organised a Naval Officers' Revolver Club, which later joined the Dominion of Canada Rifle Association. A sterling silver spoon bearing the Navy crest was awarded to the top marksman at each shoot. In the same year, new gear was installed for the power operation of twin Oerlikon and twin Boffin gun batteries and the unit possessed a whaler to train personnel on land. In 1949, HMCS Hunter had two dinghies, a harbour craft and a motor cutter in service on the Detroit River.

In 1946 the University Naval Training Division (UNTD) was established at Assumption College with sailors reporting to Hunter for training. Not eligible for commission or service prior to completing university, UNTD student/sailors would conduct 60 hours of training during the school year two weeks on the coast each summer.

In June 1950, the unit sent 35 men and its Fairmile-B class motor launch, PTC 762, to partake in Exercise "Beaver", a tri-service reserve beach assault manoeuvre at Port Stanley, Ontario. The exercise involved land units, including the Elgin Regiment, Kent Regiment, Essex Fusiliers and the Windsor Essex Scottish Regiment; sea units, PTC 779 from HMCS Prevost, PTC 762 from HMCS Hunter and PTC 706 from HMCS Star; and 11 aircraft from the City of London Auxiliary Squadron, RCAF.

In 1951, a new reserve summer Great Lakes Training Scheme was set up to provide basic naval training on the Great Lakes for new recruits and officers. Administered by the commanding officer of HMCS Prevost, Commander F.R.K. Naften, the program was conceived to provide seagoing experience for men of the RCN(R) who have not completed the six-month new entry training program. Before being sent to ships and fleet establishments, until they were considered sufficiently trained, the new scheme was intended to give new sailors the experience they needed on the Great Lakes. With six motor launches at his disposal, the new Reserve Training Commander Great Lakes called upon PTCs from HMCS Hunter, York, Cataraqui, Prevost, Star and Griffin to form the "Fairmile Flotilla". From 16 to 17 June, the flotilla conducted its first task, "Operation Beaver II", a 1,700 reserve troop tri-service amphibious landing and airdrop exercise at Erieau. Prior to the amphibious landing of nearly 500 army troops on three beaches from the Fairmiles, PTC 716 from HMCS York laid a smokescreen and paratroopers from the 1st Battalion, Royal Canadian Regiment captured an airfield at nearby Chatham to allow friendly air support. Buzzing the "enemy" craft and ground troops with flour bags, a squadron of Harvard and Mustang aircraft, from No. 420 City of London Auxiliary Squadron, RCAF took on the role of enemy air forces. After the successful exercise, the flotilla spent the rest of the summer conducting other sailing activities and evolutions on Lake Ontario, Lake Huron, and Lake Superior before returning to their units.

In the fall of 1951, HMCS Hunter stood up a Women's Royal Canadian Naval Service (WRCNS) division that proved themselves adept on the rifle range on a number of occasions and in 1952 showed up their male counterparts by capturing the divisional proficiency shield. The trophy, awarded every two months, was presented to the division that scored the highest number of points for attendance, smartness and drill.

On 3 May 2015, the unit moved into a multi-million dollar state of the art facility to house the current members and equipment of the unit near Russell Street in Olde Sandwich Town, Windsor. The current building is located not far north of Amherstburg Navy Yard National Historic Site of Canada where the units namesake HMS General Hunter was constructed in 1806.

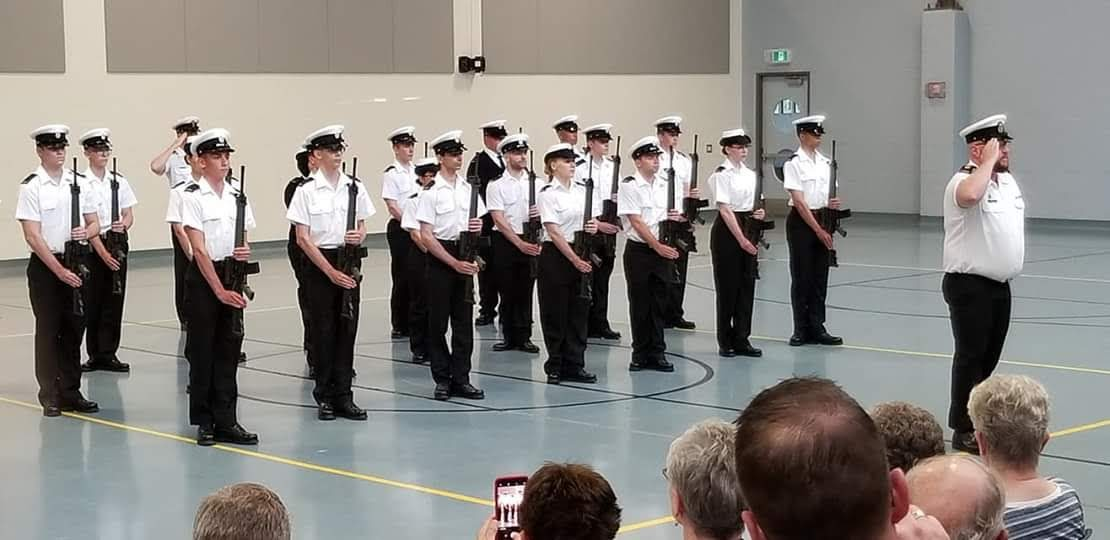
COOP students during their graduation ceremony attended by family and friends. (July 2018)

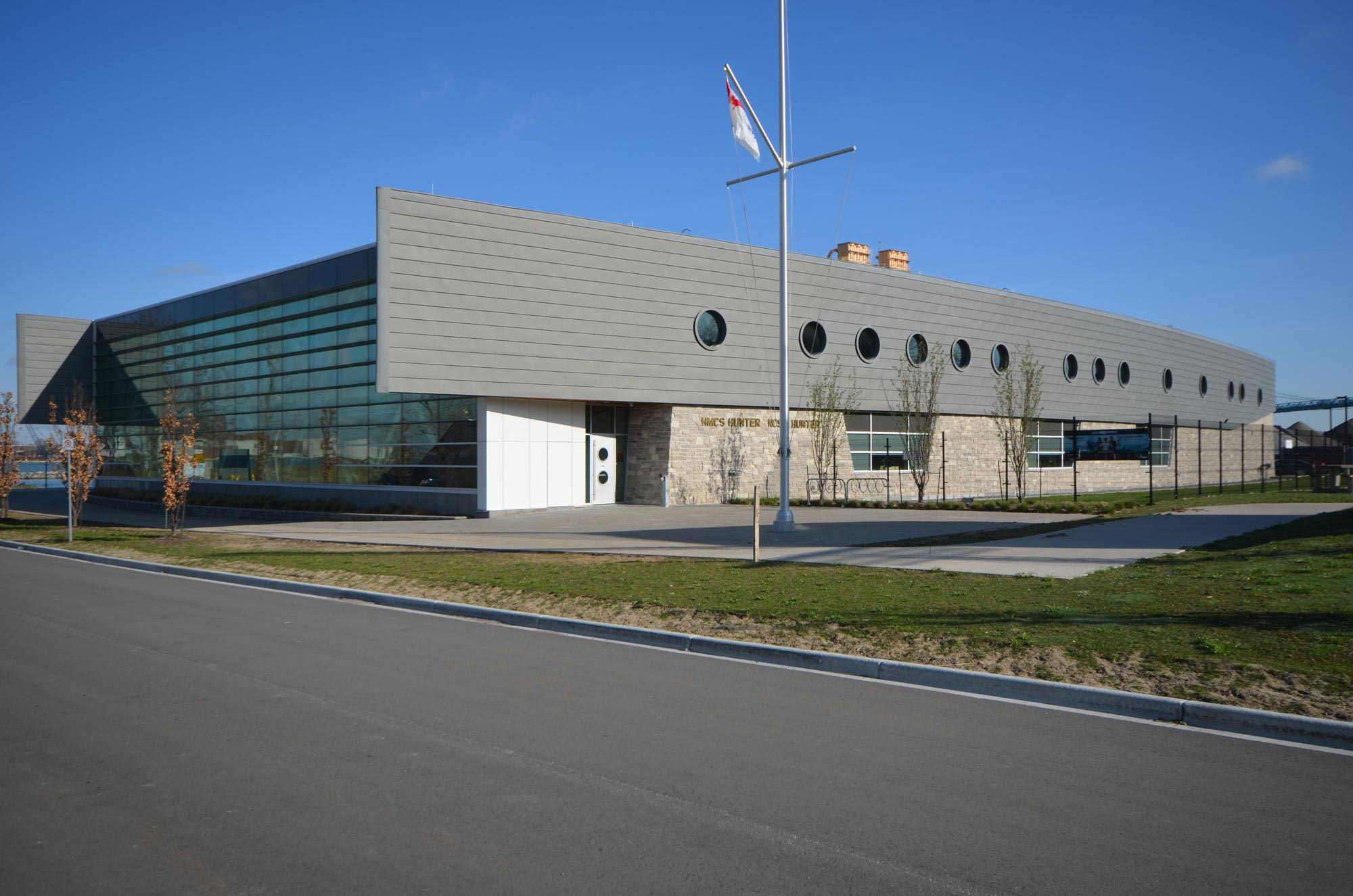
HMCS Hunter in 2018

In January 2018 the unit recruited 19 paid COOP students in a unique program with Greater Essex County District School Board, Windsor-Essex Catholic District School Board and Conseil scolaire catholique Providence (CSC Providence). In July 2018 the recruits were sent to Camp Vimy in CFB Valcartier.

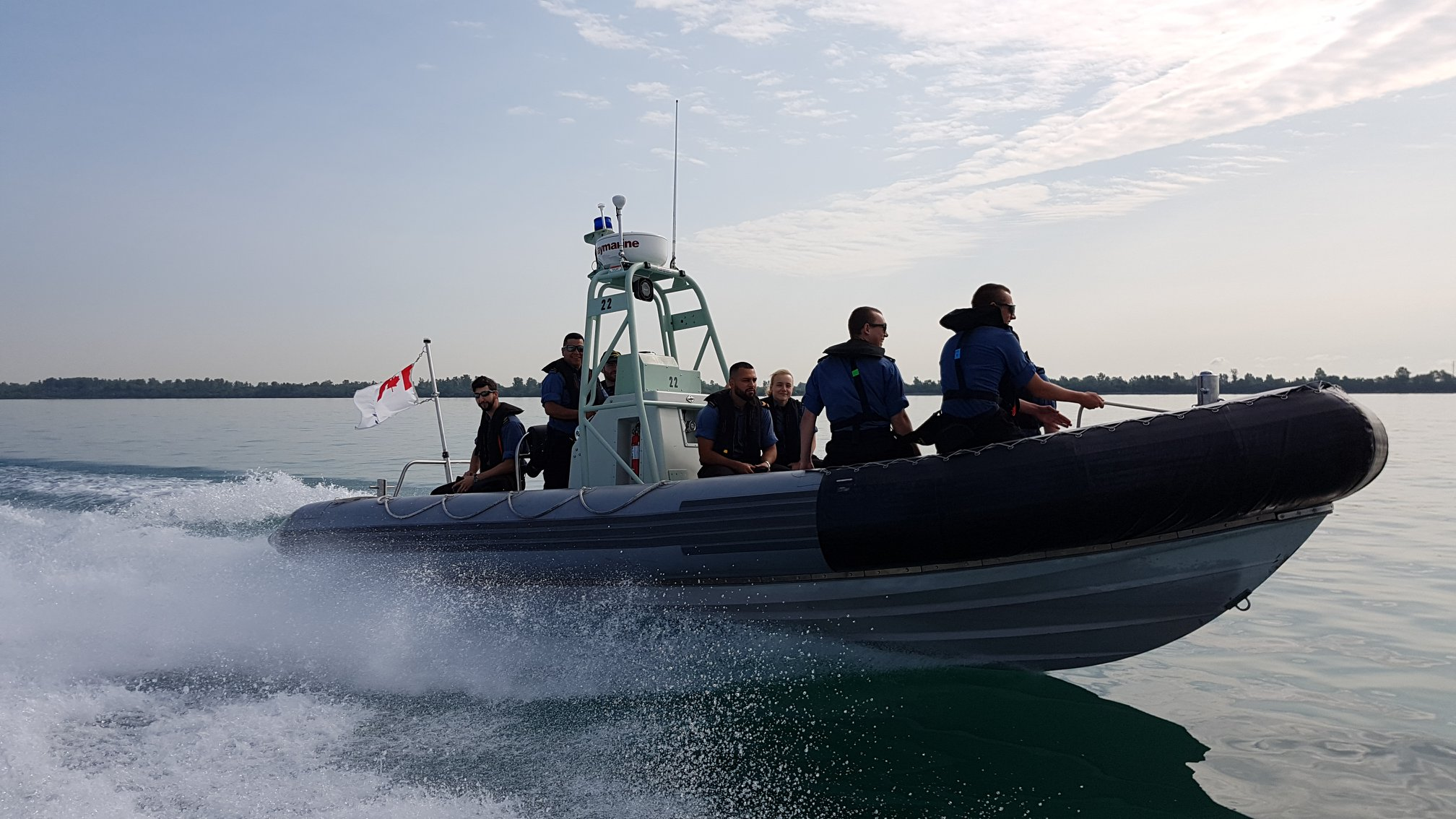
HMCS Hunter personnel conducting a small boat exercise in conjunction with HMCS NCSM Prevost, Windsor Police Service, Canadian Coast Guard Thames River Inshore Rescue Boat (IRB) 2018

== Tenders ==
=== HMCS Haidee (VR1) ===
From 1942 to 1945, HMCS Haidee (VR1) served as a tender to HMCS Hunter. Built by Ditchburn Boats Ltd., in Gravenhurst, Ontario. Prior to joining HMCS Hunter, she served as a tender to the Toronto Division of the Royal Canadian Naval Volunteer Reserve (RCNVR) from November 1939 to July 1941. She was then transferred to HMCS Star in Hamilton from 1941 to 1942 before being transferred to HMCS Hunter as a training vessel to be used by the unit during the Second World War.

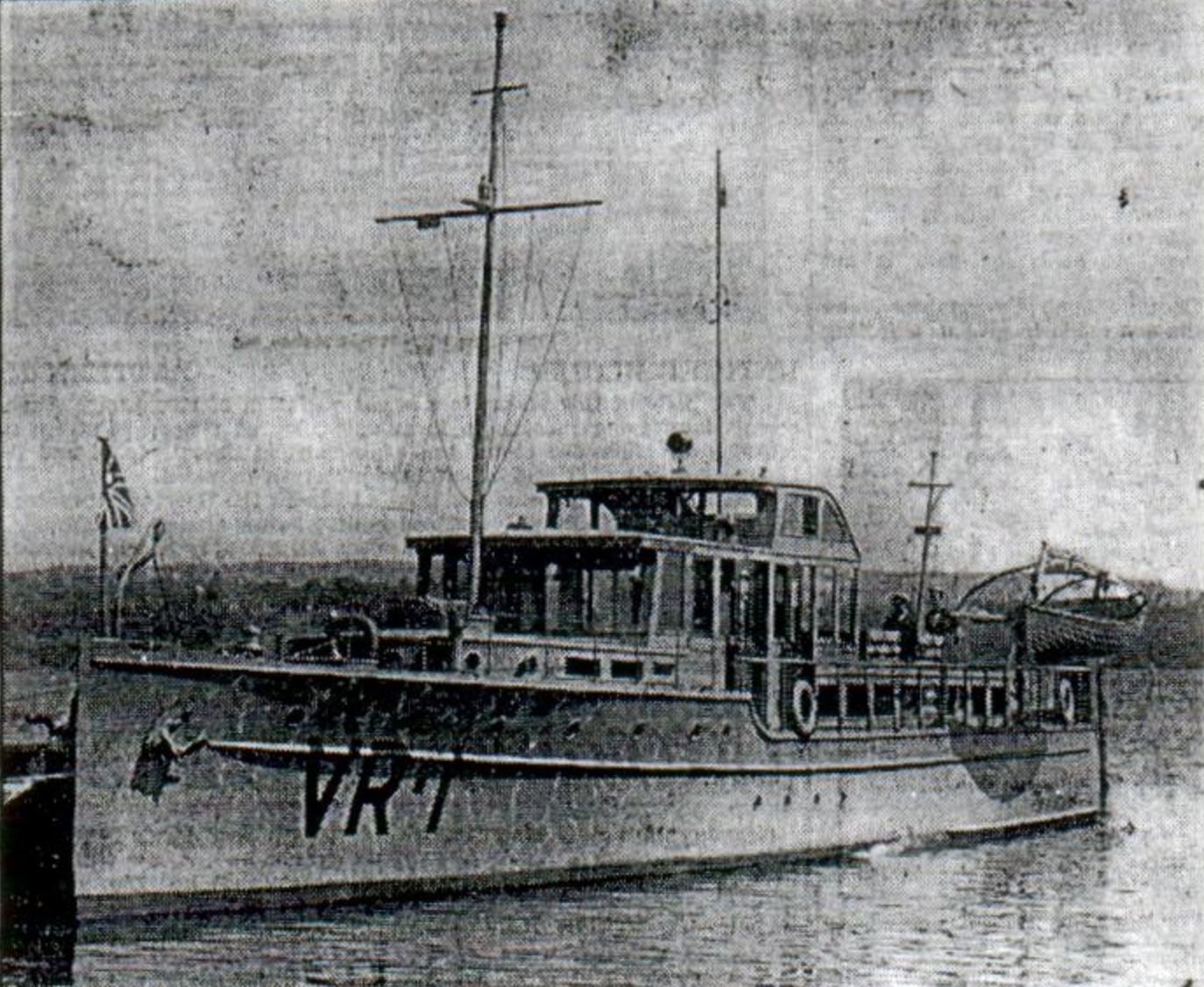
HMCS Haidee tied up in at the foot of James St in service with the Hamilton division R.C.N.V.R.

=== HMCS Wolf (PTC 762) ===
From 1949 to 1956, HMCS Wolf (PTC 762) served as a tender to HMCS Hunter. Delivered to the RCN in 1942, Hunters Fairmile-B originally served on the south coast of Newfoundland with the Free French Naval Forces out of Saint Pierre and Miquelon as Langlade V112. When she was delivered to HMCS Hunter in 1949, it is said that she still had the Cross of Lorraine painted on her bulkhead. During the winter, she was placed in winter storage at McQueen Marine Ltd. in Amherstburg, Ontario and after her end with HMCS Hunter, she was used as a breakwater in the Windsor area.

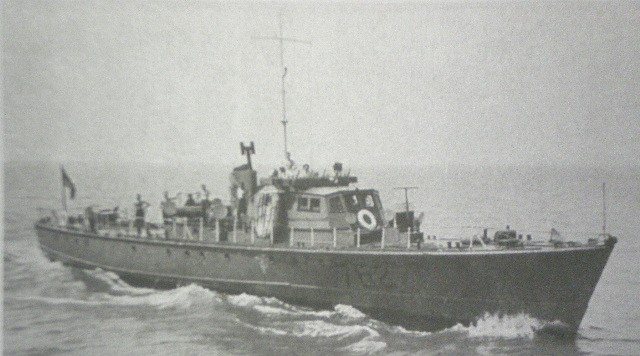
HMCS Wolf in Canadian service after the Second World War

=== Egret (925) ===
From 1970 to 1977, the 40-foot wooden high speed rescue craft was allocated to HMCS Hunter as a tender. Built by S.G. Powell Shipyard in 1952, prior to serving with Hunter, Egret served with the Royal Canadian Air Force (RCAF) as M.925 Egret at Goose Bay, Labrador until she was handed over to the RCN on 1 April 1965 C.F.A.V. Egret (YAG.3). Leaving Hunter she stayed with the RCN on the west coast until 1984.

=== YMU-116/Crossbow (197) ===
From 1977 to 1994, Crossbow (197) served as a tender to HMCS Hunter. Built by Russel Brothers Ltd. in 1954, she was originally known as YMU-116. Transferred to HMCS York in May 1994, Crossbow (197) was removed from the naval list the following year.

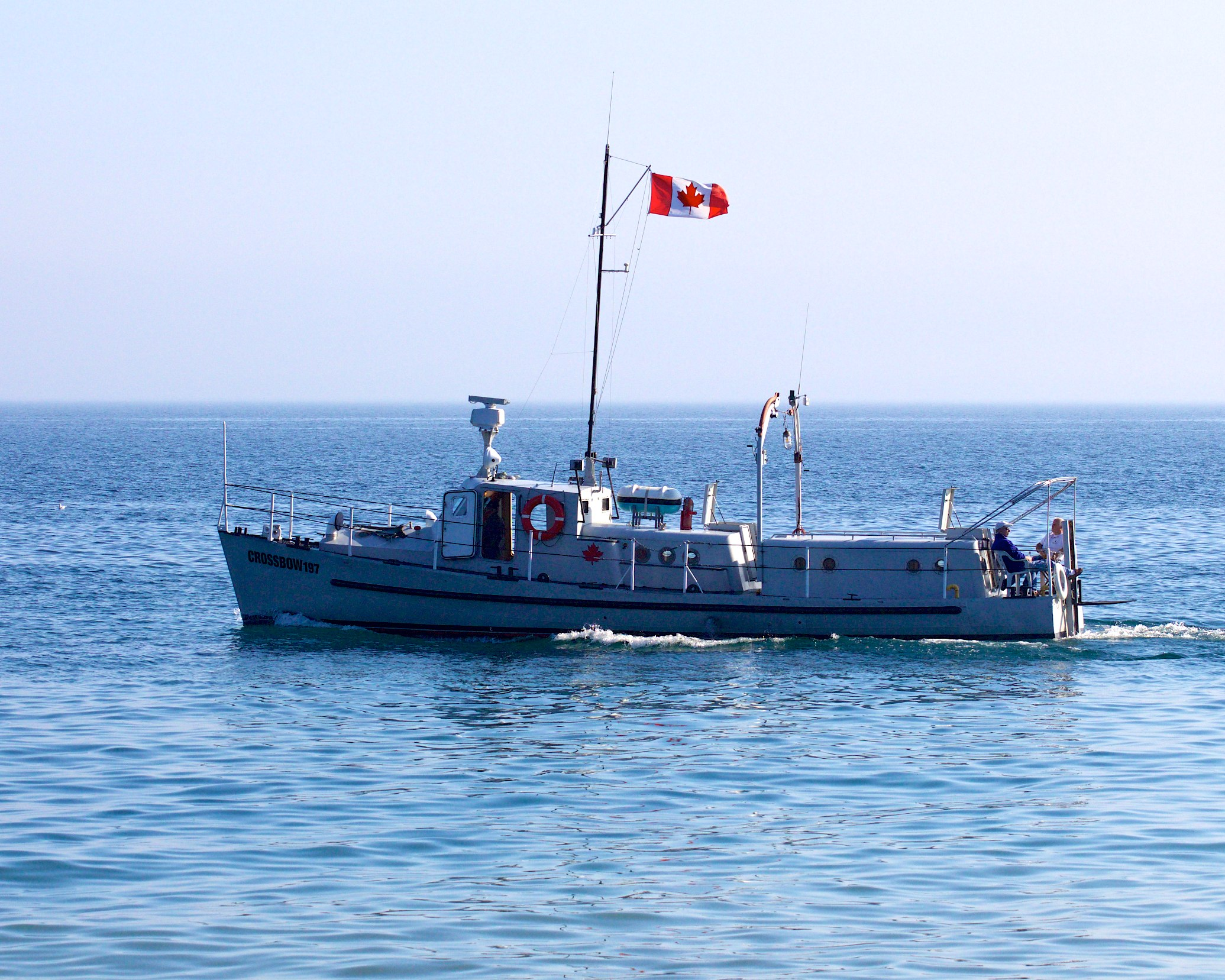
YMU-116/Crossbow (197) off Bluffers Park in 2012. Photo Paul Stillwell

== Battle Honours ==
=== Pre-The First World War ===
- Gabbard, 1653
- Scheveningen, 1653
- Barfleur, 1692
- Vigo, 1702
- Velezmalaga, 1704
- Louisburg, 1758
- Quebec, 1759

=== The Second World War ===
- Atlantic, 1939–44
- Narvik, 1940
- Salerno, 1943
- South France, 1944
- Aegean, 1944
- Burma, 1945

== Badge ==
=== Description ===
Vert a crossbow Or in bend sinister with two arrows Argent interlaced one on either side of the crossbow shaft.

== Notable former members ==
- Bruno Bitkowski – professional football player for the Hamilton Tiger Cats and Ottawa Roughriders
- Admiral Walter Hose – known as the "Father of the Canadian Navy"
- Richard Rohmer – former CEO of Toronto Airways Ltd, bestselling author, journalist and Chancellor of University of Windsor
