= HMCS Brunswicker =

- Active: 1923 to present
- Country: Canada
- Branch: Royal Canadian Navy
- Type: Stone Frigate
- Role: Reserve Unit
- Part of: Canadian Forces Naval Reserve
- Garrison/HQ: 160 Chesley Drive; Saint John, New Brunswick; E2K 5L6
- Motto(s): Pacis Tuendae Causa (In the cause of peace)
- Colours: Gold and Black
- March: Heart of Oak
- Anniversaries: Battle of the Atlantic
- Equipment: Various types of inboard and outboard rigid-hull inflatable boats
- Battle honours: None

HMCS Brunswicker is a Canadian Forces Naval Reserve Division (NRD) located in Saint John, New Brunswick. Dubbed a stone frigate, HMCS Brunswicker is a land-based naval training establishment crewed by part-time sailors and also serves as a local recruitment centre for the Canadian Forces Naval Reserve and the Royal Canadian Navy (RCN). It is one of 24 naval reserve divisions located in major cities across Canada.

== History ==
Established in 1923 as a full company of 100 sailors of the Royal Naval Canadian Volunteer Reserve (RNCVR), in 1927 the division was reduced to a half-company of 50, training sailors in basic seamanship skills such as semaphore and rope work throughout the interwar period.

Commissioned as HMCS Brunswicker in 1941, during the Second World War Brunswicker served as the primary recruiting and training establishment for the RCN in the province of New Brunswick in an annex of the Barrack Green Armoury in South Saint John. In 1995 a new facility situated on the city waterfront was built for the division.

On June 6, 2019 Brunswicker expanded to open a satellite sub-unit in Moncton, New Brunswick and in December 2019 Brunswicker was awarded with the Fenco-MacLaren Trophy by the Commander of the Naval Reserve for its innovative support to the Naval Reserve's core mission of recruiting and retention with the opening of the satellite location.

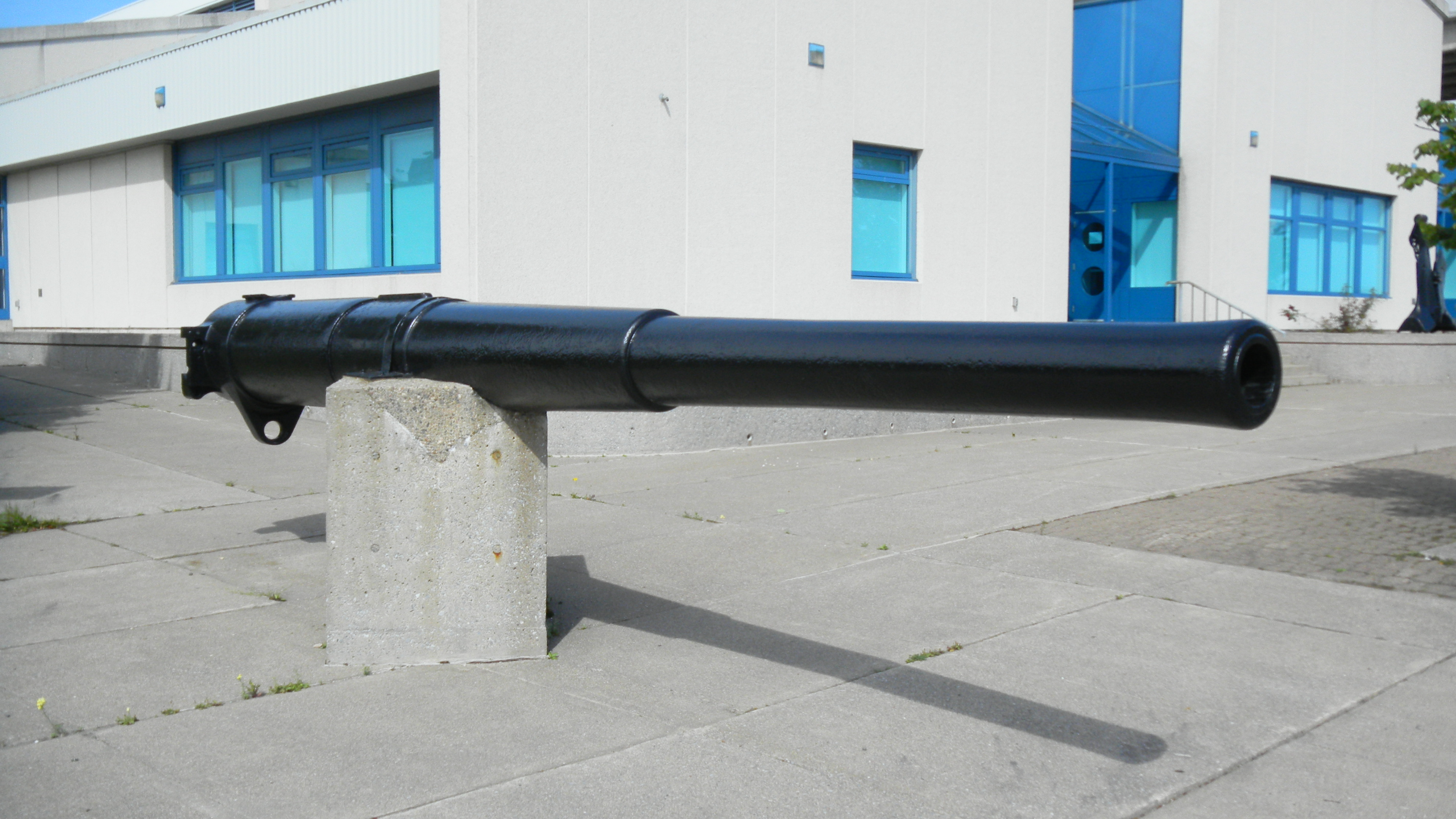
6-inch H.E.D.C. Mk. II Gun of HMCS Niobe on display at the entrance to HMCS Brunswicker, Saint John, New Brunswick.

Today, Brunswicker trains sailors and teams for Canadian Armed Forces (CAF) domestic and international operations, while at the same time supporting the Navy's efforts in connecting with Canadians through the maintenance of a broad national presence. Reservists employed at Brunswicker are individuals who are otherwise engaged in full-time civilian careers while pursuing a part-time military career as an officer or non-commissioned member. They train and work for the Navy in the evenings, on weekends and during the summer period. Most serve on a part-time basis, with no obligation to participate in any mission overseas. However, many full-time employment opportunities and deployments are available to those Reservists who volunteer for them.
