= List of Canadian Forces Naval Reserve divisions =

This is a list of Canadian Naval Reserve divisions, shore based reserve training facilities of the Royal Canadian Navy.

| Naval reserve division | City | Province |
|---|---|---|
| HMCS Brunswicker | Saint John | New Brunswick |
| HMCS Cabot | St John's | Newfoundland and Labrador |
| HMCS Carleton | Ottawa | Ontario |
| HMCS Cataraqui | Kingston | Ontario |
| HMCS Champlain | Saguenay | Quebec |
| HMCS Chippawa | Winnipeg | Manitoba |
| HMCS d'Iberville | Rimouski | Quebec |
| HMCS Discovery | Vancouver | British Columbia |
| HMCS Donnacona | Montreal | Quebec |
| HMCS Griffon | Thunder Bay | Ontario |
| HMCS Hunter | Windsor | Ontario |
| HMCS Jolliet | Sept-Îles | Quebec |
| HMCS Malahat | Victoria | British Columbia |
| HMCS Montcalm | Quebec City | Quebec |
| HMCS Nonsuch | Edmonton | Alberta |
| HMCS Prevost | London | Ontario |
| HMCS Queen | Regina | Saskatchewan |
| HMCS Queen Charlotte | Charlottetown | Prince Edward Island |
| HMCS Radisson | Trois-Rivières | Quebec |
| HMCS Scotian | Halifax | Nova Scotia |
| HMCS Star | Hamilton | Ontario |
| HMCS Tecumseh | Calgary | Alberta |
| HMCS Unicorn | Saskatoon | Saskatchewan |
| HMCS York | Toronto | Ontario |

== Christening bells ==
According to naval custom, the children of the ship's company baptized can also have their names inscribed on the ship's bell. The CFB Esquimalt Naval and Military Museum archive includes christening information from naval reserve divisions: HMCS Scotian; HMCS Queen Charlotte; HMCS Queen; HMCS Hunter; HMCS Hochelaga; HMCS Cataraqui; HMCS Hunter; HMCS Burlington.
