= HMCS d'Iberville =

Coordinates: 48.46689°N 68.50810°W

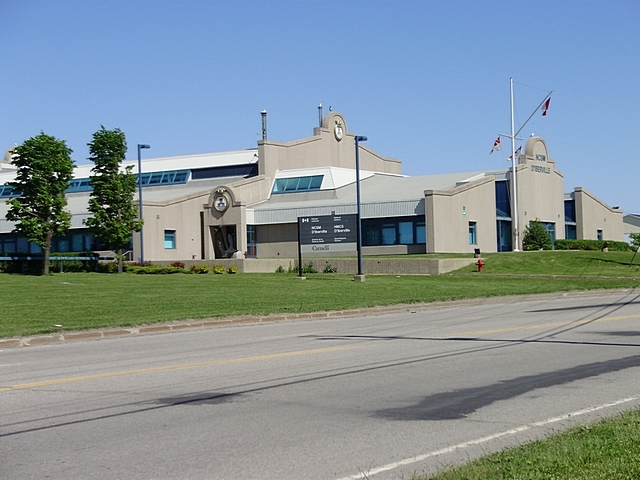
- HMCS D'Iberville (2012)
- Active: 1986 to present
- Country: Canada
- Branch: Royal Canadian Navy
- Type: Naval Reserve Division
- Role: Reserve unit
- Garrison/HQ: 84 Montée Industrielle-et-commerciale Rimouski QC G5M 1B1
- Motto(s): ENSEMBLE (Together)
- Colours: Gold and Blue
- Equipment: Various types of inboard and outboard rigid-hull inflatable boats
- Battle honours: None

HMCS d'Iberville is a Canadian Forces Naval Reserve Division (NRD) located in Rimouski, Quebec. Dubbed a stone frigate, HMCS d'Iberville is a land-based naval establishment for part-time sailors as well as a local recruitment centre for the Royal Canadian Navy (RCN). It is one of 24 naval reserve divisions located in major cities across Canada.

== Namesake ==
The name d'Iberville celebrates the name of Canadian sailor, explorer and founder of the French colony of La Louisiane, Pierre Le Moyne d'Iberville, who was born in Ville-Marie, New France.

== History ==
=== The First HMCS d'Iberville (1952 to 1961) ===
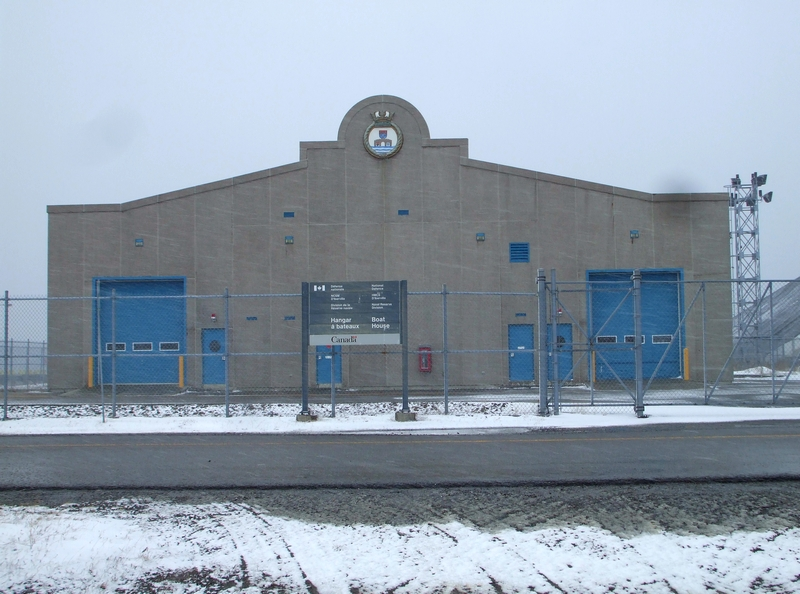
HMCS D'Iberville's Boat House at Rimouski harbour. (2013)

The first HMCS d'Iberville was commissioned as a naval school in Quebec City, Quebec. Focused on increasing the presence of French Canadians, the first HMCS d'Iberville was in operation for nine years before being paid off in 1961.

=== The Second HMCS d'Iberville (1986 to Present) ===
The current HMCS d'Iberville was authorized to stand up in 1986, and formally commissioned in 1987, operating out of temporary facilities until the unit's permanent facility was opened in Rimouski East in 1994.
