= HMCS Scotian =

Royal Canadian Navy shore establishment

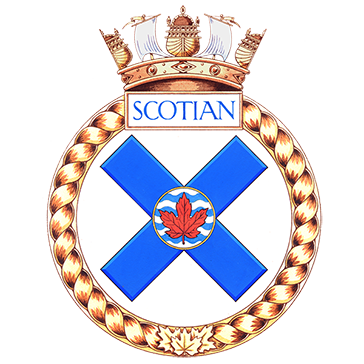
- Active: 1925 to present
- Country: Canada
- Branch: Royal Canadian Navy
- Type: Naval Reserve Division
- Role: Reserve unit
- Garrison/HQ: 2111 Barrington St Halifax, Nova Scotia
- Mottos: Fein Earbsa Thoimh Seirbhets (Self reliance through service)
- Colours: Azure Blue and White
- Equipment: 24 ft (7.3 m) RHIB (ZH-733 CDO)
- Battle honours: None

HMCS Scotian is a Royal Canadian Navy Reserve Division (NRD) located in Halifax, Nova Scotia. Dubbed a stone frigate, HMCS Scotian is a land-based naval establishment for part-time sailors as well as a local recruitment centre for the Canadian Naval Reserve.

== History ==
Established in 1925 as the Halifax Half-Company, the division was settled in the HMC Dockyard from 1925 to 1939. By 1943, the Half-company would be re-established as HMCS Haligonian and would serve as a recruiting centre for sailors during the war until 1946.

On 23 Apr 1947, the division was Re-commissioned to the unit we now know today as HMCS Scotian.

Today, HMCS Scotian trains sailors for Canadian Armed Forces (CAF) both domestic and international operations, while at the same time supporting the Navy's efforts in connecting with Canadian through the maintenance of a broad national presence.
