= HMCS Griffon =

Coordinates: 48.44006°N 89.21991°W

- Active: 1937 to present
- Country: Canada
- Branch: Royal Canadian Navy
- Type: Naval Reserve Division
- Role: Reserve unit
- Garrison/HQ: 125 Algoma St N, Thunder Bay, ON P7A 4Z5
- Motto(s): PRIMA IN LACUBUS (First on the Lakes)
- Colours: White and Blue
- Equipment: Various types of inboard and outboard rigid-hull inflatable boats
- Battle honours: None

HMCS Griffon is a Royal Canadian Naval Reserve Division (NRD) located in Thunder Bay, Ontario. Dubbed a stone frigate, HMCS Griffon is a land-based naval establishment for part-time sailors as well as a local recruitment centre for the Royal Canadian Naval Reserve. It is one of Royal Canadian Naval Reserve divisions 24 naval reserve divisions located in major cities across Canada.

== History ==
HMCS Griffon was first established on 3 May 1937 as the Royal Canadian Navy Volunteer Reserve (RCNVR) Half-Company Port Arthur. As the unit did not have its own facility, the Half-Company joined militia soldiers from the Lake Superior Regiment at the Port Arthur Armoury.

In 1941 she was commissioned as a tender to HMCS Naden and re-named HMCS Griffon and then re-commissioned as an independent shore establishment in 1942.

HMCS Griffon moved into its current location at 125 Algoma St North in Thunder Bay in 1944.

During the Second World War, HMCS Griffon recruited and trained over 2400 volunteers for the Royal Canadian Navy and became home to the commissioning crews for corvettes and minesweepers built in Thunder Bay.
