= Bruno Bitkowski =

Canadian football player (1929–1966)

No. 40
- Positions: Centre, Defensive end

Personal information
- Born: November 29, 1929; Windsor, Ontario, Canada
- Died: February 10, 1966 (aged 36); Ottawa, Ontario, Canada
- Listed height: 6 ft 2 in (1.88 m)
- Listed weight: 220 lb (100 kg)

Career information
- CJFL: Assumption College Junior

Career history
- 1951–1962: Ottawa Rough Riders

Awards and highlights
- 2× Grey Cup champion (1951, 1960); Gruen Trophy (1951); Ottawa Rough Riders #40 retired

Bruno Bitkowski (November 11, 1929 – February 10, 1966) was an all-star Canadian football centre for the Ottawa Rough Riders for eleven seasons. Bitkowski was a Grey Cup champion twice (1951 and 1960) and won the Gruen Trophy as best rookie in the Big Four in 1951. The Rough Riders retired his number (#40).

The Bruno Bitkowski Memorial Trophy was given to the outstanding lineman in the Canadian Inter-university Sport (CIS) Football league and was awarded to the most gentlemanly male athlete, from its inception in 1966 until the award was retired in 1986.

Bruno Bitkowski was appointed as a Naval Cadet (UNTD) in the Royal Canadian Naval Reserve serving with HMCS Hunter for the UNTD (University Naval Training Division) from 1950–51.

== Notes ==
- Bio
