= HMCS Cabot =

- Active: 1949 to present
- Country: Canada
- Branch: Royal Canadian Navy
- Part of: Canadian Forces Naval Reserve
- Garrison/HQ: 220 Southside Road; Pier 27; St. John's, Newfoundland and Labrador; A1C 6B5
- Colours: White and Vermilion
- Equipment: Various types of inboard and outboard rigid-hull inflatable boats

HMCS Cabot is a Canadian Forces Naval Reserve Division (NRD) located in St. John's, Newfoundland and Labrador. Dubbed a stone frigate, HMCS Cabot is a land-based naval training establishment crewed by part-time sailors and also serves as a local recruitment centre for the Canadian Forces Naval Reserve. It is one of 24 naval reserve divisions located in major cities across Canada.

== History ==
Since its commissioning in 1949, HMCS Cabot has paraded at three stone frigates in St. John's, Newfoundland. Initially commissioned at Buckmaster's Field, HMCS Cabot was part of a Tri-Force Headquarters along with the Army and Air Force.

The original Ship's Company were sailors who served in World War II as part of the Royal Navy, Royal Navy Reserve, and the Royal Canadian Naval Reserve. The first parade on 20 September 1949 consisted of 11 officers, 29 men and 26 University Naval Training Division (UNTD) Cadets. It was thought that the unit was commissioned at the beginning of the academic year, well before it was ‘properly organised or prepared’, to accommodate the UNTD Cadets so they might commence their naval training as soon as possible. All administrative issues quickly being overcome, the past operational experience and seamanship of the Ship's Company became readily apparent when they sailed the unit tender, HMCS Revelstoke, to Bermuda in 1951, participating in naval exercises en route.

In the 1950s and 1960s, HMCS Cabot was quite the social hub with many functions in the community including Christmas and New Year Balls, Valentine's Day dances, Mess Dinners, Trafalgar balls along with less-formal children's parties, lobster boil-ups, and open houses and receptions for visiting ships. The increase in members, and the demand for more space to house the growing unit, prompted the move to Building 314 in Pleasantville, the former United States army base. This move helped HMCS Cabot distinguish itself and form its own identity separate from the Tri-Force HQ at Buckmaster's Field.

One of the threads that have helped form a cohesive unit throughout HMCS Cabot's history is participation in sport. Hockey had been a favorite sport of many of Cabot members, and the unit often played against other teams in the Civil Service Hockey League in the early 1960s. Basketball, bowling, swimming, and softball all helped the members come together as a team. A women's volleyball team was very active in the local city league in the early 1980's and won the B Division in 1983. Rowing in the annual Royal St. John's Regatta was also very important and a source of great pride in the perseverance of excellence. This tradition was recently taken up once again as Cabot members rowed as part of the CFS ST JOHNS team in several regattas in 2008.

Cabot enjoyed the use of many tenders throughout its sixty-year history: Revelstoke, and Langara were replaced by Acadian, which was transferred to NCSM Donnacona. PB 199 Standoff, a former RCMP boat, was sent to HMCS Cabot in 1980. Standoff was a 75-foot wooden vessel, and could crew six to nine sailors comfortably. It had two Cummins V-12 diesel engines, capable of 1400 hp and a top speed of 16 knots. This vessel served HMCS Cabot for seventeen years, performing many tasks at home and abroad, including circumnavigating the island, wreath laying ceremonies, and various training exercises, before being retired in 1996.

There was a long standing desire to have a training facility on or near the water. After much consultation, a prime location on the South Side of St. John's Harbour, Pier 27, was chosen as the new berth for the stone frigate. This placed HMCS Cabot between the Canadian Coast Guard and the Marine Institute's training school. The boathouse at Pier 27 opened on 5 January 1998, and the state-of-the-art training facility at Pier 27 opened on 19 February 2000. This provided the unit with the ability to train personnel in many fields to prepare for operational deployments and trade coursing.
