= HMCS Jolliet =

- Active: 1989 to present
- Country: Canada
- Branch: Royal Canadian Navy
- Type: Naval Reserve Division
- Role: Reserve unit
- Garrison/HQ: 366, rue Arnaud Sept-Îles, Quebec G4R 3A7
- Mottos: OMNIA PERRUMPIMUS (Nothing Can Stop Us)
- Colours: Gold and Blue
- Equipment: Various types of inboard and outboard rigid-hull inflatable boats
- Battle honours: None

HMCS Jolliet is a Canadian Forces Naval Reserve Division (NRD) located in Sept-Îles, Quebec. Dubbed a stone frigate, HMCS Jolliet is a land-based naval training establishment crewed by part-time sailors and also serves as a local recruitment centre for the Canadian Forces Naval Reserve. It is one of 24 naval reserve divisions located in major cities across Canada.

== Namesake ==
HMCS Jolliet is named after French-Canadian explorer Louis Jolliet, who made a number of discoveries in North America, including discovering the Mississippi River.

== History ==
HMCS Jolliet was established on 7 October 1989 in an effort to expand the presence of the Royal Canadian Navy in the French speaking province of Quebec. Originally housed in a former elementary school leased from the local school board, HMCS Jolliet moved its operations to a new facility on rue Arnaud in 1993.
