= HMCS Unicorn =

- Active: 1923–present
- Country: Canada
- Branch: Royal Canadian Navy
- Type: Stone frigate
- Part of: Canadian Forces Naval Reserve
- Garrison/HQ: 405 24 Street East, Saskatoon, Saskatchewan
- Mottos: Unicus est (Latin for 'the only one of its kind; unequalled')
- Colours: Royal blue and white
- Equipment: Various types of inboard and outboard rigid-hull inflatable boats
- Battle honours: Armada, 1588; Cadiz, 1596; Porto Farina, 1655; Santa Cruz, 1657; Lowestoft, 1665; Orfordness, 1666; Sole Bay, 1672; Schooneveld, 1673; Texel, 1673; Vestale, 1761; Tribune, 1796; Basque Roads, 1809; Salerno, 1943; Okinawa, 1945; Korea, 1950–53

HMCS Unicorn is a Canadian Forces Naval Reserve division (NRD) in Saskatoon, Saskatchewan. Dubbed a stone frigate, Unicorn is a land-based naval training establishment crewed by part-time sailors and also serves as a local recruitment centre for the Royal Canadian Navy (RCN). It is one of 24 naval reserve divisions in major cities across Canada.

== Namesake ==
Warships bearing the name Unicorn were part of the Royal Navy dating back to 1544.

== History ==
HMCS Unicorn is a Naval Reserve Division of the Royal Canadian Navy based in Saskatoon, Saskatchewan. Established on 27 April 1923 as the Saskatoon Half-Company Royal Canadian Naval Volunteer Reserve (RCNVR) under the command of First World War veteran Lieutenant John McEown, Unicorn has been a cornerstone of Saskatoon for nearly a century. Unicorn was first quartered in the downtown Armoury at 152 Spadina Avenue, moving to the British Empire Service League building 403 21st Street East at the corner of 21st Street and 4th Avenue in June 1930. In 1934, the burgeoning ship's company moved again, to 378 1st Avenue North the corner of 1st Avenue and 25th Street to a former car dealership and garage. In 1935 was renamed The Saskatoon Division RCNVR. The ship moved to its present location in 1943, 405 24th Street East, when a purpose-built brown brick building with white trim became Saskatoon's stone frigate at the corner of 4th Avenue and 24th Street, across from City Hall. On 1 November 1941 the unit was commissioned as HMCS Unicorn, and in 1948 it received is official badge.

In 1941, the Saskatoon Half-Company was commissioned as a land-based ship and named after one of the first vessels to enter Hudson Bay in search of the Northwest Passage in 1619. Bearing a badge depicting a unicorn with wings, Unicorn maintains its uniqueness among other naval reserve divisions. The badge was adopted in 1948 from the Royal Navy, which often added wings to its badges after a particularly arduous endeavour.

The ship's company played an active part in the life of Saskatoon and the surrounding communities, fielding sports teams, hosting public events and even helping with harvest. During the Second World War, Unicorn became a focal point for the Royal Canadian Navy's wartime efforts in Saskatoon, becoming a naval recruiting centre. 3,573 officers and non-commissioned members enlisted and received their initial training on board.

Unicorn continues to play a prominent role in Saskatoon. Members of the ship's company have served with the Canadian Forces in Afghanistan, the former Yugoslavia, Namibia and southwest Africa, Cyprus, the Golan Heights, Germany, Great Britain, France, Holland, the United States, in the Gulf War, and in every Canadian province. Both in 1950 and 1997, members of Unicorn volunteered to assist with efforts to cope with the flooding of Manitoba's Red River. Closer to home, Unicorn helped deal with flooding in the South Saskatchewan River valley and have aided local protective services in operations on the river. The unit has provided safety boats to community boating events, with the ship's nine-pounder gun often used to start the final races. Members of the ship's company have even spent weekends in a life raft tethered to one of Saskatoon's bridges to raise money for local crisis shelters.

In 2019, Unicorn was awarded the Commodore's Cup for best overall naval reserve division in Canada. The ship's company was recognized for its community involvement in the wake of the Humboldt Broncos bus crash and for its service to the Ronald McDonald House Charities.

== Bands ==
Unicorn maintained a military band in the 1960s, as a result of the reorganization of Canadian military bands. Its foundation came from the disbanding of the 23rd Wing Band and the Kinsmen Concert Band. The band is the descendant of what is today the Saskatoon Concert Band. Another band, founded in October 1995 by a member of the National Band of the Naval Reserve in Halifax, is the Stone Frigate Big Band, which was created by Louis Christ as a way to bring military music to Saskatoon.

== HMCS Unicorn Memorial ==
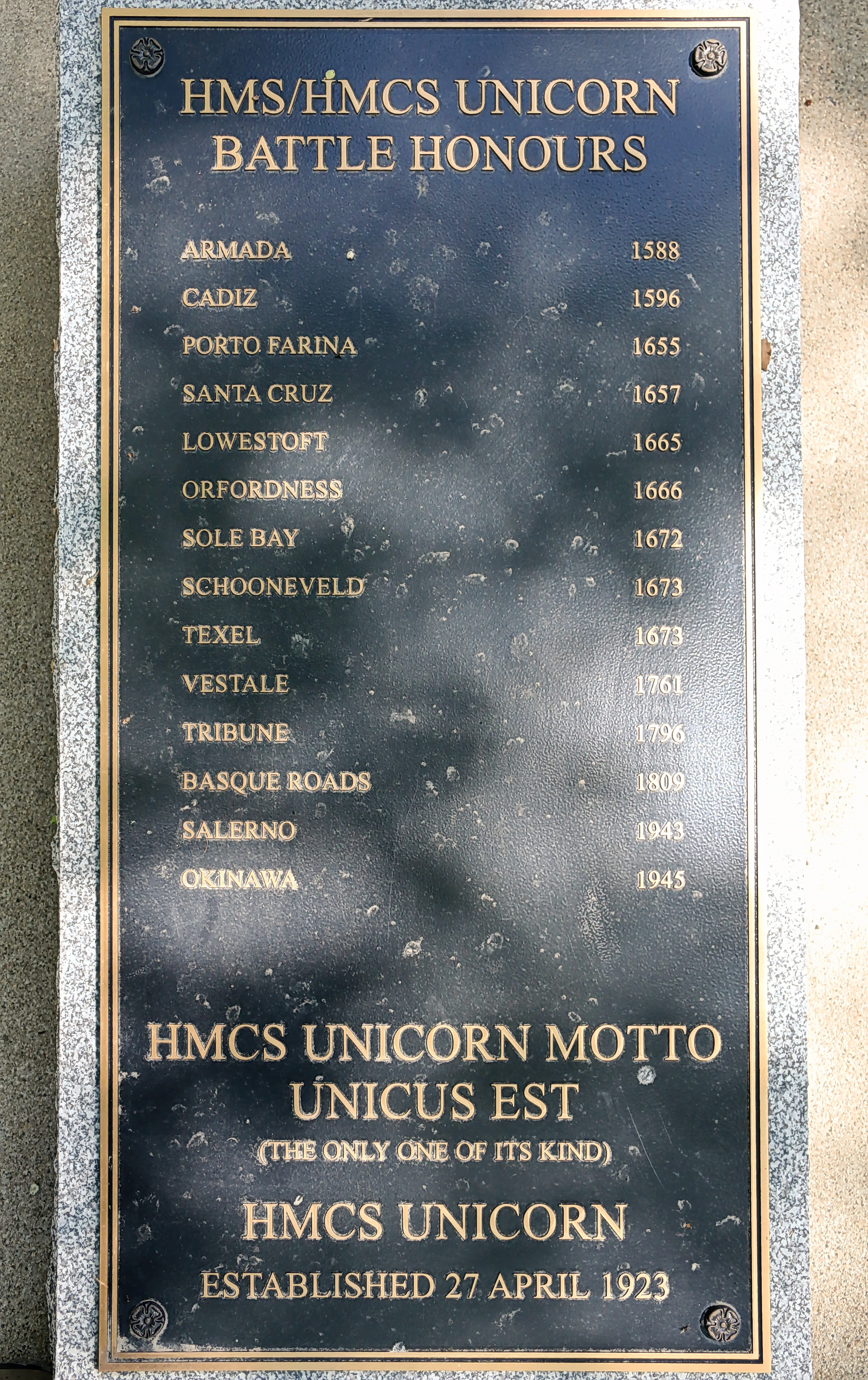

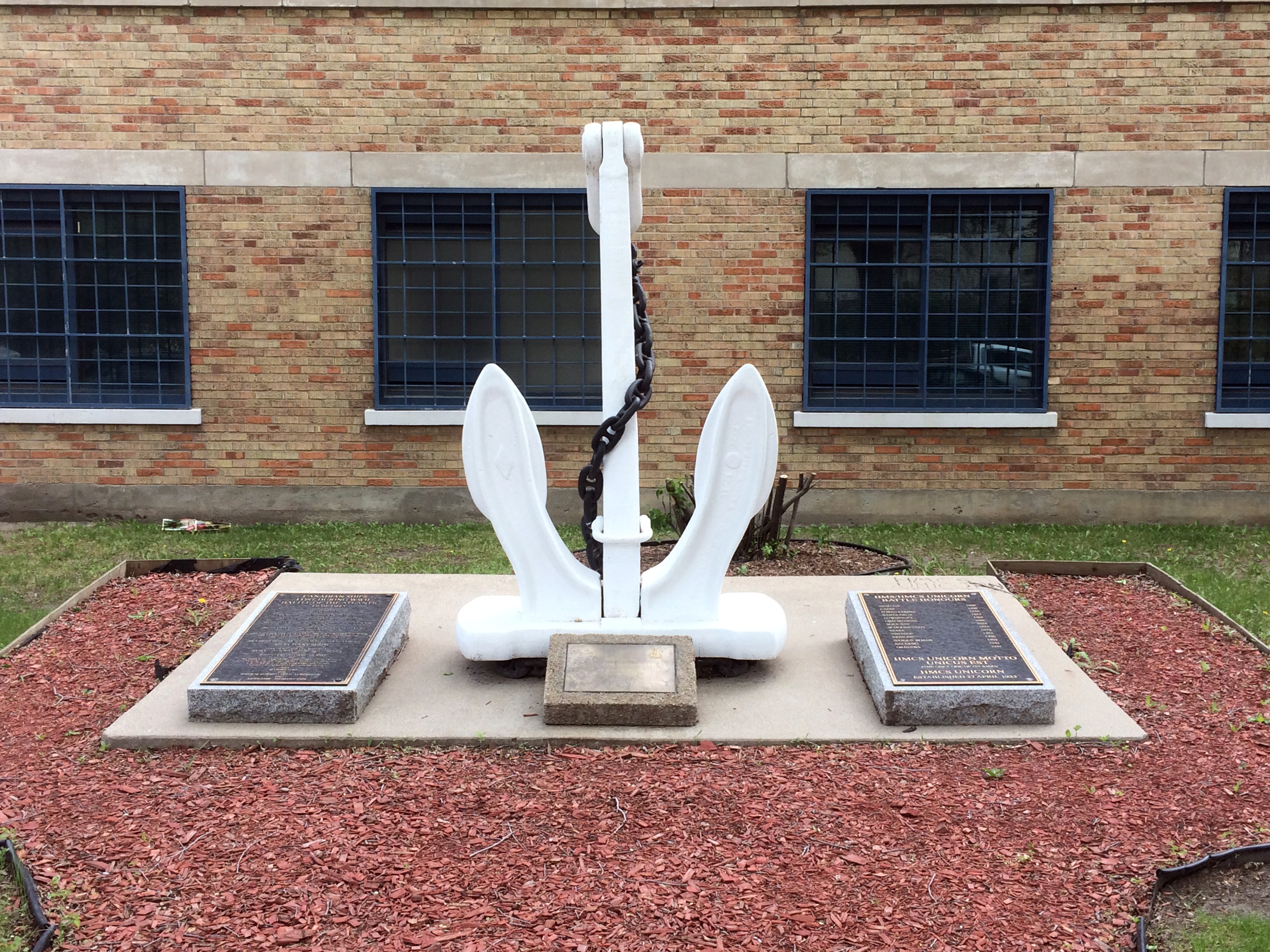

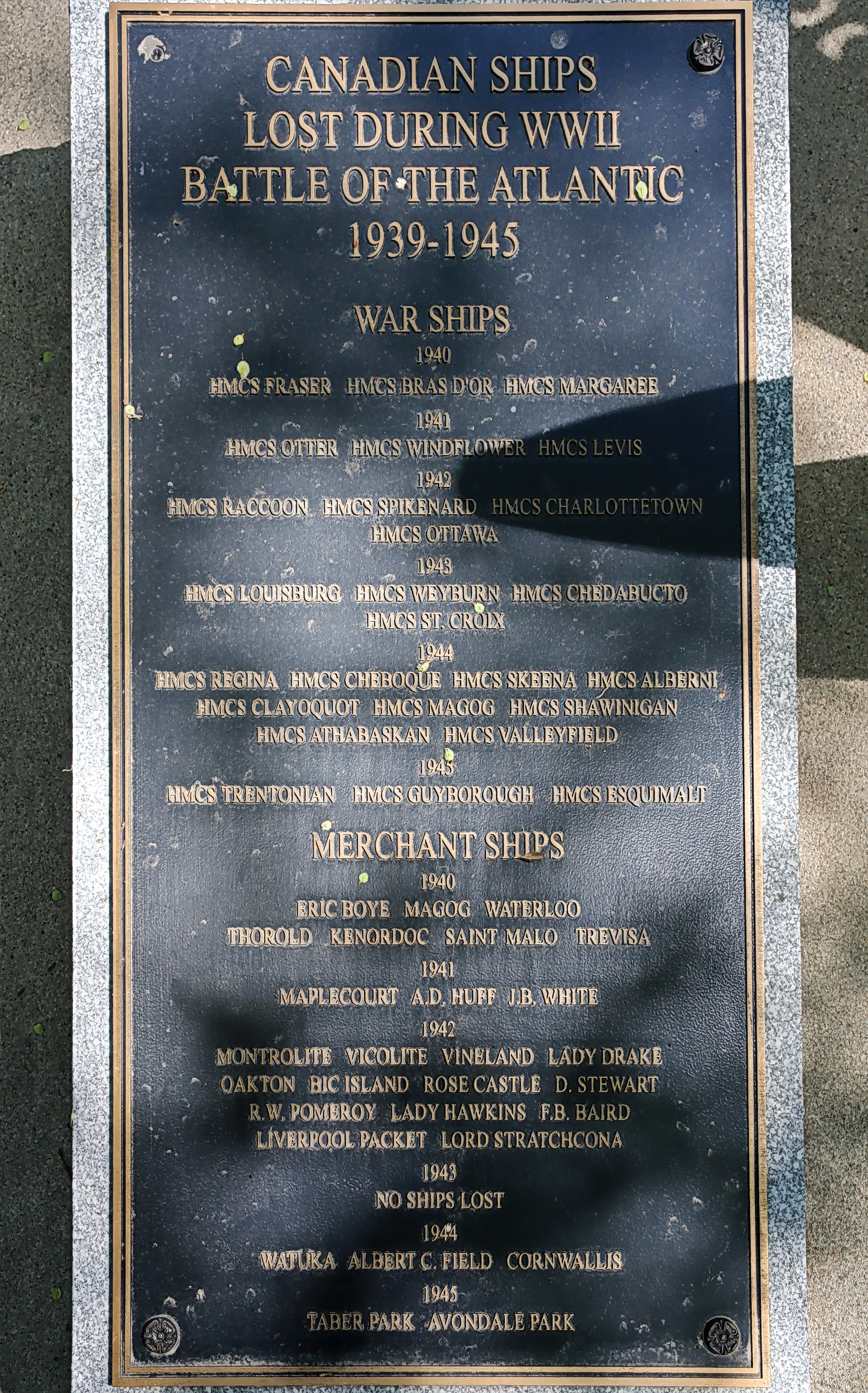
