= HMCS Cataraqui =

Canadian Naval Reserve unit

- Active: 1939 to present
- Country: Canada
- Branch: Royal Canadian Navy
- Part of: Canadian Forces Naval Reserve
- Garrison/HQ: Kingston, Ontario
- Mottos: Porta Lacuum, Portus Classis (Gate of the lakes, port of the fleet)
- Colours: Azure Blue and Gold
- Equipment: Various types of inboard and outboard rigid-hull inflatable boats
- Battle honours: None

Commanders
- Commanding Officer: Commander R. Passey
- Executive Officer: Lieutenant Commander R. Marriott
- Coxswain: Chief Petty Officer 2nd Class D. Archibald

HMCS Cataraqui is a Canadian Forces Naval Reserve Division (NRD) located in Kingston, Ontario. Dubbed a stone frigate, HMCS Cataraqui is a land-based naval establishment operated by members of the Primary Reserve and serves as a local recruitment centre for the Royal Canadian Navy (RCN). It is one of 24 naval reserve divisions located in major cities across Canada.

== History ==
Established on the site of the old Feed Mill at the foot of Princess Street in 1939, HMCS Cataraqui was first commissioned as a tender to HMCS Stadacona on 1 November 1941 and then recommissioned as an independent shore establishment on 1 September 1942. From 1943 to 1959, Cataraqui occupied a former school at 47 Wellington Street that also served as the Kingston Badminton Club.

After the Second World War, apart from recruiting and training naval reservists in Kingston with its "fleet" of two harbour craft and a Ville class tug, the unit also undertook training of sailors in Brockville, Gananoque, Napanee, Belleville and Picton. The unit also housed a University Naval Training Division (UNTD), a program that aimed to secure recruits who will otherwise enter the army's COTC Canadian Officers Training Corps or the air force's University Air Training Plan (UATP).

In September 1953, naval air squadron VC 921 was formed under the command of Lieutenant-Commander (Pilot) Allen Burgham in Kingston. As a tender to Cataraqui, the naval air squadron maintained a facility at Norman Rogers airfield operating Harvards and one C-45D Expeditor until it was disbanded in 1959. As a result of clocking 1,092 accident-free flying hours in its inaugural year, the squadron was the first to win the Naval Reserve Safe Flying Award presented by Commodore K.F. Adams CD, RCN, Commanding Officer Naval Reserve Divisions.

In 1959, the unit moved into a new facility located across from the Royal Military College of Canada (RMC) campus until 1972 when the building was transferred to the RMC. Needing a new home, Cataraqui moved to the Kingston Armoury located at 100 Montréal Street. In 1992, the unit once again moved into its new building at 24 Navy Way, where today naval reservists train towards contributing to Canadian Armed Forces (CAF) operations, including: domestic safety operations as well as security and defence missions, while at the same time supporting the Navy's efforts in connecting with Canadians.

== Tenders ==
- HMC "PTC 721" - Fairmile B motor launch (1948-1950)
- HMCS Loganville - Ville Class Tug (1948-1956)
- PB 192 Detector - ex-RCMP patrol boat
- YMU-116 / Crossbow 197 (1969-1995)

NLCC Cataraqui https://www.kingstoncadets.ca/aboutnlcc RCSCC St.lawrence https://www.kingstoncadets.ca/rcscchome
