= Canadian Forces Naval Reserve =

Naval Reserve
- Réserve navale
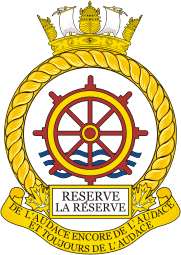
- Badge of the Naval Reserve
- Active: 1968–present
- Country: Canada
- Branch: Royal Canadian Navy
- Type: Reserve force
- Role: Strategic reserve
- Size: 5,100 Reserve personnel
- Garrison/HQ: Quebec City, Quebec
- Mottos: De l'audace, encore de l'audace, toujours de l'audace (French for 'We must dare, and dare again, and go on daring')
- Website: canada.ca/en/navy/corporate/our-organization/structure/navres.html

Commanders
- Commander Naval Reserve: Commodore Beth Vallis
- Formation Chief Naval Reserve: CPO1 Robert Campbell

The Naval Reserve (NAVRES, French: Réserve navale) is the Primary Reserve component of the Royal Canadian Navy (RCN). The primary mission of the NAVRES is force generation of sailors and teams for Canadian Armed Forces (CAF) operations, including domestic safety operations as well as security and defence missions, while at the same time supporting the RCN's efforts in connecting with Canadians through the maintenance of a broad national presence.

== History ==
=== Royal Naval Canadian Volunteer Reserve (1914–1918) ===
Canada's modern Naval Reserve finds its origins with the Royal Naval Canadian Volunteer Reserve (RNCVR) created on 14 May 1914 under the provisions of Naval Service Act. Organised into Atlantic, Lake and Pacific subcommands, 8,000 Canadians enlisted for service in the RNCVS during the First World War. Agreeing to serve in wartime with either the RCN or the British Royal Navy, members of the RNCVR crewed 160 vessels, patrolling the shores of Canada and conducting convoy escort duties. The RNCVR was extinguished four years later and its personnel demobilized following the end of the war in 1918.

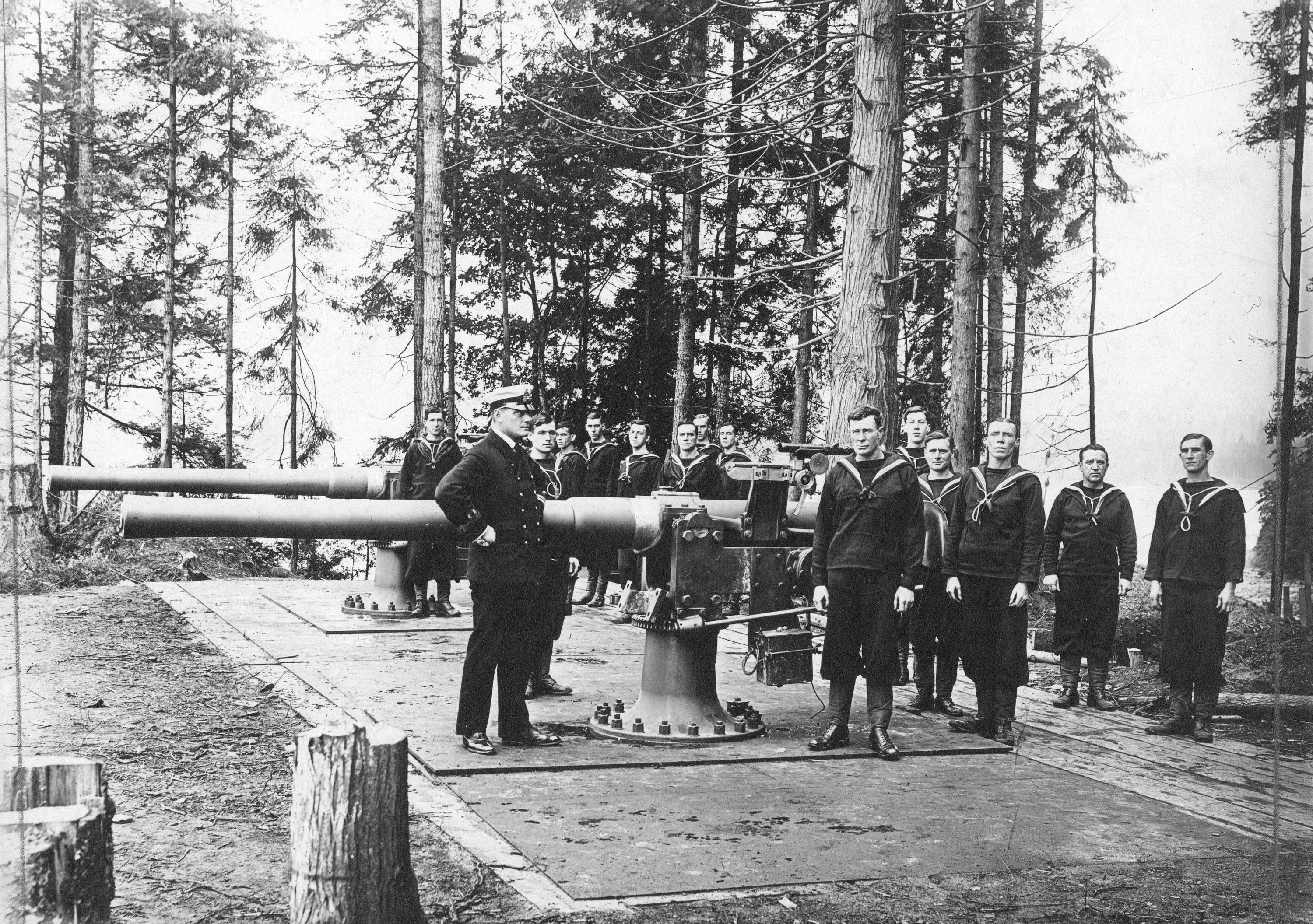
The Royal Canadian Naval Volunteer Reserve at the QF 4-inch gun emplacement near Ferguson Point, Stanley Park, Vancouver. - Aug 1914

=== Royal Canadian Navy Volunteer Reserve (1923–1945) ===
In 1923, the Royal Canadian Naval Volunteer Reserve (RCNVR) was stood up and under the command of Rear-Admiral Walter Hose who authorized the creation of NRDs in every major Canadian city. In 1941 Naval Reserve divisions were granted the designations ‘His Majesty’s Canadian ships’ and received its own command and a seat on the Naval Board. The new naval reserve establishment formed a robust reserve force building popular support amongst Canadians for the fledgling Canadian Navy. During the Second World War, the RCNVR became the backbone of the Canadian Navy, recruiting officers and sailors for the Navy. By the end of the war, Canada possessed the third-largest navy in the world, with a complement of nearly 100,000. Most of these men and women were members of the RCNVR.

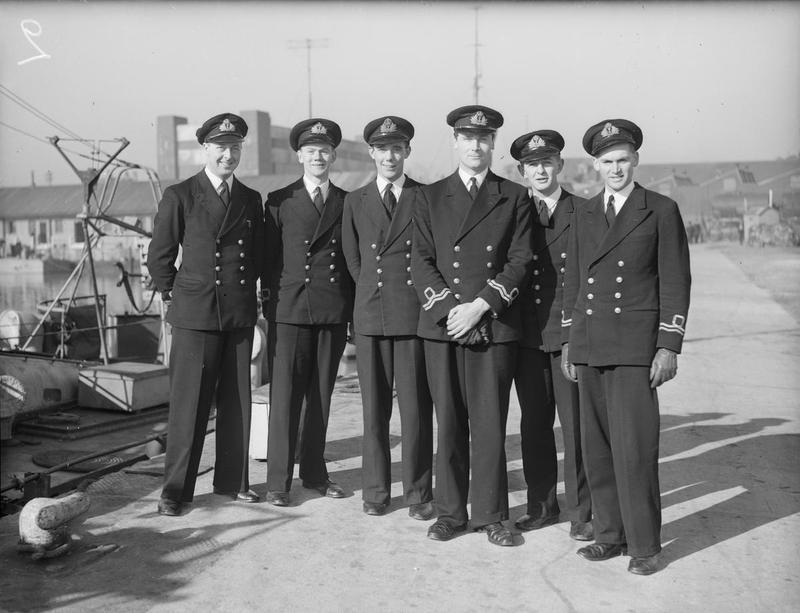
Lieut C A Burke, RCNVR (Far Left), with Royal Navy Volunteer Reserve officers after engaging a group of German E Boats in the North Sea in 1943

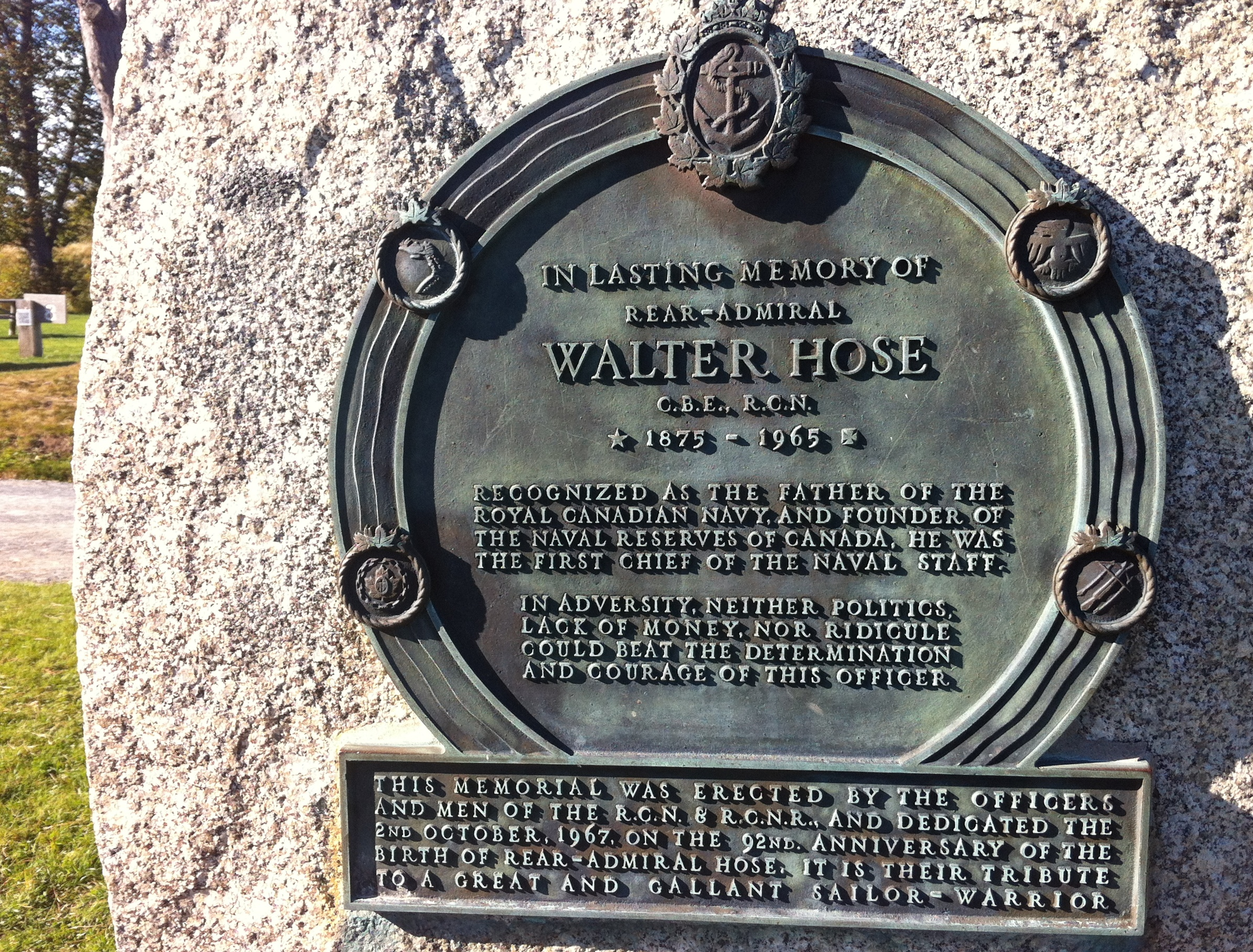
Walter Hose Monument, Point Pleasant Park, Halifax, Nova Scotia

=== Naval Reserve (1945–1968) ===
With the end of the Second World War, the Naval Reserve was formed in 1945 replacing the RCNVR. Expected to maintain the same level of skill as the Regular Force, training and pay for reservists was equalised. Focused on minesweeping, escort, and coastal patrol; each division mirrored its organisation, training and crew with all officer branches and non-commissioned trades across the fleet. Despite successfully expanding the University Naval Training Division (UNTD), forming a dedicated 'Commanding Officer, Naval Divisions' command in 1953 and attaching various tender craft to NRDs; the Naval Reserve experienced suffered a decline in skill due to focusing on generalist skills and lack of opportunities to sea-going ships leading up to the unification of the Canadian Forces in 1968.

=== Canadian Forces Naval Reserve (1968–1990) ===
With the unification of the Canadian Forces, the Naval Reserve was renamed the Canadian Forces Naval Reserve and years of decline set in. With no combat capability, except the Naval Reserve Naval Control of Shipping (NCS) program, the Naval Reserve lost political advocacy and was left out of any formal role in the Canadian Forces defence structure. Left outside the Canadian Forces structure, the Naval Reserve would rely on new and unique ways of keeping relevant during the Cold War years. With the UNTD program shuttered, for example, NRDs worked to expand their recruiting numbers by employing students at local level, and force generating sailors initially trained at the unit level to serve on major warships. Years of decline was finally ended with Canada's 1987 White Paper on defence policy Challenge and Commitments.

=== Canadian Forces Naval Reserve (1990–2001) ===
With more integration of the Primary Reserve into the 'Total Force Concept' as outlined by the 1987 Defence White Paper, and then confirmed in the 1994 follow-up white paper, the NAVRES was tasked with providing niche capabilities to assist the Regular Force. One such task undertaken by the NAVRES was to spearhead enhancing RCN mine countermeasures operation capabilities and by crewing twelve new Kingston-class coastal defence vessels, that since their introduction in 1996, have significantly contributed to Canadian maritime security and allied commitments, both domestically and internationally. The NAVRES was additionally tasked with maintaining standing port inspection diver teams, supporting regional dive centres and supplying four non-standing port security units and four naval co-operation and guidance for shipping (the former NCS, now NCAGS) units.

== Mission ==
The mission of the NAVRES is to generate trained individuals and teams for CAF operations, including domestic safety operations as well as security and defence missions, while at the same time supporting the RCN's efforts in connecting with Canadians through the maintenance of a broad national presence.

The tasks of the NAVRES is to:

1. Respond to domestic safety operations with trained sailors and small boat expertise.
2. Provide specific unique skill sets for security missions for the RCN.
3. Augment the fleet on any platform or shore capacity for defence missions, both at home and abroad.
4. Provide the linkage for the RCN to local communities.

NAVRES fills a number of roles within the Total Force Plan. In addition to augmenting the Regular Force, naval reservists form diving units and public relations units such as the National Band of the Naval Reserve.

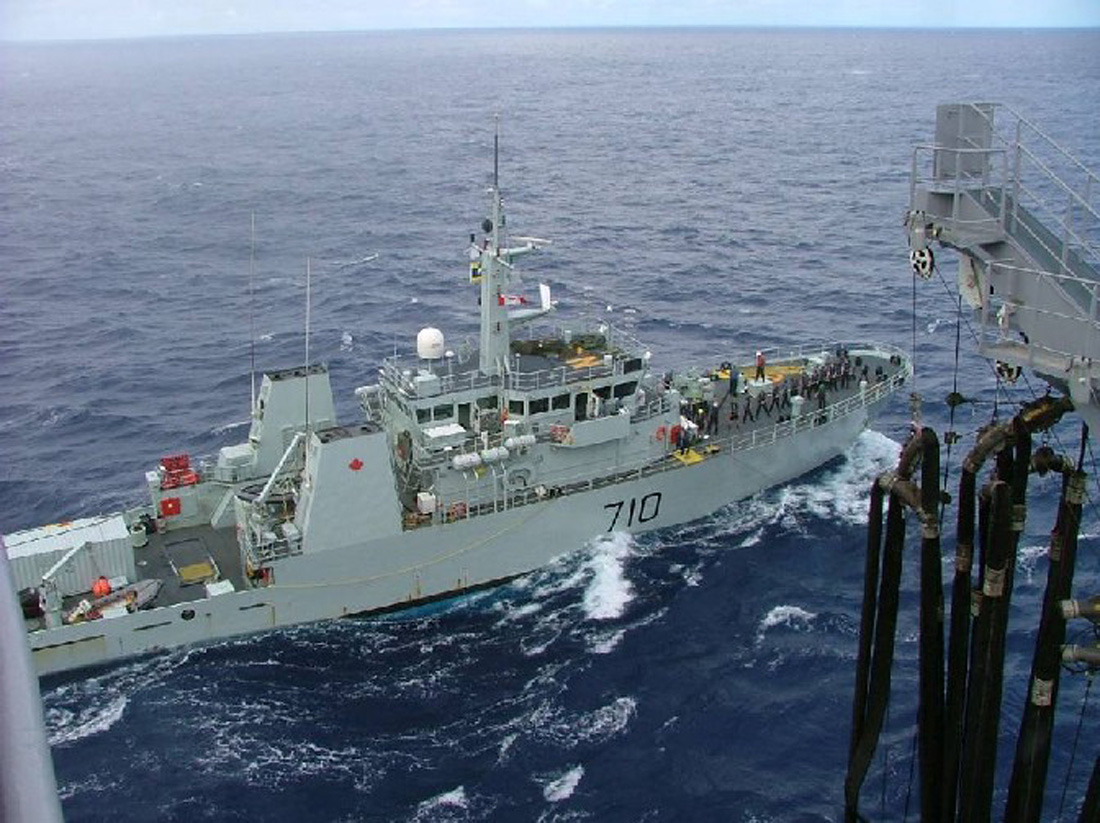
HMCS Brandon, Kingston-class maritime coastal defence vessel, conducting mine-sweeping operations in 2004.

== Organization ==
=== Naval Reserve Headquarters ===
Located in Quebec City at the Pointe-à-Carcy Naval Complex, Naval Reserve Headquarters (NAVRESHQ) oversees the operation of all 24 NRDs across Canada. Co-located with NAVRESHQ is NRD HMCS Montcalm, Naval Fleet School (Quebec) (NFS(Q)) and the Naval Museum of Quebec - Stanislas-Déry Naval Museum.

=== Naval Reserve divisions ===
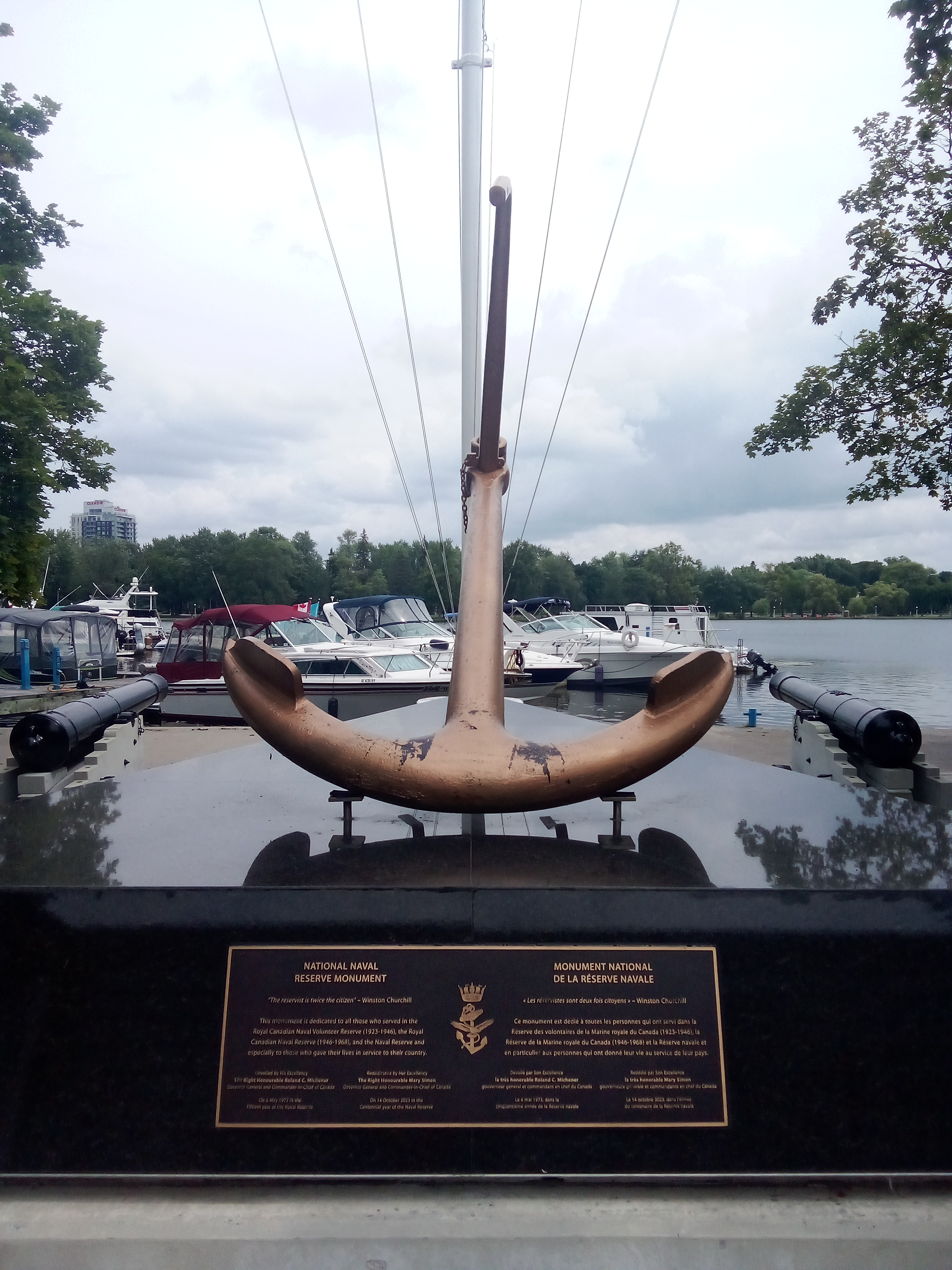
The National Naval Reserve Monument in front of HMCS Carleton in Ottawa, Ontario

Organized into 24 shore-based NRDs, Naval Reserve units are dedicated to training sailors to augment the Regular Force as well as functioning as local recruitment centres for the RCN and NAVRES. Staffed by a small cadre of full-time reservists and Regular Force members to coordinate training and administration, operations at NRDs and dependent units are conducted year-round with reservists frequently deploying on operations and training courses during the summer season.

Naval Reserve divisions (lineage and associated dependent units)
City	Pre-1941	From 1941 to 1966	1967–present
Saint John Moncton - Satellite	Saint John Company [1923] Saint John Half-Company [1927] Saint John Division	HMCS Brunswicker [1941]	HMCS Brunswicker: Moncton Tender (2019)
St John's		HMCS Cabot [1949]	HMCS Cabot
Ottawa	Ottawa Half-Company [1923] Ottawa Division [1935]	HMCS Carleton [1941]: North Bay Tender [1955–1958]	HMCS Carleton
Kingston	Kingston Division [1939]	HMCS Cataraqui [1941]: Naval Air Squadron VC-921 [1953–1964]	HMCS Cataraqui
Chicoutimi			HMCS Champlain [1986]
Winnipeg	Winnipeg Company [1923] Winnipeg Division [1936]	HMCS Chippawa [1941]	HMCS Chippawa
Rimouski		HMCS d'Iberville [1952–1961]	HMCS d'Iberville [1986]
Vancouver	No. 2 (Vancouver) Company [1914] Vancouver Half-Company [1924] Vancouver Division	HMCS Discovery [1941]	HMCS Discovery
Montreal	Montreal (English) Half-Company [1923–1928] Montreal (French) Half-Company [1923–1928] Montreal Company [1928–1934] Montreal Division [1934–1940] Cartier Division [1939–1940] (Note: Established as a Francophone division, she was amalgamated with HMCS Donnacona in 1945.)	HMCS Montreal [1941–1943] HMCS Donnacona [1943] HMCS Cartier [1941–1945]	HMCS Donnacona
Thunder Bay	Port Arthur Half-Company [1937]	HMCS Griffon [1941]	HMCS Griffon
Windsor	Windsor Half-Company (1940)	HMCS Hunter [1941]	HMCS Hunter
Sept-Îles			HMCS Jolliet [1989]
Victoria	No. 1 Half-Company [1914–1918]	HMCS Malahat [1944]: Naval Air Squadron VC-922 [1953–1964]	HMCS Malahat
Quebec City	Quebec Half-Company Quebec Division	HMCS Montcalm [1941]: Naval Air Squadron VC-923 [1954–1964]	HMCS Montcalm
Edmonton	Edmonton Half-Company [1927] Edmonton Division	HMCS Nonsuch [1941–1964]	HMCS Nonsuch [1975]
London	London Division [1938]	HMCS Prevost [1941–1964]	HMCS Prevost [1990]
Regina	Regina Half-Company [1923] Regina Division	HMCS Queen [1941–1964]	HMCS Queen [1975]
Charlottetown	Charlottetown Half-Company [1923] Charlottetown Division	HMCS Queen Charlotte [1941–1964]	HMCS Queen Charlotte [1994]
Trois-Rivières			HMCS Radisson [1987]
Halifax	Halifax Half-Company [1925] Halifax Division	HMCS Haligonian [1943–1946] HMCS Scotian [1947]	HMCS Scotian
Hamilton		HMCS Patriot [1956–1966] (Note: Headquarters for the Commanding Officer Naval Divisions co-located with Great Lakes Training Centre.)	
Hamilton	Hamilton Volunteer Naval Company [1862] Hamilton Naval Brigade [1866] Hamilton Naval Company [1868] Hamilton Half-Company [1923] Hamilton Division	HMCS Star [1941]: Kitchener Tender [1954–1964]	HMCS Star: Kitchener Tender [2019]
Calgary	Calgary Half-Company [1923] Calgary Division [1935]	HMCS Tecumseh [1941]: Naval Air Squadron VC-924 [1954–1964]	HMCS Tecumseh
Saskatoon	Saskatoon Half-Company [1923]	HMCS Unicorn [1941]	HMCS Unicorn
Toronto	Toronto Naval Company [1868] Toronto Company [1923] Toronto Company	HMCS York [1941]: Naval Air Squadron VC-920 [1953–1964]	HMCS York
Corner Brook		HMCS Caribou [1953-1958]	
Prince Rupert		HMCS Chatham [1942-1964]	

=== Naval Security Team ===
The Naval Security Team (NST) is a modular, scalable, flexible, and deployable naval team primarily composed of naval reservists, with Regular Force members rounding out the team when required. Tasked with providing enhanced force protection and security of deployed RCN ships and personnel at home or overseas, the NST deployed for the first time in 2017 providing force protection for HMCS Winnipeg during her port visit to Busan, South Korea. Headquartered at Canadian Forces Base (CFB) Esquimalt the NST reports directly to the Commander Canadian Fleet Pacific

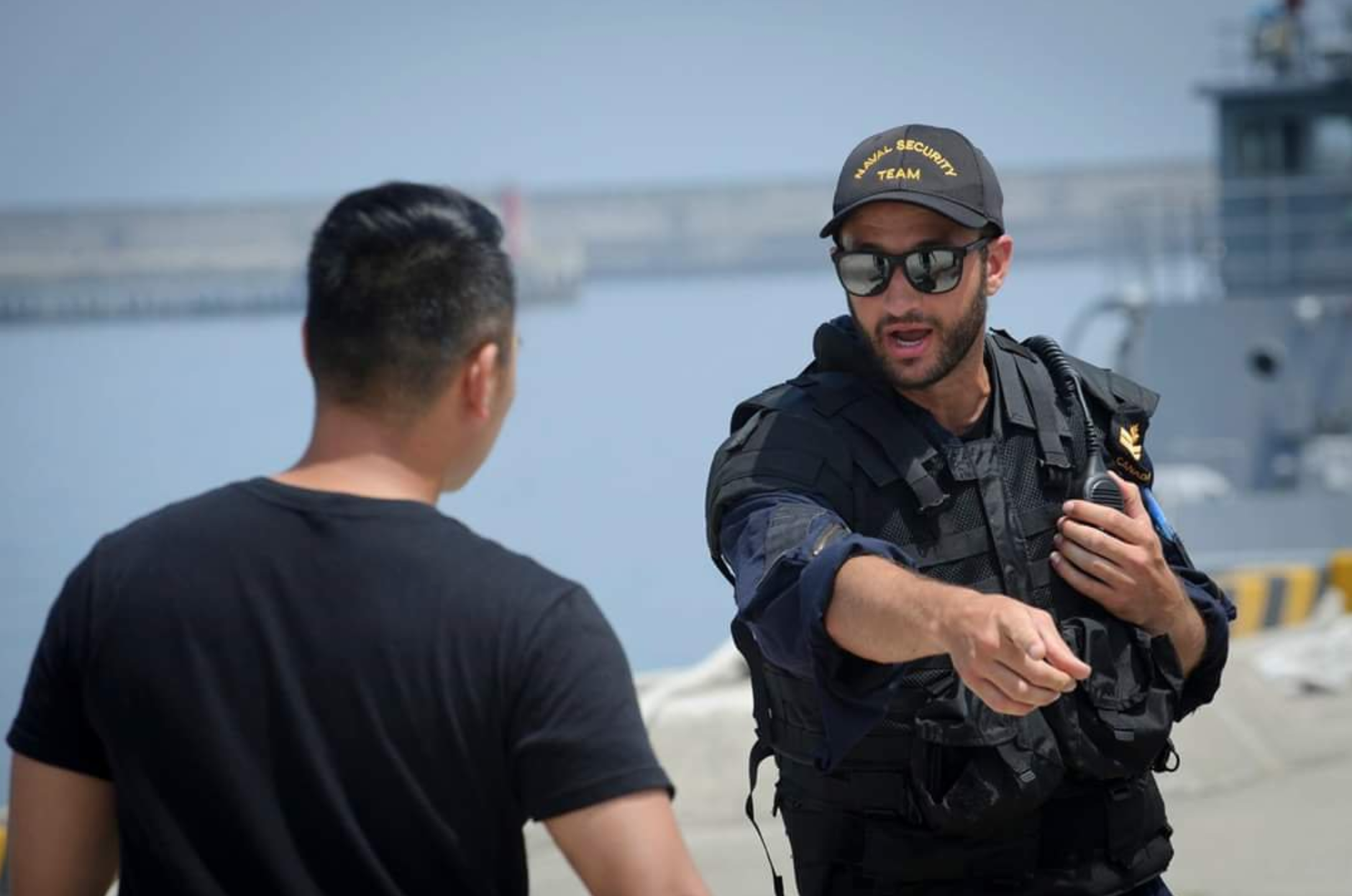
A naval reservist from HMCS Star in Hamilton, Ontario, directs another member during NST workup training prior to deploying to Korea in 2017.

=== National Band of the Naval Reserve ===
Each summer, musicians from the five NRDs come together to form the National Band of the Naval Reserve (NBNR). During the summer months the NBNR is a full-time touring military band composed of musicians from HMCS Chippawa, Donnacona, Montcalm, Star, Tecumseh and York.

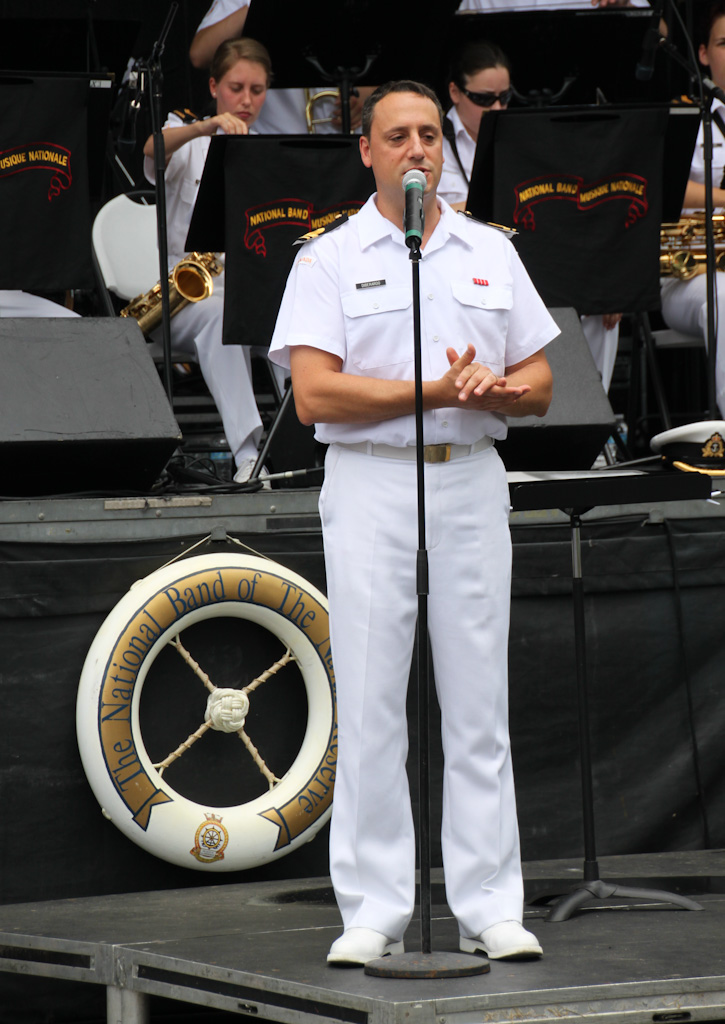
Member of the NBNR speaking at a community event in 2011

== Equipment ==
As of 2019, naval reserve divisions (NRDs) across Canada primarily operate various types of inboard and outboard rigid-hull inflatable boats in addition to Defender-class boats operated by the NST. Most particularly, NAVRES is tasked with providing the personnel for the Kingston-class coastal defence vessels and Naval Security Team (NST).

== Personnel ==
Naval reservists are individuals who are otherwise engaged in civilian careers while pursuing a military career in the CAF with NAVRES as an officer or non-commissioned member. They train and work for the Navy in the evenings, on weekends and during the summer period, in an occupation of their choice. They can be students, teachers, lawyers, delivery persons, secretaries, or other members of society. Most serve on a part-time basis, with no obligation to participate in any mission overseas. However, many full-time employment opportunities and deployments are available to those reservists who volunteer for them.

Throughout their career, sailors may serve in three classes of service:

- Class A (part-time);
- Class B (full-time non-operational); or
- Class C (full-time operational).

=== Training ===
Reserve Force members are trained to the same level as their Regular Force counterparts. They usually begin training with their home unit to ensure that they meet the required basic professional military standards, followed by basic training at Camp Vimy at CFB Valcartier, Quebec.

Naval Fleet School (Quebec) (NFS(Q)) is the RCN's school dedicated to training reservists at various points of their careers and serving as the CAF centre of excellence for coastal and littoral warfare training. For at sea training, the Orca-class patrol vessels are primarily used to facilitate numerous one-to-six-week long at-sea training evolutions for training for reserve sailors. A class of eight steel-hulled training and surveillance vessels, the Orca-class patrol vessels are located at Patrol Craft Training Unit Canadian Forces Base (CFB) Esquimalt.

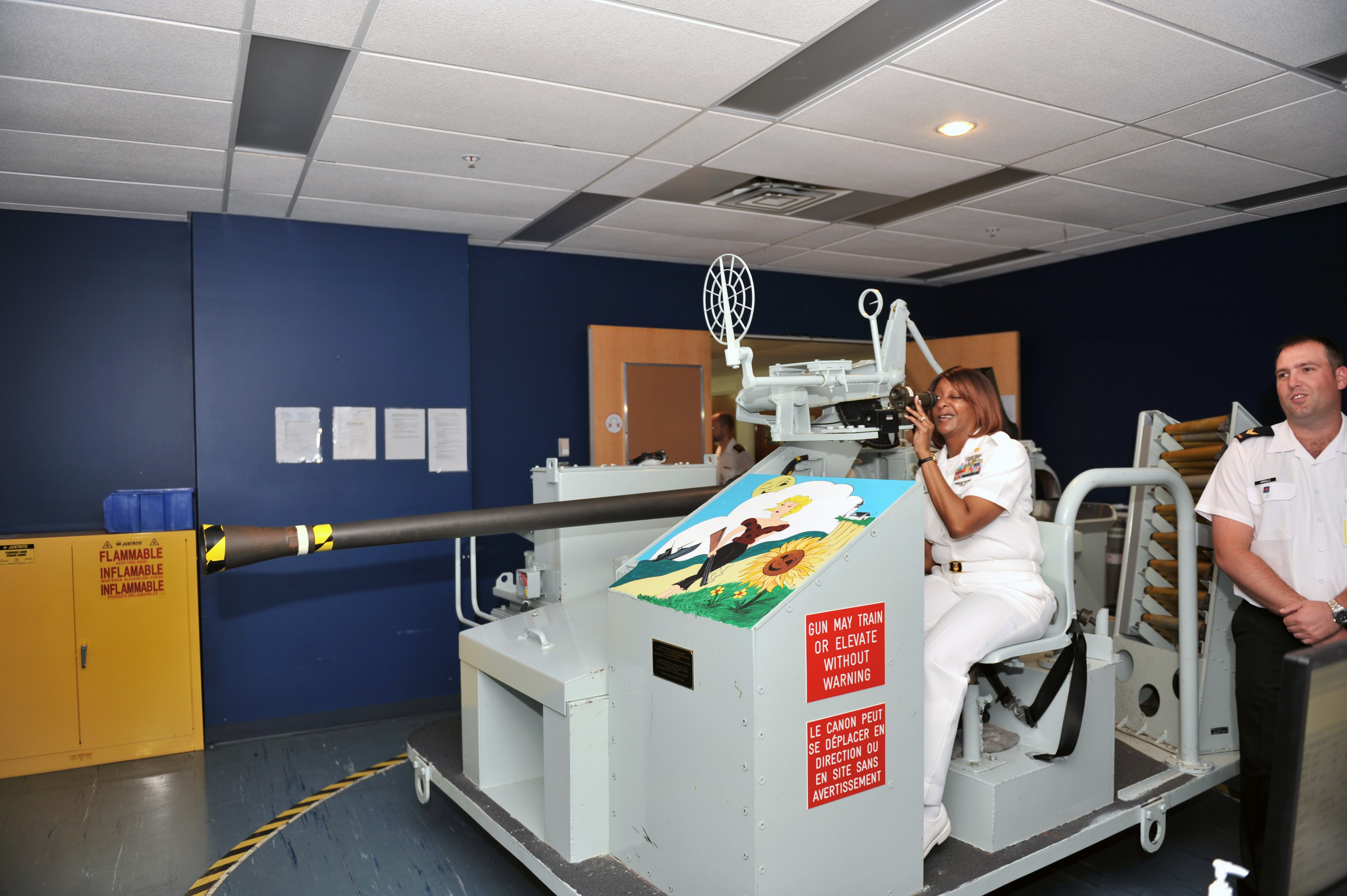
US Master Chief Dee Allen, command master chief of Carrier Strike Group 2, operates a 40 mm Bofors gun at NFS(Q) small arms trainer in 2012.

=== Naval Reserve occupations ===
The Canadian Armed Forces lists 36 occupations that are performed by either officer or non-commissioned members of the Naval Reserve. Many occupations—such as intelligence officer— are common across all three environments, while others—such as naval communicator—are specifically Navy. As of October 2020, the following occupations are listed as Naval Reserve occupations:

1. Anesthesiologist (Medical Specialist)
2. Biomedical Electronics Technologist
3. Boatswain
4. Chaplain
5. Communicator Research Operator
6. Cook
7. Financial Services Administrator
8. General Surgeon (Medical Specialist)
9. Health Care Administration Officer
10. Human Resources Administrator
11. Imagery Technician
12. Intelligence Officer
13. Intelligence Operator
14. Internal Medicine Specialist (Medical Specialist)
15. Legal Officer
16. Logistics Officer
17. Marine Technician
18. Materiel Management Technician
19. Medical Officer
20. Medical Technician
21. Military Police
22. Military Police Officer
23. Musician
24. Naval Combat Information Operator
25. Naval Communicator
26. Naval Warfare Officer
27. Nursing Officer
28. Orthopedic Surgeon (Medical Specialist)
29. Personnel Selection Officer
30. Pharmacy Officer
31. Physician Assistant
32. Physiotherapy Officer
33. Port Inspection Diver
34. Public Affairs Officer
35. Radiologist (Medical Specialist)
36. Training Development Officer

=== Pay ===
Naval reservists are paid 92.8% of Regular Force rates of pay, receive a reasonable benefits package and may qualify to contribute to a pension plan. In an effort to streamline the recruiting processes for naval reservists, in February 2017 NAVRES initiated the Expedited Reserve Enrolment to allow applicants who meet security, medical, and basic fitness standards to enroll in as few as 21 days or between two and three visits after initial contact with NRD recruiters.

== Senior commanders ==
Through the Commander of the Naval Reserve, Commander Maritime Forces Pacific is the functional authority responsible for the organization and management of the Naval Reserve.

Commander Naval Reserve
- Commodore Beth Vallis (2025-present)
- Commodore Patrick J. Montgomery (2021-2025)
- Commodore Michael Hopper (2018–2021)
- Commodore Marta Mulkins (2015–2018)
- Commodore David W. Craig (2011–2015)
- Commodore Jennifer Bennett (2007–2011)
- Commodore Bob Blakely (2004–2007)
- Commodore W.F. O'Connell (2000–2004)
- Commodore [Raymond A. Zuliani] (1997–2000)
- Commodore R. Beauniet (1995–1997)
- Commodore Jean-Claude Michaud (1993–1995)
Senior Naval Reserve Adviser
- Commodore Jean-Claud Michaud (1992–1993)
- Commodore Laraine Frances Orthlieb (1989–1992)
- Commodore G.L. Peer (1986–1989)
- Commodore Waldron Fox-Decent (1983–1986)
- Commodore T.A.M. Smith (1977–1983)
- Commodore R.T. Bennett (1974–1977)
- Commodore D.R. Learoyd (1971–1974)
- Commodore B.S.C. Oland (1967–1971)
Commanding Officer Naval Division (Regular Force Officers)
- Commodore G.C. Edwards (1965–1966)
- Commodore P.D. Taylor (1960–1965)
- Commodore E.W. Finch-Noyes (1958–1960)
- Rear-Admiral K.F. Adams (1955–1958)
- Commodore K.F. Adams (1953–1955)
Chief Staff Officer Reserves
- Captain (naval) P.W. Earl (1945)
- Captain (naval) P.B. Cross (1944–1945)
Commanding Officer Reserve/Naval Divisions
- Commodore, Second Class E.R. Brock (1942–1945)
Naval Reserve Chief Petty Officer / Formation Chief Naval Reserve
- Chief Petty Officer 1st Class Robert Campbell (2023-present)
- Chief Petty Officer 1st Class Todd Kelly (2020–2023)
- Chief Petty Officer 1st Class Michael Giguere (2017–2020)
- Chief Petty Officer 1st Class David Arsenault (2014–2017)
- Chief Petty Officer 1st Class Peter Caza (2012–2014)
- Chief Petty Officer 1st Class Leroy Hearns (2010–2012)
- Chief Petty Officer 1st Class Glynn Munro (2007–2010)
- Chief Petty Officer 1st Class Glenn Woolfrey (2004–2007)
- Chief Petty Officer 1st Class John Redican (2001–2004)

== See also ==
- List of Canadian Forces Naval Reserve divisions
- YAG training vessel
- Rear-Admiral Walter Hose
