= HMCS Radisson =

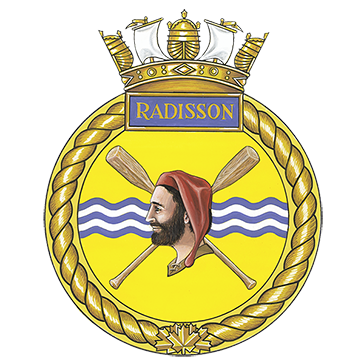
- Badge of HMCS Radisson
- Active: 1986 to present
- Country: Canada
- Allegiance: King of the United Kingdom
- Branch: Royal Canadian Navy
- Type: Stone frigate
- Part of: Canadian Forces Naval Reserve
- Motto(s): Fortitudo In Peseverantia (Latin for 'Preserve with courage')
- Colours: Gold and Blue
- Decorations: 2019-2020 Commodore's Cup for the Best Naval Reserve Unit

Commanders
- Current commander: LCdr Jérémie Bourassa

HMCS Radisson (French: NCSM Radisson) is a Canadian Forces Naval Reserve Division (NRD) located on Île Saint-Christophe in Trois-Rivières, Quebec. Dubbed a stone frigate, HMCS Radisson is a land-based naval training establishment crewed by part-time sailors and also serves as a local recruitment centre for the Canadian Forces Naval Reserve. It is one of 24 naval reserve divisions located in major cities across Canada.

== Namesake ==
HMCS Radisson is named after 17th century explorer Pierre Esprit Radisson who conducted explorations and participated in fur trades using a canoe within the sandy hills of what is now known as Three Rivers (Trois-Rivières). He also co-founded the Hudson's Bay Company.

== History ==
HMCS Radisson was established in 1986 in an effort to expand the presence of the Royal Canadian Navy in Quebec. The NRD was first located at the Trois-Rivières post office and later moved to the former d'Youville School in 1987. In 1992 the unit finally moved to its new facility on Saint-Cristophe Island, where it stands today.
