= HMCS Champlain =

Several Canadian naval units have carried the name HMCS Champlain:

- HMCS Champlain (1919), a S-class destroyer that served in the Royal Canadian Navy from 1928-1936. Formerly HMS Torbay (1919) that served the Royal Navy from 1919-1928.
- HMCS Champlain, a Canadian Forces Naval Reserve division based in Chicoutimi, Quebec since its activation in 1985.
