= Royal Naval Canadian Volunteer Reserve =

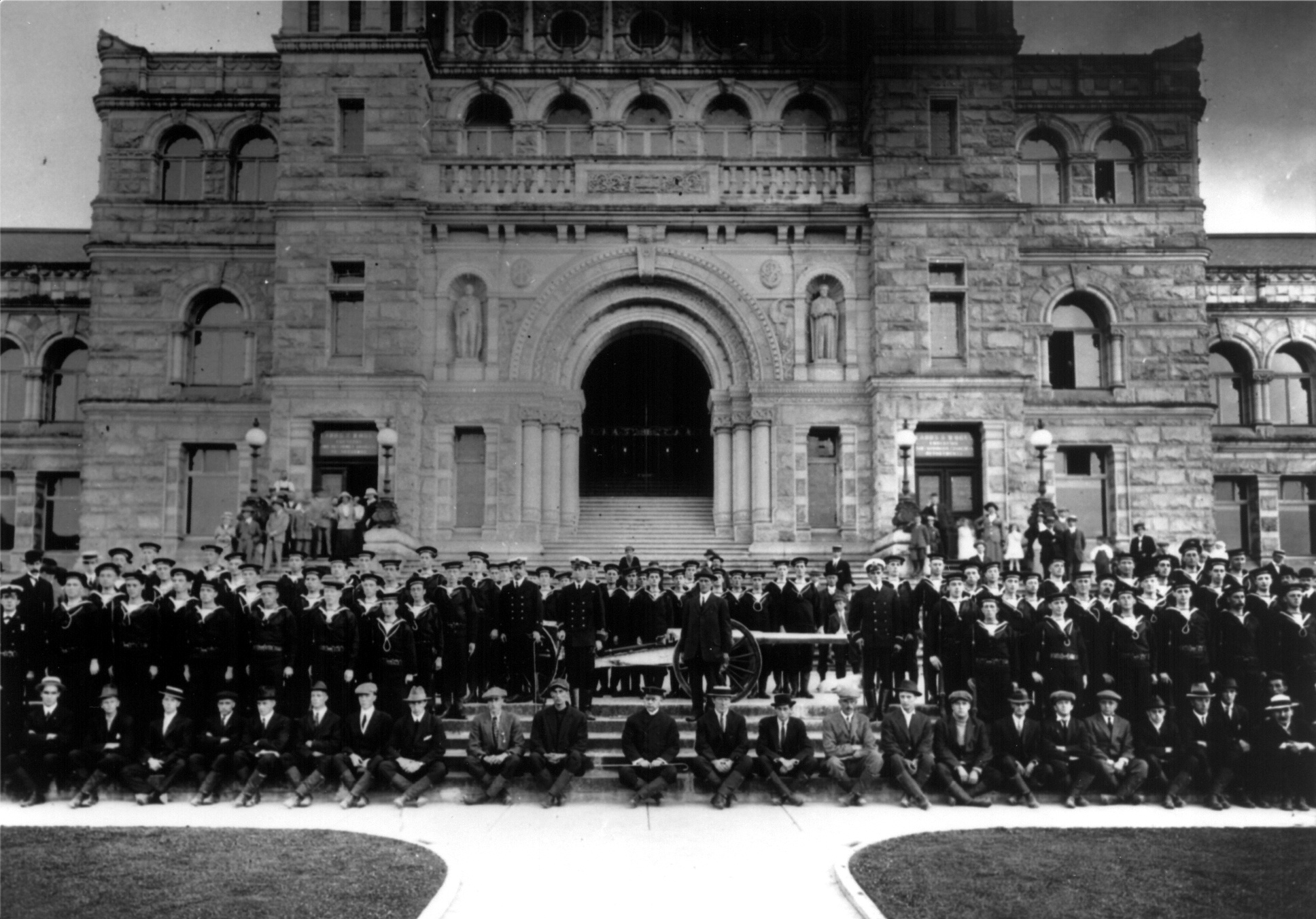
- Personnel of the RNCVR outside the Provincial Legislature, Victoria, British Columbia, 1914.
- Active: 1914–1923
- Country: Canada
- Type: Military reserve force
- Role: Naval
- Part of: Royal Naval Reserve
- Garrison/HQ: Victoria, British Columbia – No. 1 Half Company; Vancouver, British Columbia – No 2 (Vancouver) Company

The Royal Naval Canadian Volunteer Reserve (RNCVR) was a naval reserve that was established in Canada in May 1914 and existed until 1923. Initially divided into three subdivisions stretching across the nation, the RNCVR could serve either with the Royal Canadian Navy or the Royal Navy during wartime. During the First World War, an Overseas Division was created and by the end of the war, over 8,000 men served either in Canadian service or abroad. Following the war, the reservists were demobilized and Canada's volunteer reserve was reorganized into the Royal Canadian Naval Volunteer Reserve.

== Origins ==
In 1910, Canada created the Royal Canadian Navy with the Naval Service Act. The act also authorized the creation of a naval reserve and a naval volunteer force. On 14 May 1914, under the provisions of the Naval Service Act, the RNCVR was established with an initial authorized strength 1,200 of officers and ratings. The men who enrolled as volunteers, agreed to serve in wartime, either with the Royal Canadian Navy or the British Royal Navy. The service was to be patterned on the Royal Navy Reserve, with volunteers drawn from seasoned seafarers. As initially created, the RNCVR consisted of three geographic commands, or subdivisions:

- Atlantic (from the Atlantic coast to a line just west of Quebec City)
- Lake (from the line just west of Quebec City to west of Brandon, Manitoba)
- Pacific (from west of Brandon to the Pacific coast)

Within each subdivision, companies of 100 men would be formed, initially to be organized in the larger cities and then in smaller locales. The decision to create the RNCVR was criticized by the Opposition in the House of Commons, with some claiming that it was a pipeline for strengthening the British Royal Navy rather than Canada's service. The RNCVR program was estimated to cost $200,000. However, any effort to create the companies was left to interested individuals and no active recruitment to the RNCVR was performed by the Royal Canadian Navy in the beginning.

=== Training ===
Volunteers enrolled for three-year terms and could renew their terms for additional three-year periods up to the age of 45. Volunteers trained for 21 days per year or the equivalent in field drills. The British Admiralty provided instructional officers for training in seamanship, company and field drill, torpedo and electrical instruction, engineer and stokehold work, signaling, wireless telegraphy and first aid. Those volunteers who were seamen or fisherman in their civilian careers were to receive training at sea, while those who lived near to the sea would do some of their training at sea and those who lived inland would receive their training at their company's headquarters.

== First World War ==
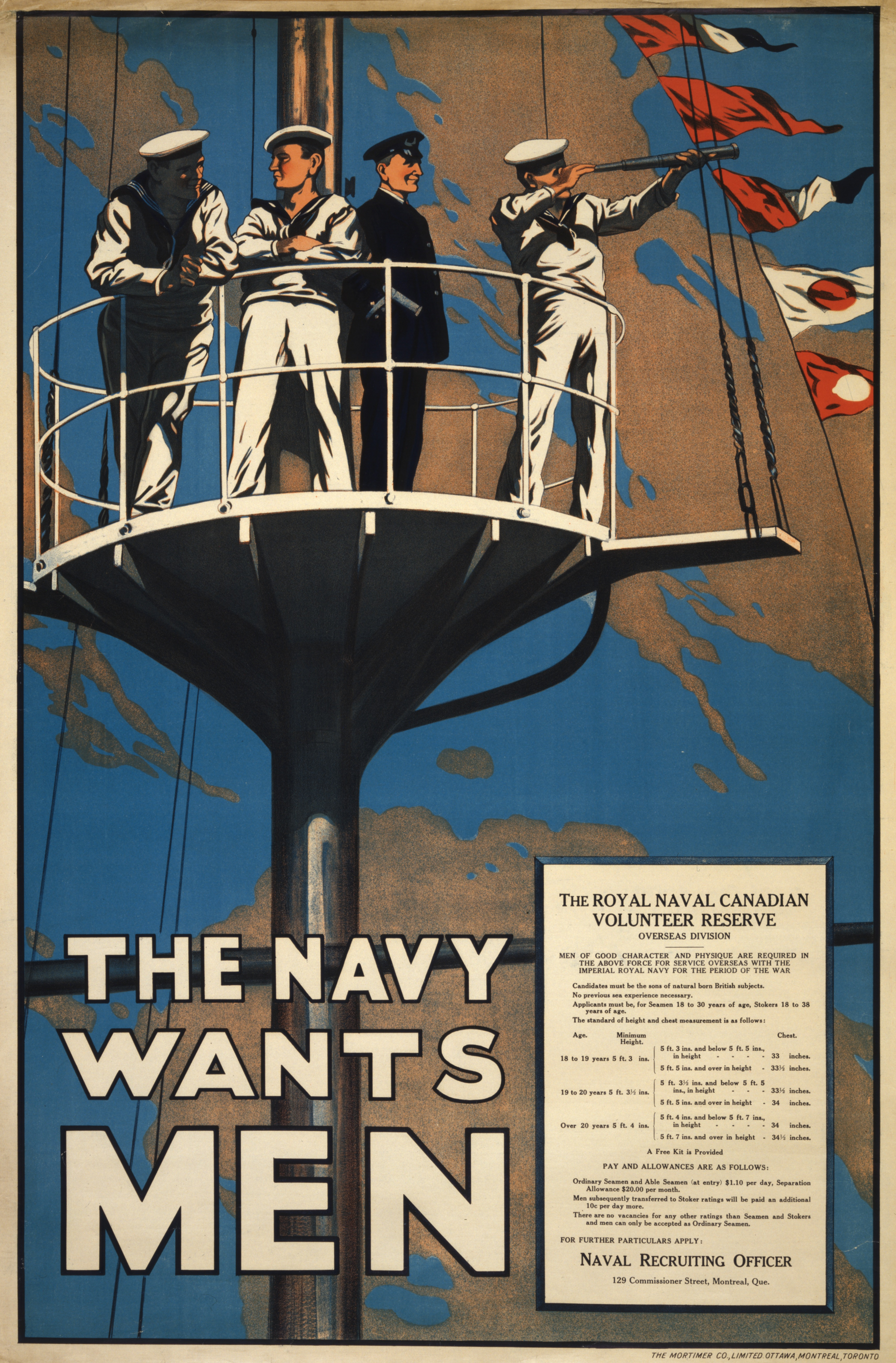
Recruiting poster from 1915

During the First World War, members of the RNCVR saw immediate service with the Royal Canadian Navy, as members of the Victoria, British Columbia company, which was the only operational naval reserve company in the country at the time, were recalled to fill out the crew of the Canadian cruiser HMCS Rainbow. The cruiser deployed south off the western coast of North America, responding to reports of German raiders operating along it. Though Rainbow never interacted with the German raiders, Rainbow did capture two German merchant vessels as war prizes. The Victoria company went on to fill out the crews of the submarines CC-1 and CC-2 and their tender Shearwater soon after the war began.

As volunteer numbers grew, an Overseas Division was created in February 1916 to recruit Canadians for service with the Royal Navy. Recruiting for this division was divided into nine districts, headquartered in the provincial capitals except in British Columbia, where the headquarters was in Vancouver. By early 1917, roughly 1,200 men had been shipped to the United Kingdom. Though 5,000 men had been authorized, by the end of the war, only 1,700 volunteers were enrolled into the Overseas Division, a number that was limited after the East Coast Patrol along Canada's Atlantic Coast became the focal point of the Canadian naval reserve.

During the war, 8,000 officers and ratings joined the RNCVR for service at home or overseas, including those in the Overseas Division. The RNCVR crewed 160 vessels, mainly patrol vessels protecting the shores around Canada and convoy escort duty.

== Demise ==
The RNCVR quickly rose to prominence during the war, but, along with the Royal Canadian Navy, was neglected after the war drew to a close in 1918. Reservists were demobilized, and the organization of the RNCVR was allowed to lapse due to cuts to the Royal Canadian Navy's budget. By 1922, debates in the House of Commons proposed to rework Canada's naval reserve. The reserve would be reworked into a militia model and would train two to three times a year, supplementing the much smaller regular force on the coasts. This new reserve force replaced the RNCVR, being renamed the Royal Canadian Naval Volunteer Reserve in 1923.

== See also ==
- Royal Canadian Navy (Reserve) 1946–1968
- Canadian Forces Naval Reserve 1968–present

== Sources ==
- Gimblett, Richard H., ed. (2009). The Naval Service of Canada 1910–2010: The Centennial Story. Toronto: Dundurn Press. ISBN 978-1-55488-470-4.
- Gimblett, Richard H.; Hadley, Michael L., eds. (2010). Citizen Sailors: Chronicles of Canada's Naval Reserve. Toronto: Dundurn Press. ISBN 978-1-55488-867-2.
- Tucker, Gilbert Norman (1962). The Naval Service of Canada, Its Official History – Volume 1: Origins and Early Years. Ottawa: King's Printer. OCLC 840569671 – via Government of Canada – Military History.
