= HMAV =

HMAV can refer to:

- Mildef Tarantula HMAV, Malaysian MRAP

== Nautical ==
HMAV is a ship prefix used for certain British military ships. It can stand for:

- His (or Her) Majesty's Army Vessel, the current meaning
- His (or Her) Majesty's Armed Vessel, prior to the 20th Century
