= USCGC Amberjack =

United States Coast Guard patrol boat

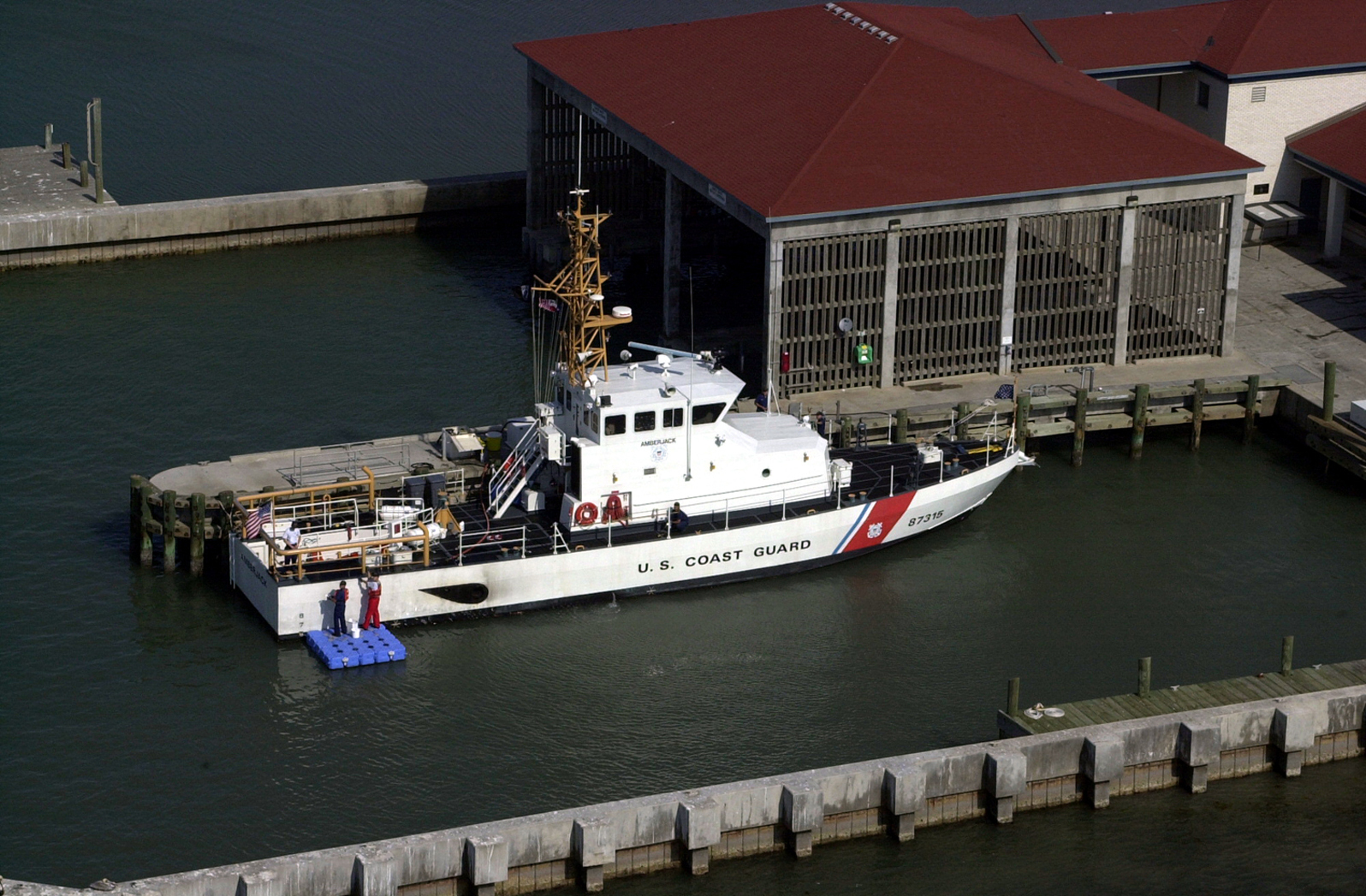
- Amberjack at Coast Guard Station South Padre Island, February 2001

History

United States
- Name: Amberjack
- Namesake: Amberjack
- Operator: United States Coast Guard
- Builder: Bollinger Shipyards, Lockport, Louisiana
- Home port: Coast Guard Station South Padre Island, Port Isabel, Texas
- Identification: Hull number: WPB-87315
- Status: In active service

General characteristics
- Class & type: Marine Protector-class patrol boat
- Length: 87 ft (27 m)

USCGC Amberjack (WPB-87315) is an 87-foot (27 m) Marine Protector-class of the United States Coast Guard, based at Coast Guard Station South Padre Island near Port Isabel, Texas, at the southern tip of the Texas coast. It patrols the Gulf of Mexico near the maritime border with Mexico, where its crew intercepts Mexican fishing boats, known as lanchas, fishing illegally in U.S. waters. In April 2021 it took part in the search after the lift boat Seacor Power capsized off Louisiana.

== Design ==
Amberjack is one of the Marine Protector-class coastal patrol boats built for the Coast Guard by Bollinger Shipyards of Lockport, Louisiana, under a contract first awarded on March 13, 1996. The class replaced the older 82-foot Point-class cutters.

== Service history ==
At about 7 p.m. on January 24, 2015, its crew sighted a lancha heading north in U.S. waters. Coast Guard Sector Corpus Christi sent a boat from Station South Padre Island and a helicopter from Air Station Corpus Christi. With the helicopter providing cover, Amberjack guided the station's boat to the lancha, which was stopped about 50 miles (80 km) north of the maritime border with four people and fishing gear aboard. Amberjack towed the lancha back to Station South Padre Island, and the four people and the seized gear were turned over to U.S. Customs and Border Protection.

On April 13, 2021, the lift boat Seacor Power capsized south of Port Fourchon, Louisiana. Amberjack joined a large search for its crew alongside the fast response cutters Glen Harris and Benjamin Dailey and the patrol boat Moray. On April 14 Amberjack's crew recovered one unresponsive person from the water.

== See also ==
- List of United States Coast Guard cutters
