= His Majesty's Ship =

Ship prefix used in the United Kingdom and some other monarchies

His (or Her) Majesty's Ship, abbreviated HMS and H.M.S., is the ship prefix used for ships of the navy in some monarchies. Derivative terms such as HMAS and equivalents in other languages such as SMS are used.

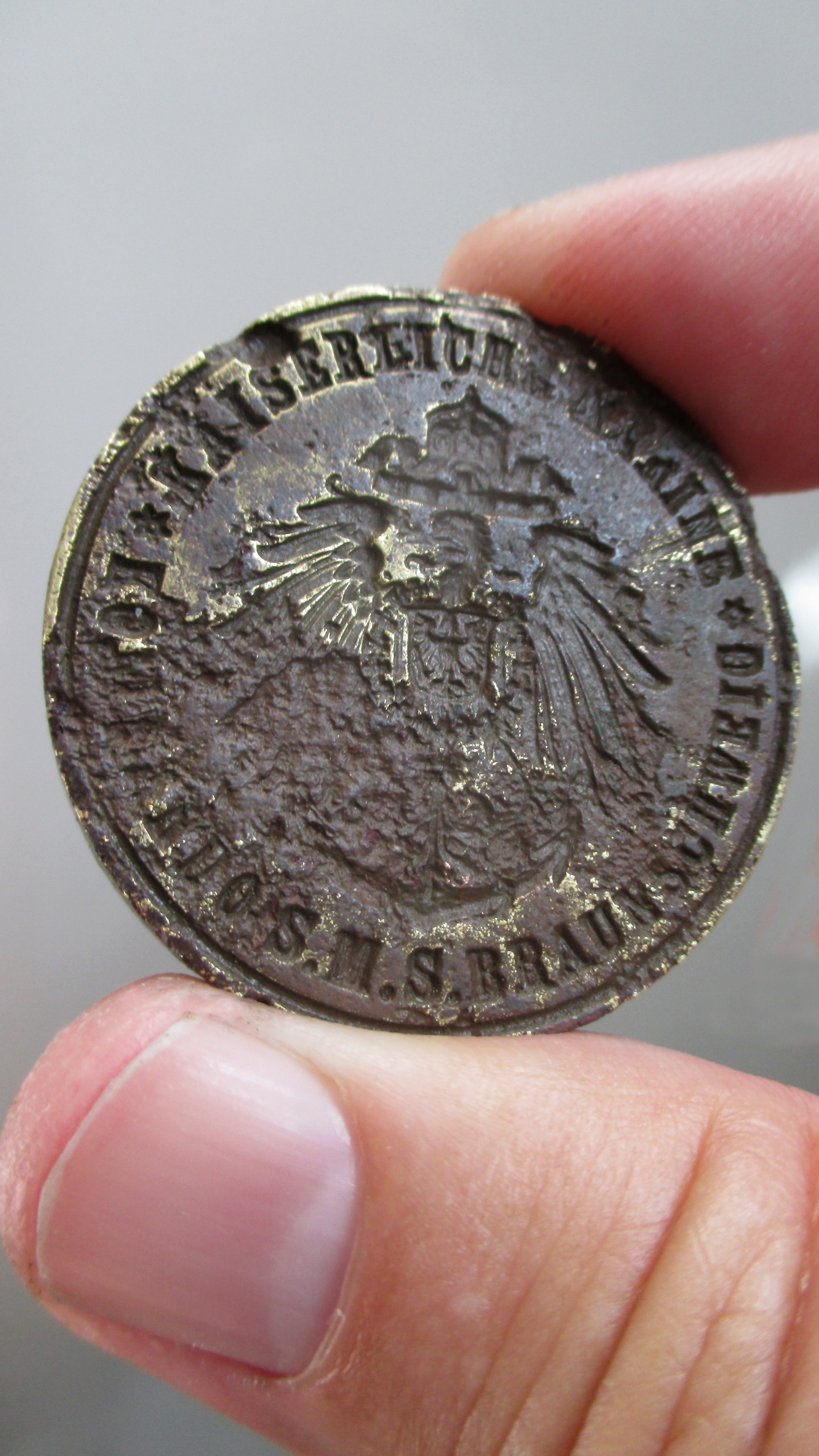
Seal of the Imperial German Navy (1871–1919) – (Mirrored) – Kommando S.M.S. Braunschweig

== Commonwealth Realms ==
=== United Kingdom ===
With regard to the separate English and Scottish navies of the medieval period and early modern era, historians usually use terms such as "English Ship" or "Scottish Ship".

During the late 17th century, following the Restoration, the name Royal Navy was officially adopted, as well as the prefix His Majesty's Ship, and later, Her Majesty's Ship. The first recorded use of the abbreviated form HMS was in 1789, in respect of HMS Phoenix. From 1707 to circa 1800 HBMS (for His Britannic Majesty's Ship) was also used. Submarines in His Majesty's service also use the prefix HMS, standing for His Majesty's Submarine, though this is sometimes rendered HMS/m. (See, for example, HMS/m Tireless, at IWM). The Royal Yacht Britannia, which was a commissioned ship in the Royal Navy, was known as HMY Britannia. Otherwise all ships in the Royal Navy are known as HM Ships, though formerly when a distinction was made between three-masted ship-rigged ships and smaller vessels they would be called HM Frigate X, or HM Sloop Y.

The prefix HMS is also used by shore establishments that are commissioned "stone frigates" in the Royal Navy. Examples include HMS Excellent, a training school located on an island in Portsmouth Harbour, and HMS Vulcan, in Caithness in the Highland area of Scotland, which is established to test the design of nuclear power systems for use in submarines.

The sample ship name used by the Royal Navy to signify a hypothetical vessel is HMS Nonsuch. This is a name that has been used by the Royal Navy in the past; on the eve of World War II the name was given to the Royal Canadian Navy. As of 2012 HMCS Nonsuch was the "stone frigate" of the Edmonton Division of the Canadian Naval Reserve.

Prefixing the name by "the", as in "the HMS Ark Royal", while common, is considered bad grammar.

British government ships not in the Royal Navy have other designations, such as RFA for ships in the Royal Fleet Auxiliary.

=== Use outside the United Kingdom ===
Historically, variants on HMS have been used by the navies of British colonies. The practice is maintained in several Commonwealth realms – states in which the monarch of the UK is head of state – as well as other Commonwealth countries and former members of the British Empire.

==== Current ====
- Canada: His Majesty's Canadian Ship (HMCS) / (French: Navire canadien de Sa Majesté) (NCSM) – Royal Canadian Navy
- Australia: His Majesty's Australian Ship (HMAS) – Royal Australian Navy
- New Zealand: His Majesty's New Zealand Ship (HMNZS) / (Māori: Te Kaipuke o Niu Tireni) (TKNI) – Royal New Zealand Navy
- Bahamas: His Majesty's Bahamian Ship (HMBS) – Royal Bahamas Defence Force
- Papua New Guinea: His Majesty's Papua New Guinean Ship (HMPNGS) – Papua New Guinea Defence Force
- Jamaica: His Majesty's Jamaican Ship (HMJS) – Jamaica Defence Force
- Tuvalu: His Majesty's Tuvalu State Ship (HMTSS)

==== Former ====
- Colonial: Her Majesty's Colonial Ship (HMCS)
- Australia: Commonwealth Naval Ship (CNS)
- Burma: His Majesty's Burmese Ship (HMBS)
- Barbados: Her Majesty's Barbadian Ship (HMBS) – Barbados Defence Force
- South Africa: His Majesty's South African Ship (HMSAS) / (Afrikaans: Sy Majesteit se Suid-Afrikaanse Skip) (SMSA) – South African Navy
- Ceylon: Her Majesty's Ceylon Ship (HMCyS)
- Fiji: Her Majesty's Fijian Ship (HMFS)
- India: His Majesty's Indian Ship (HMIS)
- Queensland (before the federation of Australia): Her Majesty's Queensland Ship (HMQS)
- Victoria (before the federation of Australia): Her Majesty's Victorian Ship (HMVS)
- Pakistan: His Majesty's Pakistan Ship (HMPS)

== Denmark ==
All Danish Navy ships carry the ship prefix KDM (Kongelige Danske Marine) in Danish, but this is translated to HDMS (Her / His Danish Majesty's Ship) in English.

== Germany ==
Seiner Majestät Schiff (pronounced [ˈzaɪnɐ majɛsˈtɛːt ʃɪf]; German for 'His Majesty's Ship'; abbreviated to S.M.S. or SMS) was the ship prefix used by the Prussian Maritime Enterprise (Seehandlung), the Prussian Navy, the Imperial German Navy (Kaiserliche Marine) and the Austro-Hungarian Navy (Kaiserliche und königliche Kriegsmarine). It was created by translating the British prefix into German.

It was sometimes also abbreviated to S.M. or SM (for Seiner Majestät) when a ship was mentioned by class, such as S.M. Kleiner Kreuzer Emden ("His Majesty's Light Cruiser Emden").

Special forms included

- S.M.Y. (or SMY) = Seiner Majestät Yacht ("His Majesty's Yacht") for king's or emperor's yacht
- I.M.Y. = Ihrer Majestät Yacht ("Her Majesty's Yacht") for the queen's or empress's yacht.
- S.M.F. = Seiner Majestät Feuerschiff ("His Majesty's Lightvessel")
- S.M.H. = Seiner Majestät Hilfsschiff ("His Majesty's Auxiliary Ship")
- S.M.W. = Seiner Majestät Werkstattschiff ("His Majesty's Workshop Ship")
- S.M.U. = Seiner Majestät Unterseeboot ("His Majesty's Submarine", prefixing a number not a name)

== Netherlands ==
International prefixes for ships of the Royal Netherlands Navy is HNLMS (His/Her Netherlands Majesty's Ship). The Netherlands navy itself uses the prefixes Zr.Ms. (Zijner Majesteits, His Majesty's) when a king is on the throne, and Hr.Ms. (Harer Majesteits, Her Majesty's) when there is a queen. Changes happen automatically at the beginning of a new monarch's reign.

== Norway ==
The Royal Norwegian Navy vessels have since 1946 been given the ship prefix KNM, short for Kongelig Norske Marine (Royal Norwegian Navy). In English, they are given the prefix HNoMS, short for "His/Her Norwegian Majesty's Ship" (HNMS could be also used for the Royal Netherlands Navy, for which HNLMS is used instead). Coast Guard vessels are given the prefix KV for Kystvakt (Coast Guard) in Norwegian and NoCGV for Norwegian Coast Guard Vessel in English.

== Romania ==
Prior to World War II, the subsequent ousting of the monarchy of Romania on 30 December 1947 and post-war Soviet occupation, all Royal Romanian Navy vessels were given the prefix NMS which stands for Nava Majestății Sale which translates to His/her Majesty's Ship in English.

== Sweden ==
In the Royal Swedish Navy, all vessels are given the prefix HMS (Hans or Hennes Majestäts Skepp, His or Her Majesty's Ship). This is true for both surface and submarine vessels.

Abroad, Swedish navy ships are sometimes given the prefix HSwMS (for His Swedish Majesty's Ship), to avoid confusion with other uses of the HMS prefix.

== Thailand ==
In the Royal Thai Navy, ships with a displacement of 150 tons or more use the prefix เรือหลวง ("Royal Ship"), abbreviated ร.ล. meaning ships belonging to the Thai King. In English, the abbreviation HTMS or H.T.M.S. comes from the word His Thai Majesty's Ship. For the name of the ship, it must be granted by the King.

== Tonga ==
In the Tongan Maritime Force, commissioned ships use the prefix Vaka O Ene Afio, abbreviated "VOEA", meaning "His Majesty's Vessel" in Tongan. The initialism is usually left untranslated in English.

== See also ==
- See ship prefix for a list
- Royal Mail Ship (RMS)
- HM Prison (HMP)
- His Majesty's Young Offender Institution (HMYOI)
- His Majesty's Government (HMG)
- His Majesty's Royal Palace and Fortress of the Tower of London
- United States Ship
