= His Majesty's New Zealand Ship =

Ship prefix

His Majesty's New Zealand Ship (HMNZS; Māori: Te Kaipuke o Niu Tireni) is the ship prefix used to identify warships and shore facilities commissioned into the Royal New Zealand Navy (RNZN).

It derives from "His Majesty's Ship" (HMS) used in the United Kingdom. The British monarch is also equally and separately the New Zealand head of state. Should the monarch be female, the designation changes to "Her" rather than "His" Majesty.

The prefix was officially adopted on 1 October 1941 when King George VI approved an order-in-council to transform the New Zealand Division of the Royal Navy into the newly named Royal New Zealand Navy, shifting all New Zealand vessels to the HMNZS prefix.

== See also ==
- His Majesty's Australian Ship
- His Majesty's Canadian Ship
- List of ships of the Royal New Zealand Navy
