= His Majesty's Canadian Ship =

Designation for Canadian naval ships

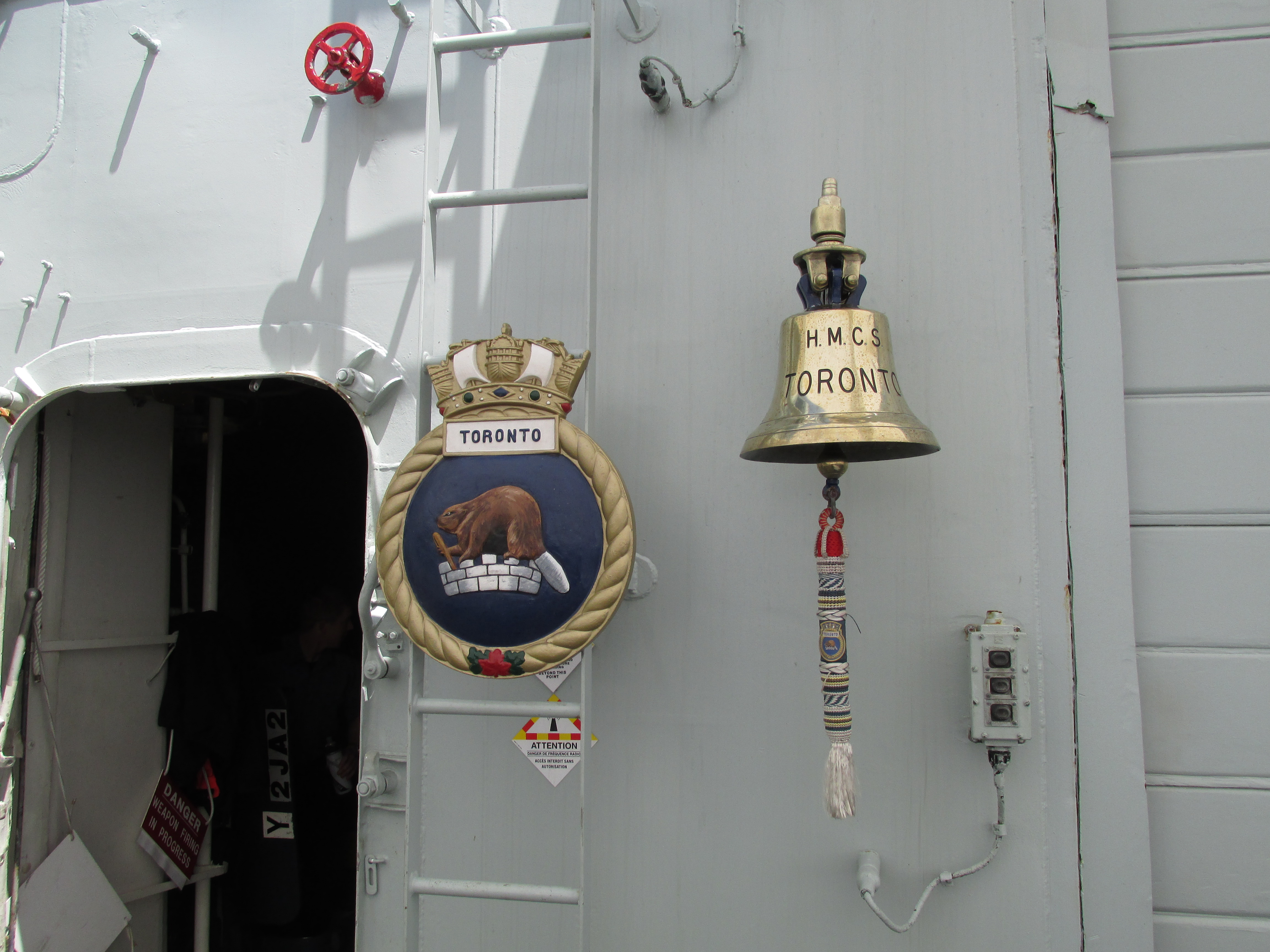
Aboard HMCS Toronto, with its name, HMCS Toronto written on its bell.

The designation His Majesty's Canadian Ship (HMCS; French: Navire canadien de Sa Majesté [NCSM]), is applied as a prefix to surface ships in the Royal Canadian Navy and Canadian Joint Operations Command. The similar designation of His Majesty's Canadian Submarine is applied to submarine vessels.

== Origins of the term ==
The title is derived from His Majesty's Ship (HMS), used in the United Kingdom, as the monarch of Canada is also equally and separately the monarch of the United Kingdom of Great Britain and Northern Ireland.

Various Commonwealth realms use derivative variations to designate their warships, such as His Majesty's Australian Ship (HMAS) and His Majesty's New Zealand Ship (HMNZS).

In the reign of a queen, the designation changes to Her Majesty's Canadian Ship; the French version of the title remains unchanged in this instance. (Note: In English, the possessive pronoun in this phrase takes its gender from the person, and therefore masculine is used during the reign of a king ("his"), feminine during the reign of a queen ("her"). In French, the possessive pronoun takes its gender from the noun being referred to. Since "Majesté" is a feminine noun, the feminine possessive pronoun ("sa") is always used, and does not change with the gender of the monarch.)

== Usage ==
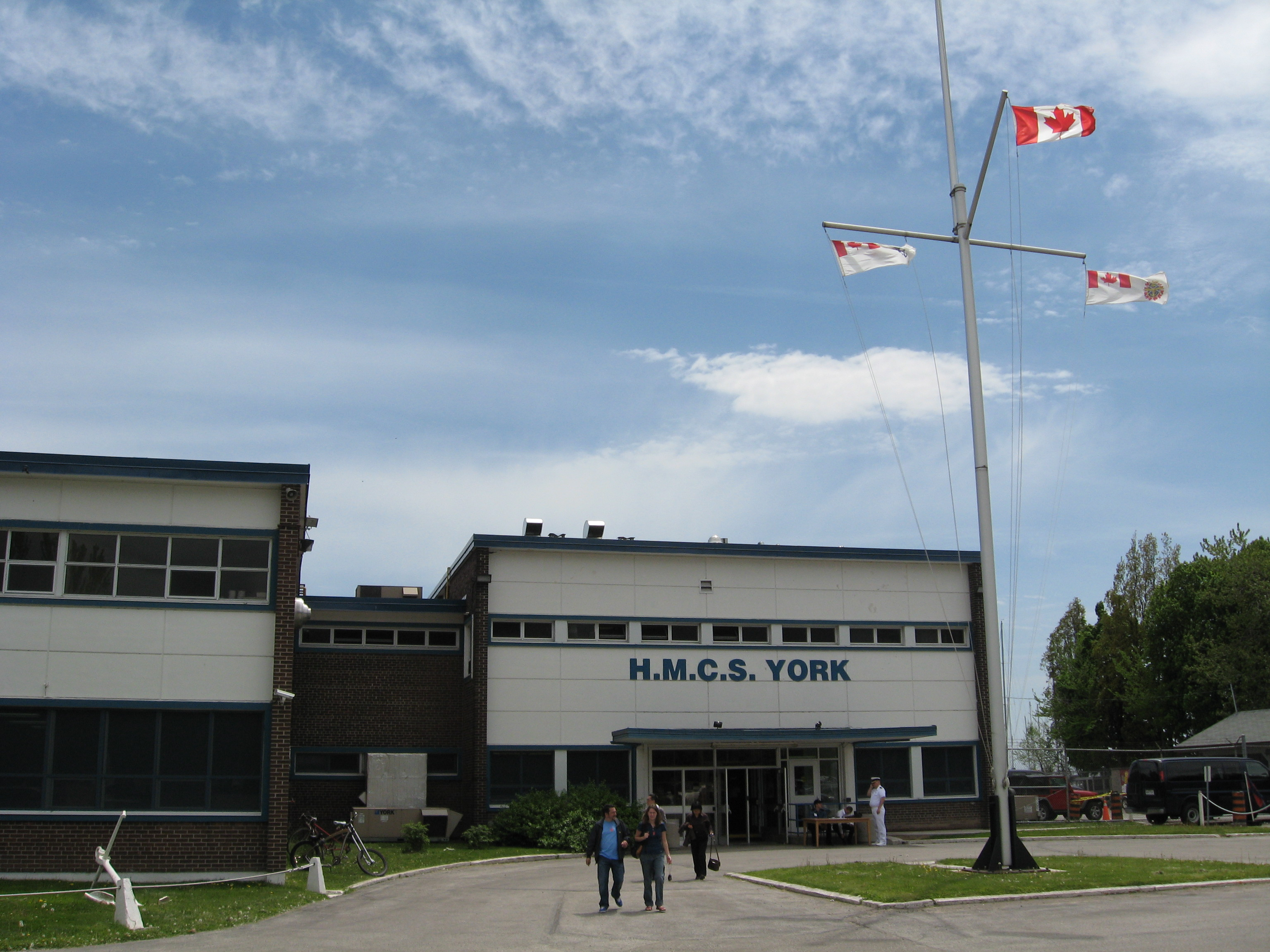
HMCS York is one of several naval shore facilities that bears the designation HMCS.

After the formation of Naval Service of Canada in 1910, warships were given the prefix HMCS with the "C" representing Canadian as a way to differentiate Canadian from British warships. It was initially the only concession the British Admiralty made following the formation of the Canadian naval service. HMCS Rainbow was the first ship with the HMCS designation after being transferred from the British Royal Navy to Canada, commissioned on 4 August 1910. HMCS Haida became the first Canadian ship commissioned under a Queen during March 1952.

Many RCN shore facilities also bear the designation, such as HMCS Trinity, HMCS Chippawa, HMCS Discovery, HMCS Stone Frigate, and the Royal Canadian Sea Cadets summer training centre HMCS Quadra.

Shore maintenance and mooring facilities bear the name His Majesty's Canadian Dockyard (HMC Dockyard) (in French Arsenal canadien de Sa Majesté or Arsenal CSM).

== See also ==
- Hull classification symbol (Canada)
- List of current ships of the Royal Canadian Navy
- Monarchy of Canada and the Canadian Armed Forces
- Stone frigate

== Sources ==
- Johnston, William; Rawling, William G.P.; Gimblett, Richard H.; MacFarlane, John (2010). The Seabound Coast: The Official History of the Royal Canadian Navy, 1867–1939. Vol. 1. Toronto: Dundurn Press. ISBN 978-1-55488-908-2.
- Milner, Marc (2010). Canada's Navy: The First Century (Second ed.). Toronto: University of Toronto Press. ISBN 978-0-8020-9604-3.
