= United States Ship =

Prefix for commissioned warships in the United States Navy

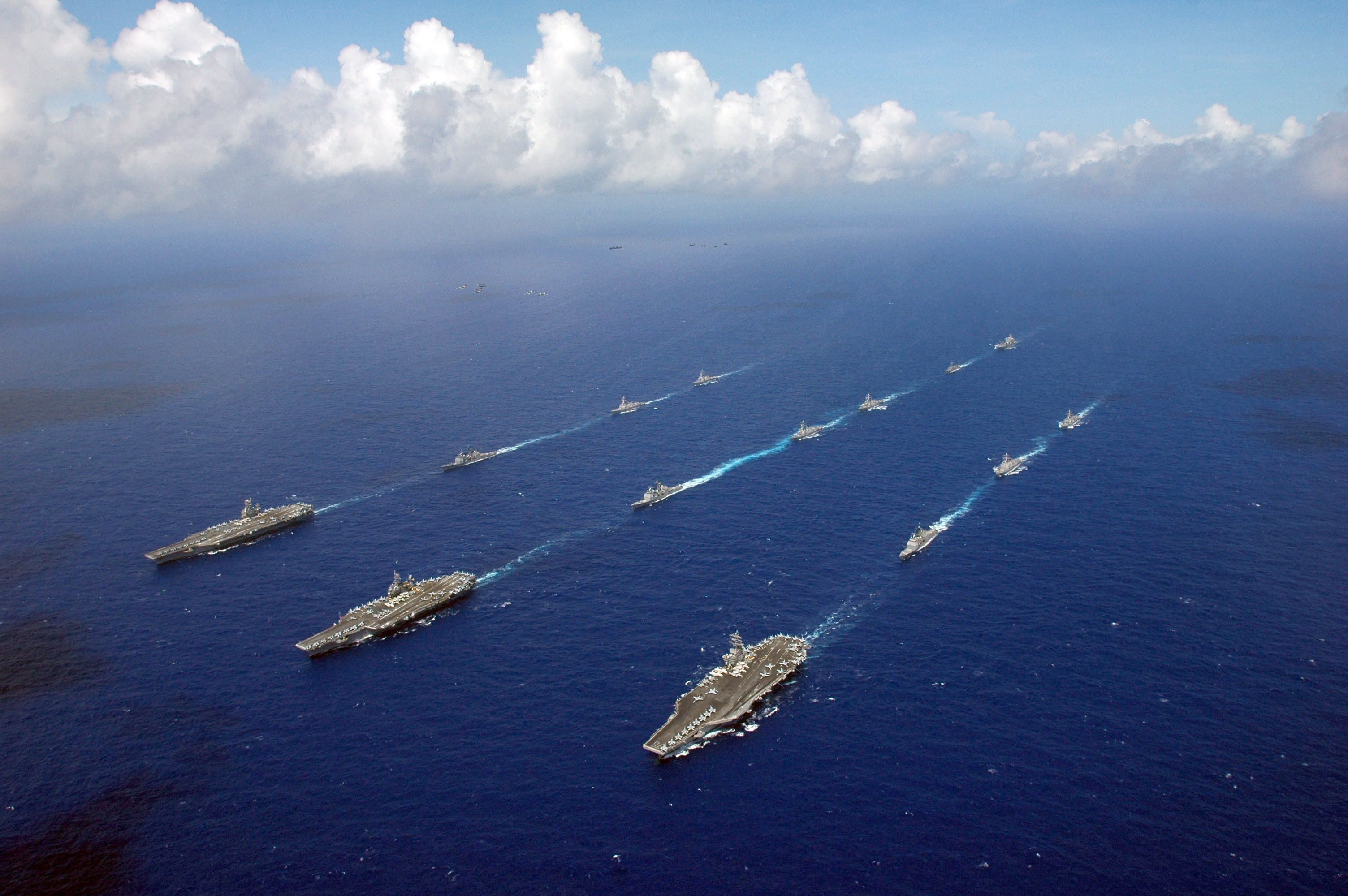
US Navy ships in formation during Exercise Valiant Shield 2006

United States Ship (abbreviated as USS or U.S.S.) is a ship prefix used to identify a commissioned ship of the United States Navy and applies to a ship only while it is in commission. Before commissioning, the vessel may be referred to as a "pre-commissioning unit" (PCU), but is officially referred to by name with no prefix. After decommissioning, it is referred to by name with no prefix, though people commonly refer to those ships with the prefix "ex-", as in ex-ship name. In-service but non-commissioned Navy ships go by the prefix USNS, which stands for United States Naval Ship.

From the early beginnings of the U.S. Navy there had been no standard method of referring to U.S. Navy ships until 1907 when President Theodore Roosevelt issued Executive Order 549 on 8 January stating that all U.S. Navy ships were to be referred to as "The name of such vessel, preceded by the words, United States Ship, or the letters U.S.S., and by no other words or letters".

Article 0406 of United States Navy Regulations (1990) defines the classification and status of naval ships and craft:

1. The Chief of Naval Operations shall be responsible for ... the assignment of classification for administrative purposes to water-borne craft and the designation of status for each ship and service craft.
2. Commissioned vessels and craft shall be called "United States Ship" or "U.S.S."
3. Civilian crewed ships, of the Military Sealift Command or other commands, designated "active status, in service" shall be called "United States Naval Ship" or "U.S.N.S."
4. Ships and service craft designated "active status, in service", except those described by paragraph 3 of this article, shall be referred to by name, when assigned, classification, and hull number (e.g., "HIGH POINT PCH-1" or "YOGN-8").

== See also ==
- List of United States Navy ships
- United States Naval Ship
- United States Navy ships
- His Majesty's Ship
- Hull number
- Japanese ship-naming conventions
