= USCGC Glen Harris =

Sentinel-class cutter of the US Coast Guard

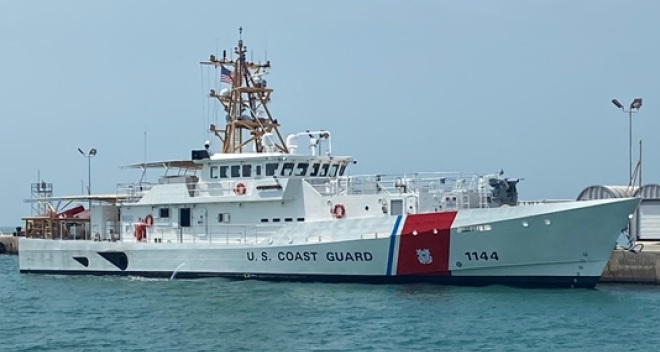

History

United States
- Name: Glen Harris
- Namesake: Glen Harris
- Operator: United States Coast Guard
- Builder: Bollinger Shipyards, Lockport, Louisiana
- Acquired: April 22, 2021
- Commissioned: August 6, 2021
- Home port: Manama, Bahrain
- Identification: Hull number: WPC-1144
- Motto: Gallantry Abroad
- Status: in active service
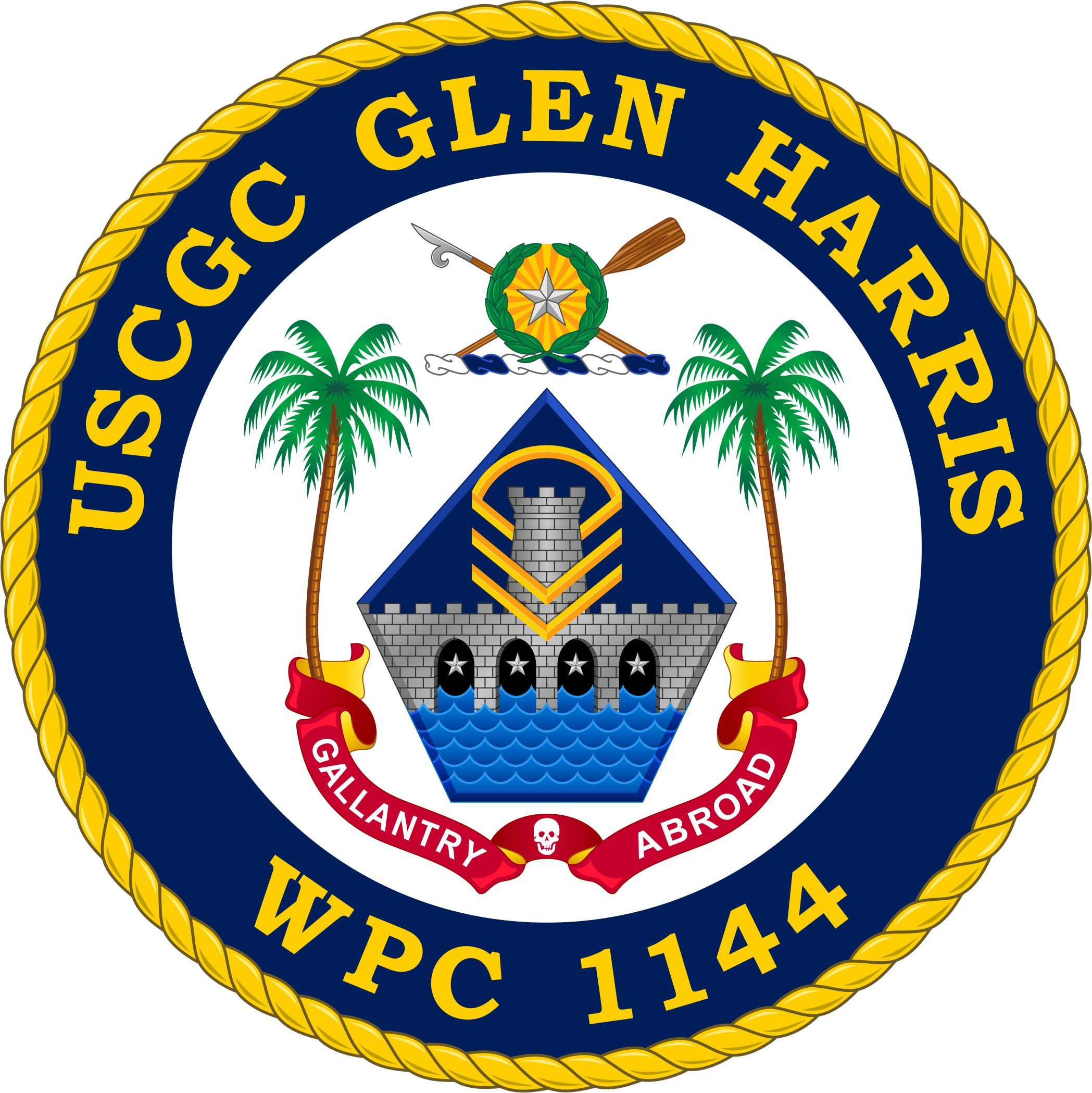
- Badge

General characteristics
- Class & type: Sentinel-class cutter
- Displacement: 353 long tons (359 t)
- Length: 46.8 m (154 ft)
- Beam: 8.11 m (26.6 ft)
- Depth: 2.9 m (9.5 ft)
- Propulsion: 2 × 4,300 kW (5,800 shp); 1 × 75 kW (101 shp) bow thruster
- Speed: 28 knots (52 km/h; 32 mph)
- Range: 2,500 nautical miles (4,600 km; 2,900 mi)
- Endurance: 5 days
- Boats & landing craft carried: 1 × Cutter Boat - Over the Horizon Interceptor
- Complement: 4 officers, 20 crew
- Sensors & processing systems: L-3 C4ISR suite
- Armament: 1 × Mk 38 Mod 2 25 mm automatic gun; 4 × crew-served Browning M2 machine guns

USCGC Glen Harris (WPC-1144) is the United States Coast Guard's 44th Sentinel-class cutter.

== Design ==
Like her sister ships, Glen Harris is designed to perform search and rescue missions, port security, and the interception of smugglers. She is armed with a remotely-controlled, gyro-stabilized 25 mm autocannon, four crew-served M2 Browning machine guns, and light arms. She is equipped with a stern launching ramp, that allows her to launch or retrieve a water-jet propelled high-speed auxiliary boat, without first coming to a stop. Her high-speed boat has the over-the-horizon capability, is useful for inspecting other vessels, and deploying boarding parties.

The crew's drinking water needs are met through a desalination unit. The crew mess is equipped with a television with satellite reception.

== Operational career ==
While as a pre-commissioning unit Glen Harris was deployed to assist the Seacor Power, a 234-foot liftboat. She arrived on the scene within 30-minutes and was able to rescue one of the six survivors. Reportedly, 19 people were aboard. Glen Harris was formally commissioned at Fort Macon in North Carolina near her namesake's birthplace on August 6, 2021.

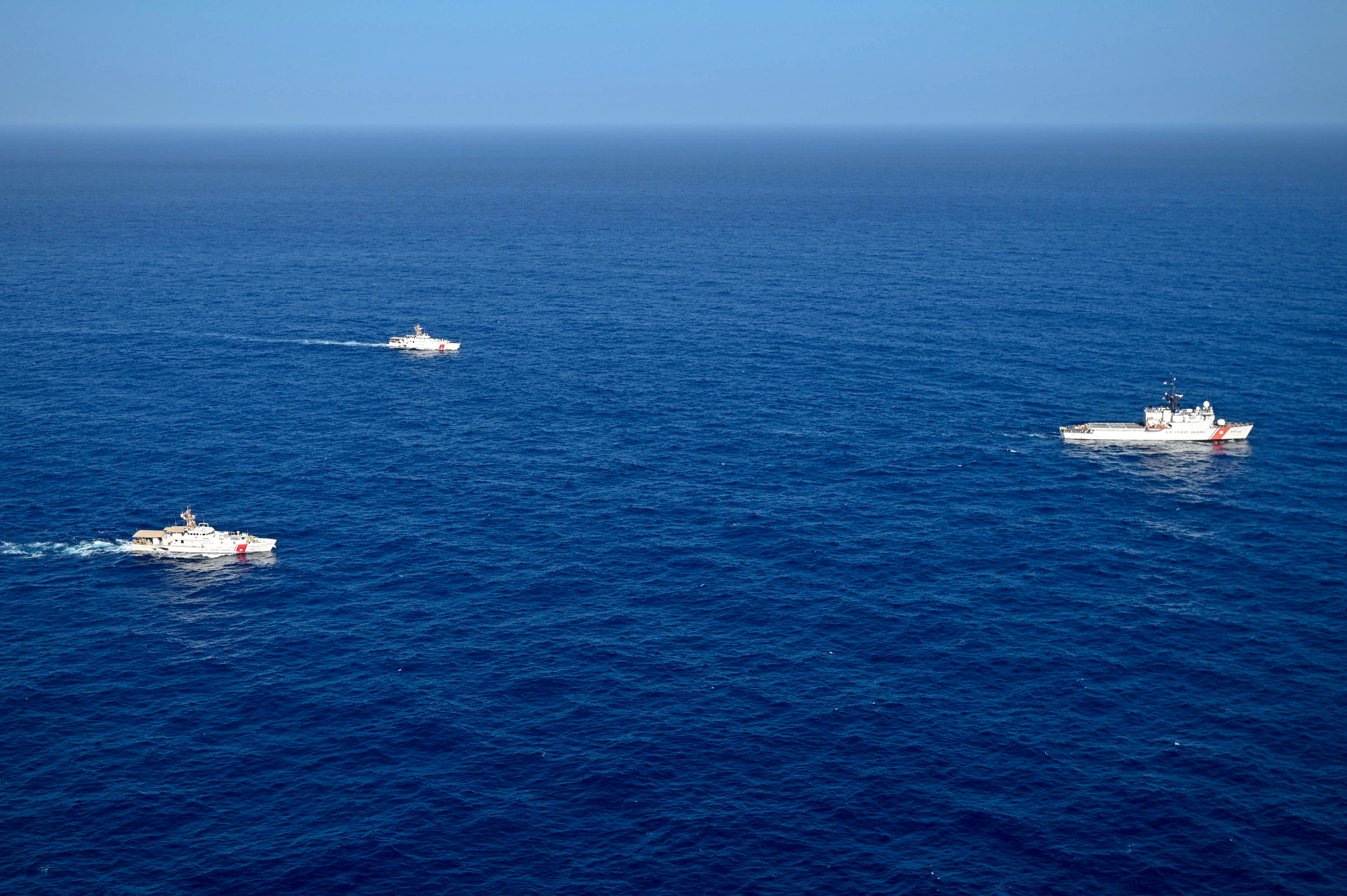
Glen Harris and Emlen Tunnell trail Thetis (right) after crossing the Atlantic Ocean

Glen Harris and her sister ship Emlen Tunnell left Key West, Florida on November 18, 2021, escorted by the medium-endurance cutter Thetis. After conducting at-sea refueling training off Puerto Rico on December 11, 2021, the three ships arrived in Mindelo, Cabo Verde on December 29, 2021. On January 5, 2022, the three Coast Guard vessels and a Royal Moroccan Navy frigate rescued 103 migrants and recovered two bodies from two rafts that were taking on water forty miles west of the Moroccan coast.

== Namesake ==
In 2010, Master Chief Petty Officer of the Coast Guard Charles "Skip" W. Bowen, who was then the United States Coast Guard's most senior non-commissioned officer, proposed that all 58 cutters in the Sentinel-class should be named after enlisted sailors in the Coast Guard, or one of its precursor services, who were recognized for their heroism. The Coast Guard chose Glen Harris as the namesake of the 36th cutter. Harris, and three other Coast Guard sailors, piloted the first landing craft during the United States' first amphibious landing, in the Pacific Theater, in World War II. Harris and his three colleagues were each awarded a Silver Star medal for this task. His colleagues Daniel Tarr and Harold Miller have Sentinel-class cutters named after them, as will his other colleague William Sparling.
