= Title 33 of the Code of Federal Regulations =

United States federal law governing navigation and navigable waters

Title 33 is the portion of the Code of Federal Regulations that governs Navigation and Navigable Waters within the United States. It is available in digital or printed form.

Title 33 and Title 46 of the Code of Federal Regulations are usually consulted by Classification societies, engineering firms, deck officers on oceangoing vessels, and marine engineers.

It is divided into three chapters:

- Chapter I — United States Coast Guard,
- Chapter II — Army Corps of Engineers,
- Chapter IV[sic.] — Great Lakes St. Lawrence Seaway Development Corporation.

== Chapter I ==
Part	Title	Comments
1	General provisions	
2	Jurisdiction	
3	Coast Guard areas, districts, marine inspection zones, and captain of the port zones	
4	OMB control numbers assigned pursuant to the Paperwork Reduction Act	
5	Coast Guard Auxiliary	
6	Protection and security of vessels, harbors, and waterfront facilities	
8	United States Coast Guard Reserve	
13	Decorations, medals, ribbons and similar devices	
17	United States Coast Guard general gift fund	
19	Waivers of navigation and vessel inspection laws and regulations	
20	Rules of practice, procedure, and evidence for formal administrative proceedings of the Coast Guard	
23	Distinctive markings for Coast Guard vessels and aircraft	
25	Claims	
26	Vessel bridge-to-bridge radiotelephone regulations	
27	Adjustment of civil monetary penalties for inflation	
Index to Subchapter A--General
40	Cadets of the Coast Guard	
45	Enlistment of personnel	
49	Payment of amounts due mentally incompetent Coast Guard personnel	
50	Coast Guard Retiring Review Board	
51	Coast Guard Discharge Review Board	
52	Board for Correction of Military Records of the Coast Guard	
53	Coast Guard whistleblower protection	
54	Allotments from active duty pay for certain support obligations	
55	Child Development Services	
Index to Subchapter B--Military Personnel
60	[Reserved]	
62	United States aids to navigation system	
64	Marking of structures, sunken vessels and other obstructions	
66	Private aids to navigation	
67	Aids to navigation on artificial islands and fixed structures	
70	Interference with or damage to aids to navigation	
72	Marine information	
74	Charges for Coast Guard aids to navigation work	
76	Sale and transfer of aids to navigation equipment	
Index to Subchapter C--Aids to Navigation
80	COLREGS demarcation lines	
81	72 COLREGS: Implementing Rules	
82	72 COLREGS: Interpretative Rules	
Index to Subchapter D--International Navigation Rules
84	Annex I: Positioning and technical details of lights and shapes	
85	Annex II: Additional signals for fishing vessels fishing in close proximity	
86	Annex III: Technical details of sound signal appliances	
87	Annex IV: Distress signals	
88	Annex V: Pilot rules	
89	Inland navigation rules: implementing rules	
90	Inland rules: Interpretative rules	
Index to Subchapter E--Inland Navigation Rules
95	Operating a vessel while under the influence of alcohol or a dangerous drug	
96	Rules for the safe operation of vessels and safety management systems	
Index to Subchapter F--Vessel Operating Regulations
100	Safety of life on navigable waters	
Index to Subchapter G--Regattas and Marine Parades
101	Maritime Security: General	
102	Maritime Security: National maritime transportation security [Reserved]	
103	Maritime security: Area maritime security	
104	Maritime security: Vessels	
105	Maritime security: Facilities	
106	Marine Security: Outer Continental Shelf (OCS) facilities	
107	National Vessel and Facility Control Measures and Limited Access Areas	
Index to Subchapter H--General Maritime Security
109	General	
110	Anchorage regulations	
Index to Subchapter I--Anchorages
114	General	
115	Bridge locations and clearances; administrative procedures	
116	Alteration of unreasonably obstructive bridges	
117	Drawbridge operation regulations	
118	Bridge lighting and other signals	
Index to Subchapter J--Bridges		
120	Security of passenger vessels	
Index to Subchapter K--Security of Vessels
125	Identification credentials for persons requiring access to waterfront facilities or vessels	
126	Handling of dangerous cargo at waterfront facilities	
127	Waterfront facilities handling liquefied natural gas and liquefied hazardous gas	
128	Security of passenger terminals	
Index to Subchapter L
133	Oil spill liability trust fund; State access	
135	Offshore oil pollution compensation fund	
136	Oil spill liability trust fund; claims procedures; designation of source; and advertisement	
138	Financial responsibility for water pollution (vessels)	
Index to Subchapter M		
140	General	
141	Personnel	
142	Workplace safety and health	
143	Design and equipment	
144	Lifesaving appliances	
145	Fire-fighting equipment	
146	Operations	
147	Safety zones	
Index to Subchapter N
148	Deepwater ports: General	
149	Deepwater ports: Design, construction, and equipment	
150	Deepwater ports: Operations	
Index to Subchapter NN
151	Vessels carrying oil, noxious liquid substances, garbage, municipal or commercial waste, and ballast water	
153	Control of pollution by oil and hazardous substances, discharge removal	
154	Facilities transferring oil or hazardous material in bulk	
155	Oil or hazardous material pollution prevention regulations for vessels	
156	Oil and hazardous material transfer operations	
157	Rules for the protection of the marine environment relating to tank vessels carrying oil in bulk	
158	Reception facilities for oil, noxious liquid substances, and garbage	
159	Marine sanitation devices	
Index to Subchapter O
160	Ports and waterways safety--general	
161	Vessel traffic management	
162	Inland waterways navigation regulations	
163	Towing of barges	
164	Navigation safety regulations	
165	Regulated navigation areas and limited access areas	
166	Shipping safety fairways	
167	Offshore traffic separation schemes	
168	Escort requirements for certain tankers	
169	Ship reporting systems	
Index to Subchapter P
173	Vessel numbering and casualty and accident reporting	
174	State numbering and casualty reporting systems	
175	Equipment requirements	
177	Correction of especially hazardous conditions	
179	Defect notification	
181	Manufacturer requirements	
183	Boats and associated equipment	
184-186	[Reserved]	
187	Vessel identification system	
188-199	[Reserved]	
Index to Subchapter S

== Chapter II ==
Part	Title	Comments
203	Emergency employment of Army and other resources, natural disaster procedures	
207	Navigation regulations	
208	Flood control regulations	
209	Administrative procedure	
210	Procurement activities of the Corps of Engineers	
211	Real estate activities of the Corps of Engineers in connection with civil works projects	
214	Emergency supplies of drinking water	
220	Design criteria for dam and lake projects	
221	Work for others	
222	Engineering and design	
223	Boards, commissions, and committees	
230	Procedures for implementing NEPA	
236	Water resource policies and authorities: Corps of Engineers participation in improvements for environmental quality	
238	Water resources policies and authorities: Flood damage reduction measures in urban areas	
239	Water resources policies and authorities: Federal participation in covered flood control channels	
240	General credit for flood control	
241	Flood control cost-sharing requirements under the ability to pay provision	
242	Flood Plain Management Services Program establishment of fees for cost recovery	
245	Removal of wrecks and other obstructions	
263	Continuing authorities programs	
273	Aquatic plant control	
274	Pest control program for civil works projects	
276	Water resources policies and authorities: Application of section 134a of Public Law 94-587	
277	Water resources policies and authorities: Navigation policy: Cost apportionment of bridge alterations	
279	Resource use: Establishment of objectives	
320	General regulatory policies	
321	Permits for dams and dikes in navigable waters of the United States	
322	Permits for structures or work in or affecting navigable waters of the United States	
323	Permits for discharges of dredged or fill material into waters of the United States	
324	Permits for ocean dumping of dredged material	
325	Processing of Department of the Army permits	
326	Enforcement	
327	Public hearings	
328	Definition of waters of the United States	
329	Definition of navigable waters of the United States	
330	Nationwide permit program	
331	Administrative appeal process	
334	Danger zone and restricted area regulations	
335	Operation and maintenance of Army Corps of Engineers civil works projects involving the discharge of dredged or fill material into waters of the U.S. or ocean waters	
336	Factors to be considered in the evaluation of Army Corps of Engineers dredging projects involving the discharge of dredged material into waters of the U.S. and ocean waters	
337	Practice and procedure	
338	Other Corps activities involving the discharge of dredged material or fill into waters of the U.S.	
384	Intergovernmental review of Department of the Army Corps of Engineers programs and activities	
385	Programmatic regulations for the comprehensive Everglades Restoration Plan	

== Chapter IV ==
Part	Title	Comments
401	Seaway regulations and rules	
402	Tariff of tolls	
403	Rules of procedure of the Joint Tolls Review Board	
404-499	[Reserved]	
