= Seacor Power =

History

United States
- Name: Seacor Power
- Owner: Seacor Marine
- Launched: 2002
- Fate: Capsized in the Gulf of Mexico on 13 April 2021

General characteristics
- Class & type: 265 class
- Type: Liftboat
- Length: 71 m (232 ft 11 in)

Seacor Power was a 234-foot (71 m), 265 Class liftboat, constructed in 2002, belonging to Seacor Marine and flagged in the United States. The ship was powered by two Caterpillar 3508B@1900hp engines.

== Capsizing incident ==
On April 13, 2021 Seacor Power capsized in the Gulf of Mexico, around 8 miles (13 km) off Port Fourchon, Louisiana, United States. Rescue attempts resulted in six successful rescues (one each by two United States Coast Guard (USCG) ships, and four by civilian vessels). The other 13 crew members are confirmed or presumed to have died. The search for survivors was called off by the Coast Guard on April 19, 2021.

The USCG cutter, Glenn Harris arrived within 30 minutes of the incident, despite its pre-commissioning status.

The National Weather Service said that a "wake low" weather pattern resulted in 70 to 80 mph (110 to 130 km/h) winds, and very rough seas. The ship's last reported position according to MarineTraffic was 29°1′40.224″N 90°12′39.636″W.
