= USCGC Thetis (WMEC-910) =

US Coast Guard cutter

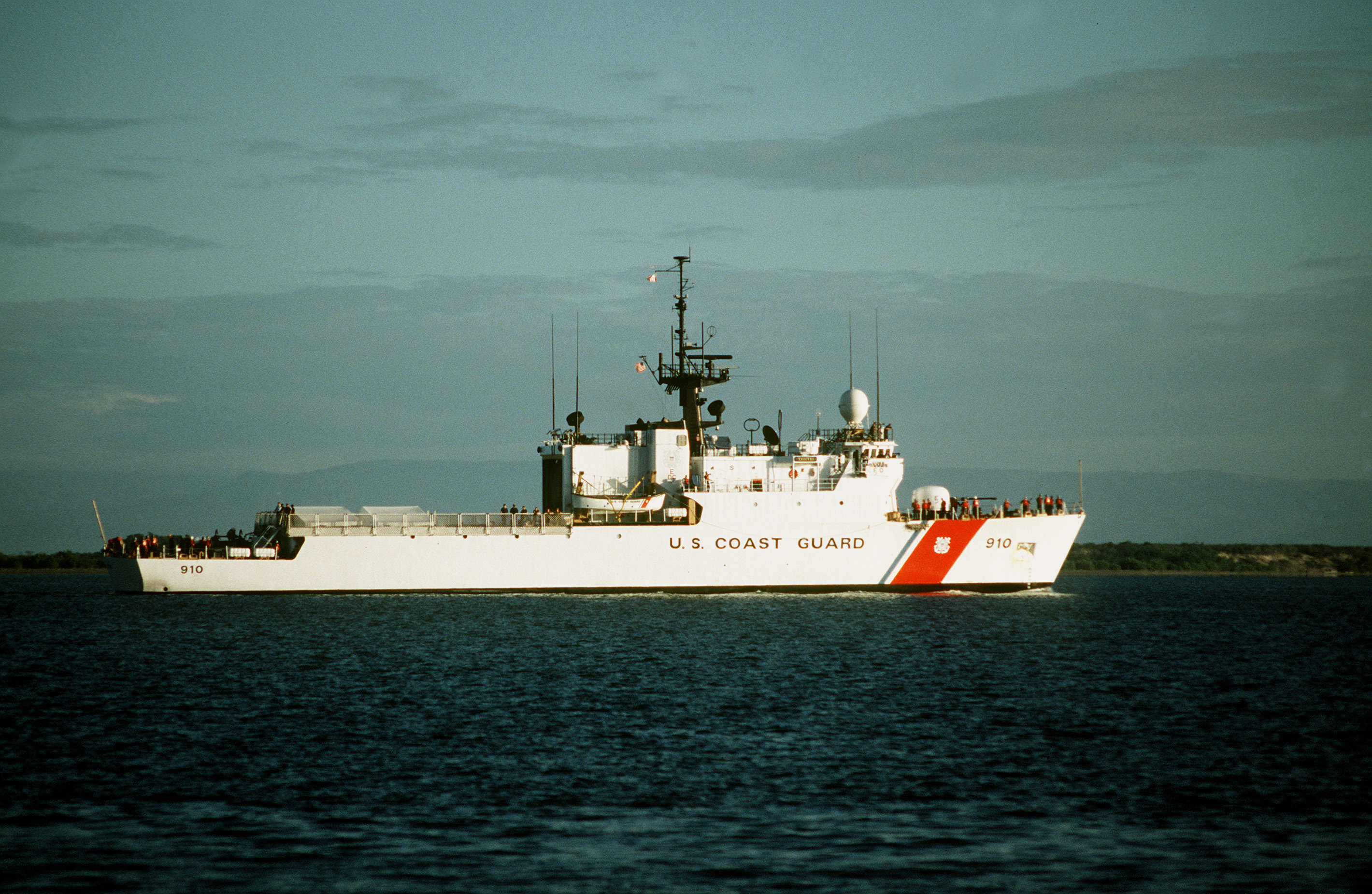
- USCGC Thetis (WMEC-910)

History

United States
- Name: USCGC Thetis
- Namesake: Thetis
- Builder: Derecktor Shipyards, Middletown, Rhode Island
- Laid down: August 24, 1984
- Launched: April 29, 1986
- Commissioned: June 30, 1989
- Home port: Key West, Florida
- Identification: MMSI number: 367876000; Callsign: NYWL
- Motto: Improvise - Adapt - Overcome
- Status: In active service

General characteristics
- Class & type: Famous-class cutter
- Displacement: 1,800 long tons (1,829 t)
- Length: 270 ft (82 m)
- Beam: 38 ft (12 m)
- Draught: 14.5 ft (4.4 m)
- Propulsion: Two turbo-charged ALCO V-18 diesel engines
- Speed: 19.5 knots (36.1 km/h; 22.4 mph)
- Range: 9,900 nautical miles (18,300 km; 11,400 mi)
- Boats & landing craft carried: 1 × Over-the-Horizon (OTH) Interceptor; 1 × RHI with twin 90 HP outboard engines
- Complement: 100 personnel (14 officers, 86 enlisted)
- Sensors & processing systems: MK 92 Fire Control Radar; SPS-73 Surface Search Radar
- Electronic warfare & decoys: AN/SLQ-32 (receive only)
- Armament: 1 × Mk 75 76 mm/62 caliber naval gun; 2 × .50 caliber (12.7 mm) machine guns
- Aircraft carried: HH-65 Dolphin; HH-60 Jayhawk; MH-68 Stingray

USCGC Thetis (WMEC-910) is a United States Coast Guard Famous-class medium endurance cutter. She is the 10th ship of the Famous Class cutters designed and built for the U.S. Coast Guard and the third Coast Guard cutter to bear the name. Laid down August 24, 1984 by Derecktor Shipyards of Middletown, Rhode Island. She was launched April 29, 1986 and named for the cutters USRC Thetis, which served from 1899 to 1916, and USCGC Thetis (WPC-115), which served from 1931 to 1947. The Greek goddess Thetis, incidentally, was the mother of Achilles. The Famous Class cutter Thetis was commissioned on June 30, 1989. She conducts patrols throughout the Caribbean and the Gulf of Mexico.

Her homeport is Key West, Florida.

Her duties include law enforcement, search and rescue, homeland security, and national defense. Patrols last anywhere up to two to three months.

As part of Operation Martillo, the Thetis conducted drug interdiction missions in the Eastern Pacific, along the coasts of Central and South America. Its 68-day patrol netted 15,000 pounds of cocaine and other illegal narcotics.

In December 2021, after visiting Fortaleza in Brazil, the Thetis escorted the new fast response cutters Glen Harris and Emlen Tunnell across the Atlantic Ocean on the way to their assigned homeport of Manama, Bahrain. On January 5, 2022, the three Coast Guard vessels and a Royal Moroccan Navy frigate rescued 103 migrants from two rafts that were taking on water and also recovered two bodies forty miles west of the Moroccan coast.
