= Title 46 of the Code of Federal Regulations =

U.S. federal rules and regulations on maritime law

Title 46 is the portion of the Code of Federal Regulations that governs shipping within the United States for the United States Coast Guard, the United States Maritime Administration, and the United States Maritime Commission. It is available in digital or printed form.

Title 46 and Title 33 of the Code of Federal Regulations are usually consulted by Classification societies, engineering firms, deck officers on oceangoing vessels, and marine engineers.

It is divided into four chapters:

- Chapter I — United States Coast Guard,
- Chapter II — United States Maritime Administration,
- Chapter III — United States Coast Guard (Great Lakes Pilotage), and
- Chapter IV — United States Maritime Commission.

== Chapter I ==
Part	Title	Comments
1	Organization, general course and methods governing marine safety functions	
2	Vessel inspections	
3	Designation of oceanographic research vessels	
4	Marine casualties and investigations.	
5	Marine investigation regulations--personnel action	
6	Waivers of navigation and vessel inspection laws and regulations	
7	Boundary lines	
8	Vessel inspection alternatives	
9	Extra compensation for overtime services	
Index		
10	Licensing of maritime personnel	
12	Certification of seamen	
13	Certification of tankermen	
14	Shipment and discharge of merchant mariners	
15	Manning requirements	
16	Chemical testing	
Index		
24	General provisions	
25	Requirements	
26	Operations	
27	Towing vessels	
28	Requirements for commercial fishing industry vessels	
Index		
30	General provisions	
31	Inspection and certification	
32	Special equipment, machinery, and hull requirements	
34	Firefighting equipment	
35	Operations	
36	Elevated temperature cargoes	
38	Liquefied flammable gases	
39	Vapor control systems	
Index		
41	[Reserved]	
42	Domestic and foreign voyages by sea	
43	[Reserved]	
44	Special service limited domestic voyages	
45	Great Lakes load lines	
46	Subdivision load lines for passenger vessels	
47	Combination load lines	
Index		
50	General provisions	
51	[Reserved]	
52	Power boilers	
53	Heating boilers	
54	Pressure vessels	
56	Piping systems and appurtenances	
57	Welding and brazing	
58	Main and auxiliary machinery and related systems	
59	Repairs to boilers, pressure vessels and appurtenances	
60	[Reserved]	
61	Periodic tests and inspections	
62	Vital system automation	
63	Automatic auxiliary boilers	
64	Marine portable tanks and cargo handling systems	
Index		
66	[Reserved]	
67	Documentation of vessels	
68	Documentation of vessels pursuant to extraordinary legislative grants	
69	Measurement of vessels	
Index		
70	General provisions	
71	Inspection and certification	
72	Construction and arrangement	
76	Fire protection equipment	
77	Vessel control and miscellaneous systems and equipment	
78	Operations	
80	Disclosure of safety standards and country of registry	
81-89	[Reserved]	
Index		
90	General provisions	
91	Inspection and certification	
92	Construction and arrangement	
93	Stability	
95	Fire protection equipment	
96	Vessel control and miscellaneous systems and equipment	
97	Operations	
98	Special construction, arrangement, and other provisions for certain dangerous cargoes in bulk	
105	Commercial fishing vessels dispensing petroleum products	
107	Inspection and certification	
108	Design and equipment	
109	Operations	
Index		
110	General provisions	
111	Electric systems--general requirements	
112	Emergency lighting and power systems	
113	Communication and alarm systems and equipment	
Index		
114	General provisions	
115	Inspection and certification	
116	Construction and arrangement	
117	Lifesaving equipment and arrangements	
118	Fire protection equipment	
119	Machinery installation	
120	Electrical installation	
121	Vessel control and miscellaneous systems and equipment	
122	Operations	
123-124	[Reserved]	
Index		
125	General	
126	Inspection and certification	
127	Construction and arrangements	
128	Marine engineering: Equipment and systems	
129	Electrical installations	
130	Vessel control, and miscellaneous equipment and systems	
131	Operations	
132	Fire-protection equipment	
133	Lifesaving systems	
134	Added provisions for liftboats	
135-139	[Reserved]	
Index		
140-146	[Reserved]	
147	Hazardous ships' stores	
147A	Interim regulations for shipboard fumigation	
148	Carriage of solid hazardous materials in bulk	
149	[Reserved]	
150	Compatibility of cargoes	
151	Barges carrying bulk liquid hazardous material cargoes	
152	[Reserved]	
153	Ships carrying bulk liquid, liquefied gas, or compressed gas hazardous materials	
154	Safety standards for self-propelled vessels carrying bulk liquefied gases	
155	[Reserved]	
159	Approval of equipment and materials	
160	Lifesaving equipment	
161	Electrical equipment	
162	Engineering equipment	
163	Construction	
164	Materials	
165	[Reserved]	
Index		
166	Designation and approval of nautical school ships	
167	Public nautical school ships	
168	Civilian nautical school vessels	
169	Sailing school vessels	
Index		
170	Stability requirements for all inspected vessels	
171	Special rules pertaining to vessels carrying passengers	
172	Special rules pertaining to bulk cargoes	
173	Special rules pertaining to vessel use	
174	Special rules pertaining to specific vessel types	
Index		
175	General provisions	
176	Inspection and certification	
177	Construction and arrangement	
178	Intact stability and seaworthiness	
179	Subdivision, damage stability, and watertight integrity	
180	Lifesaving equipment and arrangements	
181	Fire protection equipment	
182	Machinery installation	
183	Electrical installation	
184	Vessel control and miscellaneous systems and equipment	
185	Operations	
186-187	[Reserved]	
Index		
188	General provisions	
189	Inspection and certification	
190	Construction and arrangement	
191-192	[Reserved]	
193	Fire protection equipment	
194	Handling, use, and control of explosives and other hazardous materials	
195	Vessel control and miscellaneous systems and equipment	
196	Operations	
Index		
197	General provisions	
198	[Reserved]	
Index		
199	Lifesaving systems for certain inspected vessels	
Index		

== Chapter II ==
Part	Title	Comments
200	[Reserved]	
201	Rules of practice and procedure	
202	Procedures relating to review by Secretary of Transportation of actions by Maritime Subsidy Board	
203	Procedures relating to conduct of certain hearings under the Merchant Marine Act of 1936, as amended	
204	Claims against the Maritime Administration under the Federal Tort Claims Act	
205	Audit appeals; policy and procedure	
221	Regulated transactions involving documented vessels and other maritime interests	
232	Uniform financial reporting requirements	
249	Approval of underwriters for marine hull insurance	
251	Application for subsidies and other direct financial aid	
252	Operating-differential subsidy for bulk cargo vessels engaged in worldwide services	
272	Requirements and procedures for conducting condition surveys and administering maintenance and repair subsidy	
276	Construction-differential subsidy repayment	
277	Domestic and foreign trade; interpretations	
280	Limitations on the award and payment of operating-differential subsidy for liner operators	
281	Information and procedure required under liner operating-differential subsidy agreements	
282	Operating-differential subsidy for liner vessels engaged in essential services in the foreign commerce of the United States	
283	Dividend policy for operators receiving operating-differential subsidy	
287	Establishment of construction reserve funds	
289	Insurance of construction-differential subsidy vessels, operating-differential subsidy vessels and of vessels sold or adjusted under the Merchant Ship Sales Act 1946	
295	Maritime Security Program (MSP)	
296	Maritime Security Program (MSP)	
298	Obligation guarantees	
307	Establishment of mandatory position reporting system for vessels	
308	War risk insurance	
309	Values for war risk insurance	
310	Merchant Marine training	
315	Agency agreements and appointment of agents	
317	Bonding of ship's personnel	
324	Procedural rules for financial transactions under Agency agreements	
325	Procedure to be followed by general agents in preparation of invoices and payment of compensation pursuant to provisions of NSA Order No. 47	
326	Marine protection and indemnity insurance under agreements with agents	
327	Seamen's claims; administrative action and litigation	
328	Slop chests	
329	Voyage data	
330	Launch services	
332	Repatriation of seamen	
335	Authority and responsibility of general agents to undertake emergency repairs in foreign ports	
336	Authority and responsibility of general agents to undertake in continental United States ports voyage repairs and service equipment of vessels operated for the account of the National Shipping Authority under general agency agreement	
337	General agent's responsibility in connection with foreign repair custom's entries	
338	Procedure for accomplishment of vessel repairs under National Shipping Authority master lump sum repair contract--NSA-LUMPSUMREP	
339	Procedure for accomplishment of ship repairs under National Shipping Authority individual contract for minor repairs--NSA-WORKSMALREP	
340	Priority use and allocation of shipping services, containers and chassis, and port facilities and services for national security and national defense related operations	
345	Restrictions upon the transfer or change in use or in terms governing utilization of port facilities	
346	Federal port controllers	
347	Operating contract	
349	Reemployment rights of certain merchant seamen	
350	Seamen's service awards	
351	Depositories	
355	Requirements for establishing United States citizenship	
356	Requirements for vessels of 100 feet or greater in registered length to obtain a fishery endorsement to the vessel's documentation	
370	Claims	
380	Procedures	
381	Cargo preference--U.S.-flagged vessels	
382	Determination of fair and reasonable rates for the carriage of bulk and packaged preference cargoes on U.S.-flagged commercial vessels	
383	[Reserved]	
385	Research and development grant and cooperative agreements regulations	
386	Regulations governing public buildings and grounds at the United States Merchant Marine Academy	
387	Utilization and disposal of surplus Federal real property for development or operation of a port facility	
388	Administrative waivers of the Coastwise Trade Laws	
390	Capital Construction Fund	
391	Federal income tax aspects of the Capital Construction Fund	
392-399	[Reserved]	

== Chapter III ==
Part	Title	Comments
400	[Reserved]	
401	Great Lakes pilotage regulations	
402	Great Lakes pilotage rules and orders	
403	Great Lakes pilotage uniform accounting system	
404	Great Lakes pilotage ratemaking	

== Chapter IV ==
Part	Title	Comments
500	[Reserved]	
501	The Federal Maritime Commission--General	
502	Rules of practice and procedure	
503	Public information	
504	Procedures for environmental policy analysis	
505	Administrative offset	
506	Civil monetary penalty inflation adjustment	
507	Enforcement of nondiscrimination on the basis of handicap in programs or activities conducted by the Federal Maritime Commission	
508	Employee ethical conduct standards and financial disclosure regulations	
515	Licensing, financial responsibility requirements, and general duties for ocean transportation intermediaries	
520	Carrier automated tariffs	
525	Marine terminal operator schedules	
530	Service contracts	
531	NVOCC Service arrangements	
535	Ocean common carrier and marine terminal operator agreements subject to the Shipping Act of 1984	
540	Passenger vessel financial responsibility	
545	Interpretations and statements of policy	
550	Regulations to adjust or meet conditions unfavorable to shipping in the foreign trade of the United States	
551	Actions to adjust or meet conditions unfavorable to shipping in the U.S. foreign trade	
555	Actions to address adverse conditions affecting U.S.-flag carriers that do not exist for foreign carriers in the United States	
560	Actions to address conditions unduly impairing access of U.S.-flag vessels to ocean trade between foreign ports	
565	Controlled carriers	
