= HMS Nonsuch =

Several vessels of the Royal Navy have been named HMS Nonsuch, presumably named after Nonsuch Palace:

- English ship Nonsuch (1603), a 38-gun great ship, rebuilt from a previous ship and sold c. 1645
- English ship Nonsuch (1646), a 34-gun ship launched in 1646 and wrecked 1664
- Nonsuch, an 8-gun ketch launched in 1650 that the Royal Navy purchased in 1654 and sold in 1667; later as the merchant vessel Nonsuch she made the trading voyage establishing the Hudson's Bay Company
- HMS Nonsuch (1668), a 36-gun fifth rate launched in 1668. Upgraded to a 42-gun fourth rate in 1669, but reverted to 36-gun fifth rate in 1691. She was captured in 1695 by the French privateer Le Francais
- HMS Nonsuch (1686), a 5-gun hoy launched in 1686 and sold 1714
- HMS Nonsuch (1696), a 48-gun fourth-rate ship of the line, launched in 1696, rebuilt 1717, and broken up in 1745
- HMS Nonsuch (1741), a 50-gun fourth-rate ship of the line in service from 1741 to 1766
- HMS Nonsuch (1774), a 64-gun third-rate ship of the line launched in 1774, used as a floating battery from 1794, and broken up in 1802
- HMS Nonsuch (1915), an Admiralty M-class destroyer launched in 1915 and sold in 1921
- HMS Nonsuch (1945), a Black Swan-class sloop laid down in February 1945 and canceled in October of that year
- HMS Nonsuch (D107), the former German Type 1936A ('Narvik') destroyer Z38 taken after the end of World War II, and scrapped in 1949

== Battle honours ==
- Kentish Knock 1652
- Portland 1653
- Gabbard 1653
- Texel 1673
- St. Lucia 1778
- The Saints 1782
- Jutland 1916

== See also ==
- HMCS Nonsuch, a Canadian Forces Naval Reserve division in Edmonton, Alberta
- HMS Nonsuch is used as a sample ship name by the Royal Navy, signifying a hypothetical vessel, or a "ghost consort"
- A fictional HMS Nonsuch (a 74-gun ship of the line) appears in the tales of Horatio Hornblower
