= His Majesty's Army Vessel =

Ship prefix

British Army Ensign

His or Her Majesty's Army Vessel (HMAV) is the prefix used for a ship which is an operational unit of the British Army, commanded by British Army officers and crewed by army personnel in uniform. These ships fly the Army ensign.

Prior to the 20th century it was a ship prefix for His (or Her) Majesty's Armed Vessel.
