= Her Majesty's Armed Vessel =

Ship prefix

Her or His Majesty's Armed Vessel (HMAV) was a ship prefix formerly used for certain Royal Navy ships.

The HMAV prefix now means His Majesty's Army Vessel.
