= HMCS Nonsuch =

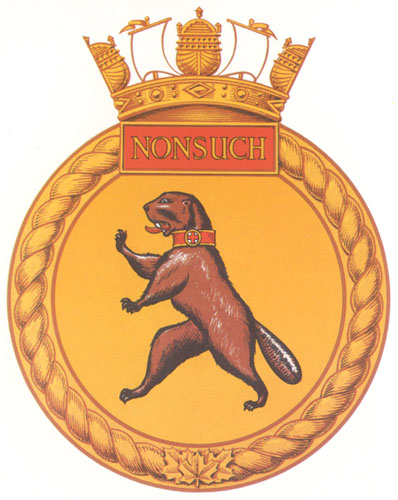
- Active: 1927–present
- Country: Canada
- Branch: Royal Canadian Navy
- Type: Stone frigate
- Role: Reserve unit
- Part of: Canadian Forces Naval Reserve
- Garrison/HQ: Edmonton, Alberta
- Motto: A campis ad maria (Latin for 'From the prairies to the sea')
- Colours: Gold and scarlet
- Battle honours: First Anglo-Dutch War; Kentish Knock, 1652; Portland, 1653; Gabbard, 1653; Franco-Dutch War; Texel, 1673; American Revolutionary War; St. Lucia, 1778; The Saints, 1782; Great War; Jutland, 1916

HMCS Nonsuch is a naval reserve division (NRD) in Edmonton, Alberta. Dubbed a stone frigate, HMCS Nonsuch is a land-based naval establishment for part-time sailors as well as a local recruitment centre for the Canadian Forces Naval Reserve. It is one of 24 naval reserve divisions located in major cities across Canada.

== Operations ==
Nonsuch is properly referred to as a ship, being commissioned into the Royal Canadian Navy. She is part of the Reserves, and therefore operations are usually held on weekdays and certain weekends. However, her sailors may participate in any operation run by the Canadian Armed Forces year round, if they so choose.

== History ==
His Majesty's Canadian Ship (HMCS) Nonsuch was founded on 9 April 1923, as a Royal Canadian Naval Volunteer Reserve half-company. On 1 November 1941 she was commissioned as a tender to HMCS Naden, now part of CFB Esquimalt. She was commissioned as the independent unit, HMCS Nonsuch, on 1 September 1942. During World War 2, over 3500 sailors, and 114 officers were enlisted at Nonsuch. After the war she transitioned into a peacetime force, and was paid off on 30 November 1964. She was recommissioned on September 26, 1975.

Nonsuch has two historic naval weapons outside of the building. One is a mark 12 5"/38 calibre gun, from the United States. It was originally to be used on a US Navy destroyer; however, the Second World War ended before the ship was built. The gun comes from a pair handed over to Canada for testing. The two guns were used to fire various ammunition in CFB Suffield, in southern Alberta. When they were deemed to have completed their jobs, they were turned over to HMCS Nonsuch and HMCS Tecumseh, located in Calgary.

The second weapon Nonsuch has is a Bliss-Leavitt Mark 9 torpedo from the Second World War, as would have been launched from Canadian destroyers.

== Battle honours ==
HMCS Nonsuch carries on the battle honours of 11 Royal Navy ships bearing her name in the past.

=== Pre–First World War ===
- Kentish Knock, 1652,
- Portland, 1653
- Gabbard, 1653
- Texel, 1673
- St Lucia, 1778
- The Saints, 1782

=== First World War ===
- Jutland, 1916

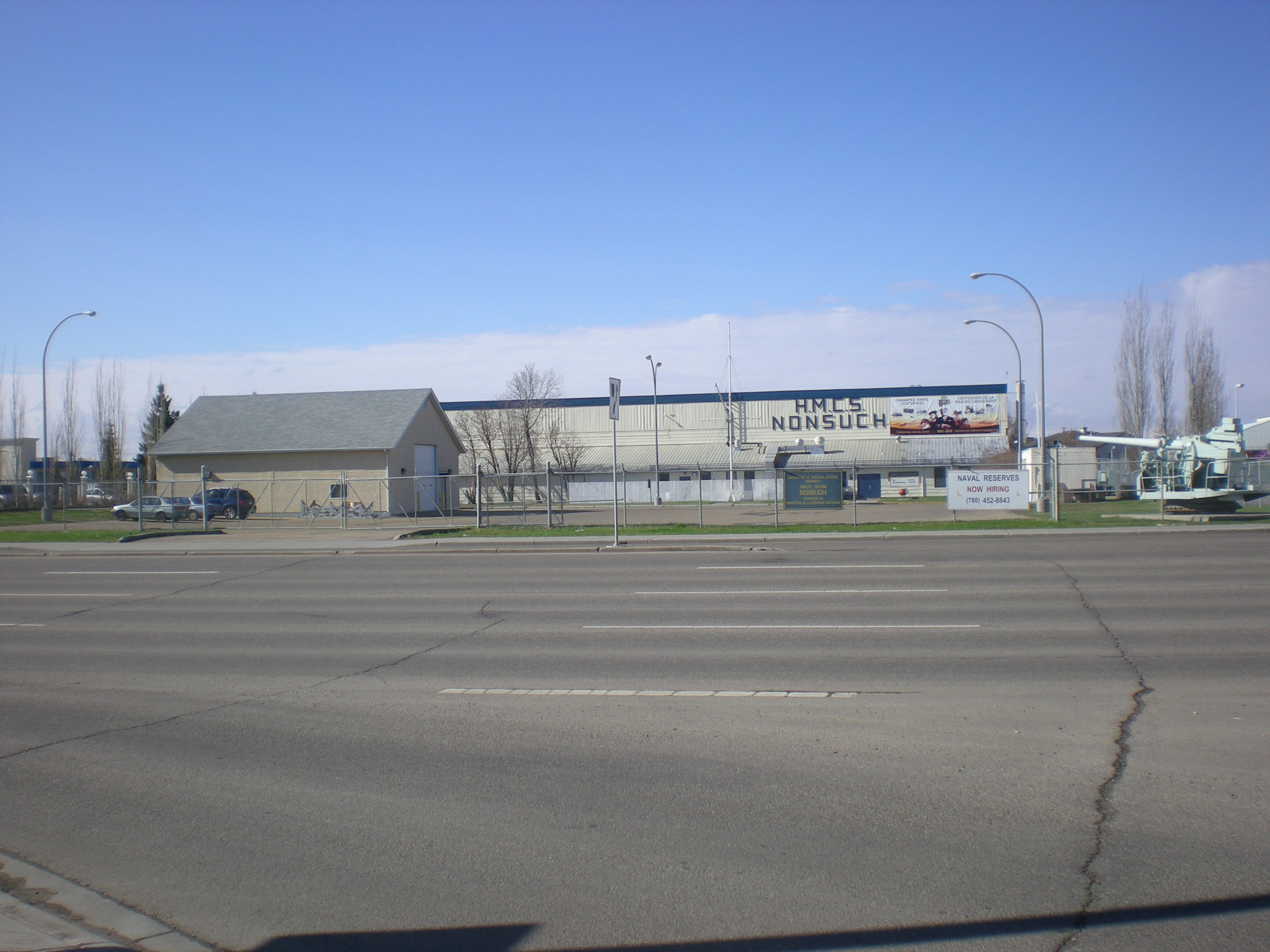
HMCS Nonsuch in Edmonton, Alberta

== Badge ==
=== Description ===
Or a beaver rampant proper gorged with a collar Gules edged Or upon which a roundel displaying the device of St. George.

== Etymology ==
Nonsuch's name comes from the French phrase non pareil meaning "of no equal". Besides being used as a name for many former RN warships, Nonsuch was also the first overseas ship into Hudson Bay, in 1688.
