= HMS Nonsuch (1741) =

Ship of the line of the Royal Navy

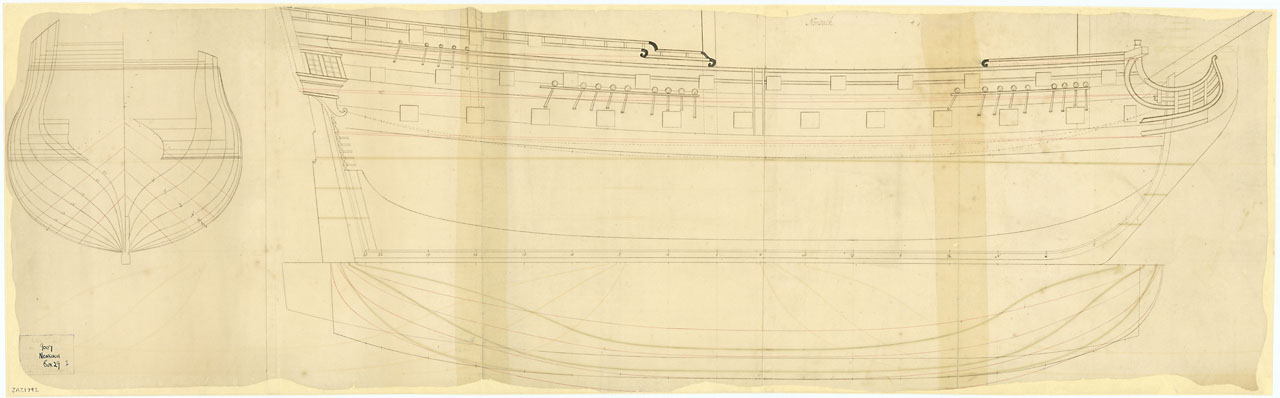
- Drawing showing the body plan, sheer lines, and longitudinal half-breadth for the Nonsuch

History

Great Britain
- Name: HMS Nonsuch
- Ordered: 28 April 1740
- Builder: Quallet, Rotherhithe
- Launched: 29 December 1741
- Fate: Broken up, 1766

General characteristics
- Class & type: 1733 proposals 50-gun fourth rate ship of the line
- Tons burthen: 852
- Length: 134 ft (40.8 m) (gundeck)
- Beam: 38 ft 6 in (11.7 m)
- Depth of hold: 15 ft 9 in (4.8 m)
- Propulsion: Sails
- Sail plan: Full-rigged ship
- Armament: 50 guns: Gundeck: 22 × 18 pdrs; Upper gundeck: 22 × 9 pdrs; Quarterdeck: 4 × 6 pdrs; Forecastle: 2 × 6 pdrs

HMS Nonsuch was a 50-gun fourth rate ship of the line of the Royal Navy, built to the 1733 proposals of the 1719 Establishment at Rotherhithe, and launched on 29 December 1741.

Nonsuch served until 1766, when she was broken up.
