= Ship prefix =

Type of abbreviation used to describe ships

A ship prefix is a combination of letters, usually abbreviations, used in front of the name of a civilian or naval ship that has historically served numerous purposes, such as identifying the vessel's mode of propulsion, purpose, or ownership/nationality. In the modern environment, prefixes are cited inconsistently in civilian service, whereas in government service a vessel's prefix is seldom omitted due to government regulations dictating that a certain prefix be used. Today the common practice is to use a single prefix for all warships of a nation's navy, and other prefixes for auxiliaries and ships of allied services, such as coast guards. For example, the modern navy of Japan adopts the prefix "JS" – Japanese Ship, or the US navy has adopted the USS prefix. However, not all navies use prefixes. Among the blue-water navies, those of France, Brazil, China, Russia, Germany, Ukraine, and Spain do not use ship prefixes. NATO designations such as FS (French Ship), FGS (Federal German Ship), and SPS (Spanish Ship) can be used if needed.

== Usage ==
Historically, prefixes for civilian vessels often identified the vessel's mode of propulsion, such as "MV" (motor vessel), "SS" (screw steamer; often cited as "steam ship"), or "PS" (paddle steamer).

Today, general civilian prefixes are used inconsistently, and frequently not at all. In terms of abbreviations that may reflect a vessel's purpose or function, technology has introduced a broad variety of differently named vessels onto the world's oceans, such as "LPGC" (liquified petroleum gas carrier), or "TB" (tug-boat), or "DB" (derrick barge). In many cases though, these abbreviations are used for purely formal, legal identification and are not used colloquially or in the daily working environment. Prefixes indicating a vessel's purpose (e.g., "RMS" for a Royal Mail ship or "RV" for research vessel) are also used.

Prefixes used for naval ships primarily reflect ownership, but may also indicate a vessel's type or purpose as a sub-set. Historically, the most significant navy was Britain's Royal Navy, which has usually used the prefix "HMS", standing for "His/Her Majesty's Ship". The Royal Navy also adopted nomenclature that reflected a vessel's type or purpose, e.g. HM Sloop. Commonwealth navies adopted a variation, with, for example, HMAS, HMCS, and HMNZS pertaining to Australia, Canada, and New Zealand, respectively.

In the early days of the United States Navy, abbreviations often included the type of vessel, for instance "USF" (United States Frigate), but this method was abandoned by President Theodore Roosevelt's Executive Order No. 549 of 1907, which made "United States Ship" (USS) the standard signifier for USN ships on active commissioned service. United States Navy prefixes officially only apply while a ship is in active commission, with only the name used before or after a period of commission and for all vessels "in service" rather than commissioned status.

However, not all navies used prefixes; this includes the significant navies of China, France and Russia.

From the 20th century onwards, most navies identify ships by letters or hull numbers (pennant numbers) or a combination of such. These identification codes were, and still are, painted on the side of the ship. Each navy has its own system: the United States Navy uses hull classification symbols, and the Royal Navy (e.g. "D35" is destroyer 35 – HMS Dragon) and other navies of Europe and the Commonwealth use pennant numbers.

These tables list both current and historical prefixes known to have been used.

== Generic (merchant navy) prefixes ==
These prefixes are generally used for merchant vessels of any nationality unless specified.

Prefix	Meaning
AE	Ammunition ship
AFS	Combat stores ship
AHT	Anchor handling tug
AHTS	Anchor handling tug supply
AO	Oiler
AOG	Gasoline tanker
AOR	Replenishment oiler
AOT	Transport oiler
ASDS	Autonomous Spaceport Drone Ship
ATB	Articulated Tug Barge
CRV	Coastal Research Vessel
C/F	Car ferry
CS	Container ship or Cable ship
DB	Derrick barge
DEPV	Diesel Electric Paddle Vessel
DLB	Derrick Lay Barge
DCV	Deepwater Construction Vessel
DSV	Diving support vessel or deep-submergence vehicle
DV	Dead vessel
ERRV	Emergency Response Rescue Vessel
EV	Exploration Vessel
FPSO	Floating production storage and offloading vessel
FPV	Free Piston Vessel or Fishery Protection Vessel
FT	Factory Stern Trawler
FV	Fishing Vessel
GTS	Gas Turbine Ship
HLV	Heavy lift vessel
HMT	Hired military transport (not currently in use)
HMHS	His(/Her) Majesty's Hospital Ship
HSC	High Speed Craft
HSF	High Speed Ferry
HTV	Heavy transport vessel
IRV	International Research Vessel
ITB	Integrated Tug barge
LB	Liftboat
LNG/C	Liquefied natural gas carrier
LPG/C	Liquefied petroleum gas carrier
MF	Motor ferry
MFV	Motor fishing vessel (mainly UK Royal Naval Reserve)
MS (M/S)	Motor ship (interchangeable with MV)
MSV	Multipurpose support/supply vessel
MSY	Motor Sailing Yacht
MT	Motor Tanker
MTS	Marine Towage and Salvage / Tugboat / Motor Turbine Ship
MV (M/V)	Motor Vessel (interchangeable with MS)
MY (M/Y)	Motor Yacht
NB	Narrowboat
NRV	NATO Research Vessel
NS	Nuclear ship
OSV	Offshore supply vessel
PS	Paddle steamer
PSV	Platform supply vessel
QSMV	Quadruple screw motor vessel
QTEV	Quadruple turbo electric vessel
RMP	Royal Mail Packet
RMS	Royal Mail Ship or Royal Mail Steamer
RMV	Royal Mail Vessel
RMMV	Royal Mail Motor Vessel
RNLB	Royal National Lifeboat
RRS	Royal Research Ship
RV / RSV	Research vessel/Research Survey Vessel
SB	Sailing Barge
SL	Steam Launch
SS (S/S)	Single-screw steamship (also used as generic term for any steam-powered ship)
SSCV	Semi-submersible crane vessel
SSS	Sea Scout Ship
SSV	Sailing School Vessel, or Submarine and Special Warfare Support Vessel
ST	Steam tug or Steam trawler
STS	Sail training ship
STV	Sail Training Vessel or Steam Turbine Vessel
SV (S/V)	Sailing Vessel
SY (S/Y)	sailing yacht or steam yacht
TB	Tug boat
TIV	Turbine Installation Vessel
TEV	Turbine electric vessel
TrSS	Triple-screw steamship or steamer
TS	Training Ship or turbine steamship or turbine steam ship
Tr.SMV	Triple-Screw Motor Vessel
TSMV	Twin-Screw Motor Vessel
TSMS	Twin-Screw Motor Ship
TSS	Twin-screw steamship or steamer
TST	Twin-screw tug
TT (T/T)	"Tender to" ..., the prefix is placed on the tender followed by the name of the mother ship; or Turbine Tanker
TV	Training vessel
ULCC	Ultra Large Crude Carrier
USMS	United States Mail Ship
VLCC	Very Large Crude Carrier
YD	Yard derrick/Floating crane
YT	Yard tug/Harbor tug
YTB	Big yard tug/Large harbor tug
YTL	Little yard tug/Small harbor tug
YTM	Medium yard tug/Medium harbor tug
YW	Water barge, self-propelled
YWN	Water barge, non-self-propelled

== National or military prefixes ==
Country	Service	Prefix	Meaning
Albania	Albanian Naval Force	ALS	Albanian Ship (NATO prefix)
Algeria	Algerian National Navy	ANS	Algerian Navy Ship
Argentina	Argentine Navy	ARA	Navy of the Argentine Republic (Spanish: Armada de la República Argentina)
Argentina	Argentine Coast Guard	GC	Argentine Coast Guard Ship (Spanish: Guardacostas)
Australia	Royal Australian Navy	HMAS	His Majesty's Australian Ship/Submarine/Station
Australia	Royal Australian Navy	NUSHIP	New Ship/Submarine (Yet to be commissioned)
Australia	Royal Australian Navy	ADV	Australian Defence Vessel (non-commissioned naval-operated ships)
Australia	Royal Australian Navy	MSA	Minesweeper Auxiliary
Australia	Australian Customs and Border Protection Service	ACV	Australian Customs Vessel
Australia	Australian Border Force	ABFC	Australian Border Force Cutter
Australia (pre-Federation)	Colonial navies of Australia	HMCS	His Majesty's Colonial Ship
Australia (pre-Federation)	Colonial navies of Australia	HMQS	His Majesty's Queensland Ship (Queensland Maritime Defence Force)
Australia (pre-Federation)	Colonial navies of Australia	HMVS	His Majesty's Victorian Ship (Victorian Naval Forces)
Austria-Hungary	Austro-Hungarian Navy	SMS	Seiner Majestät Schiff (His Majesty's Ship)
Azerbaijan	Azerbaijani Navy	ARG	Azərbaycan Respublikasının hərbi Gəmisi (Warship of the Republic of Azerbaijan)
Bahamas	Royal Bahamas Defence Force	HMBS	His Majesty's Bahamian Ship
Bahrain	Royal Bahrain Naval Force	RBNS	Royal Bahrain Naval Ship
Bangladesh	Bangladesh Coast Guard	CGS	Coast Guard Ship
Bangladesh	Bangladesh Navy	BNS	Bangladesh Navy Ship
Barbados	Barbados Coast Guard	BCGS	Barbados Coast Guard Ship
Belgium	Belgian Navy	BNS	Belgian Naval Ship (NATO prefix)
Brazil	Brazilian Navy	(No Official Prefix)	Brazilian naval prefix indicates ship type.
British Raj	Royal Indian Marine (1892–1934)	RIMS	Royal Indian Marine Ship
British Raj	Royal Indian Navy (1934–1950)	HMIS	His Majesty's Indian Ship
Brunei	Royal Brunei Navy	KDB	Kapal Di-Raja Brunei (Royal Brunei Ship)
Bulgaria	Bulgarian Navy	BNG	NATO Designation
Cameroon	Cameroon Navy	CNS	Cameroon Naval Ship
Canada	Royal Canadian Navy (formerly Canadian Forces Maritime Command)	HMCS; NCSM	His Majesty's Canadian Ship (French: Navire canadien de Sa Majesté)
Canada	Royal Canadian Navy (formerly Canadian Forces Maritime Command)	CFAV; NAFC	Canadian Forces Auxiliary Vessel (French: Navire auxiliaire des Forces canadiennes)
Canada	Canadian Coast Guard	CCGS; NGCC	Canadian Coast Guard Ship (French: Navire de Garde côtière canadienne)
Canada	Canadian Coast Guard	CCGC; CGCC	Canadian Coast Guard Cutter (French: Cotre de Garde côtière canadienne) (no longer used)
Canada	Department of Fisheries and Oceans, Department of Transport, and predecessor departments	CGS	Canadian Government Ship (no longer used)
Canada	Department of Fisheries and Oceans, Department of Transport, and predecessor departments	CSS	Canadian Survey Ship (no longer used)
Canada	Department of Fisheries and Oceans, Department of Transport, and predecessor departments	DGS	Dominion Government Ship (no longer used)
Canada	Royal Canadian Sea Cadets	SCTV; NECM	Sea Cadet Training Vessel (French: Navire école des cadets de la Marine)
China	People's Liberation Army Navy	(No Official Prefix)	
Colombia	Armada Nacional	ARC	Armada de la República de Colombia (Navy of the Republic of Colombia)
Confederate States	Confederate States Navy	CSS	Confederate States Ship
Cook Islands	Cook Islands Police	CIPPB	Cook Islands Police Patrol Boat
Denmark	Royal Danish Navy	HDMS (Danish: KDM)	His/Her Danish Majesty's Ship (Danish: Kongelige Danske Marine)
Denmark	Royal Danish Navy	HDMY (Danish: KDM)	His/Her Danish Majesty's Yacht, crewed by Royal Danish Navy
Ecuador	Armada Ecuatoriana	BAE	Buque de la Armada de Ecuador (Ecuadorian Navy Ship)
Egypt	Egyptian Navy	ENS	Egyptian Naval Ship
Estonia	Estonian Navy	EML	Eesti Mereväe Laev (Estonian Naval Vessel)
Estonia	Estonian Coast Guard	ECGS	Estonian Coast Guard Ship (NATO designation)
Ethiopian Empire	Imperial Ethiopian Navy	HMS	His Majesty's Ship (same as royal navy) (1955-1974)
Fiji	Republic of Fiji Navy	RFNS	Republic of Fiji Naval Ship
Finland	Finnish Navy	FNS	Finnish Navy Ship; prefixes are for international identification only and never used internally.
France	French Navy	FS	French Ship (NATO designation); prefixes are for international identification only and never used internally.
German Empire	Kaiserliche Marine	SMS	Seiner Majestät Schiff (His Majesty's Ship)
German Empire	Kaiserliche Marine	SMU	Seiner Majestät Unterseeboot (His Majesty's Submarine)
Nazi Germany	Kriegsmarine	KMS / DKM (No Official Prefix)	Kriegsmarine Schiffe/Deutsche Kriegsmarine (Navy Ship/German Navy)
West Germany	Bundesmarine	FGS	Federal German Ship (NATO designation); only used for international identification and never used internally.
East Germany	Volksmarine		
Germany	German Navy	FGS	Federal German Ship (NATO designation); only used for international identification and never used internally.
Ghana	Ghana Navy	GNS	Ghana Navy Ship
Kingdom of Greece	Royal Hellenic Navy	VP (Greek: ΒΠ)	"Royal Ship" (Greek: Βασιλικόν Πλοίον, romanized: Vassilikón Ploíon); some English language authors use RHNS for Royal Hellenic Navy Ship or HHMS for His Hellenic Majesty's Ship.
Greece	Hellenic Navy	HS	Hellenic Ship (NATO designation); only used for international identification, as prefix indicates ship type internally.
Guyana	Guyanese Coast Guard	GDFS	Guyanese Defence Forces Ship
Kingdom of Hawaii	Hawaiian Navy	HHMS	His Hawaiian Majesty's Ship; the only one being Kaimiloa
Iceland	Icelandic Coast Guard	ICGV (Icelandic: VS)	Icelandic Coast Guard Vessel, (Icelandic:Varðskip)
India	Indian Coast Guard	ICGS	Indian Coast Guard Ship
India	Indian Navy	INS	Indian Naval Ship
Indonesia	Indonesian Navy	RI	Republik Indonesia (Republic of Indonesia). Obsolete prefix used until 1960s.
Indonesia	Indonesian Navy	KRI	Kapal Republik Indonesia (Ship of the Republic of Indonesia)
Indonesia	Indonesian Navy	KAL	Kapal Angkatan Laut (Navy Ship). For small boats which length is less than 36 m.
Indonesia	Indonesian Army	ADRI	Angkatan Darat Republik Indonesia (Indonesian Army)
Indonesia	Indonesian Army	AD	Angkatan Darat (Army). For combat boats.
Indonesia	Indonesian Sea and Coast Guard Unit	KN	Kapal Negara (State Ship)
Indonesia	Indonesian Maritime Security Agency	KN	Kapal Negara (State Ship)
Indonesia	Indonesian Water and Aviation Police Corps	KP	Kapal Polisi (Police Ship)
Indonesia	Directorate General of Marine and Fisheries Resources Surveillance	KP	Kapal Pengawas (Overseer Ship)
Indonesia	National Search and Rescue Agency	KN SAR	Kapal Negara (State Ship) Search and Rescue
Indonesia	Directorate General of Customs and Excise	BC	Bea Cukai (Customs–Excise)
Indonesia	Directorate of Sea Traffic	KM	Kapal Motor (Motor Vessel)
Imperial Iran	Imperial Iranian Navy	IIS	Imperial Iranian Ship (Persian: ناو شاهنشاهی ایران)
Iran	Islamic Republic of Iran Navy	IRIS	Islamic Republic of Iran ship (Persian: ناو جمهوری اسلامی ایران)
Ireland	Irish Naval Service	LÉ	Long Éireannach (Irish ship)
Ireland	Commissioners of Irish Lights	ILV	Irish Lights Vessel (Lighthouse tender)
Israel	Israeli Sea Corps	IS	Israeli Ship (Internally Hebrew acronym אח"י (A.Ch.Y.) is used standing for אניית חיל הים (Oniyat Heyl HaYam – Sea Corps Ship)
Kingdom of Italy	Regia Marina	RN	Regia Nave – Royal Ship
Kingdom of Italy	Regia Marina	R.Smg.	Regio Sommergibile – Royal Submarine
Italy	Marina Militare	ITS	Italian Ship (NATO designation); Italy no longer uses prefixes
Jamaica	Jamaica Defence Force	HMJS	His Majesty's Jamaican Ship
Empire of Japan	Imperial Japanese Navy	HIJMS (obsolete); IJN (unofficial)	His Imperial Japanese Majesty Ship (used externally, between the Meiji Era and the Washington Naval Treaty. Though abandoned later on, Japanese vessels were still referred as such during World War II. The unofficial name IJN stands for "Imperial Japanese Navy" is frequently used in various sources and media.
Japan	Japan Maritime Self-Defense Force	JDS or JS	Japanese Defense Ship or Japanese Ship
Kenya	Kenyan Navy	KNS	Kenyan Naval Ship
Kiribati	Kiribati Police Force	RKS	Republic of Kiribati Ship
North Korea	Korean People's Navy	(No Official Prefix)	Does not use any prefixes at all, either for international identification or for ship type indication.
Kuwait	Kuwait Naval Force	KNS	Kuwait Navy Ship
Korean Empire	Imperial Korean Navy	KIS	Korean Imperial Ship
South Korea	Republic of Korea Navy	ROKS	Republic of Korea Ship
Latvia	Latvian Navy	LVNS	Latvian Naval Ship (NATO designation)
Lithuania	Lithuanian Navy	LKL	Lietuvos Karinis Laivas (Lithuanian Military Ship)
Lithuania	Lithuanian Navy	LNS	Lithuanian Ship (NATO designation)
Malaysia	Royal Malaysian Navy	KD	Kapal Di-Raja – His Majesty's Ship, literal: Royal Ship.
Malaysia	Royal Malaysian Navy	KLD	Kapal Layar Di-Raja - His Majesty's Sailing Ship, literal: Royal Sailing Ship. (Used by KLD Tunas Samudera)
Malaysia	Malaysian Maritime Enforcement Agency	KM	Kapal Maritim – Maritime Ship
Marshall Islands	Marshall Islands Police	RMIS	Republic of the Marshall Islands Ship
Federated States of Micronesia	FSM National Police	FSM	Federated States of Micronesia
Mexico	Armada de México	ARM	Armada de la República Mexicana (Navy of the Republic of Mexico)
Morocco	Royal Moroccan Navy	RMNS	Royal Moroccan Naval Ship (NATO designation)
Myanmar	Myanmar Navy	UMS	Union of Myanmar Ship (Burmese: Myanmar Sit Yay Yin)
Namibia	Namibian Navy	NS	Namibian Ship
Netherlands	Royal Netherlands Navy	HNLMS (Dutch: Zr.Ms./Hr.Ms.)	His/Her Netherlands Majesty's Ship (Dutch: Zijner/Harer Majesteits)
New Zealand	Royal New Zealand Navy	HMNZS	His/Her Majesty's New Zealand Ship
Nigeria	Nigerian Navy	NNS	Nigerian Naval Ship
Norway	Royal Norwegian Navy	HNoMS (Norwegian: KNM)	His Norwegian Majesty's Ship (Norwegian: Kongelige Norske Marine), in use since 1946.
Norway	Royal Norwegian Navy	HNoMY (Norwegian: KS)	His Norwegian Majesty's Yacht (Norwegian: Kongenskipet). The only vessel with the prefix, HNoMY Norge, is owned by the King but crewed by his Navy since 1948.
Norway	King of Norway	KSJ	King's Sloop Norwegian: Kongesjaluppen Used on two small motorised pleasure vessels named Stjernen & Stjernen (II) owned by the King from 1899-1940 and 1945–present.
Norway	Norwegian Coast Guard	NoCGV (Norwegian: KV)	Norwegian Coast Guard Vessel (Norwegian: Kystvakten)
Oman	Royal Navy of Oman	SNV	Sultanate Naval Vessel
Pakistan	Pakistan Navy	PNS	Pakistan Naval Ship
Pakistan	Pakistan Maritime Security Agency	PMSS	Pakistan Maritime Security Ship
Palau	Palau Police	PSS	Palau State Ship
Papua New Guinea	Papua New Guinea Defence Force	HMPNGS	His/Her Majesty's Papua New Guinea Ship
Paraguay	Paraguayan Navy	ARP	Armada de la República del Paraguay (Navy of the Republic of Paraguay)
Peru	Peruvian Navy	BAP	Peruvian Navy Ship (Spanish: Buque Armada Peruana), Since 1921
Peru	Peruvian Navy	BIC	Scientific Research Ship (Spanish: Buque de Investigación Científica)
Philippines	Philippine Navy, Philippine Coast Guard, Bureau of Fisheries and Aquatic Resources	BRP	Barko ng Republika ng Pilipinas; in use since 1 July 1980 (Ship of the Republic of the Philippines)
Philippines	Philippine Navy, Philippine Coast Guard, Bureau of Fisheries and Aquatic Resources	RPS	Republic of the Philippines Ship (Obsolete); before 1 July 1980
Poland	Polish Navy	ORP	Okręt Rzeczypospolitej Polskiej (Warship of the Republic of Poland)
Portugal	Marinha Portuguesa	NRP	Navio da República Portuguesa (Ship of the Portuguese Republic)
Portugal	Marinha Portuguesa	PNS	Portuguese Navy Ship (NATO designation); never used internally.
Portugal	Marinha Portuguesa	UAM	Unidade Auxiliar da Marinha – Navy Auxiliary Unit (used by non-military ships of Portuguese Navy)
Prussia	Prussian Navy	SMS	Seiner Majestät Schiff (His Majesty's Ship)
Kingdom of Romania	Royal Romanian Navy	NMS	Nava Majestăţii Sale (His/Her Majesty's Ship)
Romania	Romanian Navy	ROS	Romanian Ship (NATO designation); prefixes are for international identification only and never used internally.
Romania	Romanian Navy	SMR	Serviciul Maritim Român (Romanian Maritime Service); used by transport ships
Russian Empire	Imperial Russian Navy	(No Official Prefix)	Some authors use "HIRMS" for "His Imperial Russian Majesty's Ship" to identify them.
Russia	Russian Navy	RFS	Russian Federation Ship (NATO designation; prefixes are for international identification only and never used internally.
Saudi Arabia	Saudi Navy	HMS	His Majesty's Ship (Same as the Royal Navy)
Singapore	Republic of Singapore Navy	RSS	Republic of Singapore Ship
Slovenia	Slovenian Navy	SNS	Slovenian Naval Ship (NATO prefix)
Solomon Islands	Royal Solomon Islands Police	RSIPV	Royal Solomon Islands Police Vessel
South Africa	South African Navy	SAS	South African Ship/Suid-Afrikaanse Skip (previously HMSAS – His/Her Majesty's South African Ship)
South Africa	South African Navy	SATS	South African Training Ship
Soviet Union	Soviet Navy	(No Official Prefix)	Some authors use "USSRS" for "Union of Soviet Socialist Republics Ship" (Russian: Корабль Союза Советских Социалистических Республик).
Spain	Armada Española	ESPS Buque de la A	Spanish Navy Ship (Spain does not use prefixes internally. ESPN or SPS are no longer used)
Sri Lanka	Sri Lankan Navy	SLNS	Sri Lanka Naval Ship
Sri Lanka	Sri Lanka Coast Guard	SLCG	Sri Lanka Coast Guard
Sweden	Swedish Navy	HMS (English: HSwMS)	Hans/Hennes Majestäts Skepp (His/Her Majesty's Ship); HSwMS (His/Her Swedish Majesty's Ship) is used in English to avoid confusion with Royal Navy ships
Sweden	Swedish Coast Guard	KBV	Swedish Coast Guard Vessel (Swedish: Kustbevakningen)
Republic of China (Taiwan)	Republic of China Navy	ROCS	Republic of China Ship; CNS for "Chinese Navy Ship" was used before 1949
Thailand	Royal Thai Navy	HTMS	His Thai Majesty's Ship
Timor-Leste	Timor Leste Defense Force	NRTL	Navio da República de Timor Leste (Ship of the Timor Leste Republic)
Tonga	Tonga Defence Services	VOEA	Vaka O Ene Afio (His Majesty's Vessel)
Turkey	Turkish Navy	TCG	Ship of the Turkish Republic (Turkish: Türkiye Cumhuriyeti Gemisi.)
Tuvalu	Tuvalu Police Force	HMTSS	His/Her Majesty's Tuvalu Surveillance Ship
Trinidad and Tobago	Trinidad and Tobago Defence Force	TTS	Trinidad and Tobago Ship
United Kingdom	Ships carrying mail	RMS	Royal Mail Steamer/Ship
United Kingdom	Cable ship	CS	His/Her Majesty's Telegraph Vessel
United Kingdom	Motor Ship	MS	Motor Ship. Cruise ships such as the MS Queen Elizabeth, which do not carry post
United Kingdom	Fishery protection vessels	FPV	Fisheries Protection Vessel
United Kingdom	Royal Air Force	HMAFV	His/Her Majesty's Air Force Vessel (not currently in use)
United Kingdom	Royal Fleet Auxiliary ships	RFA	Royal Fleet Auxiliary
United Kingdom	Royal Maritime Auxiliary; Service ships	RMAS	Royal Maritime Auxiliary Ship (now obsolete)
United Kingdom	Royal Naval Auxiliary Service	XSV	Auxiliary Service Vessel (now obsolete)
United Kingdom	Royal Navy	HM Sloop	His/Her Majesty's Sloop (now obsolete)
United Kingdom	Royal Navy	HMS	His/Her Majesty's Ship/Submarine
United Kingdom	Royal Navy	HMSm	His/Her Majesty's Submarine (not currently in use)
United Kingdom	Royal Navy	HMT	Hired Military Transport (not currently in use); His/Her Majesty's Transport/Troopship/Trawler/Tug
United Kingdom	Royal Navy	HMAV	His/Her Majesty's Armed Vessel (not currently in use)
United Kingdom	Royal Navy	HMY	His/Her Majesty's Yacht (not currently in use)
United Kingdom	Royal Navy	HMMGB	His/Her Majesty's Motor Gun Boat (not currently in use)
United Kingdom	Royal Navy	HMM	His/Her Majesty's Monitor (not currently in use)
United Kingdom	Royal Navy	HMSML	His/Her Majesty's Survey Motor Launch
United Kingdom	Royal Navy	HBMS	His/Her Britannic Majesty's Ship (archaic)
United Kingdom	Royal Navy	HM	His/Her Majesty's, then used with the type of ship in military use (e.g. "HM Trawler" or "HM Rescue Tug")
United Kingdom	Royal Navy	RNMB	Royal Navy Motor Boat
United Kingdom	Royal Navy	XV	eXperimental Vehicle, introduced with XV Patrick Blackett
United Kingdom	Hospital Ships	HMHS	His/Her Majesty's Hospital Ship
United Kingdom	Joint Services Sail Training Yachts (JSASTC)	HMSTC	His/Her Majesty's Sail Training Craft
United Kingdom	Trinity House	THV	Trinity House Vessel (Lighthouse and Buoy Tender)
United Kingdom	Northern Lighthouse Board	NLV	Northern Lighthouse Vessel (Lighthouse tender)
United Kingdom	Commissioners of Irish Lights	ILV	Irish Lights Vessel (Lighthouse tender)
United Kingdom	British Army	HMAV	His/Her Majesty's Army Vessel
United Kingdom	British Army	RCLV	Royal Corps of Logistics Vessel (not currently in use)
United Kingdom	Government research ships	RRS	Royal Research Ship
United Kingdom	HM Revenue and Customs/Border Force	HMCC, HMC	His/Her Majesty's Customs Cutter shortened to His Majesty's Cutter after being transferred to Border Force
United Kingdom	HM Customs and Excise (replaced by HMRC, above)	HMRC	His/Her Majesty's Revenue Cutter (not used since 18 April 2005). Also His Majesty's Revenue Cruiser (as per HMRC Vigilant 1947. Not used since ca. 1960)
United States	United States Air Force	USAF, USAFS	United States Air Force ship (not currently in use)
United States	United States Army (modern)	USAS	United States Army Ship (modern)
United States	United States Army (modern)	USAV	United States Army Vessel (modern)
United States	United States Army (historical)		
United States	United States Army (historical)	USAT	United States Army Transport (large Army owned bareboat chartered troop or cargo transports, not in use after 1950)
United States	United States Army (historical)	USACT	United States Army Chartered Transport (usage WW I only for time or voyage chartered ships; e.g. Artemis 1917—1919)
United States	United States Army (historical)	USAMP	U.S. Army Mine Planter (not currently in use)
United States	United States Army (historical)	USAJMP	U.S. Army Junior Mine Planter (not currently in use)
United States	United States Army (historical)	U.S. Army	Vessels not otherwise designated: tugs, FS, Q, P etc. (not currently in use)
United States	United States Army (historical)	USAHS	United States Army Hospital Ship (not currently in use)
United States	United States Navy	USF	United States Frigate (obsolete)
United States	United States Navy	USFS	United States Flagship (obsolete)
United States	United States Navy	USS	United States Ship – Commissioned warships only.
United States	United States Navy	USNV	United States Naval Vessel (Small utility vessels, not MSC, operated by local commands)
United States	U.S. Navy Military Sealift Command (MSC)	USNS	United States Naval Ship (USN-owned, civilian crews)
United States	United States Coast Guard	USCGC	United States Coast Guard Cutter
United States	United States Coast Guard	USCGD	United States Coast Guard Destroyer (not currently in use)
United States	National Oceanic and Atmospheric Administration	NOAAS	National Oceanic and Atmospheric Administration Ship
United States	United States Coast and Geodetic Survey	USC&GS	United States Coast and Geodetic Survey (obsolete); occasionally a second "S" for "survey ship" was used
United States	United States Environmental Protection Agency	US EPA	United States Environmental Protection Agency; no "S" for "ship" is used
United States	United States Commission of Fish and Fisheries	USFC	United States Fish Commission (obsolete); commonly used informal name for the Commission; no "S" for "ship" was used
United States	United States Bureau of Fisheries	USFS	United States Fisheries Service (obsolete); alternative informal name for the Bureau; no "S" for "ship" was used
United States	United States Fish and Wildlife Service	US FWS	United States Fish and Wildlife Service; no "S" for "ship" used
United States	United States Lighthouse Service	USLHT	United States Lighthouse Tender (obsolete)
United States	United States Public Health Service	USPHS	United States Public Health Service; no "S" for "ship" used
United States	United States Revenue-Marine (1790–1894) and United States Revenue Cutter Service (1894-1915)	USRC	United States Revenue Cutter (obsolete)
Uruguay	Uruguayan Navy	ROU	República Oriental del Uruguay
Ukraine	Ukrainian Navy	UNS	Ukrainian Navy Ship
Vanuatu	Vanuatu Police Force	RVS	Republic of Vanuatu Ship
Venezuela	Venezuelan Navy	FNV	Fuerzas Navales de Venezuela Not in use since 1949
Venezuela	Venezuelan Navy	ARV	Armada República de Venezuela Not in use 1999
Venezuela	Venezuelan Navy	ARBV	Armada República Bolivariana de Venezuela
Vietnam	Vietnam People's Navy	VPNS	Vietnam People's Navy Ship. The Vietnam People's Navy does not internally and formally use this designation despite its unofficial but frequent usage by foreign media at international events. Since a majority of the Vietnamese fleet is not named literally and only has uniform non-prefixed hull numbers, the VPNS prefix is sometimes used with the ship's hull number (for example, VPNS 20) to make it look cosmetically more synchronous and consistent with other navies' prefixed ship names in international activities.
South Vietnam	Republic of Vietnam Navy	RVNS	Republic of Vietnam Navy Ship or Republic of Viet-Nam Ship (obsolete)
Kingdom of Yugoslavia	Royal Yugoslav Navy	KB	Serbian: Краљевски брод, romanized: Kraljevski brod (English: Royal Ship)
Socialist Federal Republic of Yugoslavia; Federal Republic of Yugoslavia; Serbia and Montenegro	Jugoslovenska Ratna Mornarica JRM (English: Yugoslavia war navy) Yugoslav Navy 1969–1992 Ratna Mornarica Vojske Jugoslavije RМVЈ (English: War navy of Yugoslavia Armed Forces) 1992–2003	RTOP	Raketna Topovnjača or Ракетна Топовњача (English: Rocket gunship), named by Yugoslavia peoples heroes
Socialist Federal Republic of Yugoslavia; Federal Republic of Yugoslavia; Serbia and Montenegro	Jugoslovenska Ratna Mornarica JRM (English: Yugoslavia war navy) Yugoslav Navy 1969–1992 Ratna Mornarica Vojske Jugoslavije RМVЈ (English: War navy of Yugoslavia Armed Forces) 1992–2003	RČ	Raketni Čamac or Ракетни Чамац (English: Rocket boat), 1969–1992, named by Yugoslavia peoples heroes
Socialist Federal Republic of Yugoslavia; Federal Republic of Yugoslavia; Serbia and Montenegro	Jugoslovenska Ratna Mornarica JRM (English: Yugoslavia war navy) Yugoslav Navy 1969–1992 Ratna Mornarica Vojske Jugoslavije RМVЈ (English: War navy of Yugoslavia Armed Forces) 1992–2003	VPBR	Veliki Patrolni Brod or Велики Патролни Брод (English: Big patrol ship), 1969–1992, named by Yugoslavia coastal towns
Socialist Federal Republic of Yugoslavia; Federal Republic of Yugoslavia; Serbia and Montenegro	Jugoslovenska Ratna Mornarica JRM (English: Yugoslavia war navy) Yugoslav Navy 1969–1992 Ratna Mornarica Vojske Jugoslavije RМVЈ (English: War navy of Yugoslavia Armed Forces) 1992–2003	TČ	Torpedni Čamac or Торпедни Чамац (English: Torpedo boat), 1969–1992
Socialist Federal Republic of Yugoslavia; Federal Republic of Yugoslavia; Serbia and Montenegro	Jugoslovenska Ratna Mornarica JRM (English: Yugoslavia war navy) Yugoslav Navy 1969–1992 Ratna Mornarica Vojske Jugoslavije RМVЈ (English: War navy of Yugoslavia Armed Forces) 1992–2003	PČ	Patrolni Čamac or Патролни Чамац (English: Patrol boat), 1969–1992, named by mountains
Socialist Federal Republic of Yugoslavia; Federal Republic of Yugoslavia; Serbia and Montenegro	Jugoslovenska Ratna Mornarica JRM (English: Yugoslavia war navy) Yugoslav Navy 1969–1992 Ratna Mornarica Vojske Jugoslavije RМVЈ (English: War navy of Yugoslavia Armed Forces) 1992–2003	PO	Pomoćni Oružar or Помоћни Оружар (English: Auxiliary аrmourer), 1969–1992
Socialist Federal Republic of Yugoslavia; Federal Republic of Yugoslavia; Serbia and Montenegro	Jugoslovenska Ratna Mornarica JRM (English: Yugoslavia war navy) Yugoslav Navy 1969–1992 Ratna Mornarica Vojske Jugoslavije RМVЈ (English: War navy of Yugoslavia Armed Forces) 1992–2003	RML	Rečni minolovac or Речни миноловац (English: River minesweepers), 1969–1992, named by places of WWII battles
Socialist Federal Republic of Yugoslavia; Federal Republic of Yugoslavia; Serbia and Montenegro	Jugoslovenska Ratna Mornarica JRM (English: Yugoslavia war navy) Yugoslav Navy 1969–1992 Ratna Mornarica Vojske Jugoslavije RМVЈ (English: War navy of Yugoslavia Armed Forces) 1992–2003	RPB	Rečni patrolni brod or Речни патролни брод (English: River patrol boat), 1969–1992
Socialist Federal Republic of Yugoslavia; Federal Republic of Yugoslavia; Serbia and Montenegro	Jugoslovenska Ratna Mornarica JRM (English: Yugoslavia war navy) Yugoslav Navy 1969–1992 Ratna Mornarica Vojske Jugoslavije RМVЈ (English: War navy of Yugoslavia Armed Forces) 1992–2003	P	Podmornica or Подморница (English: Submarine), 1969–1992, named by rivers or human qualities
Socialist Federal Republic of Yugoslavia; Federal Republic of Yugoslavia; Serbia and Montenegro	Jugoslovenska Ratna Mornarica JRM (English: Yugoslavia war navy) Yugoslav Navy 1969–1992 Ratna Mornarica Vojske Jugoslavije RМVЈ (English: War navy of Yugoslavia Armed Forces) 1992–2003	RЕ	Razarač Eskortni or Разарач Ескортни (English: Escort destroyer), 1969–1992
Socialist Federal Republic of Yugoslavia; Federal Republic of Yugoslavia; Serbia and Montenegro	Jugoslovenska Ratna Mornarica JRM (English: Yugoslavia war navy) Yugoslav Navy 1969–1992 Ratna Mornarica Vojske Jugoslavije RМVЈ (English: War navy of Yugoslavia Armed Forces) 1992–2003	PT	Pomoćni transportni or Помоћни транспортни (English: Auxiliary transport), 1969–1992
Socialist Federal Republic of Yugoslavia; Federal Republic of Yugoslavia; Serbia and Montenegro	Jugoslovenska Ratna Mornarica JRM (English: Yugoslavia war navy) Yugoslav Navy 1969–1992 Ratna Mornarica Vojske Jugoslavije RМVЈ (English: War navy of Yugoslavia Armed Forces) 1992–2003	DČ	Desantni čamci or Десантни чамци (English: Landing craft), 1969–1992

=== Prefix conventions ===
The designations for United Kingdom ships applied at the time of the British Empire, before the establishment of separate navies for the Dominions.

In the Royal Netherlands Navy, "HNLMS" is the prefix in English, a translation of the Dutch original "Hr.Ms." or "Zr.Ms.". "Hr.Ms." should preferably not be used in English-language documents; nevertheless it is often seen on the World Wide Web. Until the moment a Dutch naval ship officially enters active service in the fleet, the ship's name is used without the prefix. Since King Willem-Alexander succeeded Queen Beatrix on 30 April 2013, "Hr.Ms." is replaced by "Zr.Ms.".

In Australia, the prefix NUSHIP is used to denote ships that have yet to be commissioned into the fleet.

In the United States, all prefixes other than "USS", "USNS", "USNV", and "USRC" were made obsolete in 1901, when President Theodore Roosevelt issued an Executive order fixing American naval nomenclature. USRC was replaced by USCGC when the Revenue Cutter Service merged with the United States Lifesaving Service to become the United States Coast Guard in 1915. USLHT also was replaced by USCGC when the United States Lighthouse Service became a part of the U.S. Coast Guard in 1939. USC&GS was replaced by NOAAS when the United States Coast and Geodetic Survey merged with other U.S. Government scientific agencies to form the National Oceanic and Atmospheric Administration (NOAA) in 1970. USFC was replaced by USFS when the United States Commission on Fish and Fisheries was reorganized as the U.S. Bureau of Fisheries in 1903, and USFS in turn was replaced in 1940 by US FWS when the Bureau of Fisheries merged with the United States Department of the Interior's Division of Biological Survey to form the Department of the Interior's Fish and Wildlife Service (which in 1956 was reorganized as the United States Fish and Wildlife Service). Seagoing ships Fish and Wildlife Service ships with the prefix US FWS that were transferred to NOAA when NOAA was created in 1970 switched to the NOAAS prefix.

A United States Navy ship that is not in active commission does not hold the title of United States Ship with simply the name without prefix used before and after commissioned service. Vessels, such as yard and harbor craft that are not commissioned and "in service" are officially referred to by name or hull number without prefix. Prior to commissioning, ships may be described as a pre-commissioning unit or PCU; for example, USS Gerald R. Ford was described as the "pre-commissioning unit (PCU) Gerald R. Ford" prior to her commissioning in 2017. Military Sealift Command (MSC) civilian crewed ships "in service" are given the prefix United States Naval Ship (USNS).

When it is stricken from the fleet list, a ship typically has the prefix "ex-" added to its name, to distinguish it from any active ships bearing the same name. For example, after USS Constellation (CV-64) was retired in 2003, she became referred to as ex-Constellation.

== Sources ==
- "Ship naming in the United States Navy". Naval History and Heritage Command. United States Navy. 6 January 2015. Archived from the original on 17 June 2015.
- "Frequently Asked Questions". USCG Historian's Office. Coast Guard History. United States Coast Guard. 5 January 2015. Archived from the original on 17 May 2017.
