= Liftboat =

Type of cargo vessel

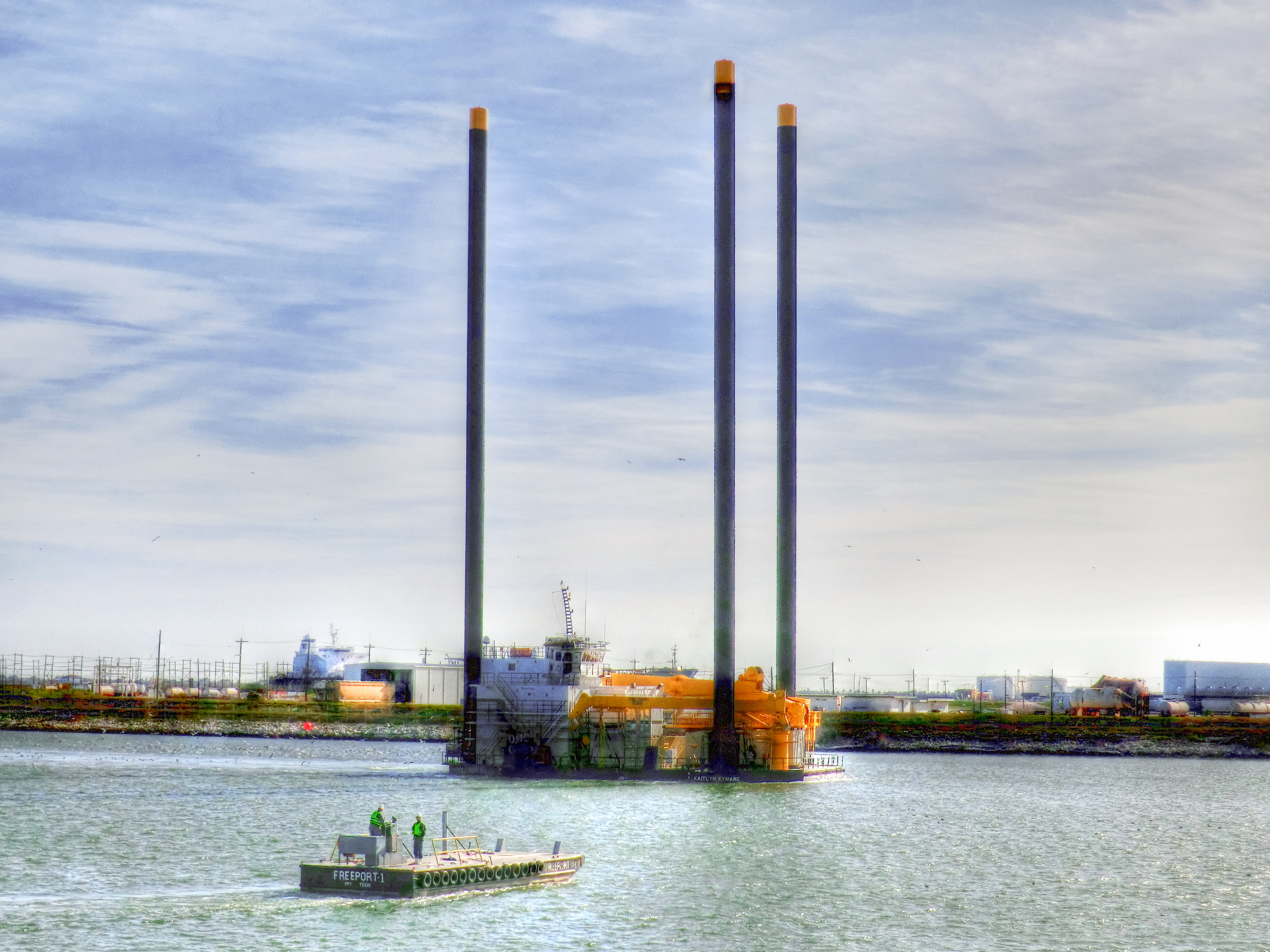
The liftboat Kaitlyn Eymard was built in the United States by Conrad Industries in 2002.

A liftboat is a self-propelled, self-elevating vessel used in support of various offshore mineral exploration and production or offshore construction activities. A liftboat has a relatively large open deck to accommodate equipment and supplies, and the capability of raising its hull clear of the water on its own legs so as to provide a stable platform from which maintenance and construction work may be conducted.

For liftboats registered to the United States, structures and machinery are covered under Title 46 of the Code of Federal Regulations. Liftboats are usually outfitted with at least one crane; marine cranes are usually designed to API specification 2C or the equivalent classification society guidelines.

Liftboats are commonly used to perform maintenance on oil and gas well platforms. They have increasingly been used in constructing offshore wind farms in the United States. The liftboat usually moves on location on a side of the platform where no obstructions or pipelines are observed, lowers its legs and jacks up out of the water. Because the pads of the liftboat are sitting on a muddy, unstable seafloor, most liftboats practice a safety measure called a preload, where the boat jacks-up the absolute minimum to clear hull from the tips of the significant wave heights, fills its holds with water for weight and allows the boat to settle in the mud for several hours before dumping the water and jacking up to work height.

If the mud of the seafloor gives way under the liftboat, it can fall into the water and put the lives of the crew in danger. A complete site survey prior to moving on location is an important safety measure to ensure that all seafloor features (including canholes, which are the depressions left by the legs of drilling rigs or liftboats, and also pipelines) are known before choosing a final location.

== History ==
The first liftboat was designed in 1955 by brothers Lynn and Orin Dean in Violet, Louisiana. In the 1950s the Dean brothers owned a repair service for automobiles and marine and farm equipment called Universal Repair Service, which as of 2018 was known as EBI, Elevating Boats LLC. As of 2018, the company operated 30 liftboats that serviced the shallow water oil and gas industry in the Gulf of Mexico from a liftboat dock in Houma, Louisiana.

Liftboats were initially confined to the Gulf Coast of the United States, where they served oil and gas well platforms. However starting in the early 2000s, U.S. liftboats were contracted to work in overseas markets including Brazil, China, Nigeria, and the United Kingdom.

== Examples ==
=== L/B Robert ===
Montco Offshore's MiNO Marine, LLC–designed L/B Robert has a working water depth of 270 feet (82 m), 15,400 square feet (1,430 m^{2}) of deck area and a 500-ton crane. The legs are 335 feet (102 m) long and it has a main crane and three auxiliary cranes. The vessel uses electro-hydraulic jacking systems, and the cranes are all driven from the segregated machinery spaces.

=== ORCA series of self-elevating platforms ===
The ORCA series of self-propelled, self-elevating platforms was designed by Bennett Offshore working in collaboration with the Offshore Technology Development group of Keppel Offshore & Marine. These SEPs range in size from small platforms designed for use in the Gulf of Mexico to large units up to 115 metres (377 feet) in length capable of installing offshore wind turbines and foundations exceeding 800 tonnes (790 long tons; 130,000 stone). ORCA platforms can be configured for construction support, light drilling, well intervention, well plug and abandonment, coiled tubing operations, wind farm installation, gas compression and accommodation. The first ORCA 2500, customized for use in the Middle East and North Africa, was delivered to a Qatari rig operator in February 2016. As of 2015, an ORCA 3500 was under construction by Keppel FELS for delivery in their fourth quarter of 2017.

=== SUDA 450-L3T ===
The naval architecture firm A. K. Suda, Ltd. designed a 450-foot (137.25m) truss-legged liftboat for Teras Offshore. When delivered in 2014, it was the world's largest liftboat. The molded steel hull dimensions are 60 metres (197 ft) x 54 metres (177 ft) x 6 metres (20 ft), and it is capable of working in water depths up to 367 feet (112 m). It has two deck cranes, one leg encircling around the starboard jackcase, and the other a pedestal crane on the port side of the vessel. Its quarters can accommodate 250 people including crew. It was built by Triyards Marine at Saigon Shipyard in Vietnam.

== Accidents ==
=== Ram XVIII ===
On November 18, 2018, the liftboat Ram XVIII overturned at a location in the Gulf of Mexico about 15 nautical miles (17 mi; 28 km) south-southeast of Grand Isle, Louisiana. Five crew members and 10 offshore workers abandoned ship and were rescued. Three personnel suffered minor injuries, and the accident released an estimated 1,000 US gallons (830 imp gal; 3,800 L) of hydraulic oil into waters of the Gulf of Mexico. The boat was declared a total loss at an estimated cost of $1.14 million.

Ram XVIII was a 215-foot (66 m) liftboat built in 2015 and owned by Aries Marine Corporation of Lafayette, Louisiana. The National Transportation Safety Board (NTSB) determined that the probable cause of the accident was an industry failure of not providing liftboat operators with enough information about composition of the seafloor. The port leg of the liftboat became unstable, leading to collapse, but it remains unclear whether the sea floor washed away, the leg settled quickly in a "punch-through", or the edge of the nearest canhole collapsed.

=== Kristin Faye ===
On September 8, 2019, the liftboat Kristin Faye capsized while servicing an oil platform in the Gulf of Mexico about 18 nautical miles (21 mi; 33 km) east of Venice, Louisiana. The vessel was outfitted with two telescoping boom cranes on her bow. One large-capacity crane was mounted to port and another sat on a pedestal to starboard. The liftboat began listing to port and capsized in about 35 feet (11 m) of water after workers extended one of the cranes. The NTSB report on the accident blamed it on inadequate preload procedures that failed to account for shifting and loading the crane.

Three crew members were evacuated and one was slightly injured during evacuation. The accident released about 120 US gallons (100 imp gal; 450 L) of diesel fuel into the Gulf of Mexico. The vessel was declared a total loss at a cost of $750,000. Salvage divers reported that the port leg of the liftboat had penetrated about 40 feet (12 m) into the sea floor in a punch-through.

=== Seacor Power ===
On April 13, 2021, the United States Coast Guard responded to reports of a 234-foot (71.3 m) commercial lift vessel in distress 8 nautical miles (9.2 mi; 15 km) south of Port Fourchon, Louisiana, and along with good Samaritan vessels, began rescue operations. The owner identified the liftboat as Seacor Power, belonging to the firm Seacor Marine, and under hire at the time of the accident by the oil and gas company Talos Energy to transport equipment to its oil platform.

The ship was about 7 nautical miles (8.1 mi; 13 km) into a voyage from Port Fourchon to an oil platform on the other side of Louisiana's Mississippi River Delta. It was operated by Seacor crew members and had nine service hands on board. The vessel capsized after an unnamed Category 1 hurricane raised 70 to 80 mph (110 to 130 km/h) winds and rough seas. Six crew members were rescued on the same day from the water. Captain David Ledet, age 63, of Thibodaux, Louisiana, remained in the wheelhouse calling "mayday" even though the vessel was in trouble; he stayed at his post and continued seeking help for his crew, and later was found dead. On April 16, the body of a second crew member was recovered 33 nautical miles (38 mi; 61 km) from the capsized liftboat, leaving 11 people still missing.

== Nomenclature ==
Liftboats go by several names in the marine industry, such as:

- Liftboat – used by United States Coast Guard (USCG) & American Bureau of Shipping (ABS)
- MOU (Mobile Offshore Unit) – used by Lloyds Register; but also incorporates other types of vessel like drill ships and semi-submersible drilling rigs that might not necessarily be self-propelled
- SESV (Self-Elevating Support Vessel) – used by owner/operator GMS
- MPSEP (Multi-Purpose Self-Elevating Platform) – used by owner/operator Seafox and shipyard Keppel
- SEWOP (Self-Elevating Work-Over Platform) – used by owner/operator Halliburton and oil company Chevron
- SEP (Self-Elevating Platform) – used by Naval Architect GustoMSC and Bennett Offshore
- Jack-Up Barge – used in the Gulf of Mexico prior to USCG regulation as a marine vessel
- Jack-Up - used by UK Renewable (ex. BWEA); not necessarily self-propelled
- Wind-Farm Installation Vessel – used generally in the renewables industry; not necessarily self-propelled
- SEAPUP (Self Elevating And Propulsion Utility Platform) - used by ARCO, BP, and Pertamina in the western Java Sea.
