= Pre-Commissioning Unit =

Designation by the United States Navy

Pre-commissioning unit (PRECOMUNIT or PCU) is a designation used by the United States Navy to describe vessels under construction prior to their official commissioning. For example, prior to her commissioning, USS Gerald R. Ford (CVN 78) had been described by the Navy as "PCU Gerald R. Ford (CVN 78)". Such descriptions can appear in the media as well. "PCU" is a temporary, descriptive term, and is not a ship prefix or a part of the ship's official name. Until they are commissioned, U.S. Navy vessels are officially identified by their given name and hull number, such as Gerald R. Ford (CVN 78).

A "PCU" is also the entity that the ships staff is assigned to for training while the ship is being constructed and fitted-out. Prior to reporting to the ship, sailors will report to a PCU at one of two fleet training centers, located at either Naval Station Norfolk or Naval Base San Diego.

== See also ==
- List of current United States Navy ships
