= Marta Mulkins =

Canadian naval officer

Commodore Marta Mulkins OMM CD
- Born: April 23, 1967 (age 59); Brockville, ON
- Spouse: Rear-Admiral Jeffrey Zwick
- Military career
- Allegiance: Canada
- Branch: Royal Canadian Navy
- Service years: 1985–present
- Rank: Rear-Admiral
- Commands: Commander of the Naval Reserve (2015-2018); Naval Reserve Regional Captain - Central Region (2014-2015); HMCS Carleton (2013); HMCS Scotian (2008); HMCS Kingston (2003)

Commodore Marta Mulkins, OMM, CD is a Canadian Forces Naval Reserve officer. Mulkins began her career in the Naval Reserve through a Summer Youth Employment Program (SYEP) at HMCS Donnacona. Originally joined as a Diesel Mechanic she later attended Junior Leadership Training at Canadian Forces Fleet School Esquimalt and was promoted to Naval Cadet in 1988.

Mulkins would later go on to serve many positions on various Canadian Ships. Eventually, she came into command of the Canadian minor warship HMCS Kingston in 2003, becoming the first woman to do so.

In 2015, Mulkins was appointed as Commander of the Naval Reserve.

== Awards and decorations ==
Mulkins's personal awards and decorations include the following:

Ribbon	Description	Notes
	Order of Military Merit (OMM)	Appointed Officer (OMM) on 10 November 2016
	South-West Asia Service Medal	with AFGHANISTAN Clasp
	Queen Elizabeth Diamond Jubilee Medal	Decoration awarded in 2012; Canadian version
	Canadian Forces' Decoration (CD)	with two Clasp for 32 years of services

Military offices
Preceded by David W. Craig	Commander of the Naval Reserve; 2015–2018	Succeeded by Michael Hopper
