= Michael Hopper =

Canadian Forces officer

- Born: March 1969 (age 57); Ottawa, Ontario, Canada
- Military career
- Allegiance: Canada
- Branch: Royal Canadian Navy
- Service years: 1986–present
- Rank: Commodore
- Commands: HMCS Carleton; HMCS Summerside
- Awards: Order of Military Merit; Canadian Forces' Decoration

Michael Hopper OMM CD (born March 1969) is a Canadian Forces officer who served as commander of the Naval Reserve from July 29, 2018 until 2021. Hopper holds the rank of commodore in the Royal Canadian Navy and also works as a teacher with the Ottawa-Carleton District School Board (OCDSB).

== Background ==
Hopper was born in Ottawa, Ontario in March 1969 and first joined the Primary Reserves in 1986 when he was 17 as a cook at HMCS Carleton. He transferred to HMCS Scotian in Halifax while attending Dalhousie University. Hopper moved back to Ottawa, where he earned his bachelor of arts (BA) and bachelor of education (BEd) from the University of Ottawa in 1996 and began working with the OCDSB.

Hopper served in a number of staff positions at HMCS Carleton and in December 2001 served as the commanding officer of the Coastal Defence Vessel HMCS Summerside until December 2002, where he took part in a trip to the Arctic Circle, meant to reinforce Canadian sovereignty in Northern Canada. He was appointed Carleton's executive officer and served as the commanding officer from 2009 to 2013. He was promoted to commander following his time at Carleton and served in a number of positions at National Defence Headquarters (NDHQ) until his promotion to commodore and appointment as the commander of the Naval Reserve on July 28, 2018. While commanding the Naval Reserve, Hopper is on leave from his job as the special education teacher at Elmdale Public School, and lives in Ottawa with his wife and their two children.

== Awards and decorations ==
Hopper's personal awards and decorations include the following:

Ribbon	Description	Notes
	Order of Military Merit (OMM)	Appointed Officer (OMM) on 4 October 2018
	Queen Elizabeth Diamond Jubilee Medal	Decoration awarded in 2012; Canadian version
	Canadian Forces' Decoration (CD)	with one Clasp for 22 years of services

Military offices
Preceded by Marta Mulkins	Commander Naval Reserve; 2018 – 2021	Succeeded by P.J. Montgomery
