= HMCS Prevost =

Coordinates: 42.98010°N 81.25771°W

- Active: 1938–present
- Country: Canada
- Branch: Royal Canadian Navy
- Type: Naval Reserve division
- Role: Reserve unit
- Size: Approximately 180 sailors
- Part of: Canadian Forces Naval Reserve
- Garrison/HQ: London, Ontario
- Motto: By valour not deception
- Anniversaries: Battle of the Atlantic
- Equipment: Various types of inboard and outboard rigid-hull inflatable boats (RHIBs).

Commanders
- Commanding officer: Cdr Janet Lang
- Executive officer: LCdr Devin Gillis
- Coxswain: CPO2 Lee Trotter

His Majesty's Canadian Ship (HMCS) Prevost (/ˈpriːvoʊ/) is a Canadian Forces Naval Reserve Division (NRD) located in London, Ontario. Dubbed a stone frigate, HMCS Prevost is a land-based naval establishment for training part-time sailors as well as functioning as a local recruitment centre for the Royal Canadian Navy (RCN). Prevost reserve sailors serve on all classes of ship on both coasts and the Great Lakes and have served on many occasions overseas on UN and NATO tours of duty, along with harbour defence units.

== Current ==
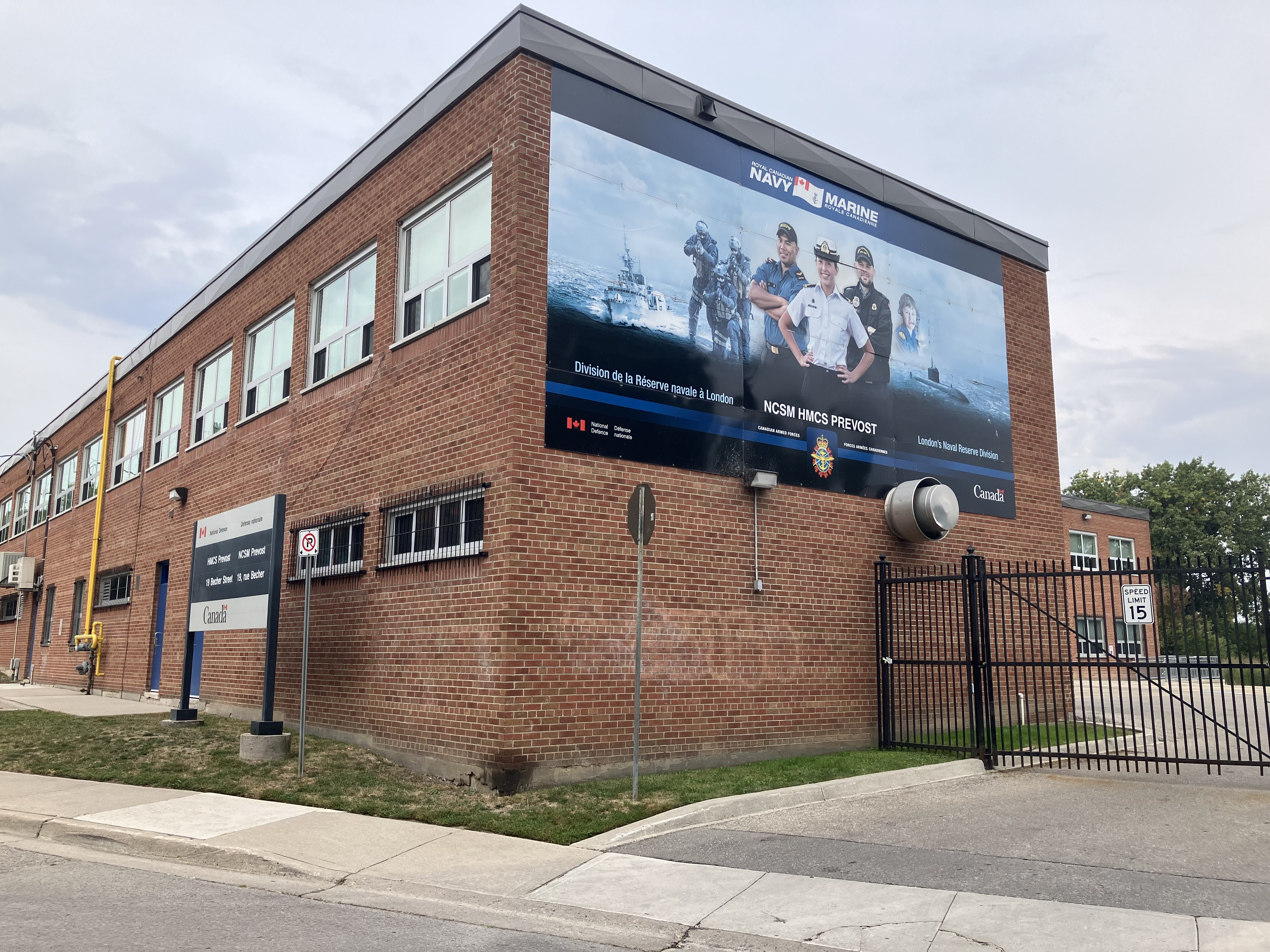
HMCS Prevost in London, Ontario in 2025

Today, HMCS Prevost is home to just under 180 naval reservists and generates trained individuals and teams for the Royal Canadian Navy's domestic and international operations, while at the same time supporting the Canadian Armed Forces efforts to connect with Canadians through the maintenance of a broad national presence.

HMCS Prevost is properly referred to as a ship, since it has been officially christened as His Majesty's Canadian Ship. Since the ship is part of the reserves the majority of its sailors do not operate on a full-time basis, though there is a small staff that does.

The ship also hosts, in its wardroom, regular meetings of Fanshawe Yacht Club when the Upper Thames River Conservation Authority facility at Fanshawe Lake is closed for the winter.

In 2015, a Prevost reservist diver photographed himself on an ice floe, which the commander called "a stupid human trick", causing an international controversy.

== History ==
=== 1938 ===
London Division Royal Canadian Naval Volunteer Reserve (RCNVR) was organized following a visit in July by Commander E. R. Mainguy, RCN. Authority for this decision was received together with the appointment of E. E. Hart in command, as a lieutenant, 8 August 1938. The division was to consist of a half ship's company – 6 officers and 45 men. Quarters for the division were situated on the second floor of the Darch Building on Talbot Street, and the Market Square was used for parade ground activities.

=== 1939–1945 ===
After the outbreak of war, and the apparent inadequacy of the quarters, a move was made on 15 November 1939, to the Carling Block at Richmond and Carling streets, a property which had been vacated by the Postal Department upon completion of the Federal Building.

The decision, in 1941, to create independent commands in all shore establishments, brought about the search for appropriate names. As all naval divisions were affected, and to perpetuate names of ships that had served naval forces, but whose names were not currently allocated, it was decided to rename the division, for the most part, after ships that had served on the Great Lakes during the War of 1812. HMCS Prevost, named after HMS Lady Prevost, a schooner brig serving with the Royal Navy's Lake Erie squadron, so named in honour of the wife of Sir George Prevost, the then Governor General of Canada and Commander-in-Chief, of the British Forces in North America. The commissioning pennant was hoisted on 1 November 1941.

In the interest of operational efficiency, the Royal Canadian Navy had to employ a common language, English, since the majority of its members were English-speaking. Canadians speaking only French were recruited, but their inadequate knowledge of English, produced high percentages of failures among the French-speaking recruits. In the summer of 1941 an English language course was established at HMCS Montcalm at Quebec City, Quebec. Little progress was made, however, and in 1943 the school was transferred to HMCS Prevost. The naval schoolmasters were professional language teachers, and the ratings were quartered with English-speaking families in the city. At the end of a three-month course the men were returned to their respective divisions for further training and subsequent draft to HMCS Cornwallis. The school was moved to HMCS Cornwallis in January 1945.

Another facet of training during this time was that of civilians interested in the Navy generally but particularly in HMCS Prevost. Many were instructed in navigation by Alexander H. Jeffery, Q.C. and Professor R.L. Allen of the University of Western Ontario, together with the co-operation of J. Gordon Thompson in the use of his yacht. During the period of hostility of World War II, HMCS Prevost enrolled 4,480 officers, ratings and members of the Women's Royal Naval Service ("Wrens") into the Royal Canadian Navy.

The Commodore Walter Hose Efficiency Trophy was won by HMCS Prevost, under the command of Lieutenant-Commander J.R. Hunter RCNVR in 1941 and 1942 and again in 1943 and became permanent property of the division.

=== 1946–1950 ===
At the close of hostilities, HMCS Prevost was converted from a wartime establishment to a permanent naval division. Specialized training equipment, including gunnery, ASDIC, radar, communication, seamanship and engineering was installed and recruiting commenced. Permanent force staff officers and supply officers together with their staff were appointed to assist with the administration and specialized training.

For practical training in seamanship, two 14-metre (46 ft) harbour craft, one 7.6-metre (25 ft) diesel motor boat, one 9.8-metre (32 ft) cutter, two 7.9-metre (26 ft) whalers and one 4.3-metre (14 ft) Admiralty dinghy were placed in commission at Port Stanley, Ontario. In August 1949 one 34-metre (112 ft) Fairmile motor launch, HMCS Racoon, converted to diesel power, replaced the two harbour craft.

In October 1950 the boathouse property, situated immediately south of the lift bridge on the west side of the harbour at Port Stanley, was acquired. The following year a building was moved from the Royal Canadian Air Force (RCAF) Station at Fingal, Ontario and erected at the new site. A flag mast, two sets of davits, a crane and other items for seamanship training were provided and the property fenced in.

=== 1953–1955 ===
Naval Headquarters decided, in 1952, to re-activate the competition for efficiency. A silver replica of the Destroyer-Escort class was donated by Vice Admiral H. T. W. Grant and a system of assessment was prepared and promulgated to all naval divisions. A second trophy was also activated for the presentation to the Division next in line and was known as the Runner Up trophy.

HMCS Prevost, under the command of Commander E.G. Bride, RCNR won the Efficiency Trophy for the training year 1953–1954 and tied with HMCS Chippawa for the 1954–1955 training year.

=== 1957 ===
After eighteen years in the Carling Block, and many attempts to secure new and better quarters, a new construction program was launched in February 1956, and on 30 July 1957 the new building at the forks of the Thames River was accepted from the contractors, the ensign hoisted and the move from the Carling Block undertaken. On 23 November 1957 the building was officially opened by the Minister of National Defence, Honourable George R. Pearkes, V.C., assisted by Commodore A.H.G. Storrs, RCN, Rear Admiral K.F. Adams, RCN, Mayor Ray Dennis and the Rev. R.H. McColl, RCNR.

=== 1959–1963 ===
HMCS Prevost under the command of Captain G.A. MacLachlan RCNR won the Runner Up Trophy for the 1958–1959 training season and again for the 1961–1962 period.

=== 1964 ===
Late in 1963, the Minister of National Defence announced a drastic curtailment of expenditures for defence purposes. Among economies to be effected was the closing of six Naval Reserve divisions. Among those six, was HMCS Prevost.

The paying off of the land-locked stone frigate, the reality of service integration as the building was turned over to the Western Ontario Area Command Headquarters for the use of Army militia units.

=== 1977–1988 ===
Prevost detachment office stood up in A Block CFB London in 1977. Staffing, and recruiting began again to enroll personnel for Prevost detachment. Bob Leckie came out of retirement to recruit and manage the detachment office in "A" block at CFB London. During the early 1980s the Naval Reserve detachment continued to grow in London. Within three years Prevost grew to 45 personnel. It was called the Prevost detachment of HMCS Star located in Hamilton, Ontario. Star performed most administrative functions for the detachment. Chief Petty Officer Bill Ross was the full-time chief administrator for the growing unit. Initially only marine engineers were recruited as the Naval Reserve had a shortage at the time. These Prevost engineers, once trained, were used to augment many other units on their training weekends on board various ships on either coast.

=== 1988–2009 ===
Prevost detachment moved from CFB London A Block to its present location, Prevost armories on Becher Street then home to 22 Service Battalion and 4 RCR, and the decision to recommission Prevost as a Naval Reserve division of Maritime Command was made. HMCS Prevost was recommissioned as a Naval Reserve division of Maritime Command on 29 September, 1990 by Vice Admiral C.M. Thomas, the Vice Chief of the Defence Staff.

Freedom of the city was granted to HMCS Prevost under the command of Lieutenant-Commander M. Hoare by Mayor Diane Haskett on 31 October 1998. In October 1998, the war memorial to Prevost sailors lost at sea was repatriated to the division from St Paul's Anglican Cathedral of London, Ontario, where it had been safeguarded since 1964. The Engineering trade lost its traditional place as the largest division at Prevost in 2002, when the Operations department displaced it. Prevost adopted a new motto, "By Valour not Deception".

== Battle of the Atlantic Memorial ==
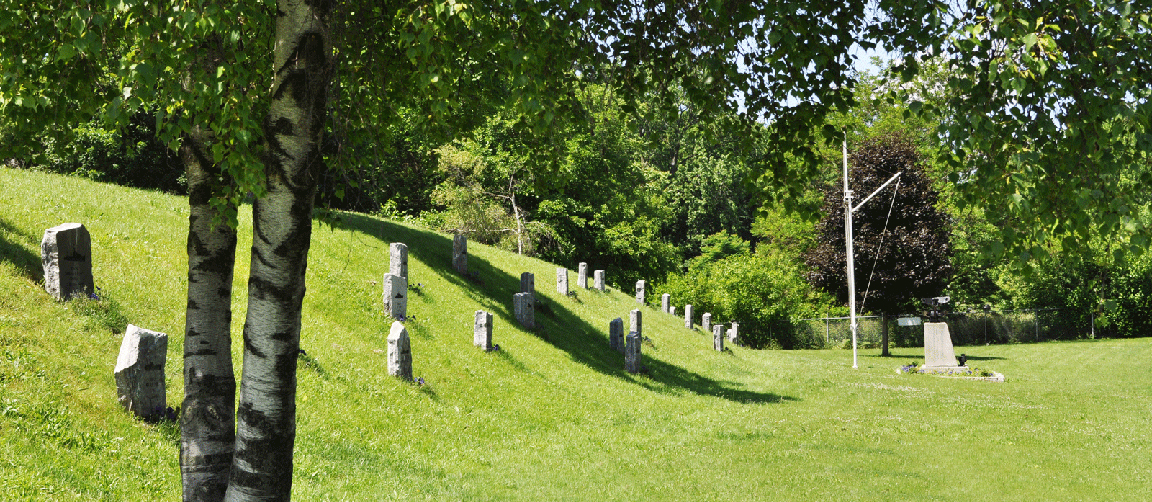
Battle of the Atlantic Memorial

On 2 May 2010, the Battle of the Atlantic Memorial was dedicated at HMCS Prevost. The memorial consists of 25 quarter-tonne stones that are one metre (3 ft 3 in) in height, resembling a tombstone. Twenty-four of the stones are engraved with a Royal Canadian Navy ship lost in the battle, creating a sort-of convoy of ships, with the 25th stone dedicated to the sailors from the Merchant Navy who were lost.

The stones are placed along a 200-metre (660 ft) hillside behind HMCS Prevost's building at 19 Becher Street, facing out towards the Thames River, forming a timeline of the battle with each one placed according to the date when the ships were lost at sea, beginning with HMCS Fraser, sunk on 25 June 1940, and ending with HMCS Esquimalt, sunk on 16 April 1945. The site was upgraded in 2017, with the addition of proper walkways around the site for the ease of those with mobility issues.
