= Admiral Bennett =

Admiral Bennett may refer to:

- Andrew Carl Bennett (1889–1971), U.S. Navy rear admiral
- Chris Bennett (admiral) (born 1937), South African Navy rear admiral
- Jennifer Bennett (fl. 1990s–2010s), Canadian Forces Naval Reserve rear admiral
- Paul Bennett (Royal Navy officer) (fl. 1980s–2020s), British Royal Navy vice admiral
