= HMCS Star =

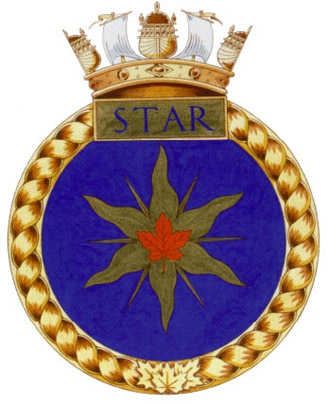
- Active: 1923 to present
- Country: Canada
- Branch: Royal Canadian Navy
- Type: Naval Reserve Division
- Role: Reserve unit
- Size: Approx. 250
- Part of: Canadian Forces Naval Reserve
- Garrison/HQ: 650 Catharine St N, Hamilton, Ontario L8L 4V7
- Motto: Diligentia (Diligence)
- Colours: Royal Blue and Gold
- Anniversaries: Battle of the Atlantic; Established - 15 March 1923
- Equipment: Various types of inboard and outboard rigid-hull inflatable boats
- Decorations: Canadian Forces War of 1812 Commemorative Banner
- Battle honours: Dover, 1652; Martinique, 1809; Guadeloupe, 1810

Commanders
- Commanding Officer: Commander Kevin Ng

HMCS Star is a Canadian Forces Naval Reserve Division (NRD) located in Hamilton, Ontario. Dubbed a stone frigate, HMCS Star is a land-based naval establishment for training part-time sailors as well as functioning as a local recruitment centre for the Royal Canadian Navy (RCN). The second oldest of 24 naval reserve divisions located in major cities across Canada, Star was stood up on 15 March 1923 as the Royal Canadian Naval Volunteer Reserve (RCNVR) Hamilton Half Company and then on 1 November 1941 as HMCS Star.

== Namesake ==
Named after HMS Lord Melville/Star, the Royal Navy 14-gun brig launched at Kingston, Ontario, on 20 July 1813, the name Star honours the Royal Navy's presence on Lake Ontario and the defense of Canada during the War of 1812.

== History ==
=== Early history (1800s) ===
Naval activity in Hamilton Harbour can be traced as far back as the late 18th and early 19th century when HMS Lord Melville, later HMS Star, of the British Provincial Marine and Royal Navy plied Lake Ontario conducting coastal protection operations.

During the Rebellions of 1837, a naval militia from Hamilton led by Canadian loyalist Sir Allan McNab and Royal Navy Captain Andrew Drew, ignited a diplomatic crisis known as the Caroline Affair, when a group of Hamiltonians captured the Canadian rebel supply vessel, SS Caroline, allegedly killing an American crew member and then setting fire to the ship before sending it over Niagara Falls. The Caroline Affair led to the legal principle of the "Caroline test" which states that the necessity for [self-defense] must be "instant, overwhelming, and leaving no choice of means, and no moment for deliberation". Today, the "Caroline test" remains a part of customary international law.

The Militia Act of 1855 authorized the formation of Volunteer Marine Companies within the Province of Canada. Fearing invasion from the United States, seven years later on 31 January 1862, the Hamilton Volunteer Naval Company was stood up under the command of Captain Thomas Harbottle and Lieutenant George P. Malcomson.

With the American Civil War ending, in 1866 the Hamilton Naval Brigade was called out on short periods of active duty guarding the city and manning steamboats in response to Fenian cross-border raids. For their service during the Fenian Raids, Hamilton's naval volunteers were awarded the Canada General Service Medal with the Fenian Raid 1866 bar. Two years later, with the passage of a Militia Act of 1868, the Naval Companies of Garden Island, Toronto, Hamilton, Dunnville and Port Stanley were requested to signal their intention to remain in active service. All the units, including Hamilton, failed to meet the February 1869 deadline and therefore Hamilton's first, formal naval reserve unit ceased to exist.

=== First World War (1914–1918) ===
When the Royal Canadian Navy was formed on 4 May 1910, there was no corresponding naval reserve until 1914 when the Royal Navy Canadian Volunteer Reserve (RNCVR) was stood up with minimal government support. Two years later, in 1916, the Hamilton Committee was formed to recruit sailors for the overseas division new RNCVR. The Committee included well known Hamiltonians, such as Hamilton city Alderman Captain George J. Guy and John H. Collinson, the first headmaster of Highfield School for Boys.

=== Between the wars (1923–1939) ===
On 31 January 1923, Privy Council Order #139 established the Royal Canadian Naval Volunteer Reserve (RCNVR) and on 15 March 1923 Lieutenant Ralph H. Yeates was appointed as the first commanding officer of the Hamilton Half Company (RCNVR). The Half Company initially shared offices with the Navy League in the Imperial Building on the corner of Main Street East & Hughson Street South in Hamilton. On 2 November 1923, the Half Company moved into the W. Grant Sail Loft on the corner of Bay Street North and Burlington Streets, sharing its building with Sea Cadets who had been formed six years earlier. On 2 July 1935, the Hamilton Half Company moved to the Williamson & Company Vinegar Works building at 41 Stuart Street, between Bay & MacNab where it stayed until 1943.

=== Second World War (1939–1945) ===
On 1 November 1941, the Hamilton Half Company was commissioned as HMCS Star and became a major recruiting depot and wartime training barracks for the Royal Canadian Navy and the Women's Royal Canadian Naval Service (WRCNS). As late as 14 October 1941, the unit was considered to be called HMCS Brant, but the name was changed, likely to avoid confusion with a recently launched corvette HMCS Brantford.

On 7 May 1942 it was announced by the Navy that each major naval reserve unit would help meet the growing demand for technically skilled sailors within the fleet by training personnel in specialist skills. Shifting from a purely recruiting role and now to one of specialist training, Star was assigned to train new sailors in radio and electrical engineering. With that, 130 young men from across Canada were assigned to Hamilton and their training was divided between Star, Westdale Technical School (radio work) and Hamilton Technical Institute (electrical engineering). Due to the large complement of sailors at Star, a full medical and dental service was added to the unit.

In the winter of 1942, the University Naval Training Division (UNTD) concept was introduced in Hamilton by Professor A. W. "Jack" Baker, when he stood up an experimental reserve training division at the Ontario Agricultural College (OAC) in Guelph. Attached to HMCS Star for the school term, Baker aimed to establish other Naval Training Units at universities across Canada to secure recruits who will otherwise enter the army's Canadian Officers Training Corps (COTC) or the air force's University Air Training Plan (UATP).

In February 1943, with the success of the UNTD in Guelph, Professor Baker was brought into the RCNVR as an Acting Lieutenant Commander (SB) and appointed to the position of Staff Officer University Naval Training at McMaster University in Hamilton. Under Naval Order 2854 dated 19 June 1943, Baker set out across the country to establish 15 UNTDs. By the time the UNTD program was shut down in 1968, over 7,800 reserve officers were commissioned, of which 500 had trained at Star; and of whom 53 lost their lives during the Second World War.

On 1 February 1943, the Department of National Defence purchased 2.04 hectares (5.0 acres) near Eastwood Park from the City of Hamilton to accommodate the growing unit. On 24 April 1943, the foundations were laid for a new HMCS Star building, with the opening occurring six months later. Intended as a prototype for Naval Reserve structures, the building demonstrated good craftsmanship and handling of materials. At this time, HMCS Star had a strength of approximately one thousand personnel with 681 in trades training, 281 undergoing basic training and 56 officers.

Between 1941 and 1945, HMCS Star enlisted and trained 7,490 officers, men, and women for service during the Second World War. The Distinguished Service Medal was awarded to Chief Petty Officer Donald Portree, Torpedoman Dan Gearing and Signaller Eugine Tobin.

=== Cold War (1945–1989) ===
Following the Second World War, HMCS Star returned to a peacetime footing, reactivating in October 1946 as a reserve division.

In June 1949, a party of sailors from the unit made a visit to former RCN corvettes being readied to be scrapped at Hamilton's steel mills. Their visit was to salvage whatever material would be of instructional value to the Division and to bring back memories to those that served on the ships during the war. In the same month the wardroom at Star was the first wardroom in the Royal Canadian Navy to be fitted with a television receiver, with programs coming in from as far as Buffalo, New York.

In July 1949, a training programme for naval reserve air maintenance personnel was announced to be opened at HMCS Star. The program featured specialist training and instruction in naval aircraft maintenance for 100 personnel. Full training equipment, including Supermarine Seafire aircraft was provided by RCN Air Station, HMCS Shearwater, with training being conducted in addition to the normal week-day drill.

In August 1949, HMCS Star provided a Fairmile-B class motor launch, two harbour craft, a cutter and two whalers to Exercise "Operation Seahorse" carried out in the Burlington Beach area. This navy, army and air force reserve exercise included transferring Royal Canadian Army Service Corps personnel and supplies from boats to amphibious DUKWs and then to shore while under aerial attack. The ships from Star succeeded in landing the army force, while Air Force reserve pilots conducted low level strafing attack and flour bag "bombardment" on the attackers. Earlier that same year, HMCS Star personnel aboard HMCS Portage participated in a similar inter-service assault landing exercise at Port Stanley, Ontario.

In January 1950, the HMCS Star Boxing Club was formed from the ship's company and the Hamilton Sea Cadet corps. The club staged fights with bouts between the Star crew and fighters from the Ontario Agricultural College of Guelph and Shamrock Athletic Club of Hamilton. During the same year, HMCS Star operationalized its first radar set conducting training and tracking ships entering and exiting Hamilton Harbour.

In June 1950, the unit sent its Fairmile-B class motor launch, PTC 706, to partake in exercise "Operation Beaver", a tri-service reserve beach assault manoeuvre at Port Stanley, Ontario. The exercise involved land units, including the Elgin Regiment, Kent Regiment, Essex Fusiliers and the Windsor Essex Scottish Regiment; sea units, including PTC 779 from HMCS Prevost, PTC 762 from HMCS Hunter and PTC 706 from HMCS Star; and 11 aircraft from the No. 420 City of London Auxiliary Squadron, Royal Canadian Air Force (RCAF). During that same summer, PTC 706 spent weekends away from Star conducting various evolutions and making Ports of call to Port Dalhousie, Toronto, Youngstown, Cobourg, and Rochester, New York. In mid-August 1950, PTC 706 joined the minesweeper HMCS Portage and other Fairmiles from Toronto and Kingston for fleet manoeuvres off Presq'ile.

In November 1950, when hurricane winds caused by the Great Appalachian Storm struck the head of Lake Ontario and waves washed away lake shore cottages from Van Wagners beach, approximately 50 officers and sailors from Star and UNTD Guelph were amongst the first to respond as rescue crews. The sailors filled and placed heavy sandbags on temporary dikes, rigged lifelines and helped in other ways. In the midst of the rescue operation, the sailors were recalled to the unit to rescue three Fairmiles (PTC 706, PTC 721 and PTC 761), turned over to a Hamilton yard for winter storage, that had broken their lines.

In 1951, a new reserve summer Great Lakes Training Scheme was set up to provide basic naval training on the Great Lakes for new recruits and officers. Administered by the commanding officer of HMCS Prevost, Commander F.R.K. Naften, the program was conceived to provide seagoing experience for men of the RCN(R) who have not completed the six-month new entry training program. Before being sent to ships and fleet establishments, until they were considered sufficiently trained, the new scheme was intended to give new sailors the experience they needed on the Great Lakes. With six motor launches at his disposal, the new Reserve Training Commander Great Lakes called upon PTCs from HMCS Star, York, Cataraqui, Prevost, Hunter and Griffin to form the "Fairmile Flotilla". From 16 to 17 June, the flotilla conducted its first task, "Operation Beaver II", a 1,700 reserve troop tri-service amphibious landing and airdrop exercise at Erieau. Prior to the amphibious landing of nearly 500 army troops on three beaches from the Fairmiles, PTC 716 from York laid a smokescreen and paratroopers from the 1st Battalion, Royal Canadian Regiment captured an airfield at nearby Chatham to allow friendly air support. Buzzing the "enemy" craft and ground troops with flour bags, a squadron of Harvard and Mustang aircraft, from No. 420 City of London Auxiliary Squadron, RCAF took on the role of enemy air forces. After the successful exercise, the flotilla spent the rest of the summer conducting other sailing activities and evolutions on Lake Ontario, Lake Huron, and Lake Superior before returning to their units.

In 1954, HMCS Star, stood up a sub-unit (tender) located in Kitchener, Ontario for just over ten years from 1 June 1954 until 30 November 1964. During its short existence, the tender's location moved from the former Canadian Women's Army Corps (CWAC) Training Base at Knollwood Park, then co-locating with the Royal Highland Fusiliers of Canada and finally to a fabric factory at 130 Weber Street West. Numbering 95 sailors in 1956, the detachment grew to 114 personnel by 1957. If the detachment was to become an actual Naval Reserve Division, discussions were that it would be named after the former World War II WRCNS training facility in Galt, CONESTOGA. Reductions in defence spending resulted in the closing the Kitchener tender in 1964.

In 1952, HMCS Star's importance as a naval training facility was bolstered by the establishment of the Great Lakes Training Centre (Fleet School Hamilton), making Hamilton the summer home to thousands of naval reservists from all over Canada.

In 1953, HMCS Star gained another neighbour, HMCS Patriot, another stone frigate transplanted from Halifax, Nova Scotia. Established now in Hamilton, HMCS Patriot housed the Commanding Officer, Naval Divisions (COND), the forerunner to today's Royal Canadian Naval Reserve Command Headquarters. Previously based in Toronto during the Second World War under the title Commanding Officer, Reserve Divisions (CORD), COND now supervised 21 naval divisions across Canada and directed the summer operations of the Great Lakes fleet reserve training ships, HMCS Porte St. Louis, HMCS Porte St. Jean, and former air force supply vessel HMCS Scatari, permanently stationed at HMCS Star for use by the reservists.

In 1953, a Naval Reserve Air Squadron (No. 1 Training Air Group) was established at HMCS York in Toronto sending HMCS Star one Hawker Hurricane and two Supermarine Seafire aircraft to be housed at RCAF Station Hamilton, now known as the John C. Munro Hamilton International Airport. Not given its own squadron, due to its close proximity to Toronto, the crew from HMCS Star maintained a support unit for ground crew and maintenance conducting joint training with HMCS York at RCAF Station Downsview in Toronto.

With the unification of the Canadian Armed Forces in the mid-1960s, significant changes came to HMCS Star. In 1964, The Great Lakes Training Centre was disbanded, as was the naval air arm maintenance unit. In 1967, The Hamilton Service Battalion and The Hamilton Medical Company, later renamed 23 Service Battalion and 23 Medical Company, took over HMCS Patriot /COND building after the closure of their Burlington Street Armoury in September of that year. In 1969, the base now called Canadian Forces Reserve Barracks Hamilton was placed under control of CFB Toronto.

=== Post Cold War (1990–present) ===
On 27 September 1997, HMCS Star officially opened their new building, replacing all of the original World War II-era buildings that had housed the Division since its commissioning in 1941.

In 2003, the destroyer HMCS Haida, was moved to a site directly in front of HMCS Star, serving as a lasting memorial to the veterans of Canada's Navy, and a testament to the ongoing connection between Hamilton and this heritage.

HMCS Star is the home to over 200 naval reservists and generates trained individuals and teams for Royal Canadian Navy's domestic and international operations, while at the same time supporting the Canadian Armed Forces efforts to connect with Canadians through the maintenance of a broad national presence.

== Tenders ==
HMCS Haidee (II) (1941–1942) – power cruiser

HMCS Pathfinder (1941–1945) – training ship

Listerville (YTS 578) (1945–1950) – boom defence tug

HC 210/YFL 113 (1946–1970) – boom attendant vessel/harbour craft

Beaver (PTC 706) (1948–1956) – Fairmile-B motor launch

Cougar III (PTC 704) (1956) – Fairmile-B class motor launch

Plainsville (W01/YTS 587) (Ville class) – tugboat

HMCS Scatari (1957–1972) – power cruiser

== Battle honours ==
- Dover, 1652
- Martinique, 1809
- Guadeloupe, 1810

For the bicentennial of the War of 1812, HMCS Star was presented with the Canadian Forces War of 1812 Commemorative Banner. The banner honours the contribution of HMS Lord Melville/Star during the War of 1812.

== Badge ==
=== Description ===
Azure an estoile Or charged with a maple leaf Gules.

=== Significance ===
The device used for the badge is an "estoile" or heraldic star. The red maple leaf, an emblem of Canada, indicates that the "star" pertains to Canada.

== Commanding officers ==
HMCS Star has had 38 commanding officers:

- Commander Kevin Ng, CD (2025–present)
- Lieutenant Commander Michael Di Berardo, CD (2022–2025)
- Lieutenant Commander Marie-Sonya Sowa, CD (2020–2022)
- Commander Stephen Churm, CD (2016–2020)
- Lieutenant Commander Glenn Woolfrey, MMM, CD (2012–2016)
- Lieutenant Commander Shekhar Gothi, CD (2010–2012)
- Lieutenant Commander Dana Baars, CD (2008–2010)
- Lieutenant Commander Glenna Swing, CD (2005–2008)
- Lieutenant Commander Neil S. Bell, CD (2002–2005)
- Lieutenant Commander Doug Martin, CD (1998–2002)
- Lieutenant Commander Peter Duynstee, CD (1995–1998)
- Commander Alaric Woodrow, CD (1991–1995)
- Commander Douglas Yate Sen Mark, CD (1988–1991)
- Commander Robert James “Bob” Williamson, CD (1985–1988)
- Commander Douglas Stewart “Doug” Woodliffe, CD (1982–1985)
- Commander Robert Hugh “Bob” Bowman, CD (1979–1982)
- Commander Martin John “Marty” Pandzich, CD (1975–1979)
- Commander Frederick Joseph Lee, CD (1971–1975)
- Commander Colin DiCenzo, CD (1969–1971)
- Commander Ross Taylor “Buck” Bennett, CMM, (1966–1969)
- Commander Harry Tilbury (1964–1966)
- Commander Bob Galbraith Wilson (1963–1964)
- Commander Wilf Houghton (1958–1963)
- Acting Commander John Henry Curtis (1953–1958)
- Acting Commander George Holcombe Parke (1950–1953)
- Commander Samuel Foster Ross (1946–1950)
- Acting Lieutenant Commander William Hugh Adamson (1946–1946)
- Acting Lieutenant Commander Robert Guy Baker (1946–1946)
- Acting Commander Colin Stinson Glassco (1945–1946)
- Acting Commander Reginald (Cowboy) Jackson (1944–1945)
- Lieutenant John McFetrick (1941–1944)
- Lieutenant Walter Herbert Bruce Thomson (1941–1941)
- Lieutenant Frank Elwood Waterman (1940–1941)
- Lieutenant William Morrison (1940–1940)
- Acting Lieutenant John Cyril Hart (1937–1940)
- Lieutenant Henry Lloyd George Westland (1934–1937)
- Lieutenant William George Beaver (1929–1934)
- Lieutenant Ralph Howard Yeates (1923–1929)

== Notable former members ==
Rear Admiral Jennifer Bennett (1975–1979) – former commander of the Canadian Naval Reserve from 2007 to 2011 and named as one of Canada's 100 Most Powerful Women in 2011

Commodore Ross Bennett (1947, 1963, 1966–1969) – former judge of the Ontario Court of Justice (Provincial Division)

Gwynne Dyer (1959–1965) – former senior lecturer in war studies at the Royal Military Academy Sandhurst and London-based independent Canadian journalist

David Etchells (1955) – member of Canadair CL-215 water bomber test team

Waldron Fox-Decent (1961–1962) – former professor at University of Manitoba and chairperson of the board of directors of the Workers Compensation Board

Seth Grossmith (1952) – former NASA test pilot and fourth naval officer elected to Canada's Aviation Hall of Fame

William Jarvis (1952) – former politician in the province of Ontario, Canada

Joseph Kirkpatrick (1954–1961) – former Ontario Provincial Court judge

Robert Nixon (1946–1950) – retired politician in the province of Ontario, Canada

Morris Perozak (1951–1954) – former Ontario Provincial Court judge

Graham Scott (1966) – former Ontario Deputy Minister of Health, Deputy Minister of the Environment, and CEO of Cancer Care Ontario

Donald Sheppard (1948) – Canada's only F4U Corsair ace of the Second World War, and the first British Royal Navy Fleet Air Arm pilot of any nation to become an ace in the war against Japan

== Gallery ==
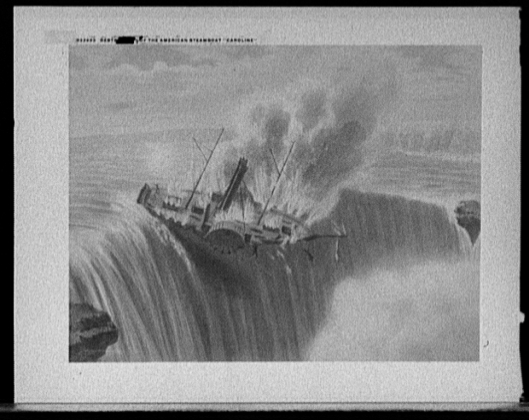
Destruction of the American steamboat Caroline

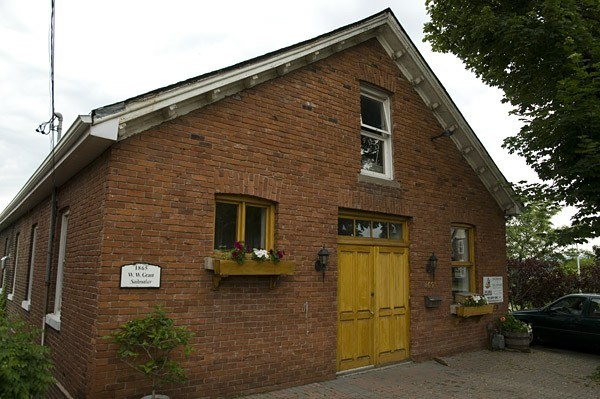
First location of HMCS Star on Bay St. Hamilton, ON

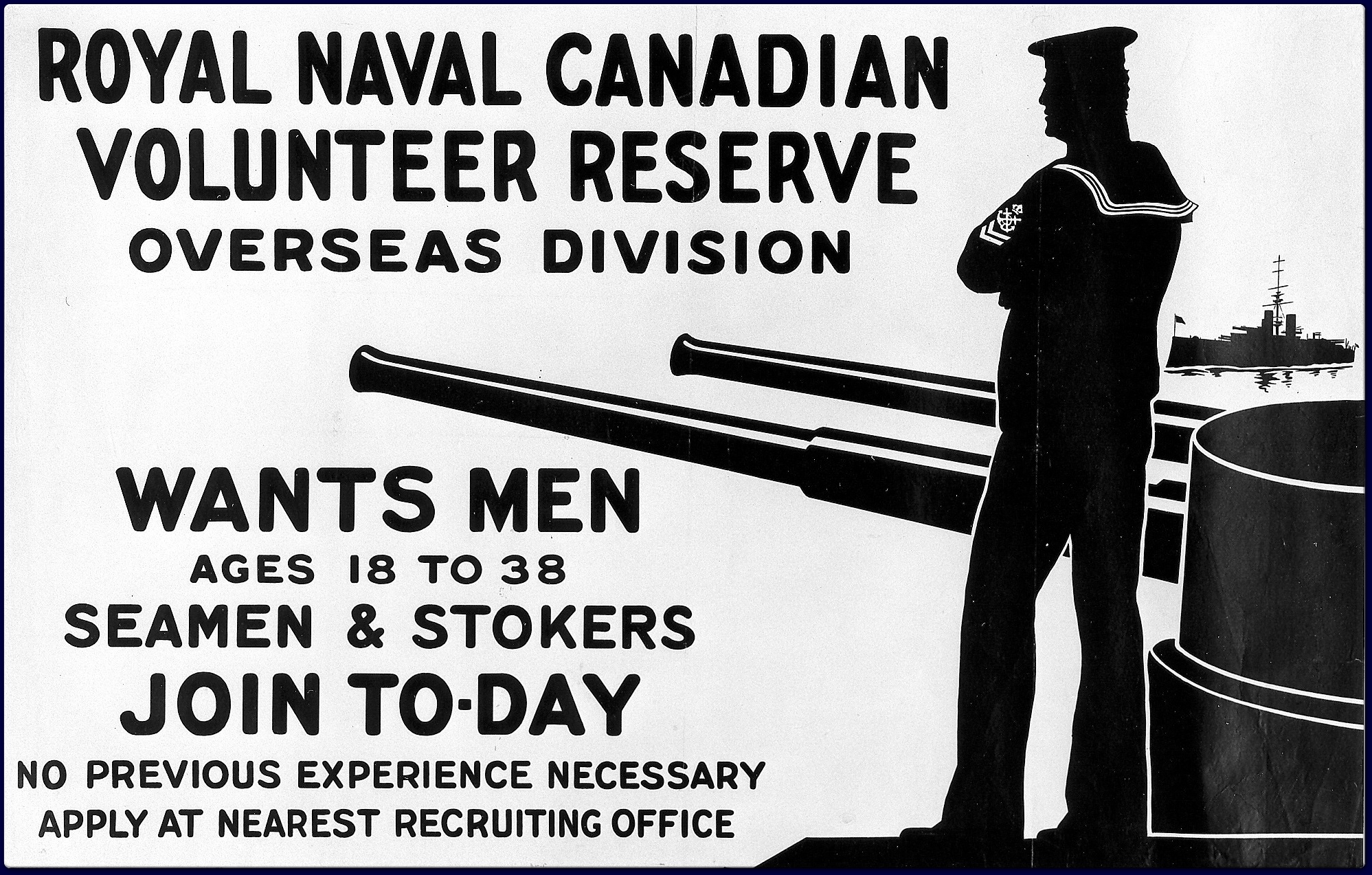
Recruiting advertisement for the Royal Naval Canadian Volunteer Reserve, Overseas Division

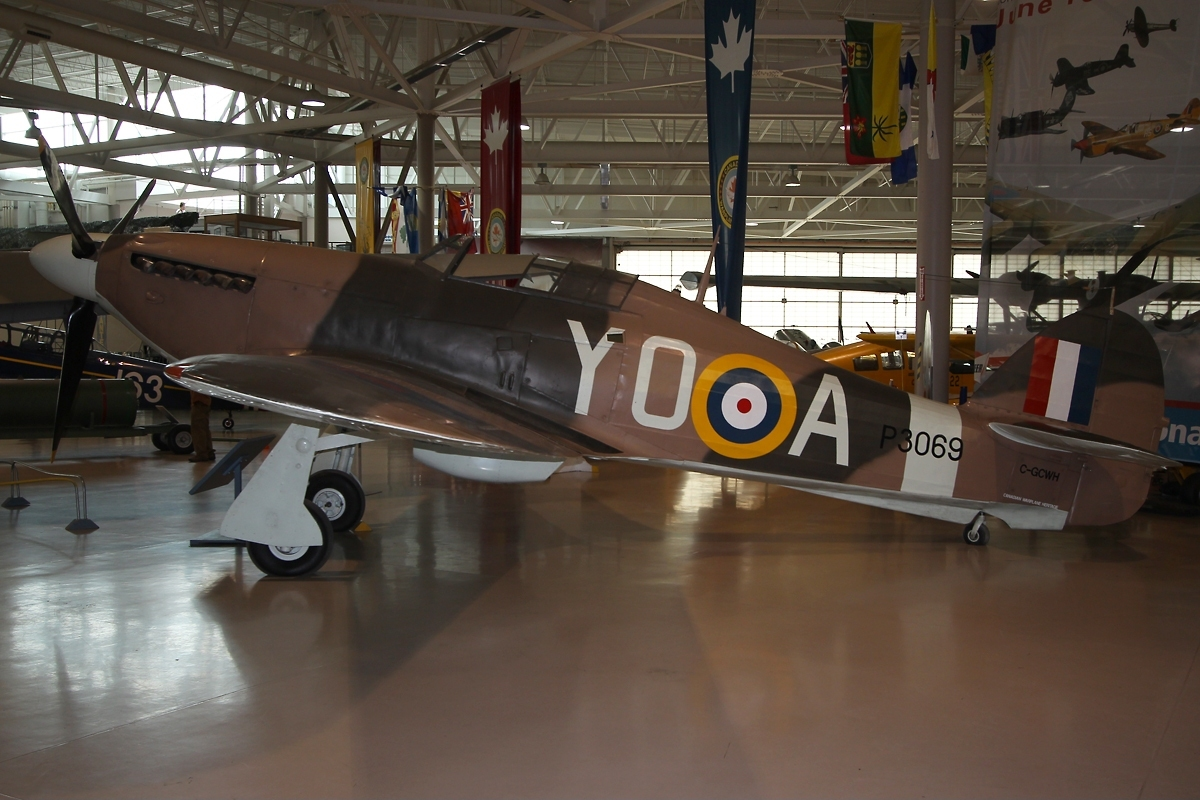
Hawker Hurricane at Canadian Warplane Heritage Museum C-GCWH, YHM Hamilton, ON (John C. Munro Hamilton International Airport)

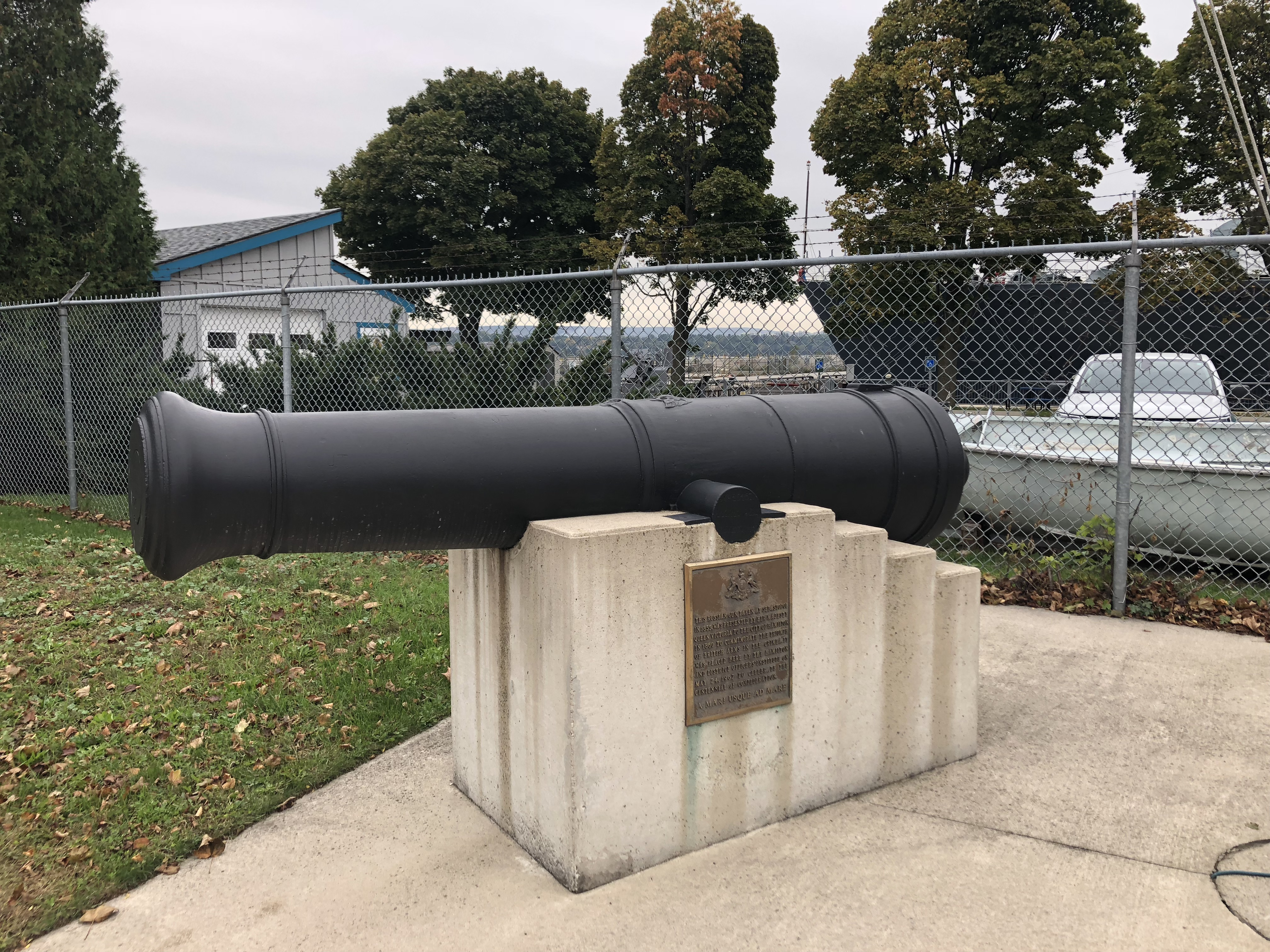
Russian SBML 36-pounder Gun captured at Sevastopol in 1855, given to Hamilton by Queen Victoria in 1860 and mounted as a centennial project in 1967 outside HMCS Star.

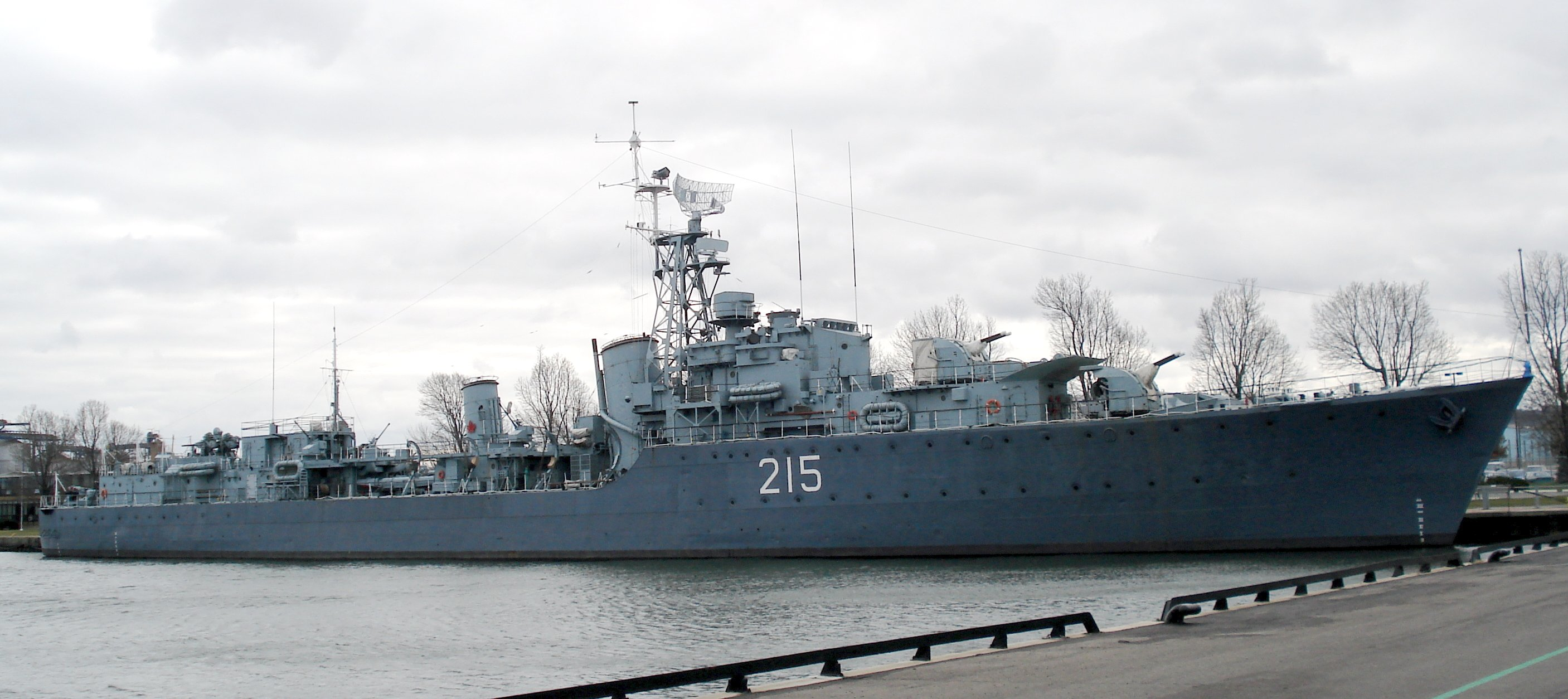
HMCS Haida berthed at Pier 9, on Hamilton Harbour, directly alongside HMCS Star

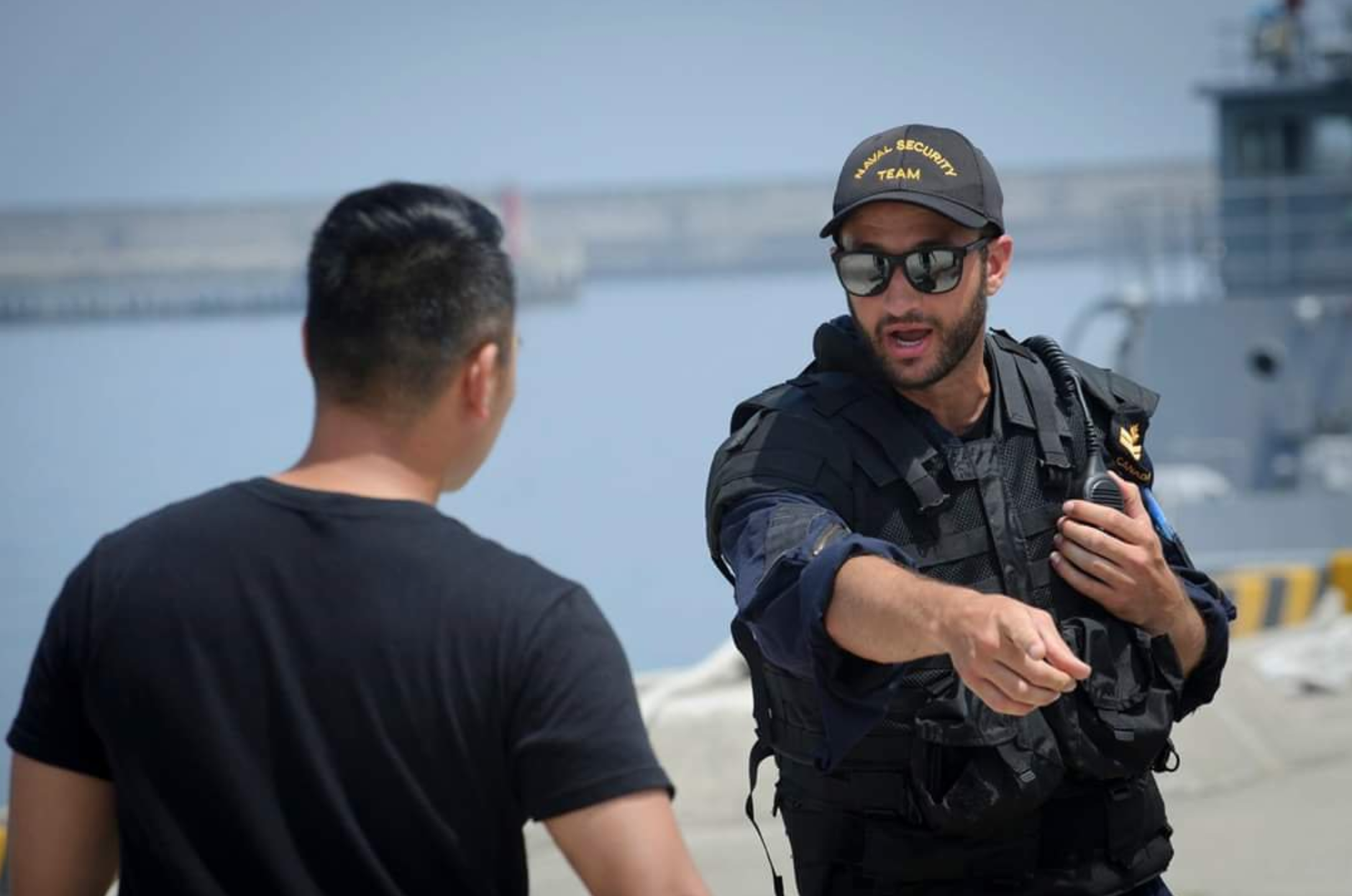
HMCS Star sailor on Naval Security Team workup training prior to deployment in 2017

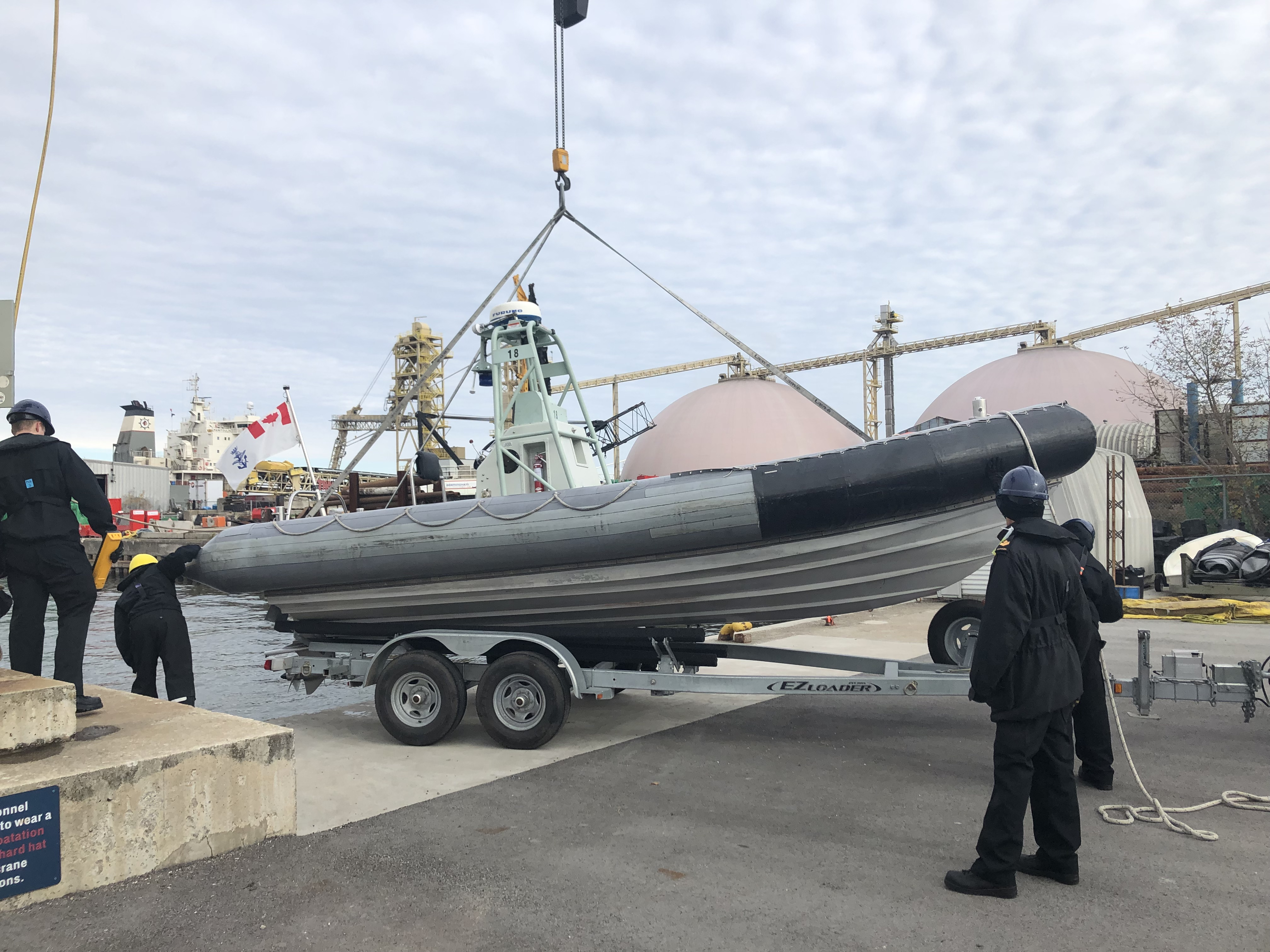
HMCS Star sailors crane a RHIB during Exercise Wentworth Shield 2018
