= David W. Craig =

David W. Craig CD
- Military career
- Branch: Royal Canadian Navy
- Service years: 1974-2015
- Rank: Commodore
- Unit: Canadian Forces Naval Reserve
- Commands: HMCS Malahat
- Awards: Canadian Forces' Decoration

David W. Craig, CD is a past commander of the Canadian Forces Naval Reserve. Entering his service in 1974, he served as a reserve officer for 41 years and retired in 2015.

== Career ==
Craig's career started in 1974 with his posting at HMCS Discovery as a cadet. His posting coincided with his attending the University of British Columbia. He completed his Minor Warship Command qualification in 1984. He was promoted to commander in 1988 and served as the Executive Officer of HMCS Malahat. From 1992 to 1995, he was the ship's captain. After Malahat he served as Directing Staff in STAR II at the Canadian Forces College and PSU 4 Commander in Maritime Forces Pacific. In 1998, he was promoted to captain. He served as Western Region Coordinator for British Columbia, Alberta and Saskatchewan until 2004. In 2004, he was appointed Director of the Joint Command and Staff Course at the Canadian Forces College. In January 2011, he became a commodore and was appointed Commander of the Naval Reserve. He served from January 2011 to July 2015 in this position and retired from the Canadian Armed Forces in August 2015.

== Civilian career ==
In 1978, Craig received a bachelor's degree in Applied Science at the University of British Columbia. In 1982, Craig received a master's degree in Engineering from Carleton University and in 1988 he received a PhD in Computer Science. He has worked as Operational Research scientist at the Air Command Headquarters, and as Section Head of the Command, Control and Computer Section in Maritime Forces Pacific.

== Awards and decorations ==
Craig's personal awards and decorations include the following:

Ribbon	Description	Notes
	Queen Elizabeth II Silver Jubilee Medal	Decoration awarded in 1977; Canadian version
	125th Anniversary of the Confederation of Canada Medal	Decoration awarded in 1992
	Queen Elizabeth Diamond Jubilee Medal	Decoration awarded in 2012; Canadian version
	Canadian Forces' Decoration (CD)	with two Clasp for 32 years of services

Military offices
Preceded by Jennifer Bennett	Commander of the Naval Reserve; 2011–2015	Succeeded by Martha Mulkins
