= Waldron Fox-Decent =

Canadian academic and rear admiral (1937–2019)

Wally Fox-Decent
- Born: Norman Waldron Fox-Decent; July 22, 1937; Winnipeg, Manitoba
- Died: September 5, 2019 (aged 82); Montreal, Quebec
- Education: University of Manitoba (B.A., M.A.)
- Employer(s): University of Manitoba; Workers Compensation Board of Manitoba
- Awards: Order of Canada; Order of Military Merit; Order of Manitoba; Canadian Forces' Decoration

Rear-Admiral Norman Waldron "Wally" Fox-Decent CM CMM OM CD (July 22, 1937 – September 5, 2019) was a Canadian professor, mediator and advisor on constitutional issues and labour relations.

Born in Winnipeg, Manitoba, he received a Bachelor of Arts in political science in 1959 and a Master of Arts in 1971 from the University of Manitoba. From 1962 to 1995, he was professor of political studies at the University of Manitoba.

He joined the Canadian Naval Reserves in 1954 as a cadet at HMCS Chippawa. From 1987 to 1990, he was Chief of Reserves and Cadets for the Canadian Forces. He retired in 1996 with the rank of rear admiral.

In 1989 Fox-Decent chaired the Manitoba Task Force on the Meech Lake Accord. The committee, struck by Premier Gary Filmon and made up of Members of the Legislative Assembly from all three parties, accepted briefs and heard testimony regarding Manitobans' thoughts on the Accord, a constitutional amendment package debated from 1987-1990.

From 1992 to 2005, he was chairman of the Workers Compensation Board of Manitoba.

In 1997, he was made a Member of the Order of Canada. In 2003, he was awarded the Order of Manitoba. He died in Montreal on September 5, 2019.

== Awards and decorations ==
Fox-Decent's personal awards and decorations included the following:

Ribbon	Description	Notes
	Order of Canada (CM)	Appointed Member (CM) on 23 October 1997
	Order of Military Merit (CMM)	Appointed Commander (CMM) on 10 July 1989
	Order of Manitoba (OM)	Appointed (OM) on 15 July 2003; medal number: 054
	Queen Elizabeth II Silver Jubilee Medal	Decoration awarded in 1977; Canadian version
	125th Anniversary of the Confederation of Canada Medal	Decoration awarded in 1992
	Queen Elizabeth II Golden Jubilee Medal	Decoration awarded in 2002; Canadian version
	Queen Elizabeth II Diamond Jubilee Medal	Decoration awarded in 2012; Canadian version
	Canadian Forces' Decoration (CD)	with three Clasp for 42 years of services

Military offices
Preceded by T.A.M. Smith	Senior Naval Reserve Adviser; 1983–1986	Succeeded by G.L. Peer
