= Grand River Naval Depot =

Coordinates: 42.862033°N 79.577066°W

- Port Maitland, Ontario

Site information
- Type: Shipyard, naval base
- Controlled by: Royal Navy – never built

Site history
- Built: planned
- In use: never built

Grand River Naval Depot was a planned Royal Navy base on Lake Erie in what is now Port Maitland, Ontario, Canada.

Located at the mouth of the Grand River, the naval base was to have been built as a second Royal Navy naval base on Lake Erie intended to complement the base at Navy Island. It was to have stationed 1,000 sailors and 3 frigates. It was never completed and the site was abandoned by the Royal Navy. It is now the site of Esplanade Park in Port Maitland.

In 1815 Commodore Sir Edward Campbell Rich Owen had sent a letter to Lieutenant General Gordon Drummond of interest to establish a naval shipyard in the area and land was acquired from the Six Nations but nothing beyond the establishment of naval base with personnel was established in 1816.

Following the Rush Bagot Treaty, the base slowly wound down. An 1820 survey was ordered and the base was re-established but closed permanently in 1834.

== See also ==
- Battle of Lake Erie
- Navy Island Royal Naval Shipyard
