= Jennifer Bennett =

Canadian military officer (born 1958)

Rear-Admiral Jennifer Bennett CMM CD
- Born: August 11, 1958 (age 68); Hamilton, Ontario, Canada
- Education: McMaster University (BPE, 1981); Queen's University at Kingston (BEd, 1982); Royal Roads University (MA, 2005)
- Military career
- Allegiance: Canada
- Branch: Royal Canadian Navy / Canadian Forces Maritime Command
- Service years: 1976–2019
- Rank: Rear-Admiral
- Commands: Chief of Reserves and Cadets (2011–2015); Commander of the Naval Reserve (2007–2011); HMCS Malahat (1995–1998)

Rear-Admiral Jennifer Jane Bennett, CMM, CD is a retired Canadian Forces Naval Reserve officer. In 2011, she served as Chief of Reserves and Cadets. As such, she was the highest ranking reservist in the Canadian Armed Forces (CAF) and the most senior woman in the Royal Canadian Navy (RCN). She was named as one of Canada's 100 Most Powerful Women in 2011.

== Early life and education ==
Bennett was born on 11 August 1958, in Hamilton, Ontario. She received a Bachelor of Physical Education from McMaster University in 1981, followed by a Bachelor of Education from Queen's University at Kingston in 1982 and a Master of Arts in leadership and training from Royal Roads University in 2005.

In June 2015, Bennett was awarded an honorary Doctor of Laws (LLD) degree by the University of Alberta. Three years later, she received an honorary Doctor of Science from McMaster University.

== Career ==
Bennett began her naval career in 1975 when she enrolled in HMCS Star, reaching the rank of officer cadet in the logistics branch two years later, then sub-lieutenant in 1979. In the early 1980s, she served in HMCS Cataraqui, earning the rank of lieutenant in 1982, then lieutenant commander in 1987. In 1991, she was promoted to executive officer in HMCS Malahat. The following year, she was award the 125th Anniversary of the Confederation of Canada Medal. From 1995 to 1998, Bennett served as commanding officer from 1995 to 1998, at which point she became the logistics branch advisor for the Naval Reserve.

In 2000, Bennett was promoted to captain and served in Ottawa, including as director of the region's Canadian Defence Academy. In 2002, she was awarded the Queen Elizabeth II Golden Jubilee Medal. In 2004, she was appointed an Officer of the Order of Military Merit (OMM) in recognition of "outstanding meritorious service in duties of responsibility". She reached the rank of commodore in 2007. From 2007 to 2011, Bennett served as Commander of the Naval Reserve.

In 2011, Bennett was promoted to rear-admiral, becoming the first woman to reach the rank in the RCN. That year, she also became the first woman to serve as Chief of Reserves and Cadets, a position she held until 2015. In this position, Bennett was the highest ranking reservist in the Canadian Armed Forces and the most senior woman in the RCN. Also in 2011, the Canadian Broadcasting Corporation named Bennett one of Canada's 100 Most Powerful Women. The following year, she was awarded the Queen Elizabeth II Diamond Jubilee Medal, and was promoted to Commander of the Order of Military Merit (CMM) in recognition of "outstanding meritorious service and demonstrated leadership in duties of great responsibility". During the mid- to late-2010s, Bennett helped the RCN respond to and prevent sexual misconduct, as well as support former LGBT CAF members impacted by homophobic policies.

In addition to her work directly with the CAF and RCN, Bennett worked with NATO and the UN to support women in the military. From 2013 to 2018, she served as the Defence Champion for Women, becoming the first woman to serve in the position.

Beyond the CAF and RCN, Bennett also worked as a school teacher and administrator in Ontario and British Columbia from 1983 to 2008.

Bennett retired in 2019, though has continue to volunteer in related arenas.

== Awards and decorations ==
Bennett's personal awards and decorations include the following:

Ribbon	Description	Notes
	125th Anniversary of the Confederation of Canada Medal	Decoration awarded in 1992
	Queen Elizabeth II Golden Jubilee Medal	Decoration awarded in 2002; Canadian version
	Order of Military Merit (CMM)	Appointed Officer (OMM) on 29 September 2004; Appointed Commander (CMM) on 17 October 2012
	Queen Elizabeth II Diamond Jubilee Medal	Decoration awarded in 2012; Canadian version
	Canadian Forces' Decoration (CD)	with three Clasp for 42 years of service

CDS Commendation

== Personal life ==
Bennett's father, sister, and brother served in the Naval Reserve, with her father retiring as a commodore.

Military offices
Preceded by Bob Blakely	Commander of the Naval Reserve; 2007 to 2011	Succeeded by David W. Craig
Preceded by	Chief of Reserves and Cadets; 2011 to 2015	Succeeded by P.J. Bury
