= HMCS Chippawa =

- Active: 1941 to present
- Country: Canada
- Branch: Royal Canadian Navy
- Type: Stone Frigate
- Role: Reserve unit
- Part of: Canadian Forces Naval Reserve
- Garrison/HQ: 1 Navy Way; Winnipeg, Manitoba; R3C 4J7
- Motto: Service
- Colors: Azure Blue and White
- Anniversaries: Battle of the Atlantic
- Equipment: Various types of inboard and outboard rigid-hull inflatable boats
- Battle honours: None

HMCS Chippawa is a Royal Canadian Navy Reserve Division (NRD) located in Winnipeg, Manitoba. Dubbed a stone frigate, HMCS Chippawa is a land-based naval establishment for part-time sailors as well as a local recruitment centre for the Royal Canadian Navy (RCN).

She is the furthest inland unit of all 24 naval reserve divisions located in major cities across Canada. She was first formed in February 1923 as the Winnipeg Company Royal Canadian Naval Volunteer Reserve (RCNVR) and then in 1941 as HMCS Chippawa.

== Namesake ==
HMCS Chippawa is named after a British mercantile schooner called HMS Chippawa that saw action against the Americans at the Battle of Lake Erie on 10 September 1813. The ship itself was named after the Ojibwe Indigenous ethnic group (Chippewa being an anglicized adaptation) which inhabited the area near the Saulte at the west end of Lake Superior.

== History ==
=== Formation (1923–1941) ===
The division was originally formed on 19 March 1923 as the Winnipeg Company of the Royal Canadian Naval Volunteer Reserve, later renamed The Winnipeg Division in 1936.

In 1941, the division was commissioned HMCS Chippawa. The first commanding officer of the division was Eustace Brock, the Assistant Secretary of the Great-West Life Assurance Company. In March 1923 the unit's first quarters were a small office and a classroom located in McGregor Armouries. Later, in the spring of 1924 the division moved into the Rat-Portage Lumber Company building in Norwood, which is still standing today as the Poulin's Exterminators building.

In the years following, the division moved to the old St Matthew's Church on the corner of Sherbrook Street and Ellice Avenue, to a condemned fire hall on Gertrude Avenue just off Osborne Street (now demolished), to space at the Security Storage building on Ellice Avenue, and then in October 1942 to the old Winnipeg Winter Club located at 51 Smith Street.

=== Cold War (1945–1989) ===
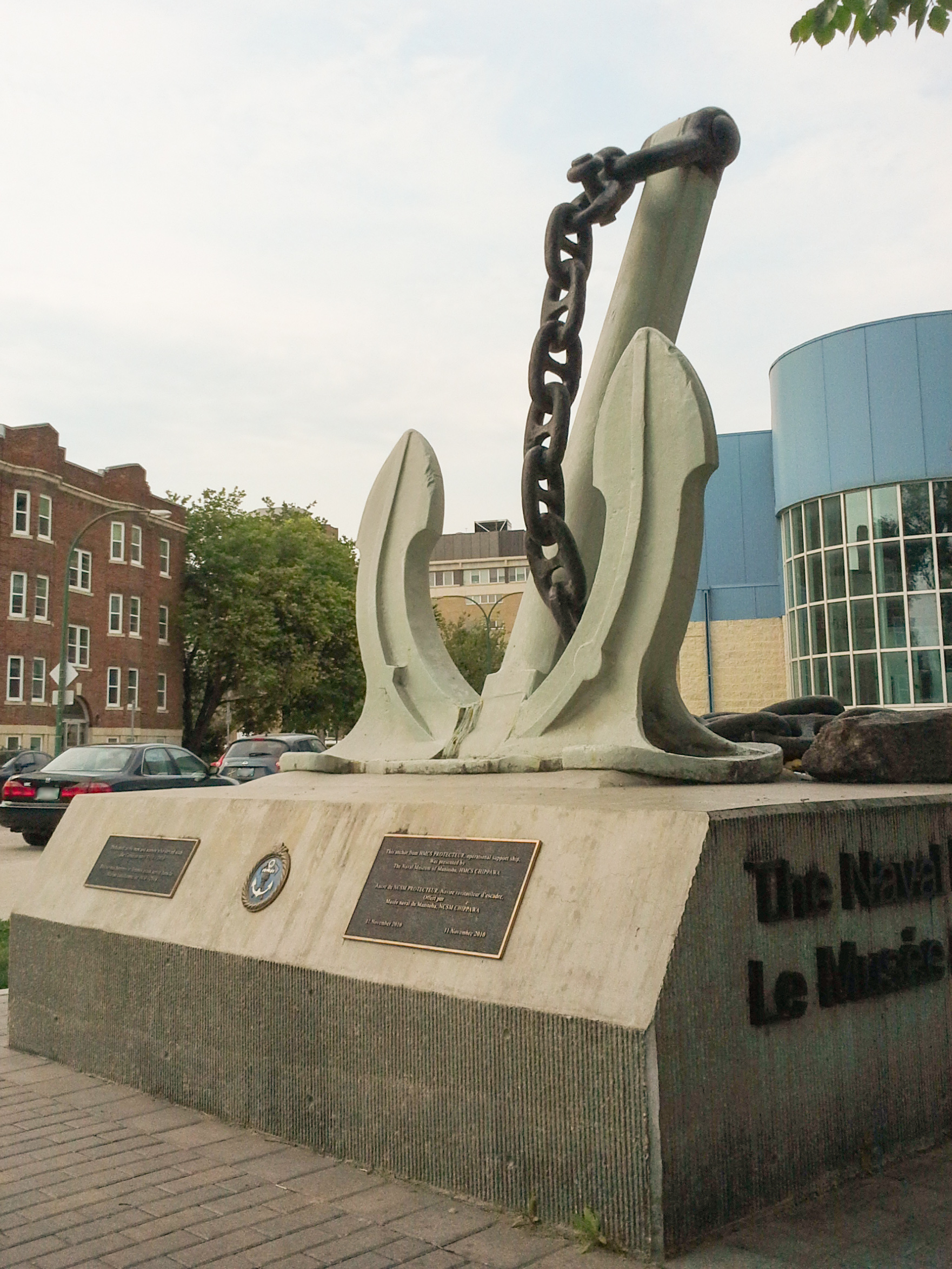
Anchor statue outside of the Naval Museum of Manitoba

In the spring of 1950 the Red and Assiniboine Rivers overflowed their banks and threatened Winnipeg. Thousands of citizens had to be evacuated from their homes and sent to neighbouring towns and provinces. Chippawa became the centre of flood-fighting activities and naval personnel, both Regular and Reserve, were sent to Winnipeg from all over the country and lived on board Chippawa for several weeks. The ship's galley was activated and within 48 hours was serving 1,500 meals a day to the flood fighters. Chippawa's Main Drill Deck served as a marshalling area for motor boats and other marine craft used during the flood.

In the early 1950s a polio epidemic hit the city and Chippawa's facilities were once again pressed into service. Chippawa's heated swimming pool was used for therapy for polio victims for close to two years following the epidemic.

During the 1960s Chippawa participated in Canada's Centennial by building an authentic York boat on the drill deck of Chippawa, and later launched and named her Chippawa II. In 1967, Chippawa provided facilities and support for the Pan-American Games hosted by Winnipeg. It was during this decade that HMCS Chippawa grew to be the largest of all the 21 Naval Reserve divisions with more than 300 members of ship's company, comprising all ranks.

A reorganization of military bands left the Chippawa band as one of the few remaining official Naval Reserve bands in Canada. Lately, the manning of the Kingston-class coastal defence vessels has caused many of Chippawa's trained personnel to leave Winnipeg to commission and man the ships. This has caused challenges to the recruiting system, to replace these people as fast as they depart.

=== Post-Cold War (1990–present) ===
In the spring of 1997, Manitoba endured another flood. Chippawa became the home for nearly 200 naval reservists from units across Canada. Chippawa's galley put out thousands of meals for the flood fighters, her classrooms became accommodations, and her main deck became a parking lot and repair area for boats of all shapes and sizes. The reserve sailors were tasked to flooded areas all across southern Manitoba. In the flooded areas just south of Winnipeg, the reservists were instrumental in saving many homes in the area of Grande Pointe and South St. Mary's Road. At the end of the emergency the Commander of Maritime Operations Group Four, Captain Forcier, told all reserves in Chippawa that in the areas just south of Winnipeg "he had witnessed the finest example of seamanship he had ever seen, Regular Force or Reserve."

In summer of 1998, the old Winnipeg Winter Club building was demolished and a new building was built on the same site. While the building was being built the division paraded in Hangar 11 at 17 Wing Winnipeg. In November 1999, the new naval training building was completed and the division moved back to its downtown Winnipeg headquarters.

== Badge ==
=== Description ===
Azure and anchor on two tomahawks in saltire Argent and over all at the fesse point a garb Or.

=== Significance ===
The anchor and blue background represent the sea. The tomahawks allude to the Chippawa Tribe, and the wheat sheaf represent the prairie province of the division.

== Lodger Units ==
- 25 Royal Canadian Sea Cadet Corps Crusader
- 49 Royal Canadian Sea Cadet Corps JT Cornwell VC
- 213 Royal Canadian Sea Cadet Corps Qu'Appelle

== Notable former members ==
- Bill Allum – Canadian ice hockey player
- Charles Goodeve – Canadian chemist and pioneer in operations research
- Edward A. Sellers – Canadian academic
- Fred Shero – former ice hockey player and coach
- Waldron Fox-Decent – Canadian academic
- Robert-Falcon Ouellette – Former member of Parliament for Winnipeg Centre

== Sources ==
- Nelson, Mark. Winnipeg's Navy: The History of the Naval Reserve in Winnipeg, 1923-2003. ISBN 0-9732825-0-9.
