= Navy Island Royal Naval Shipyard =

Coordinates: 43.0554°N 79.0096°W

- Niagara River, Ontario

Site information
- Type: Shipyard
- Controlled by: Royal Navy

Site history
- Built: 1700s
- In use: 1763–1818
- Battles/wars: War of 1812

Garrison information
- Garrison: French naval base 1700s; Royal Navy base for Lake Erie after 1763

Navy Island Royal Naval Shipyard was a Royal Navy yard in Upper Canada, now Ontario.

Located on Navy Island in the Niagara River, it served as a French naval base in the early 18th century and was acquired by the British in 1763. The Royal Navy used it for their Lake Erie fleet during the War of 1812. It was Abandoned by the navy with the passage of the Rush-Bagot Treaty in 1817. It is now a National Historic site and managed by the Niagara Parks Commission.

Ships built (two sloops and three schooners), repaired or defending or stationed at the base included:

- HMS Tecumseth (1) – schooner 1814, sunk 1828; raised and displayed since 1953
- HMS Detroit
- HMS Hunter
- HMS Chippeway (1)
- HMS Queen Charlotte
- HMS Lady Prevost
- HMS Little Belt
- Huron – schooner 1761
- Michigan – sloop 1762
- Royal Charlotte – sloop 1764
- Boston – schooner 1764
- HMS Victory – schooner 1764
- Gladwyn – schooner 1764
- Newash – schooner 1815 (1)
- Minos – steam vessel 1840 (1)

(1) – built in Chippawa

== See also ==
- Battle of Lake Erie
- Provincial Marine
