= Commodore (Canada) =

General officer military rank, Canadian Navy

Commodore Commodore
- Left: shoulder board Right: cuff insignia
- Country: Canada
- Service branch: Royal Canadian Navy
- Abbreviation: Cmdre
- NATO rank code: OF-6
- Next higher rank: Rear-admiral
- Next lower rank: Captain(N)
- Equivalent ranks: Brigadier-general

Commodore (Cmdre; French: commodore [cmdre]) is a Canadian Forces rank used by commissioned officers of the Royal Canadian Navy. Brigadier-general is the equivalent rank in the Canadian Army and the Royal Canadian Air Force.

It is the lowest flag officer rank, senior to a naval captain (colonel in the Canadian Army and the Royal Canadian Air Force), and junior to a rear admiral (major general in the Canadian Army and the Royal Canadian Air Force).

== Insignia ==
A wide gold band with executive curl is displayed on each sleeve of the service dress and mess dress. Shoulder boards and rank slip-ons have a single maple leaf, above which is a crossed sabre and baton surmounted by St Edward's Crown.

Navy uniform variations

Current shoulder board and cuff insignia

Dress uniform tunic - pre-2010

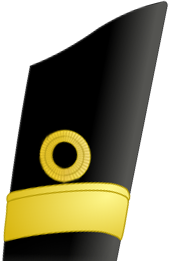
Cuff insignia - July 2010
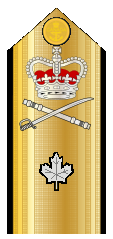
Shoulder boards for:
short-sleeve shirt,
tropical white tunic,
summer white mess dress,
2C shipboard mess dress

Uniform shirts

CADPAT uniform

== See also ==
- Canadian Forces ranks and insignia
