= HMCS Malahat =

Coordinates: 48°25′22″N 123°23′12″W

- Active: 1944–1946, 1947–present
- Country: Canada
- Branch: Royal Canadian Navy
- Type: Naval reserve division
- Part of: Royal Canadian Naval Reserve
- Mottos: Latin: Navis exercitatione parata (A ship prepared by training)
- Colours: gold dark green

Commanders
- Commanding Officer: LCdr Anne Gardam

HMCS Malahat is a Royal Canadian Navy Reserve Division (NRD) located in Victoria, British Columbia. Dubbed a stone frigate, HMCS Malahat is a land-based naval training establishment for part-time sailors as well as a local recruitment centre for the Canadian Naval Reserve. It is one of 24 naval reserve divisions in major cities across Canada.

== History ==
The genesis of Canada's Naval Reserve first emerged in Victoria in 1913, when a group of citizens began coming together several evenings each week to become familiar with drill, seamanship, admiralty law, arms drill and naval organization.

Then-Cmdr. Walter Hose, who was in charge of Her Majesty's Dockyard, provided support and encouragement to this volunteer group. Hose believed that the only way to win public support for the fledgling Royal Canadian Navy (RCN) was to create a citizen navy, "a naval reserve with units across the country".

The volunteer group was legitimized by an Order-in-Council on May 18, 1914. They became No.1 Half Company of the Royal Naval Canadian Volunteer Reserve (RNCVR).

At the start of World War I, the only naval reserve force in Canada was the volunteer unit in Victoria. Its members went to war in HMCS Rainbow, the submarines CC-1 and CC-2 and other vessels based in Esquimalt. Following the general demobilization at the end of the war, the RNCVR was disbanded.

The Royal Canadian Navy Volunteer Reserve (RCNVR) was established in January 1923, with 1000 officers and men. Naval reserve divisions soon opened in fifteen cities across Canada. Victoria's No.1 Half Company was not re-established in 1923, and "it was felt that the Regular Navy presented enough of a presence in Esquimalt, that a reserve unit would seem to be a waste of money in an era of extreme austerity".

For nearly 20 years, Victoria's only connection with the RCNVR was the large groups of reservists who carried out naval training in Esquimalt every summer.

World War II brought the naval reserve back to Victoria in the form of a combined Women's Royal Canadian Naval Service (WRCNS) and RCNVR recruiting centre. In 1944, the recruiting centre was commissioned as HMCS Malahat, with an expanded role that included training.

Despite public outcry, HMCS Malahat was disbanded only two years later in 1946. Malahat's officers and men were borne of the books on HMCS Discovery in Vancouver, while the Victoria office continued to operate as a recruiting centre.

HMCS Malahat was recommissioned as one of Canada's Naval Reserve Divisions on April 23, 1947, the same day as HMCS Scotian in Halifax. The two were the 14th and 15th of the 24 divisions commissioned. The remainder of the 24 Naval Reserve Divisions would be subsequently commissioned, with the last being HMCS Queen Charlotte (Charlottetown) in 1994.

== See also ==
- List of Canadian Forces Naval Reserve divisions
- Stone frigate
