= HMCS Carleton =

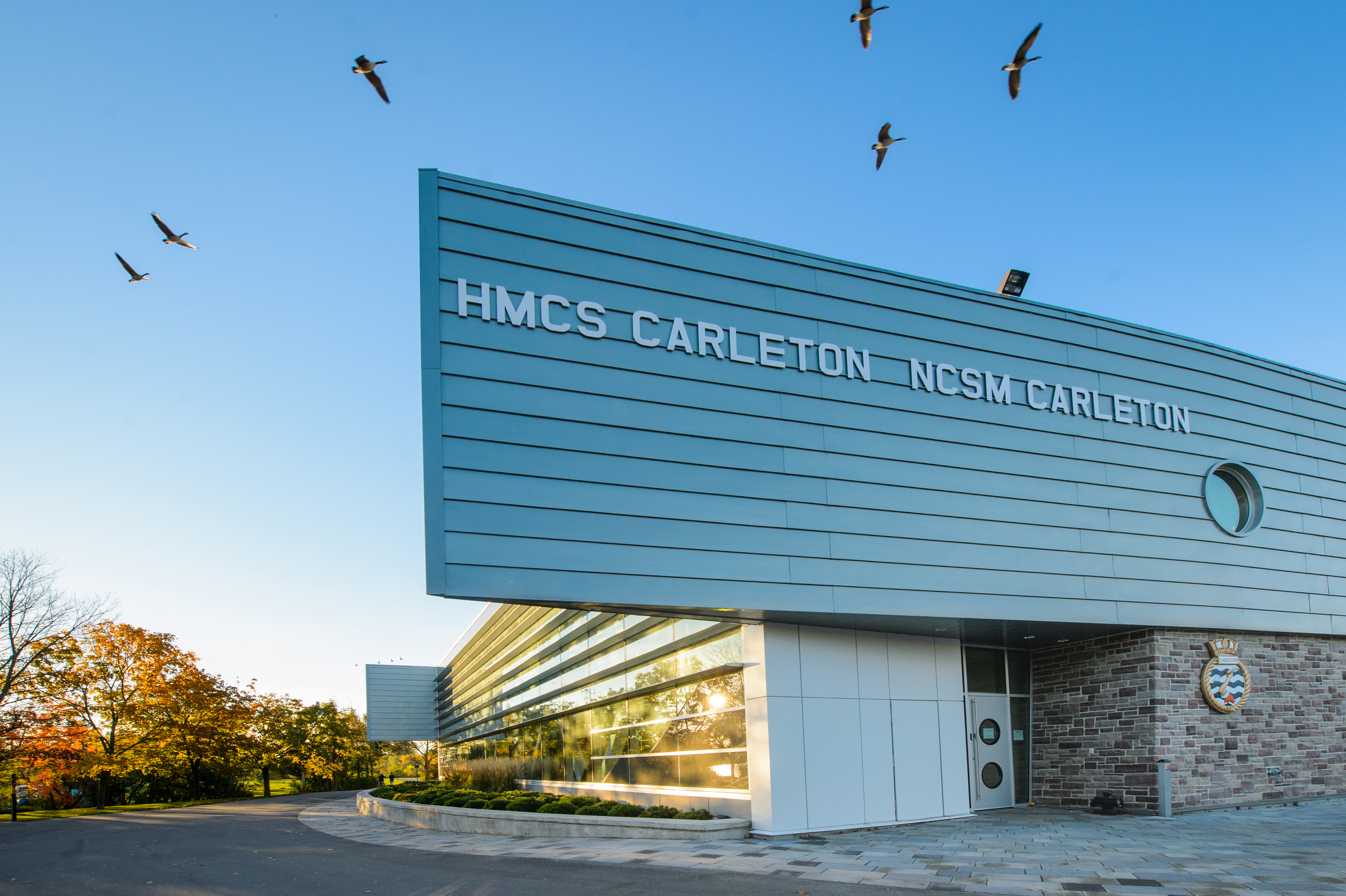
- HMCS Carleton in 2016
- Active: 1941–present
- Country: Canada
- Branch: Royal Canadian Navy
- Size: Approx. 260
- Part of: Canadian Forces Naval Reserve
- Garrison/HQ: 79 Prince of Wales Dr, Ottawa, ON, K1A 0K2
- Mottos: Vincemus Armus (With These Arms We Conquer)
- Colors: Scarlet and White
- Equipment: Various types of inboard and outboard rigid-hull inflatable boats
- Battle honours: Lake Champlain, 1776

Commanders
- Commanding Officer: Commander J.P. Roddick
- Executive Officer: Lieutenant Commander R. Morris
- Coxswain: Petty Officer 1st Class D. Brodhead

HMCS Carleton is a Canadian Forces Naval Reserve Division (NRD) located in Ottawa, Ontario, Canada. A so-callled stone frigate, HMCS Carleton is a land-based naval training establishment crewed by part-time sailors and also serves as a local recruitment centre for the Canadian Forces Naval Reserve. It is one of 24 naval reserve divisions located in major cities across Canada.

== Namesake ==
HMCS Carleton is named after HMS Carleton, a British schooner which took part in the American War of Independence at the Battle of Valcour Island in 1776.

== History ==
With the establishment of the Royal Canadian Navy Volunteer Reserve (RCNVR) in 1923, the Ottawa Half-Company was stood up in 1923. In 1935, the name of the Ottawa Half-Company was changed to the "Ottawa Division of the RCNVR".

Just prior to Canada's declaration of war on Germany, the Canadian government called the Naval Reserve into active service. For the duration of hostilities, the Ottawa Division concentrated on the recruitment and basic training of sailors and by the end of the war some 4,620 officers and men had enlisted through the Ottawa Reserve Division.

On 1 November 1941, the Ottawa Division was commissioned as HMCS Carleton, named after HMS Carleton, a schooner named after Governor Guy Carleton, who defeated Richard Montgomery and Benedict Arnold at the Battle of Quebec on 31 December 1775.

On 17 December 1943, HMCS Carleton moved to its current facilities at Canadian Forces Reserve Barrack Dow's Lake, when the new "stone frigate" was inaugurated in the presence of Major General Alexander Cambridge, 1st Earl of Athlone and the then Governor General of Canada. In 1944, a new type of naval presence was added to Carleton when the barracks blocks were occupied by the Women's Royal Canadian Naval Service (WRENS). New training facilities were then added to Carleton in the late 1940s and early 1950s.

A memorial anchor with plaques on a concrete base, and nine-pounder guns were erected by HMCS Carleton. This memorial, which was unveiled on 6 May 1973 by Governor General Roland Michener, is dedicated to the Naval Reservists and the Naval Reserve in the fiftieth year of the Naval Reserve. The monument was rededicated in 2023 as part of the celebrations for the 100th anniversary of the Naval Reserve.

Since its establishment, members of Carleton have played an active role in the National Capital Region. In recognition of its contribution to the community, Carleton was presented with the Key to the City of Ottawa in 1976 and Freedom of the City in 2017 and 2023.

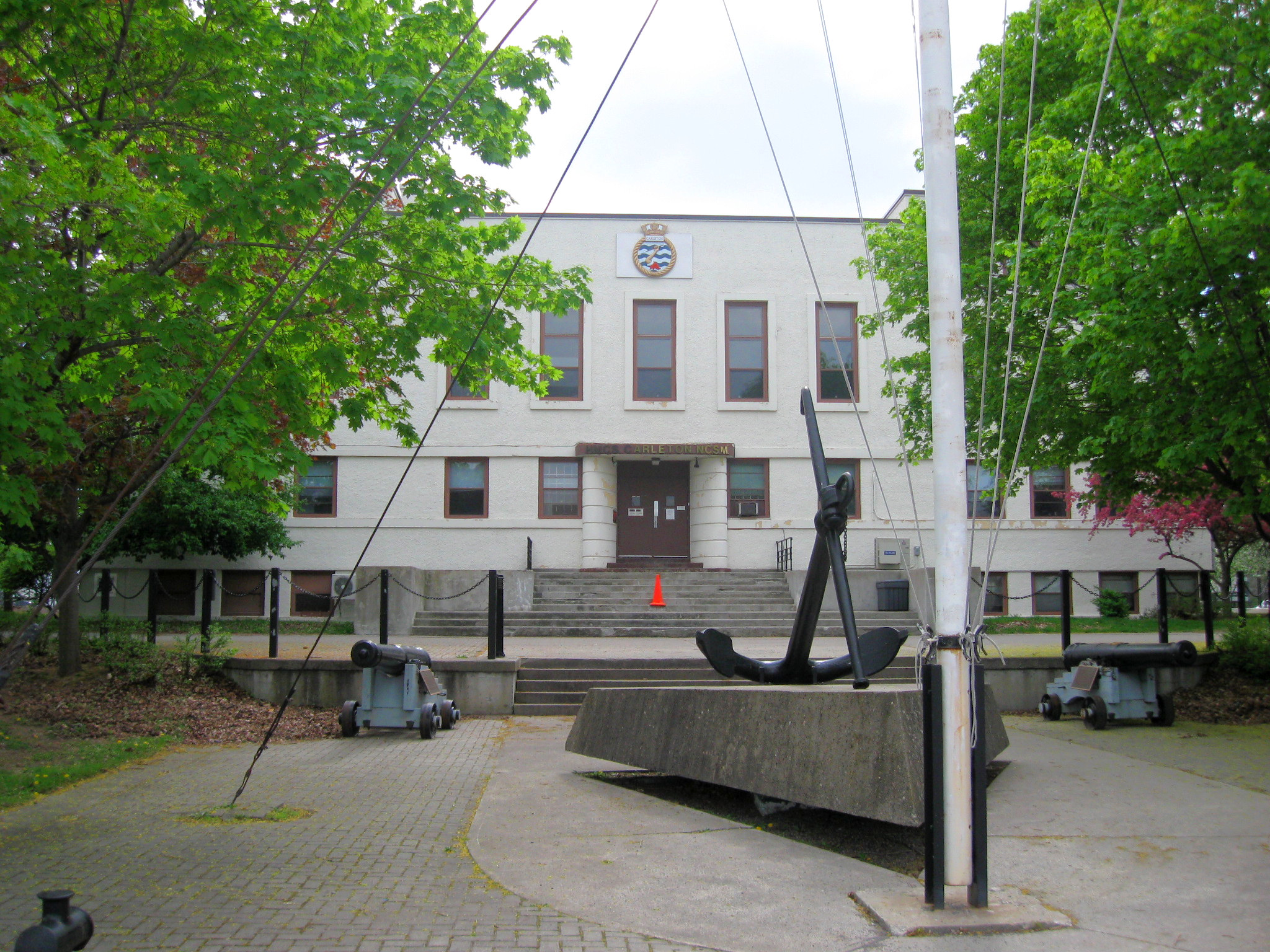
HMCS Carleton barracks at CFRB Dow's Lake, Ottawa, Ontario, Canada. Demolished in September 2013.

== Operations ==
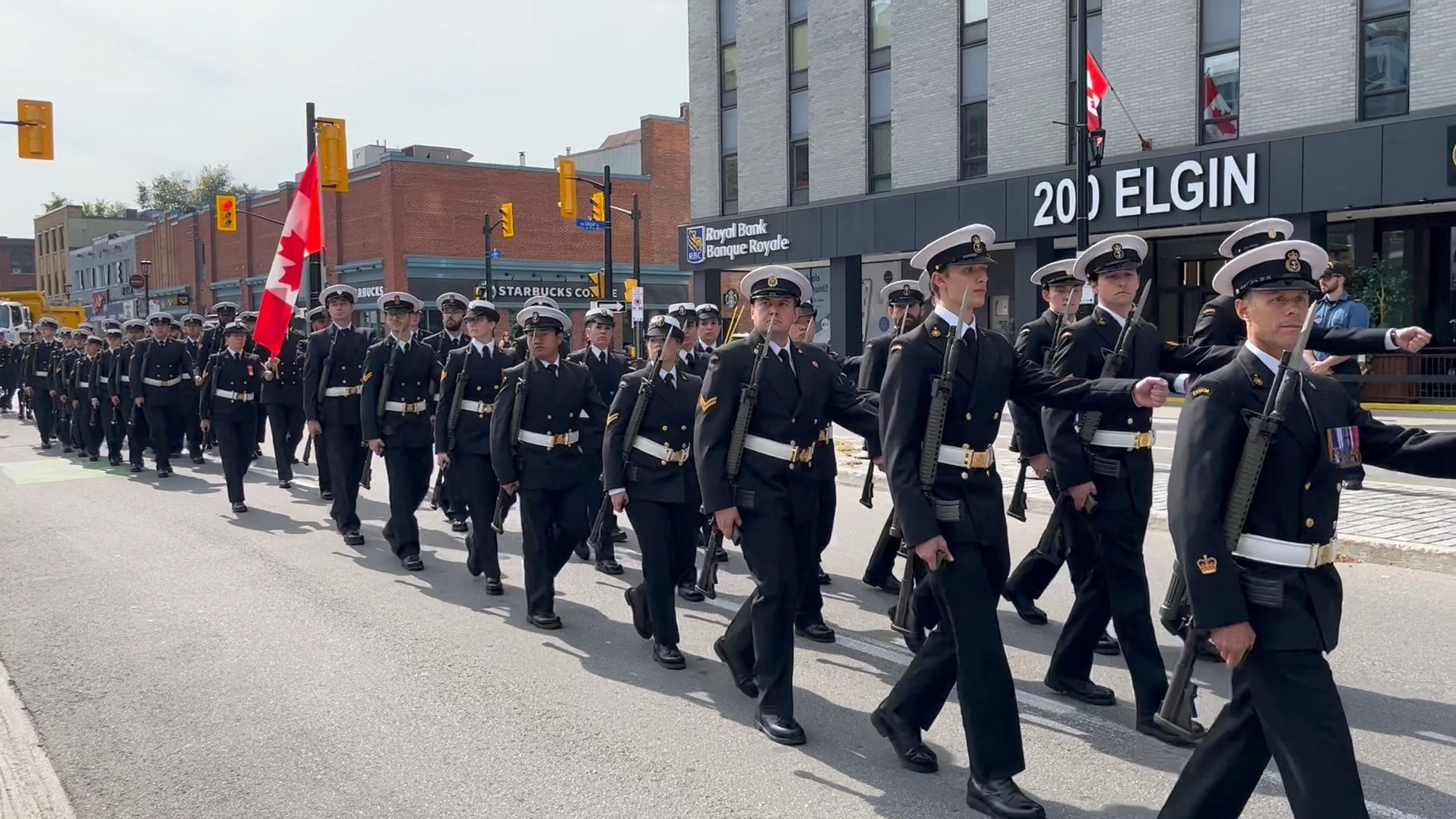
Ship's company of HMCS Carleton exercising Freedom of the City of Ottawa

Until September 2013, HMCS Carleton operated continuously to provide employment and training for its sailors. Its facilities consisted of an administration building, drill hall, classroom building, shooting range, boat shed and a large vehicle compound.

On 19 March 2008 several main supports for the roof of the drill hall failed resulting in its closure and then demolition, and this accelerated plans to replace the 65-year-old administration building and drill hall. Temporary office and classroom spaces, as well as a temporary parade structure, were installed on site. At the end of September 2013 demolition of the administration building began. A new administration building, including a drill hall, was built and opened its doors in 2015. An official 'Manning Ship Ceremony' was held on 21 November 2015.

Although most of the sailors who are members of HMCS Carleton work on a part-time basis through the training year (September to May), there is a staff of ten full-time members (five Class B Reservists and five Regular Force) who ensure the efficient operation and administration of the unit.

HMCS Carleton has administration nights every Tuesday, and training nights on Thursdays from mid-September through to early May. HMCS Carleton also has weekend training throughout the year in order to augment training.

== Battle honours ==
- Lake Champlain, 1776

== Badge ==
Description: Barry wavy of eight Argent and Azure the crest from the Arms of Sir Guy Carleton, Baron Dorchester which is "A dexter arm embowed and naked at the elbow the shirt sleeve folded above the elbow Argent and vested Gules; the hand grasping an arrow in bend sinister point downwards proper."

Significance: Although the division was named after the British schooner HMS Carleton (Battle of Valcour Island, 11 October 1776), there is no doubt that the original ship was named in honour of Sir Guy Carleton who is accredited with having saved Canada for the British in the defeat of Montgomery and Arnold at Quebec, New Year's Eve 1775–1776. Placing the Carleton crest upon the field of heraldic water indicates connection with the sea.

== Lodger units ==
- 40 Falkland Royal Canadian Sea Cadet Corps
- 171 Vice Admiral Kingsmill Navy League Cadet Corps
- 211 Ottawa Kiwanis Royal Canadian Air Cadet Squadron

== See also ==
- Stone frigate
