= Units of the Royal Engineers =

This is a list of units of the British Army's Royal Engineers.

== Brigades & Groups ==
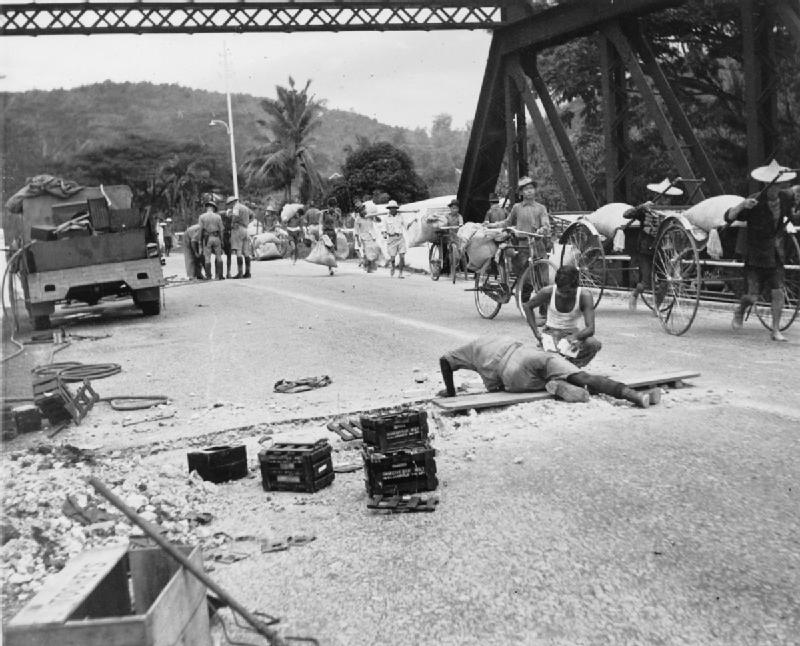
Combat Engineers prepare a bridge for demolition in Malaya.

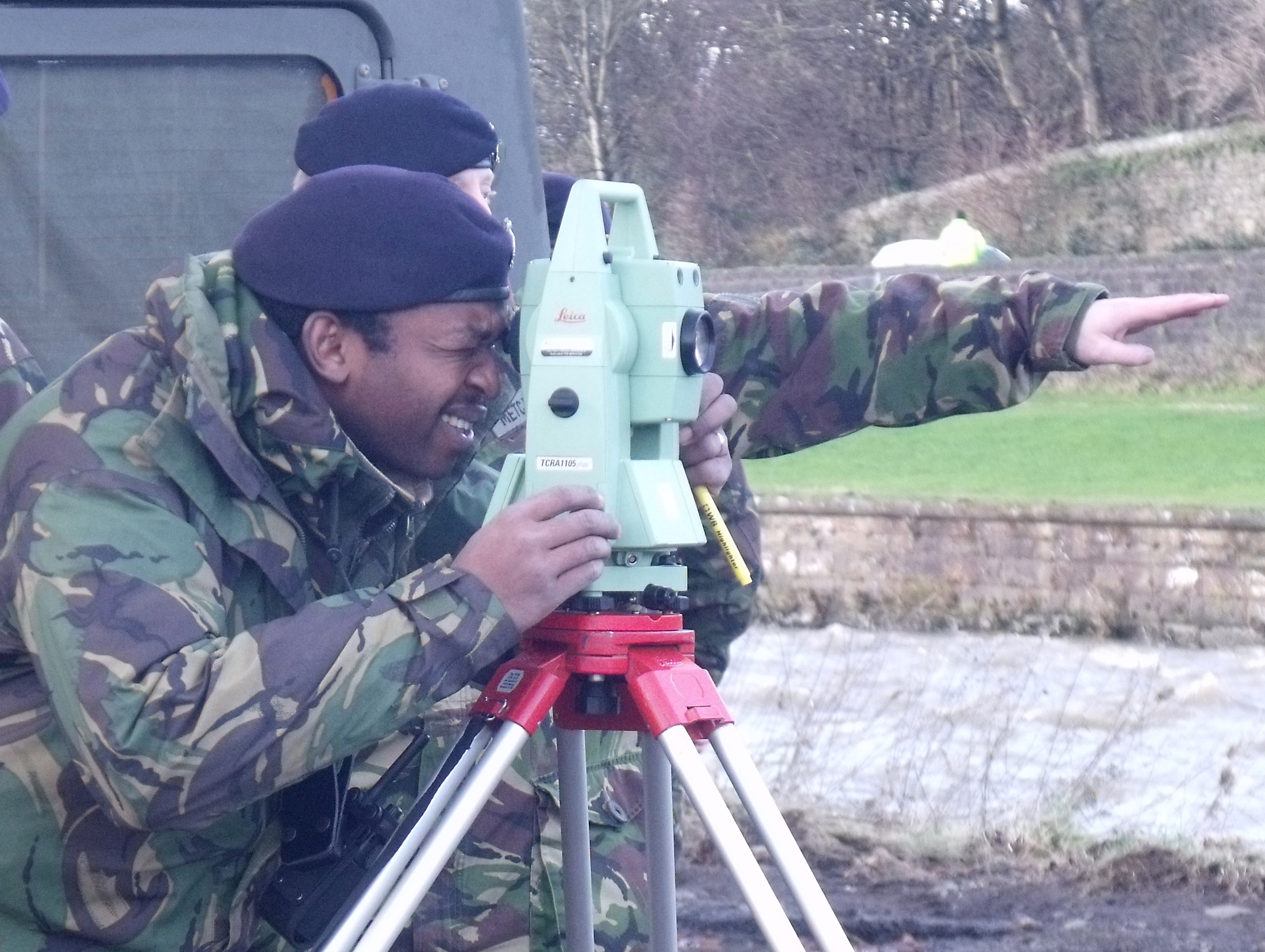
Royal Engineers' Surveyors in Europe

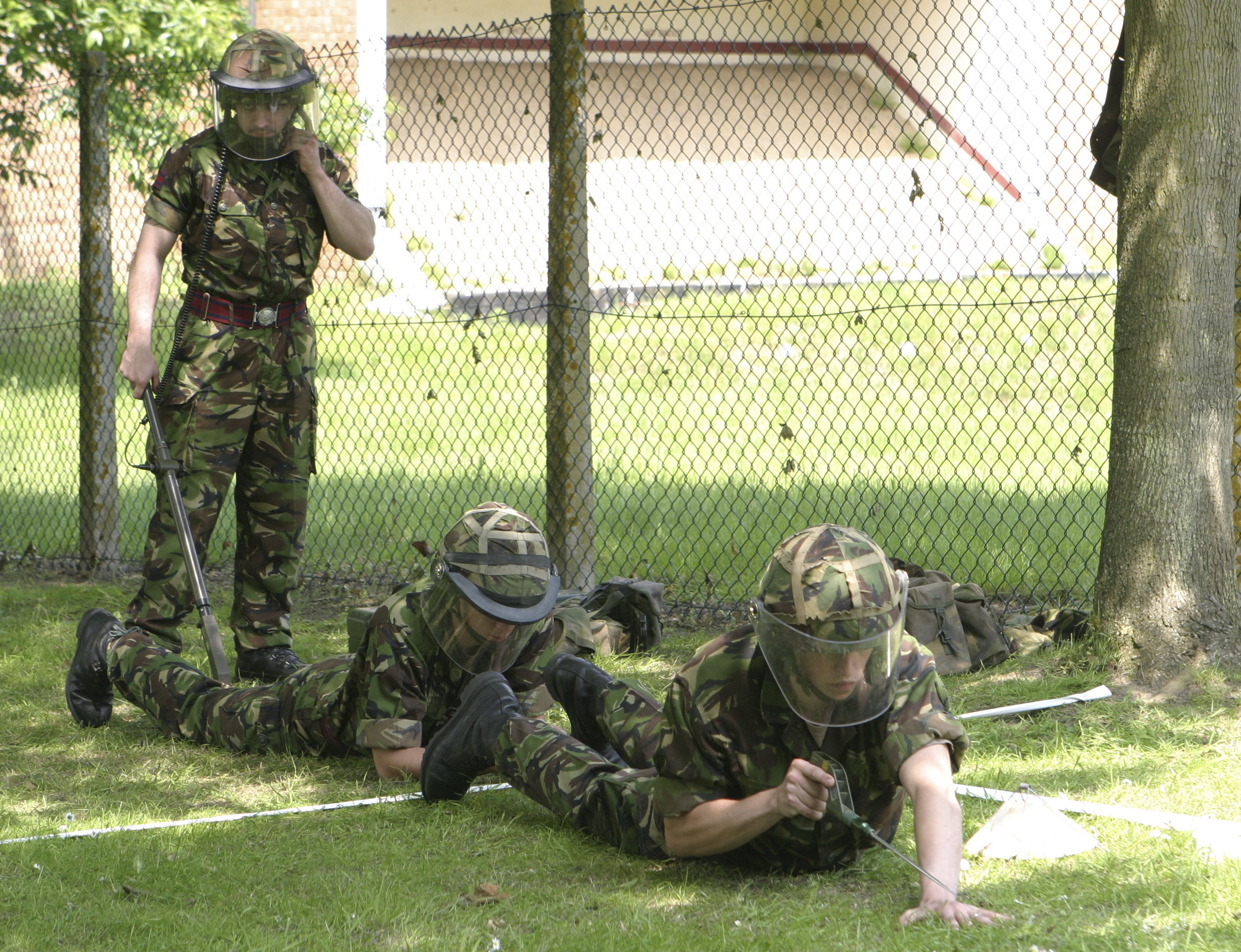
Combat Engineers of 20 Field Squadron, 36 Engineer Regiment practice landmine clearance.

- 8th Engineer Brigade
  - 12 (Force Support) Engineer Group
    - 32 Engineer Regiment
    - 36 Engineer Regiment (Force Support)
    - 39 Engineer Regiment (Air Support)
    - 71 Engineer Regiment (paired with 39 Regiment)
    - 75 Engineer Regiment (paired with 36 Regiment)
    - 42 Headquarters & Support Squadron
      - 20 Works Group (Air Support)
        - 510 Specialist Team Royal Engineers (Airfields) (Army Reserve)
        - 529 Specialist Team Royal Engineers (Air Support)
        - 531 Specialist Team Royal Engineers (Airfields)
        - 532 Specialist Team Royal Engineers (Air Support)
        - 534 Specialist Team Royal Engineers (Airfields)
      - 62 Works Group
        - 508 Specialist Team Royal Engineers (Wks) (Army Reserve)
        - 519 Specialist Team Royal Engineers (Wks)
        - 522 Specialist Team Royal Engineers (Wks)
        - 523 Specialist Team Royal Engineers (Wks)
        - 524 Specialist Team Royal Engineers (Wks)
      - 63 Works Group
        - 517 Specialist Team Royal Engineers (Wks)
        - 518 Specialist Team Royal Engineers (Wks)
        - 525 Specialist Team Royal Engineers (Wks) (Army Reserve)
        - 527 Specialist Team Royal Engineers (Wks)
        - 535 Specialist Team Royal Engineers (Wks)
      - 65 Works Group (Army Reserve)
        - 503 Specialist Team Royal Engineers (FP)
        - 504 Specialist Team Royal Engineers (P)
        - 506 Specialist Team Royal Engineers (W)
        - 507 Specialist Team Royal Engineers (R)
        - 509 Specialist Team Royal Engineers (PI)
        - 526 Specialist Team Royal Engineers (Wks)
      - 66 Works Group (Air Support)
        - 502 Specialist Team Royal Engineers (FP)
        - 516 Specialist Team Royal Engineers (BP)
        - 521 Specialist Team Royal Engineers (WD)
        - 528 Specialist Team Royal Engineers (P)
        - 530 Specialist Team Royal Engineers (M)
  - 29 (Explosive Ordnance Disposal & Search) Engineer Group
    - 29 Explosive Ordnance Disposal and Search Group Support Unit
    - 28 Engineer Regiment (C-CBRN) (Counter-Chemical, biological, radiological and nuclear defence)
    - 33 Engineer Regiment (EOD&S) (Explosive Ordnance Disposal and Search)
    - 35 Engineer Regiment (EOD&S) (Explosive Ordnance Disposal and Search)
    - 101 (City of London) Engineer Regiment (EOD&S) (paired with 33 Regiment)
    - 11 Explosive Ordnance Disposal and Search Regiment RLC
    - 1 Military Working Dog Regiment
- 25 (Close Support) Engineer Group
  - 21 Engineer Regiment
  - 22 Engineer Regiment (supporting 20 ABCT)
  - 26 Engineer Regiment (supporting 12 ABCT)
  - Royal Monmouthshire Royal Engineers

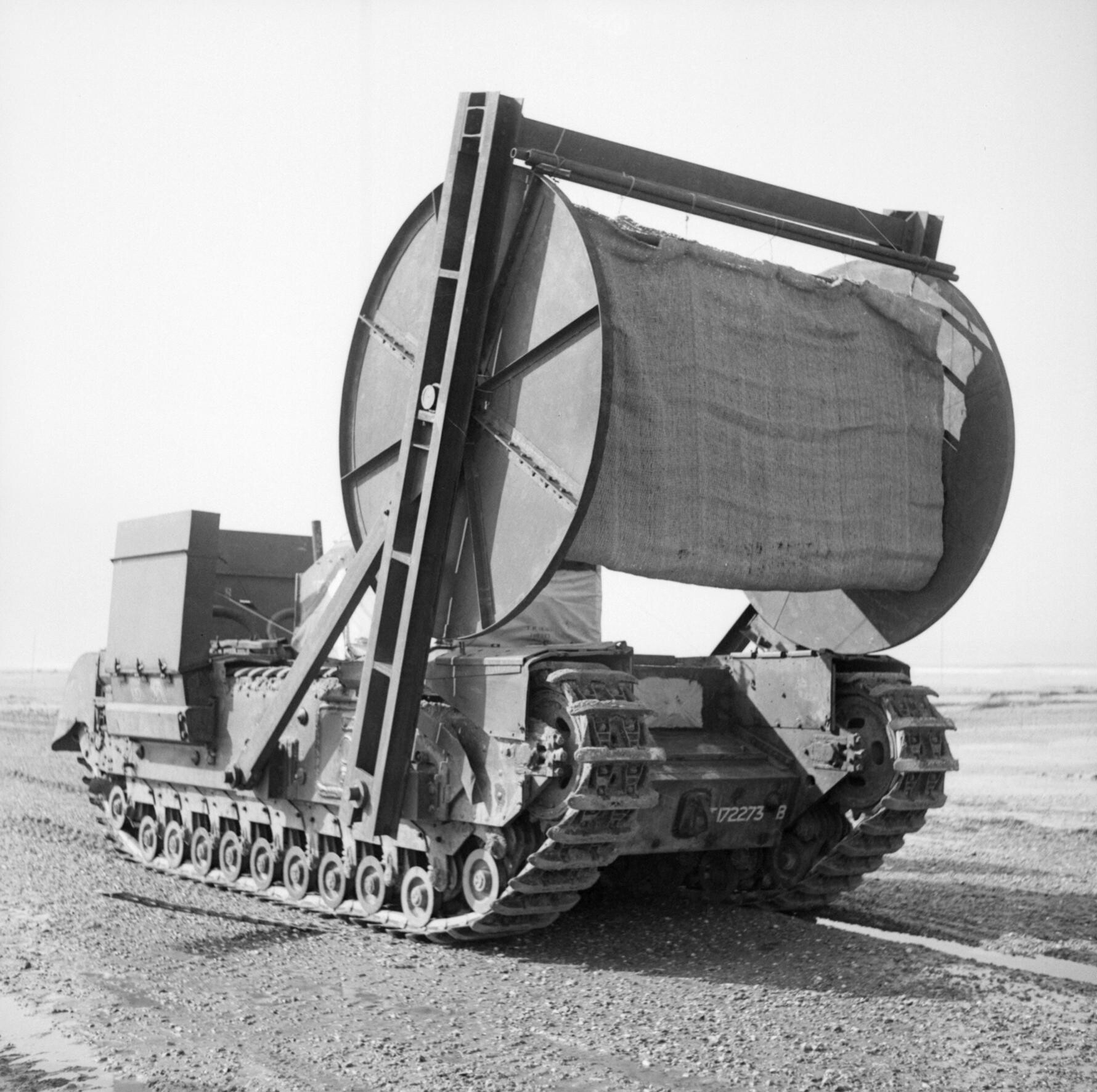
Armoured Vehicle Royal Engineers, Bobin, on D Day

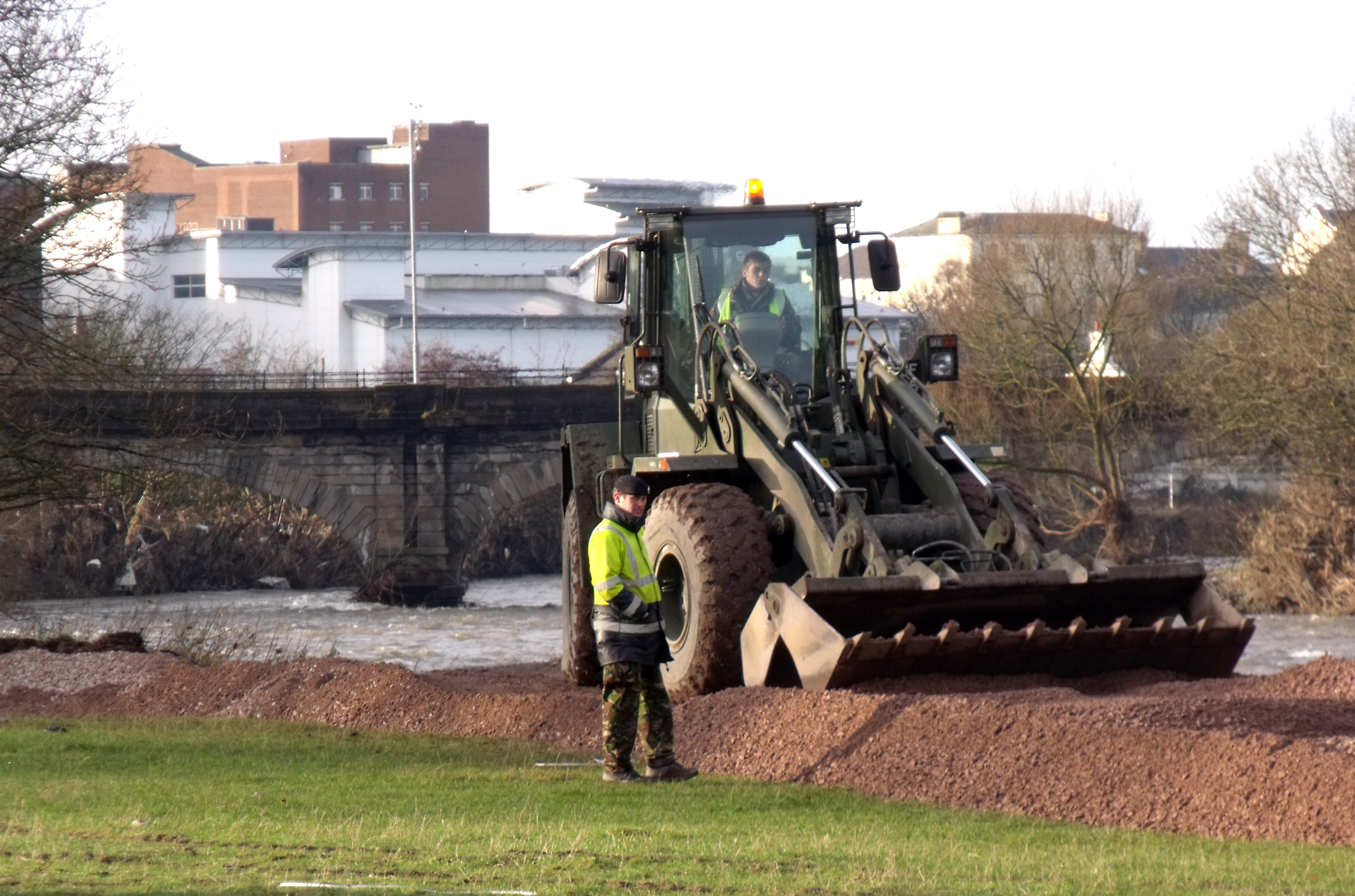
RE Plant Operators construct foundations for a new bridge in Workington after floods

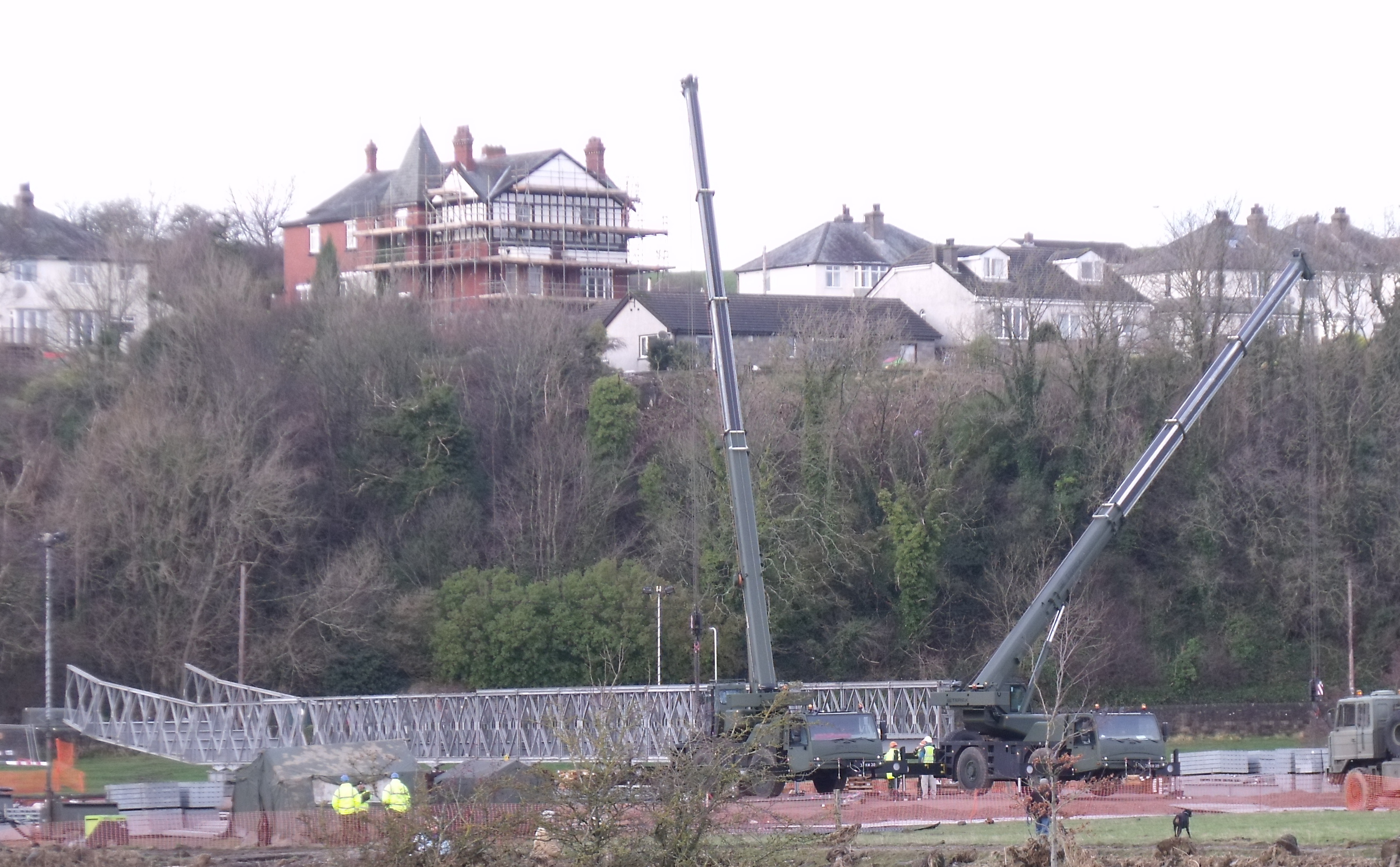
Sappers launching a Logistic Support Bridge at Workington in order to reduce effects of collapsed bridges

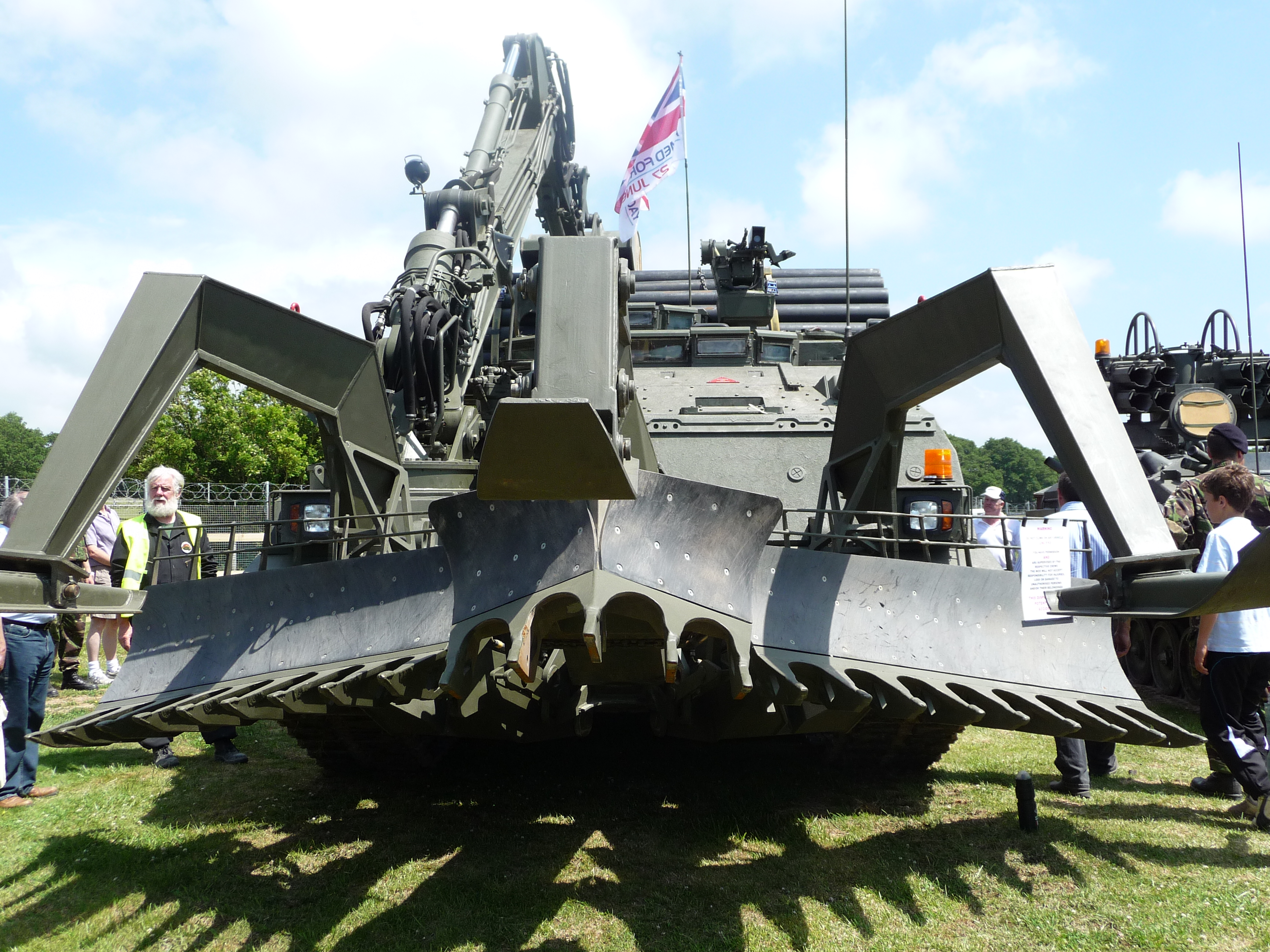
TROJAN AVRE with Full Width Mine Plough and Fascine.

== Regiments ==
Below is a list of the regiments of the Royal Engineers.

- See RSME for 1 RSME Regiment and 3 RSME Regiment
- 21 Engineer Regiment, at Claro Barracks, Ripon
  - Regimental Headquarters
  - 7 Headquarters and Support Squadron
  - 1 Field Squadron
  - 4 Field Squadron
  - 23 Amphibious Engineer Squadron, in Sennelager (from 2021 to present part of German-British Engineer Battalion 130 of the German Army)
  - 29 Field Squadron
- 22 Engineer Regiment, at Swinton Barracks, Perham Down
  - Regimental Headquarters
  - 6 Headquarters and Support Squadron
  - 3 Armoured Engineer Squadron
  - 5 Armoured Engineer Squadron
  - 52 Armoured Engineer Squadron
- 23 Parachute Engineer Regiment, at Rock Barracks, Woodbridge
  - Regimental Headquarters
  - 12 (Nova Scotia) Headquarters and Support Squadron
  - 9 Parachute Squadron
  - 51 Parachute Squadron
  - 299 Parachute Squadron, in Kingston upon Hull
    - No. 1 Parachute Troop, in Kingston upon Hull
    - No. 2 Parachute Troop, in Wakefield
    - No. 2 Parachute Troop, in Pontefract
- 24 Commando Engineer Regiment, at RM Chivenor, Braunton
  - Regimental Headquarters
  - 54 Commando Field Squadron
  - 59 Commando Field Squadron
  - 131 Commando Field Squadron, in Kingsbury, London
    - 300 Troop, in Plymouth
    - 301 Troop, in Sheldon
    - 302 Troop, in Bath
- 26 Engineer Regiment, at Swinton Barracks, Perham Down
  - Regimental Headquarters
  - 38 Headquarters and Support Squadron
  - 8 Armoured Engineer Squadron
  - 30 Armoured Engineer Squadron
  - 33 Armoured Engineer Squadron
- 28 Engineer Regiment (Counter-Chemical, Biological, Radiological, and Nuclear (C-CBRN))
  - Regimental Headquarters, at RAF Honington, Honington
  - 64 Headquarters and Support Squadron (C-CBRN), at RAF Honington, Honington
  - 42 Field Squadron (C-CBRN), at Rock Barracks, Woodbridge
  - 77 Field Squadron (C-CBRN), at Rock Barracks, Woodbridge
  - Falcon (Area Surveillance and Reconnaissance) Squadron, Royal Tank Regiment, at Harman Lines, Warminster Garrison
- 32 Engineer Regiment, at Marne Barracks, Catterick Garrison
  - Regimental Headquarters
  - 2 Headquarters and Support Squadron
  - 26 Field Squadron
  - 31 Field Squadron
  - 37 Field Squadron
- 33 Engineer Regiment (Explosive Ordnance Disposal and Search (EOD&S)), at Carver Barracks, Wimbish
  - Regimental Headquarters
  - 49 Field Squadron (EOD&S)
  - 58 Field Squadron (EOD&S)
  - 821 Field Squadron (EOD&S)
- 35 Engineer Regiment (Explosive Ordnance Disposal and Search (EOD&S)), at Carver Barracks, Wimbish
  - Regimental Headquarters
  - 15 Field Squadron (EOD&S)
  - 17 Field Squadron (EOD&S)
  - 21 Field Squadron (EOD&S)
- 36 Engineer Regiment (Queen's Gurkha Engineers), at Invicta Park Barracks, Maidstone
  - Regimental Headquarters – doubles as RHQ, Queen's Gurkha Engineers
  - 50 Headquarters and Support Squadron
  - 67 (Gurkha) Field Squadron
  - 68 (Gurkha) Field Squadron
  - 69 (Gurkha) Field Squadron
  - 70 (Gurkha) Parachute Squadron
- 39 Engineer Regiment (Air Support), at Kinloss Barracks, Kinloss
  - Regimental Headquarters
  - 60 Headquarters and Support Squadron
  - 65 Field Support Squadron
  - 34 Field Squadron
  - 48 Field Squadron
  - 53 Field Squadron
- 42 Engineer Regiment (Geographic), at RAF Wyton, Wyton
  - Regimental Headquarters and Special Support Team
  - 13 Geographic Squadron
  - 14 Geographic Squadron
  - 16 Geographic Squadron
  - 135 Geographic Squadron, in Ewell and Reading
- 71 Engineer Regiment (Army Reserve)
  - Regimental Headquarters at Leuchars Station
  - 102 (Clyde) Field Squadron, in Paisley and Barnsford Bridge
  - 103 (Tyne Electrical Engineers) Field Squadron, in Newcastle
  - 124 (Lowland) Field Support Squadron, in Cumbernauld, Leuchars, and Kinloss
    - 10 (Orkney) Troop, in Kirkwall
  - 591 (Antrim Artillery) Field Squadron, in Bangor, Northern Ireland
- 75 Engineer Regiment (Army Reserve)
  - 106 (West Riding) Field Squadron (V), at Bailey Barracks, Sheffield
    - 2 Troop, in Sheffield
  - 107 (Lancashire and Cheshire) Field Squadron, in Birkenhead
  - 202 Field Squadron, in Manchester
    - Manx Troop, in Douglas, Isle of Man
  - 350 Field Squadron (EOD), in Chesterfield
- 101 (City of London) Engineer Regiment (EOD) (Army Reserve):
  - 217 Field Squadron (EOD), in Ilford and Southend)
  - 221 Field Squadron (EOD), in Bexleyheath and Catford)
  - 579 Field Squadron (EOD), in Tunbridge Wells, Rochester and Redhill)
- Royal Monmouthshire Royal Engineers (Militia)
  - Regimental Headquarters Troop, at Monmouth Castle
  - 100 Field Squadron, in Cwmbran, Bristol, Cardiff, and Swansea
  - 225 (City of Birmingham) Field Squadron, in Birmingham. 1 troop at Stoke, 2 troop at Cannock, 3 troop and squadron headquarters at Oldbury.
  - Jersey Field Squadron, in St Helier. With a troop at Guernsey.

All regiments also have a Light Aid Detachment (LAD) provided by Royal Electrical and Mechanical Engineers.

== See also (previous units) ==
- 1st Assault Brigade Royal Engineers
- Tunnelling companies of the Royal Engineers
- Air Battalion Royal Engineers
