= Army 2020 =

Early-to-mid 2010s reorganisation of the British Army

Army 2020 is the restructuring of the British Army in the early and mid-2010s, in light of the Strategic Defence and Security Review 2010. The plan, as its name suggested, was intended to be completed by 2020, though most of its reorganisations were completed by the middle of the decade. It was succeeded by Army 2020 Refine, a series of new changes and refinements of Army 2020's restructuring, conducted in light of the Strategic Defence and Security Review 2015.

== Background ==
The British government gave an indication of its proposals for the future structure of the Army in early 2008, in a press report stating that it was considering restructuring the Army into a force of three deployable divisional headquarters and eight "homogenous or identical" brigades, each with a spread of heavy, medium and light capabilities. This report indicated that the existing 16 Air Assault Brigade would be retained as a high-readiness rapid reaction force.

Subsequently, it was reported that the former Chief of the General Staff, General Sir Richard Dannatt, wanted to see the Army structured so as to extend the interval between operational tours from two years to two-and-a-half years.

In 2010, the Strategic Defence and Security Review was published. As part of the plans, the British Army would be reduced by 23 regular units, and by 2020 would number 117,000 soldiers, of whom 82,000 would be regulars and 30,000 would be reservists. The Strategic Defence and Security Review 2015 increased the planned number of reservists from 30,000 to 35,000.

== Originally envisaged structure ==
The originally envisaged future structure was announced on 19 July 2011 in a briefing paper entitled Defence Basing Review: Headline Decisions. This structure had five identical multi-role brigades, each of around 6,500 personnel. However, in June 2012 a significantly different structure known as "Army 2020" was announced.

The divisional headquarters of 2nd, 4th, and 5th Divisions were disbanded in 2012 and replaced by a single formation known as Support Command, based at Aldershot.

The five multi-role brigades envisaged in 2011 would have comprised:

- One armoured regiment of Challenger 2 tanks
- One armoured reconnaissance regiment
- One armoured infantry battalion of Warrior armoured fighting vehicles
- One mechanised infantry battalion of FV432 armoured personnel carriers
- Two light role infantry battalions

Combat Support and Logistics would have been retained at divisional level. It was envisaged that 19th Light Brigade, then part of 3rd Mechanised Division, would be disbanded.

== Structure ==
=== Reaction Force ===
The 16 Air Assault Brigade, comprising two battalions of the Parachute Regiment and two Army Air Corps regiments of attack helicopters. This would deliver a very high readiness Lead Air Assault Task Force, with the rest of the brigade ready to move at longer notice.

The 3rd (UK) Mechanised Division, renamed the 3rd (United Kingdom) Division, comprising three armoured infantry brigades: 1st Armoured Infantry Brigade, 12th Armoured Infantry Brigade and 20th Armoured Infantry Brigade. These three brigades would rotate, with one being the lead brigade, a second undergoing training and the third involved in other tasks. The lead brigade would deliver a Lead Battlegroup at very high readiness, with the rest of the brigade at longer notice.

The complete air assault brigade and a full mechanised brigade would be available for deployment within three months. All three brigade's HQs are to be based in the Salisbury Plain Training Area.

Reaction Force – Originally Envisaged Structure

- 3rd (United Kingdom) Division, at Bulford Camp
  - Royal Wessex Yeomanry, at Bovington Camp
  - 1st Armoured Infantry Brigade, at Tidworth Camp
    - Household Cavalry Regiment, at Victoria Barracks, Windsor
    - Royal Tank Regiment, at Tidworth Camp
    - 1st Battalion, Royal Regiment of Fusiliers, at Tidworth Camp
    - 1st Battalion, Mercian Regiment, at Bulford Camp
    - 4th Battalion, The Rifles, at Aldershot Garrison
  - 12th Armoured Infantry Brigade, at Bulford Camp
    - Royal Lancers, at Catterick Garrison
    - King's Royal Hussars, at Tidworth Camp
    - 1st Battalion, Yorkshire Regiment, at Battlesbury Barracks, Warminster
    - 1st Battalion, Royal Welsh, at Tidworth Camp
    - 1st Battalion, Scots Guards, at Aldershot Garrison
  - 20th Armoured Infantry Brigade, at Bulford Camp
    - Royal Dragoon Guards, at Catterick Garrison
    - Queen's Royal Hussars, at Tidworth Camp
    - 5th Battalion, The Rifles, at Bulford Camp
    - 1st Battalion, Princess of Wales's Royal Regiment, at Bulford Camp
    - The Highlanders, 4th Battalion, Royal Regiment of Scotland, at Catterick Garrison
  - 101 Logistic Brigade, at Aldershot Garrison
    - 1 Regiment, Royal Logistic Corps, at St David's Barracks, Bicester
    - 3 Regiment, Royal Logistic Corps, at Aldershot Garrison
    - 4 Regiment, Royal Logistic Corps, at Dalton Barracks, Abingdon-on-Thames
    - 9 Regiment, Royal Logistic Corps, at Buckley Barracks, Hullavington
    - 10 Queen's Own Gurkha Logistic Regiment, Royal Logistic Corps, at Aldershot Garrison
    - 27 Regiment, Royal Logistic Corps, at Dalton Barracks, Abingdon-on-Thames
    - 151 Transport Regiment, Royal Logistic Corps, at Croydon
    - 154 (Scottish) Transport Regiment, Royal Logistic Corps, at Dunfermline
    - 156 Supply Regiment, Royal Logistic Corps, at Liverpool
    - 157 (Welsh) Transport Regiment, Royal Logistic Corps, at Cardiff
    - 1 Armoured Medical Regiment, Royal Army Medical Corps, at Tidworth Camp
    - 4 Armoured Medical Regiment, Royal Army Medical Corps, at Aldershot Garrison
    - 5 Armoured Medical Regiment, Royal Army Medical Corps, at Tidworth Camp
    - 3 Armoured Close Support Battalion, Royal Electrical and Mechanical Engineers, at Tidworth Camp
    - 4 Armoured Close Support Battalion, Royal Electrical and Mechanical Engineers, at Tidworth Camp
    - 5 Force Support Battalion, Royal Electrical and Mechanical Engineers, at Kendrew Barracks, Cottesmore
    - 6 Armoured Close Support Battalion, Royal Electrical and Mechanical Engineers, at Tidworth Camp
- 16 Air Assault Brigade, at Colchester Garrison
  - 2nd Battalion, Parachute Regiment, at Colchester Garrison
  - 3rd Battalion, Parachute Regiment, at Colchester Garrison
  - 4th Battalion, Parachute Regiment, at Pudsey
  - 3 Regiment, Army Air Corps, at Wattisham Airfield
  - 4 Regiment, Army Air Corps, at Wattisham Airfield
  - 6 Regiment, Army Air Corps, at Bury St Edmunds
  - 7th Parachute Regiment, Royal Horse Artillery, at Colchester Garrison
  - 23 Engineer Regiment (Air Assault), Royal Engineers, at Rock Barracks, Suffolk
  - 13 (Air Assault) Support Regiment, Royal Logistic Corps, at Colchester Garrison
  - 16 Medical Regiment, Royal Army Medical Corps, at Colchester Garrison
  - 7 (Air Assault) Battalion, Royal Electrical and Mechanical Engineers, at Wattisham Airfield
  - 216 (Parachute) Signal Squadron, Royal Signals, at Colchester Garrison

=== Adaptable Force ===
The 1st Armoured Division, renamed as the 1st (United Kingdom) Division, along with Support Command. Comprises seven infantry brigades (4th, 7th, 11th, 38th, 42nd, 51st and 160th) of various sizes, each made up of paired regular and Territorial Army forces, drawn from an Adaptable Force pool of units. These infantry brigades were planned to be suited to domestic operations or overseas commitments (such as the Falkland Islands, Brunei and Cyprus) or, with sufficient notice, as a brigade level contribution to enduring stabilisation operations.

Adaptable Force – Originally Envisaged Structure

- 1st (United Kingdom) Division, at Imphal Barracks, York
  - 4th Infantry Brigade and Headquarters North East, at Catterick Garrison
    - Light Dragoons, at Catterick Garrison
    - Queen's Own Yeomanry, at Fenham Barracks, York
    - 2nd Battalion, Yorkshire Regiment, at Catterick Garrison
    - 4th Battalion, Yorkshire Regiment, at Worsley Barracks, York
  - 7th Infantry Brigade and Headquarters East, at Chetwynd Barracks, Chilwell
    - 1st The Queen's Dragoon Guards, at Robertson Barracks, Swanton Morley
    - Royal Yeomanry, at Fulham House, Fulham
    - 1st Battalion, Royal Anglian Regiment, at Royal Artillery Barracks, Woolwich
    - 2nd Battalion, Royal Anglian Regiment, at Kendrew Barracks, Cottesmore
    - 3rd Battalion, Royal Anglian Regiment, at Bury St Edmunds
    - 1st Battalion, Royal Irish Regiment, at Clive Barracks, Ternhill
    - 2nd Battalion, Royal Irish Regiment, at Thiepval Barracks, Lisburn
    - 3rd Battalion, Princess of Wales's Royal Regiment, at Canterbury
  - 11th Infantry Brigade and Headquarters South East, at Aldershot Garrison
    - 1st Battalion, Welsh Guards, at Elizabeth Barracks, Pirbright
    - 1st Battalion, Grenadier Guards, at Aldershot Garrison
    - 1st Battalion, Royal Gurkha Rifles, at Shorncliffe Army Camp, Kent
    - 3rd Battalion, Royal Welsh, at Maindy Barracks, Cardiff
    - The London Regiment, at St John's Hill Drill Hall, Battersea
  - 38th (Irish) Brigade, at Thiepval Barracks, Lisburn
    - Royal Scots Borderers, 1st Battalion, Royal Regiment of Scotland, at Palace Barracks, Holywood
    - 2nd Battalion, The Rifles, at Abercorn Barracks, Ballykinler
    - 7th Battalion, The Rifles, at Reading
  - 42nd Infantry Brigade and Headquarters North West, at Fulwood Barracks, Preston
    - 2nd Battalion, Mercian Regiment, at Dale Barracks, Upton-by-Chester
    - 4th Battalion, Mercian Regiment, at Wolverhampton
    - 2nd Battalion, Duke of Lancaster's Regiment, at Weeton Barracks, Weeton-with-Preese
    - 4th Battalion, Duke of Lancaster's Regiment, at Kimberley Barracks, Preston
  - 51st Infantry Brigade and Headquarters Scotland, at Redford Barracks, Edinburgh
    - Royal Scots Dragoon Guards, at Leuchars Station, Leuchars
    - Royal Mercian and Lancastrian Yeomanry (to change to a new title, with sub-units in Scotland and Northern Ireland), at Redford Barracks, Edinburgh
    - 3rd Battalion, The Rifles, at Dreghorn Barracks, Edinburgh
    - Royal Highland Fusiliers, 2nd Battalion, Royal Regiment of Scotland, at Edinburgh
    - Black Watch, 3rd Battalion, Royal Regiment of Scotland, at Fort George, Ardersier
    - 52nd Lowland, 6th Battalion, Royal Regiment of Scotland, at Walcheren Barracks, Glasgow
    - 51st Highland, 7th Battalion, Royal Regiment of Scotland, at Queen's Barracks, Perth
    - 5th Battalion, Royal Regiment of Fusiliers, at Newcastle
  - 160th Infantry Brigade and Headquarters Wales, at The Barracks, Brecon
    - 1st Battalion, The Rifles, at Beachley Barracks, Chepstow
    - 6th Battalion, The Rifles, at Wyvern Barracks, Exeter
  - 102 Logistic Brigade, at Prince William of Gloucester Barracks, Grantham
    - 6 Regiment, Royal Logistic Corps, at Dishforth Airfield, North Yorkshire
    - 7 Regiment, Royal Logistic Corps, at Kendrew Barracks, Cottesmore
    - 150 Transport Regiment, Royal Logistic Corps, at Kingston upon Hull
    - 158 Transport Regiment, Royal Logistic Corps, at Peterborough
    - 159 Supply Regiment, Royal Logistic Corps, at Coventry
    - 2 Medical Regiment, Royal Army Medical Corps, at St George's Barracks, North Luffenham
    - 3 Medical Regiment, at Fulwood Barracks, Preston
    - 225 (Scottish) Medical Regiment, Royal Army Medical Corps, at Dundee
    - 253 (North Irish) Medical Regiment, Royal Army Medical Corps, at Belfast
    - 254 (East of England) Medical Regiment, Royal Army Medical Corps, at Cambridge
    - 1 Close Support Battalion, Royal Electrical and Mechanical Engineers, at Catterick Garrison
    - 2 Close Support Battalion, Royal Electrical and Mechanical Engineers, at Leuchars Station, Leuchars
    - 101 Battalion, Royal Electrical and Mechanical Engineers, at Wrexham
    - 102 Battalion, Royal Electrical and Mechanical Engineers, at Newton Aycliffe
    - 104 Battalion, Royal Electrical and Mechanical Engineers, at Northampton
    - 106 Battalion, Royal Electrical and Mechanical Engineers, at Glasgow
- British Forces Cyprus
  - 1st Battalion, Duke of Lancaster's Regiment (rotates between 1 LANCS, 2 LANCS, and 2 YORKS, on a two year duty)
  - 2nd Battalion, Princess of Wales's Royal Regiment (rotates between 2 PWRR, 1 R ANGLIAN, and 2 R ANGLIAN, on a two year duty)
- British Forces Brunei
  - 2nd Battalion, Royal Gurkha Rifles (rotates between 1 RGR and 2 RGR)
- State Ceremonial and Public duties
  - Balaklava Company, Argyll and Sutherland Highlanders, 5th Battalion, Royal Regiment of Scotland, at Redford Barracks, Edinburgh
  - Household Cavalry Mounted Regiment, at Hyde Park Barracks, Knightsbridge
  - King's Troop, Royal Horse Artillery, at Royal Artillery Barracks, Woolwich
  - 1st Battalion, Coldstream Guards, at Victoria Barracks, Windsor
  - 1st Battalion, Irish Guards, at Cavalry Barracks, Hounslow
  - Nijmegen Company, Grenadier Guards, at Wellington Barracks, Westminster
  - No. 7 Company, Coldstream Guards, at Wellington Barracks, Westminster
  - F Company, Scots Guards, at Wellington Barracks, Westminster

=== Force Troops Command ===
Force Troops Command – Originally Envisaged Structure

- 1st Artillery Brigade and Headquarters South West, at Tidworth Camp
  - 1st Regiment, Royal Horse Artillery, at Larkhill Garrison
  - 3rd Regiment, Royal Horse Artillery, at Albemarle Barracks, Northumberland
  - 4th Regiment, Royal Artillery, at Alanbrooke Barracks, Topcliffe
  - 19th Regiment, Royal Artillery, at Larkhill Garrison
  - 26th Regiment, Royal Artillery, at Larkhill Garrison
  - 101st (Northumbrian) Regiment, Royal Artillery, at Gateshead
  - 103rd (Lancashire Artillery Volunteers) Regiment, Royal Artillery, at St Helens
  - 105th Regiment, Royal Artillery, at Redford Barracks, Edinburgh
- 8th Engineer Brigade, at Gibraltar Barracks, Minley
  - 12 (Force Support) Engineer Group, at RAF Wittering, Peterborough
    - 20 Works Group Royal Engineers (Air Support), at RAF Wittering, Peterborough
    - 36 Engineer Regiment, Royal Engineers, at Invicta Park Barracks, Maidstone
    - 39 Engineer Regiment, Royal Engineers, at Kinloss Barracks, Kinloss
    - 71 Engineer Regiment, Royal Engineers, at Leuchars Station, Leuchars
    - 75 Engineer Regiment, Royal Engineers, at Peninsula Barracks, Warrington
  - 25 (Close Support) Engineer Group, at Gibraltar Barracks, Minley
    - 21 Engineer Regiment, Royal Engineers, at Catterick Garrison
    - 22 Engineer Regiment, Royal Engineers, at Swinton Barracks, Perham Down
    - 26 Engineer Regiment, Royal Engineers, at Swinton Barracks, Perham Down
    - 32 Engineer Regiment, Royal Engineers, at Catterick Garrison
    - 35 Engineer Regiment, Royal Engineers, at Swinton Barracks, Perham Down
  - 29 (Explosive Ordnance Disposal and Search) Group, at Aldershot Garrison
    - 1st Military Working Dog Regiment, Royal Army Veterinary Corps, at St George's Barracks, North Luffenham
    - 11 Explosive Ordnance Disposal Regiment, Royal Logistic Corps, at Vauxhall Barracks, Didcot
    - 33 Engineer Regiment (Explosive Ordnance Disposal), Royal Engineers, at Carver Barracks, Wimbish
    - 101 (City of London) Engineer Regiment (Explosive Ordnance Disposal), Royal Engineers, at Carver Barracks, Wimbish
  - 170 (Infrastructure Support) Engineer Group, at Chetwynd Barracks, Chilwell
    - 62 Works Group Royal Engineers, at Chetwynd Barracks, Chilwell
    - 63 Works Group Royal Engineers, at Chetwynd Barracks, Chilwell
    - 64 Works Group Royal Engineers, at Chetwynd Barracks, Chilwell
    - 65 Works Group Royal Engineers, at Chetwynd Barracks, Chilwell
    - 66 Works Group Royal Engineers, at Chetwynd Barracks, Chilwell
    - Royal Monmouthshire Royal Engineers (Militia), at Monmouth Castle, Monmouth
- 1st Signal Brigade, at Imjin Barracks, Innsworth
  - 299 Signal Squadron (Special Communications), Royal Signals, at Bletchley
  - 22nd Signal Regiment, Royal Signals, at Beacon Barracks, Stafford
  - 30th Signal Regiment, Royal Signals, at Gamecock Barracks, Bramcote
  - ARRC Support Battalion, at Imjin Barracks, Innsworth
- 11th Signal Brigade and Headquarters West Midlands, at Venning Barracks, Donnington
  - 2nd Signal Group, at Venning Barracks, Donnington
    - 10th Signal Regiment, Royal Signals, at MoD Corsham, Corsham
    - 15th Signal Regiment (Information Support), Royal Signals, at Blandford Camp
    - 32nd (Scottish) Signal Regiment, Royal Signals, at Glasgow
    - 37th Signal Regiment, Royal Signals, at Redditch
    - 39th (Skinners) Signal Regiment, Royal Signals, at Bristol
    - 71st (City of London) Yeomanry Signal Regiment, Royal Signals, at Bexleyheath
  - 7th Signal Group, at Beacon Barracks, Stafford
    - 1st Signal Regiment, Royal Signals, at Beacon Barracks, Stafford
    - 2nd Signal Regiment, Royal Signals, at Imphal Barracks, York
    - 3rd Signal Regiment, Royal Signals, at Bulford Camp
    - 16th Signal Regiment, Royal Signals, at Beacon Barracks, Stafford
    - 21st Signal Regiment, Royal Signals, at Azimghur Barracks, Colerne
  - 104th Logistic Support Brigade, at Duke of Gloucester Barracks, South Cerney
    - 2 Operational Support Group, Royal Logistic Corps, at Prince William of Gloucester Barracks, Grantham
    - 17 Port and Maritime Regiment, Royal Logistic Corps, at McMullen Barracks, Marchwood Military Port
    - 29 Regiment, Royal Logistic Corps, at Duke of Gloucester Barracks, South Cerney
    - 152 Fuel Support Regiment, Royal Logistic Corps, at Belfast
    - 162 Postal Courier and Movement Control Regiment, Royal Logistic Corps, at Nottingham
    - 165 (Wessex) Port and Enabling Regiment, Royal Logistic Corps, at Plymouth
    - 167 Catering Support Regiment, Royal Logistic Corps, at Prince William of Gloucester Barracks, Grantham
  - 2nd Medical Brigade, at Queen Elizabeth Barracks, Strensall
    - 22 Field Hospital, at Aldershot Garrison
    - 33 Field Hospital, at Fort Blockhouse, Gosport
    - 34 Field Hospital, at Queen Elizabeth Barracks, Strensall
    - 201 (Northern) Field Hospital, at Fenham Barracks, Newcastle upon Tyne
    - 202 (Midlands) Field Hospital, at Birmingham
    - 203 (Welsh) Field Hospital, at Cardiff
    - 204 (North Irish) Field Hospital, at Belfast
    - 205 (Scottish) Field Hospital, at Gordon Barracks, Aberdeen
    - 207 (Manchester) Field Hospital, at Manchester
    - 208 (Liverpool) Field Hospital, at Liverpool
    - 212 (Yorkshire) Field Hospital, at Endcliffe Hall, Sheffield
    - 243 (The Wessex) Field Hospital, at Bristol
    - 256 (City of London) Field Hospital, at Braganza Street drill hall, Walworth
    - 306 Hospital Support Regiment, at Queen Elizabeth Barracks, Strensall
    - 335 Medical Evacuation Regiment, at Queen Elizabeth Barracks, Strensall
    - Operational HQ Support Group, at Queen Elizabeth Barracks, Strensall
  - 1st Intelligence and Surveillance Brigade, at Trenchard Lines, Upavon
    - 5th Regiment, Royal Artillery, at Catterick Garrison
    - 32nd Regiment, Royal Artillery, at Larkhill Garrison
    - 47th Regiment, Royal Artillery, at Larkhill Garrison
    - 104th Regiment, Royal Artillery, at Raglan Barracks, Newport
    - Honourable Artillery Company, at Finsbury Barracks, London
    - 14th Signal Regiment (Electronic Warafre), Royal Signals, at MOD St Athan, St Athan
    - 1 Military Intelligence Battalion, at Catterick Garrison
    - 2 Military Intelligence Battalion, at Trenchard Lines, Upavon
    - 3 Military Intelligence Battalion, at Hackney
    - 4 Military Intelligence Battalion, at Bulford Camp
    - 5 Military Intelligence Battalion, at Edinburgh
    - 6 Military Intelligence Battalion, at Manchester
    - 7 Military Intelligence Battalion, at Bristol
    - Land Intelligence Fusion Centre, at Denison Barracks, Hermitage
    - Defence Cultural Specialist Unit, at Denison Barracks, Hermitage
    - Specialist Group Military Intelligence, at Denison Barracks, Hermitage
  - Security Assistance Group, at Denison Barracks, Hermitage
    - Military Stabilisation Support Group, at Denison Barracks, Hermitage
    - 15 Psychological Operations Group, at Denison Barracks, Hermitage
    - Media Operations Group, at London
  - 1st Military Police Brigade, at Marlborough Lines, Andover
    - 1 Regiment, Royal Military Police, at Catterick Garrison
    - 3 Regiment, Royal Military Police, at Bulford Camp
    - 4 Regiment, Royal Military Police, at Aldershot Garrison
    - Special Investigation Branch Regiment, Royal Military Police, at Bulford Camp
    - Special Operations Unit, Royal Military Police, at Longmoor Military Camp
    - Military Corrective Training Centre, at Colchester Garrison

The boxes above provides the general structure of the British Army once Army 2020 is completed. It excludes units under Regional Command, Recruiting and Training Command, or units under other commands such as the air defence regiments.

The term "Regional Point of Command," encompassing organisations such as Headquarters North East, also appears to have been introduced under the reorganisations.

== Changes to units ==
=== Royal Armoured Corps ===
Four of the Royal Armoured Corps' Regiments were merged into two regiments:

- 9th/12th Royal Lancers and Queen's Royal Lancers merged to become The Royal Lancers
- 1st Royal Tank Regiment and 2nd Royal Tank Regiment merged to form the Royal Tank Regiment.

=== Royal Artillery ===
39 Regiment Royal Artillery was disbanded, with its Multiple Launch Rocket Systems being transferred to the rest of the Royal Artillery and Territorial Army.

In accordance with the Strategic Defence and Security Review, the number of AS-90 self-propelled guns was reduced by 35%. The number of active Challenger 2 tanks was cut by around forty per cent, and by 2014 had been reduced to 227.

12th and 16th Royal Artillery would continue to be placed under a joint Army-RAF unit, the Joint Ground Based Air Defence Headquarters.

=== Infantry ===
Four of the British Army's 36 regular infantry battalions were disbanded or merged with sister units in their regiments:

- 2nd Battalion, Royal Regiment of Fusiliers (light role)
- 3rd Battalion, Yorkshire Regiment (Green Howards) (light role)
- 2nd Battalion, Royal Welsh (Royal Regiment of Wales) (armoured infantry)
- 3rd Battalion, Mercian Regiment (Staffords) (armoured infantry)

A fifth battalion, the Argyll and Sutherland Highlanders, 5th Battalion Royal Regiment of Scotland, was reduced to a single company to carry out public duties in Scotland.

However, through the 2020 reforms, 3 new battalions of infantry (1 regular, 2 reserve) were created including:

- 3rd Battalion, Royal Gurkha Rifles (specialist infantry)
- 4th Battalion, Princess of Wales's Royal Regiment (Army Reserve)
- 8th Battalion, The Rifles (Army Reserve)

=== Joint Helicopter Command/Army Air Corps ===
The Joint Helicopter Command remained an integral part of the land force. The Army Air Corps was reduced by one regular regiment. 1 and 9 Regt AAC merged, operating the new Wildcat helicopter. One Regiment would remain at high readiness annually, with one Apache Squadron committed towards the Lead Armoured Battlegroup. 653 AAC to be an Operational Training Squadron from 2015, leaving the Apache Regiments with four active squadrons altogether. The government pledged to upgrade 50 AgustaWestland Apache to AH-64E standard; however, an 11 May 2017 U.S. government contract list stated only 38 would be re-manufactured.

=== Army Reserve ===
The Territorial Army was renamed the Army Reserve, and expanded from 19,000 to 30,000 personnel. Its military equipment was to be upgraded to meet the standards of the regular army and its units were realigned. The 2015 review increased the intended strength of the Reserves to 35,000.

=== Corps of Royal Electrical and Mechanical Engineers ===
The regular component of the Royal Electrical and Mechanical Engineers structure was reduced by one battalion to seven regular battalions.

=== Royal Military Police ===
As part of the drawdown from Germany, the Royal Military Police lost one regiment, 4 Regiment RMP, with all provost companies re-subordinating. The three remaining regiments were re-organised.

=== Other ===
British Forces Royal Logistic Corps in Germany were announced to be withdrawn back to the UK by 2015:

- 8 Regiment RLC disbanded (formerly at BFG Munster and late York Barracks) on 31 March 2012.
- 24 Regiment RLC (part of 104th Logistic Support Brigade) disbanded in Bielefeld, Germany in August 2013.
- 23 Pioneer Regiment RLC (part of 104th Logistic Support Brigade) at Bicester disbanded in 2013/14.

== Basing ==
An initial basing plan located infantry brigades throughout the United Kingdom, with the three reaction force brigades situated in the Salisbury Plain Training Area. On 5 March 2013, a future basing plan of units in the UK was released. All Germany-based units were relocated to the UK, with the Salisbury Plain area holding the largest concentration of troops.
