= 8th Engineer Brigade =

8 Engineer Brigade 8 Force Engineer Brigade Headquarters Royal Engineers, Theatre Troops
- Formation badge of the brigade
- Active: 2005 – present
- Country: United Kingdom
- Branch: British Army
- Type: Support formation
- Role: Military Engineering
- Size: Brigade
- Part of: Allied Rapid Reaction Corps
- Brigade HQ: Gibraltar Barracks, Minley
- Engagements: Operation Telic; Operation Herrick; Operation Rescript
- Website: 8th Engineer Brigade

8th Engineer Brigade (8 Eng Bde) is an engineering support formation of the British Army, under the command of HQ Allied Rapid Reaction Corps, supporting NATO.

== History ==
In August 2001, Headquarters Royal Engineers, Theatre Troops was established as a subdivision of HQ Theatre Troops based in Upavon. On 1 April 2005, the headquarters was redesignated as part of the LANDmark review as 8th Force Engineer Brigade and subsequently took control of the three engineer groups: 12th (Air Support), 29th (Explosive Ordnance Disposal and Search), and 170th (Infrastructure Support) Engineer Groups. The new brigade's headquarters was also based at Upavon, now at Trenchard Lines.

As part of the Army 2020 reorganisation following the Strategic Defence and Security Review 2010, HQ Theatre Troops was redesignated as Force Troops Command, while the brigade headquarters was moved to Gibraltar Barracks in Minley and subsequently took control of 25th (Close Support) Engineer Group. However, in 2016 as part of the subsequent Army 2020 Refine changes, 25 Engineer Group was moved under direct control of 3rd (United Kingdom) Division. Consequently, two regiments of 25 Engineer Group; 32nd and 35th Engineer Regiments were moved under 12 Engineer Group.

In August 2020, a reorganisation of the Field Army, the brigade was moved under control of 1st (United Kingdom) Division. The brigade has been also regionally aligned with the South Asian region as part of defence engagement.

In 2024, the brigade was resubordinated to HQ Allied Rapid Reaction Corps, supporting the NATO High Readiness Force (Land).

== Structure ==
The current structure of the brigade is as follows:

- Headquarters, 8 Engineer Brigade, at Gibraltar Barracks, Minley
  - 8 Engineer Brigade Combat Information Systems (CIS) Troop, Royal Engineers (V), at Aldershot Garrison
  - 12 (Force Support) Engineer Group, at RAF Wittering, Cambridgeshire
    - 32 Engineer Regiment, Royal Engineers, at Marne Barracks, Catterick Garrison
    - 36 Engineer Regiment, Royal Engineers, at Invicta Park Barracks, Maidstone — regiment doubles as HQ Queen's Gurkha Engineers
    - 39 Engineer Regiment, Royal Engineers, at Kinloss Barracks, Kinloss
    - 71 Engineer Regiment, Royal Engineers (V), at Waterloo Lines, Leuchars Station — paired with 32 Engineer Regiment
    - 75th Engineer Regiment, Royal Engineers (V), at Peninsula Barracks, Warrington — paired with 36 Engineer Regiment
    - 43 Headquarters and Support Squadron, at Chetwynd Barracks, Chilwell
    - 20 Works Group (Air Support), Royal Engineers, at RAF Wittering (Hybrid)
      - 510 Specialist Team (Airfields), Royal Engineers (V)
    - 62 Works Group, Royal Engineers, at Chetwynd Barracks, Chilwell
    - 63 Works Group, Royal Engineers, at Chetwynd Barracks, Chilwell
    - 65 Works Group, Royal Engineers (V), at Chetwynd Barracks, Chilwell
    - 66 Works Group, Royal Engineers, at Chetwynd Barracks, Chilwell
  - 29th (Explosive Ordnance Disposal and Search) Group, at Montgomery House, Aldershot Garrison
    - 660 Signal Troop (EOD), Royal Corps of Signals
    - 29 (Explosive Ordnance Disposal and Search) Group Support Unit, at Carver Barracks, Wimbish
    - 28 Engineer Regiment (Counter-Chemical, Biological, Radiological, and Nuclear), Royal Engineers, at Rock Barracks, Woodbridge (NRBC Defence)
      - Falcon Area Surveillance and Reconnaissance Squadron, Royal Tank Regiment, at Harman Lines, Warminster Garrison
    - 33 Engineer Regiment (Explosive Ordnance Disposal and Search), Royal Engineers, at Carver Barracks, Wimbish
    - 35 Engineer Regiment (Explosive Ordnance Disposal and Search), Royal Engineers, at Carver Barracks, Wimbish
    - 101 (City of London) Engineer Regiment (Explosive Ordnance Disposal and Search), Royal Engineers (V), at Hudson House, Catford — paired with 33 Engineer Regiment
    - 11 Explosive Ordnance Disposal and Search Regiment, Royal Logistic Corps, at Vauxhall Barracks, Didcot
    - 1 Military Working Dog Regiment, Royal Army Veterinary Corps, at Saint George's Barracks, North Luffenham (Hybrid)
      - 101 Military Working Dog Squadron (V), in Oakham
