= 12 (Force Support) Engineer Group =

Engineer formation of the British Army

12th (Force Support) Engineer Group 12th (Air Support) Engineer Brigade
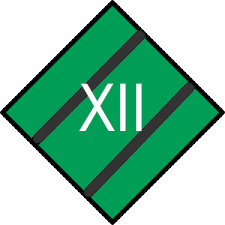
- Active: August 1974–present
- Country: United Kingdom
- Branch: British Army
- Type: Engineers
- Role: Force Support
- Size: Several regiments or independent squadrons
- Part of: 8th Engineer Brigade

12 (Force Support) Engineer Group is an engineer formation of the British Army.

== History ==
The group can trace its origins to 12th Engineer Brigade which was originally created to command the reserve Airfield Damage Repair regiments. In 1989 the brigade was under the command of the Eastern District, United Kingdom Land Forces and was headquartered at Waterbeach. By 1989, the brigade had a mix of regular and reserve units. and the brigade had the following structure:

- Headquarters - RAF Waterbeach
  - 39 Airfield Damage Repair Engineer Regiment, Royal Engineers
  - 529 (Air Support) Special Team, Royal Engineers -
  - Airfields Works Group, Royal Engineers
  - 50 Construction Field Squadron, Royal Engineers
  - 216 Airfield Damage Repair Squadron, Royal Engineers (Volunteers)
  - 217 Airfield Damage Repair Squadron, Royal Engineers (Volunteers)
  - 218 Airfield Damage Repair Squadron, Royal Engineers (Volunteers)
  - 219 Airfield Damage Repair Squadron, Royal Engineers (Volunteers)

After the Options for Change force reductions, the brigade was re-titled as the 12 (Air Support) Engineer Group, however it remained at RAF Waterbeach.

The 12th Engineer Group was formed after the conversion of the former 12th Engineer Brigade. In 2005, as a result of the Delivering Security in a Changing World White Paper, the group was moved under the command of the new 8th Force Engineer Brigade. Before the initial Army 2020 changes, the group had the following structure:

- Headquarters - RAF Waterbeach
  - 25 Air Support Engineer Regiment, Royal Engineers
  - 39 Air Support Engineer Regiment, Royal Engineers
  - 71 Engineer Regiment, Royal Engineers
  - 73 Engineer Regiment, Royal Engineers

== Structure ==
After the Army 2020 Refine reforms, the group was retitled as 12 (Force Support) Engineer Group remaining under the 8th Engineer Brigade. Its responsibilities changed from Airfield Support to "support to Theatre Entry, Route Maintenance, and Enabling Airfield Operations". The group's current structure is:

- 12th (Force Support) Engineer Group, at RAF Wittering, Cambridgeshire
  - 32 Engineer Regiment, Royal Engineers, at Marne Barracks, Catterick Garrison
  - 36 Engineer Regiment, Royal Engineers, at Invicta Park Barracks, Maidstone — regiment doubles as HQ Queen's Gurkha Engineers
  - 39 Engineer Regiment, Royal Engineers, at Kinloss Barracks, Kinloss
  - 71 Engineer Regiment, Royal Engineers, at Waterloo Lines, Leuchars Station — paired with 32 Engineer Regiment
  - 75 Engineer Regiment, Royal Engineers, at Peninsula Barracks, Warrington — paired with 36 Engineer Regiment
  - 43 Headquarters and Support Squadron, at Chetwynd Barracks, Chilwell (moving to Beacon Barracks, Stafford)
  - 20 Works Group (Air Support), Royal Engineers, at RAF Wittering (Hybrid)
    - 510 Specialist Team (Airfields), Royal Engineers
  - 62 Works Group, Royal Engineers, at Chetwynd Barracks, Chilwell (moving to Beacon Barracks, Stafford)
  - 63 Works Group, Royal Engineers, at Chetwynd Barracks, Chilwell (moving to Beacon Barracks, Stafford)
  - 65 Works Group, Royal Engineers, at Chetwynd Barracks, Chilwell (moving to Beacon Barracks, Stafford)
  - 66 Works Group, Royal Engineers, at Chetwynd Barracks, Chilwell (moving to Beacon Barracks, Stafford)

== Commanders ==
Commanding Officers of the group included:

- 2005–2008: Col. Andrew M. Mills
- 2008–2010: Col. Frank R. Noble
- 2010–2013: Col. Andrew W. Phillips
- 2013–2014: Col. Jason C. Rhodes
- 2014–2017: Col. Matthew Quare
- 2017–2020: Col. Thomas G.J. Marsden
- 2020–Present Col. Simon D. Millar
