= 170 (Infrastructure Support) Engineer Group =

Military Works Force 170 Infrastructure Engineer Group
- Active: 1978–2022
- Country: United Kingdom
- Branch: British Army
- Type: Engineers
- Nickname: 170 Infra Sp Engr Gp
- Website: 170 Infra Sp Engr Gp

170 (Infrastructure Support) Engineer Group was an engineering group of the British Army's Corps of Royal Engineers.

== History ==
=== Military Works Force ===
In 1978, following the 1975 Mason Review, the Military Works Force was formed at Chetwynd Barracks to control the Corps of Royal Engineers's works groups. It controlled the specialist engineering units and helped in commanding and providing those special services. The group was originally formed with the control of just two Commanders Royal Engineers (CREs) each with three Specialist Teams Royal Engineers (STREs), but this force was later expanded. At one time, the command controlled 530 STRE (Maintenance), but it is unknown when this STRE was formed, disbanded, and assigned to the group. The four CREs of the command included;

- Headquarters, Chetwynd Barracks
- 62 Chief Engineer (Works) [Water utilities, water development, and well drilling]
- 63 Chief Engineer (Works) [Electrical power generation and distribution, originally utilities and force protection]
- 64 Chief Engineer (Works) [Fuels, fuel production, and distribution]
- 65 Chief Engineer(Works) (V) [Civilian infrastructure, railway and ports infrastructure lines of communications]

=== 170 Engineer Group ===
In 2003, the 2003 Delivering Security in a Changing World reforms were announced. By 2005, engineer groups were regulated and renamed, one the changes being the Military Work Force being renamed as 170 (Infrastructure Support) Engineer Group and placed under the 8th Force Engineer Brigade. In addition to the changed of the group, the CRE units were re-titled as Works Groups. The name was also brought to represent the group as a military organisation rather than a civil organisation. Between 2005 and 2023, the group saw many units come and go, those who were included, but no longer;

- 67 Works Group (2011–2015) [Disbanded under Army 2020]
- Royal Monmouthshire Militia RE (2013—????) [Removed before 2015]
- Provisional Reconstruction Team (Operation Herrick)

During the sub-groups' time within the engineer group, many saw themselves take on a territorial, later reserve, specialist team. Following the initial Army 2020 reforms, each works group control a reserve specialist team regularly, as opposed to randomly for deployments. Following these initial reforms, the group was due to take control of the Royal Monmouthshire Militia, but this was reverted in 2015 when the refine announced they were to move under control of Headquarters Royal Engineers, 3rd (United Kingdom) Division.

In 2015, the Army 2020 Refine was published, as an "updated chapter" to the initial Army 2020 reform. Under this refine, the group HQ is to move to Gamecock Barracks, and is also due to have a decrease of 9 personnel.

=== Disbandment ===
170 (Infrastructure Support) Engineer Group disbanded in September 2022, with all the units resubordinating to 12 (Force Support Engineer) Group.

=== Structure on disbandment ===
At disbandment, the group had the following structure;

- Group Headquarters, Chetwynd Barracks (Moving to Gamecock Barracks)
  - 43 Headquarters and Support Squadron, Chetwynd Barracks (Moving to Gamecock Barracks)
- 20 Works Group (Air Support), RAF Wittering
  - 510 STRE (Note: STRE - Specialist Team, Royal Engineers) (Air Infrastructure) (Reserve)
  - 529 STRE (Air Support), RAF Wittering
  - 531 STRE (Airfields), RAF Waddington and RAF Coningsby
  - 532 STRE (Air Support), RAF Wittering
  - 534 STRE (Airfields), RAF Wattisham and RAF Marham
- 62 Works Group, Chetwynd Barracks (Providing water support) (Moving to Gamecock Barracks)
  - 519 STRE (Works)
  - 521 STRE (Water Development)
  - 522 STRE (Works)
  - 523 STRE (Works)
  - 524 STRE (Works)
  - 508 STRE (Works) (Reserve)
- 63 Works Group, Chetwynd Barracks (Providing power support) (Moving to Gamecock Barracks)
  - 518 STRE (Works)
  - 528 STRE (Power)
  - 504 STRE (Power Infrastructure) (V)
- 65 Works Group (Reserve), Chetwynd Barracks (Infrastructure support) (Moving to Gamecock Barracks)
  - 506 STRE (Water Infrastructure) (V)
  - 507 STRE (Railway Infrastructure) (V)
  - 508 STRE (Works) (V)
  - 509 STRE (Works Infrastructure) (V)
  - 525 STRE (Works) (V)
  - 526 STRE (Works) (V)
- 66 Works Group, Chetwynd Barracks (Air support) (Moving to Gamecock Barracks)
  - 517 STRE (Works)
  - 530 STRE (Materials)

== Commander ==
Commanders of the Engineer Group included:

- 2005-2008: Col. J. David McIlroy
- 2008-2011: Col. W.H. Smith
- 2011-2013: Col. Steven P.W. Boyd
- 2013-2015: Col. David J. Brambell
- 2015-2017: Col. James Crawford
- 2017-2020: Col. Peter T. Quaite
- 2020-2023: Col. Gavin P. Hatcher

== Sources ==
- Watson, Graham E.; Rinaldi, Richard A. (2018). The Corps of Royal Engineers: Organisation and Units 1889-2018. Tiger Lilly Books. ISBN 978-1717901804.
