= 10th Field Squadron (United Kingdom) =

10 Field Squadron 10 (Gulf) Field Squadron 10 Field Squadron (Air Support)
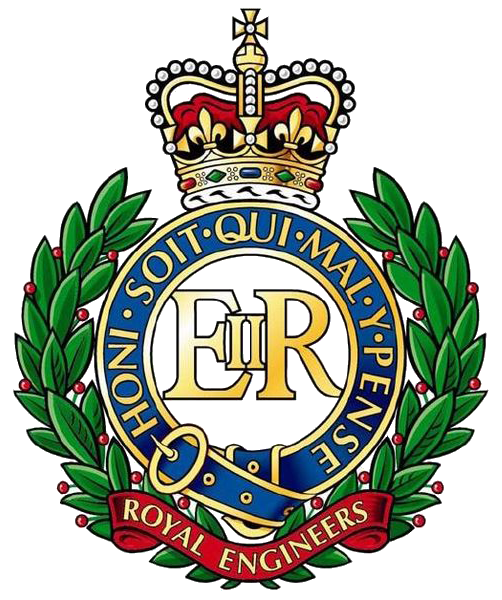
- Corps of Royal Engineers cap badge
- Active: 1939—1939; 1940—1964; 1964—1993; 2004—2013
- Country: United Kingdom
- Branch: British Army: Corps of Royal Engineers
- Role: Military Engineering
- Size: Squadron
- Part of: 39 Engineer Regiment (Air Support)
- Nickname: 10 Fld Sqn
- Engagements: Second World War: North African Campaign; Allied Invasion of Sicily; Italian Campaign; Operation Banner; Operation Telic
- Website: 39 Engineer Regiment Page

The 10th Railway Engineer Squadron, known operationally as 10 RW Squadron. The squadron was first formed during the pre-war expansion of the army in 1939 just before Second World War. The squadron was finally disbanded in 2013 following the initial Army 2020 reforms.

== History ==
=== Second World War ===
On 3 September 1939, the squadron was formed at GHQ, Longmoor Camp. Just a little after forming, the squadron was disbanded.

In May 1940, the squadron was reformed in the Middle East known as 10th Railway Construction and Operations Company (10 RW Cons and Op Coy). By July the squadron was based at RAF El Daba, supporting the RAF squadrons there. While based, the squadron was tasked with supporting the RAF squadrons through railway construction and support operations. Just a little after this, the squadron was moved to Sudan after being replaced by another company. By 1943, the squadron was renamed as 10th Railway Construction Company. In October 1943, following the Invasion of Sicily and eventual movement into mainland Italy, the company was assigned to the 1212th Railway Construction Group.

Following the end of the war, the company was based in Trieste and later Austria.

=== Post War ===
In 1947, the company moved to Egypt and assigned to the 10th Transport Regiment. Later, the squadron was assigned to Headquarters Railway Group in the Suez Canal Zone and then later the Middle-East Transport Regiment in 1954. By May 1955 the company moved to Longmoor and was assigned to the 16th Railway Training Regiment. In June of that year, the company was reduced to a cadre but by September was reformed and renamed as 10 Transportation Squadron. After reforming, the squadron joined the former regiment the 16th. Just a few weeks after, the squadron was reorganized as a Port for Far East Land Forces (FARLEF). After reorganizing, the squadron moved to Singapore seems to have become independent after this move. During this time, the squadron was administered by the 17th Port Transport Regiment. During this time, the squadron maintained an independent troop in Hong Kong. By 1960, the squadron was assigned to the Engineer Base Group, Singapore. In 1964 the squadron was disbanded and their role taken over by the Royal Logistic Corps.

In 1964 the squadron was disbanded and concurrently reformed that same year as 10 Field Squadron (Airfields). The squadron was formed at Invicta Park Barracks in Maidstone under 36 Engineer Regiment. Formed with the original intention of supporting the troops based in Aden it was No. 5004 RAF Airfield Construction Squadron (Airfield Construction Branch RAF) reformed under the Army control. In August the next year, the squadron moved to RAF Khormaksar and assigned directly to British Forces Aden.

In October that same year, the squadron moved location to RAF Sharjah in the United Arab Emirates. After moving, the squadron was renamed as 10 (Gulf) Field Squadron. By January 1969 the squadron moved back to Longmoore and assigned to the 37th Engineer Regiment. After moving back, the squadron was used as Hawker Siddeley Harrier air support squadron. In 1969 the Harrier had just been introduced, it was the newest and very first VTOL operational plane. It was found that after an examination, the Harrier worked much better in groups instead of individually. This created a need for a Harrier Support Group, this formation was the result of the 1966 Defence White Paper. From February to April 1971 the squadron deployed, less one troop deployed to Gibraltar on an emergency tour. And in April, still without that troop, deployed to Honduras. The troop that had been left behind, "A Troop" deployed to Northern Ireland as part of Operation Banner from October 70—January 71.

By January 1973 the squadron moved to RAF Laarbruch in Western Germany. After moving, the squadron was assigned as one of the RAF Support units. By 1982 the squadron moved to Mansergh Barracks in Gutersloh under 38th Engineer Regiment. Finally, in December 1992 the squadron became "non-operational" and was disbanded in July 1993.

=== 21st Century ===
On 26 February 2004 following the "Delivering Security in a Changing World" reforms of 2003, the squadron was reformed as 10 Field Squadron (Air Support). The squadron was based at RAF Leeming and assigned to 39 Engineer Regiment (Air Assault). The squadron later deployed on Operation Telic II from June—November 2003. The squadron was disbanded on 22 May 2013 following the initial Army 2020 reforms.

== Sources ==
- Watson Graham E and Rinaldi Richard A. The Corps of Royal Engineers: Organisation and Units 1889–2018. Tiger Lilly Books ISBN 9781717901804
- 10 Squadron, Squadrons, Royal Engineers - at british-army-units1945on.co.uk http://british-army-units1945on.co.uk/royal-engineers/squadrons/10-squadron.html
