= 73 Engineer Regiment (United Kingdom) =

- Active: 1969 - 2014
- Country: United Kingdom
- Branch: Army
- Type: Engineers
- Size: Regiment
- Part of: I Corps; 29th Engineer Brigade; 12th Engineer Brigade
- Garrison/HQ: Nottingham

73 Engineer Regiment was a Territorial regiment of the Royal Engineers, part of the British Army active from 1969 to 2014.

== History ==
73 Engineer Regiment was formed when the Territorial Army was drastically reduced in the late 1960s asa reinforcement combat engineer unit to support I (BR) Corps in Germany.

During 1969 - 1991, the regiment was assigned to 29 Engineer Brigade. It sponsored the Robin Hood Battalion cadre during 1969-71. In 1991, the regiment was re-organized to become 73 Air Support Engineer Regiment. In 1997, the regiment was assigned to 12 (Air Support) Engineer Brigade. Parts of the regiment served in Operation Telic I and Operation Telic III. In 2006, the regiment was re-organized to become 73 Engineer Regiment. In 2014, 350 Squadron was transferred to 33 Explosive Ordnance Disposal Engineer Regiment; the rest of the regiment was disbanded.

== Structure ==
The regiment's structure changed over its history; the structure just before disbandment was:

Locations:
Squadron Location
- Headquarters Troop
- 575 (Sherwood Foresters) Field Squadron
- 129 (East Riding) Field Squadron
- 350 (Nottinghamshire) Field Squadron

Other squadrons that served with the regiment were:

- 129 Headquarters and Support Squadron
- 217 (London) Field Squadron
- 272 (West Riding Artillery) Field Squadron
- 873 Movement Light Squadron
- 106 (West Riding) Field Squadron
- The Jersey Field Squadron, Royal Engineers
