= RAF Kinloss =

Former Royal Air Force station in Moray, Scotland

RAF Kinloss
- Kinloss, Moray in Scotland
- Nimrod aircraft parked at RAF Kinloss.

- Power to the Hunter

Site information
- Type: Royal Air Force station
- Owner: Ministry of Defence
- Operator: Royal Air Force
- Controlled by: RAF Strike Command * No. 18 Group RAF; RAF Air Command * No. 1 Group RAF
- Condition: Closed

Location
- Location in Moray
- Coordinates: 57°38′58″N 003°33′38″W
- Grid reference: NH070630
- Area: 666 hectares

Site history
- Built: 1938
- In use: 1939–2012
- Fate: Transferred to British Army to become Kinloss Barracks.; Airfield maintained as a Relief Landing Ground.

Garrison information
- Past commanders: Group Captain James Johnston (final station commander)

Airfield information
- Identifiers: IATA: FSS, ICAO: EGQK, WMO: 03066
- Elevation: 6.7 metres (22 ft) AMSL
Runways
Direction	Length and surface
07/25	2,375 metres (7,792 ft) Asphalt

Royal Air Force Kinloss, or more simply RAF Kinloss, is a former Royal Air Force station located near the village of Kinloss, on the Moray Firth in the north east of Scotland, UK.

The RAF station opened on 1 April 1939 and served as a training establishment during the Second World War. After the war it was handed over to Coastal Command to monitor Soviet ships and submarines in the Norwegian Sea. Until 2010 it was the main base for the RAF's fleet of Hawker Siddeley Nimrod MR.2 maritime patrol aircraft. It was intended that the MR2 would be replaced by the Nimrod MRA.4, but the MRA4 was cancelled in the Strategic Defence and Security Review of October 2010. As a result, Kinloss became surplus to RAF requirements and regular flying operations ceased on 31 July 2011.

In November 2011, the Ministry of Defence and 12 (Air Support) Engineer Group of the British Army announced that 930 personnel from 39 Engineer Regiment (Air Support) would move from Waterbeach Barracks, near Cambridge, to Kinloss in summer 2012. The first personnel of 39 Engineer Regiment arrived in June 2012, with the majority arriving in July 2012.

On 26 July 2012 the RAF Ensign was lowered for the last time, and replaced by the flag of 39 Engineer Regiment, marking the establishment of Kinloss Barracks.

== History ==
=== Construction ===
The area around Kinloss was surveyed in 1937 for the purposes of identifying land to establish a new flying training school for the Royal Air Force. In January 1938, 151.9 ha (375 acres) of agricultural land within the Barony of Muirton was compulsorily purchased at Kinloss Home Farm, Easter Langcot, Wester Langcot, Doon Park and Muirton. Contractor Mowlem began work in March 1938, with several farm buildings being demolished and land cleared. By August 1938, construction of three C-type hangars, support buildings and airmen's wooden hut accommodation was under-way, along with the laying out of three grass surfaced runways, each 3,301 ft (1,006 m) long.

RAF Kinloss opened on 1 April 1939 as part of No. 21 Group, with Group Captain Arthur Peck being the first commander of the station. Initially, many personnel who were posted to Kinloss were previously unaware of the station and were surprised at how far north it was located. The northerly latitude of the station later earned it the nickname within the RAF of "Ice Station Kilo", after the 1968 espionage film Ice Station Zebra.

No. 14 Flying Training School (FTS) was soon established from No. 8 FTS personnel based at RAF Montrose. It was initially equipped with thirty-eight Airspeed Oxfords and twenty-six Hawker Harts and Audaxes. The first aircraft, an Oxford with serial N4584, arrived on 9 May 1939, with the first student aircrews arriving on 13 May. In August 1939 North American Harvards replaced the Harts. October 1939 saw the addition of ten Avro Ansons and six Harts from the recently disbanded No. 13 FTS which was based at RAF Drem in East Lothian.

=== Second World War ===
In late 1939, the station hosted detachments of Armstrong Whitworth Whitleys of No. 10, No. 51, No. 77 and No. 102 Squadron. The aircraft were taking part in operations against German U-boats operating in the north Atlantic. In December that year, Supermarine Spitfires of No. 609 Squadron were temporarily based at Kinloss whilst tasked with defending vessels of the Home Fleet moored in Loch Ewe.

No. 45 Maintenance Unit was established on 15 April 1940, the role of which was to store, modify and fit-out new aircraft before they were forwarded to front-line squadrons. The unit's first aircraft, a Harvard, arrived on 31 May 1940. A large number of aircraft types were stored at Kinloss during 1940 including, Hawker Audax, Hawker Hind, Hawker Hart, De Havilland Tiger Moth, Handley Page Harrow, Miles Magister, Airspeed Envoy, Bristol Blenheim, Airspeed Oxford, Hawker Hector, Avro Tutor, Westland Wallace and later Whitley, Spitfire Vickers Wellington and Handley Page Halifax. By October 1940 the unit had approximately 440 personnel.

The German invasion of Denmark and Norway in April 1940 led to an increase in operational activity at Kinloss and other Scottish airfields. As a result, No. 14 FTS moved south to RAF Cranfield in Bedfordshire on 20 April 1940. A detachment of No. 77 and No. 109 Squadron Whitleys from RAF Driffield returned the same month to undertake bombing missions in Norway, departing Kinloss in May.

Kinloss was transferred to No. 4 Group on 27 May 1940, at the time part of RAF Bomber Command. At the same time No. 19 Operational Training unit (No. 19 OTU) was formed and tasked with training aircrews on heavy-bomber aircraft before deployment onto operational squadrons. The unit was initially equipped with forty-eight Whitleys and sixteen Avro Ansons and the first training courses began in June 1940. By 1941 Kinloss was overcrowded with aircraft belonging to No. 45 MU and No. 19 OTU, therefore a satellite station was constructed at Balnageith, to the south west of the nearby town of Forres. The satellite, known as RAF Forres, opened on 25 January 1941, with 'D' flight of No. 19 OTU and their Whitleys moving in on 27 April 1941 and 'C' flight following on 13 May 1941. Despite this, Kinloss continued to struggle to accommodate all No. 45 MU's aircraft. To relieve pressure on space, two satellite landing grounds (SLG) were established to store aircraft off-site in August 1941. These were at RAF Dornoch (No. 40 SLG) near Dornoch and RAF Kirkton (No. 41 SLG) near Golspie, located 23 and 27 miles away across the Moray Firth respectively.

During the summer of 1942, Kinloss's grass runways were replaced with permanent paved runways, with the main runway extended to 1,828m (now runway 07/25) and two secondary runways constructed. This allowed a wide range of aircraft types to use Kinloss as a diversion airfield when their home stations further south were closed due to poor weather. By the end of 1943, around 350 aircraft were stored by No. 45 MU. Throughout the war a high number of aircraft from Kinloss crashed resulting in the loss of aircrews and it was not unusual to see the wreckage of aircraft in the countryside around the station. This was predominately because of the older aircraft that were used for training by No. 19 OTU, poor weather and inexperienced crews.

Towards the end of 1944, the requirement for trained bomber crews reduced, resulting in RAF Forres closing in October of that year. In November, No. 19 OTU's Whitleys were replaced with forty Wellington bombers. VE Day on 8 May 1945 marked the end of the war in Europe and shortly after on 20 May, No. 19 OTU was disbanded, with its aircraft being sent to various maintenance units around the UK. The runway was resurfaced in June 1945, whilst No. 45 MU prepared aircraft for the continuing war in the Far East. The unit was also soon deluged with surplus aircraft for sale or scrap.

=== Cold War ===
In October 1945 No. 6 Coastal OTU arrived and saw the beginning of Kinloss's association with anti-submarine and maritime patrol operations, an association that continued until the station's closure. The wartime Avro Lancaster was adapted for anti-submarine and search and rescue duties and RAF Kinloss changed from a bomber training unit, to a Coastal Command base training maritime aircrew. Its personnel now also included National Servicemen.

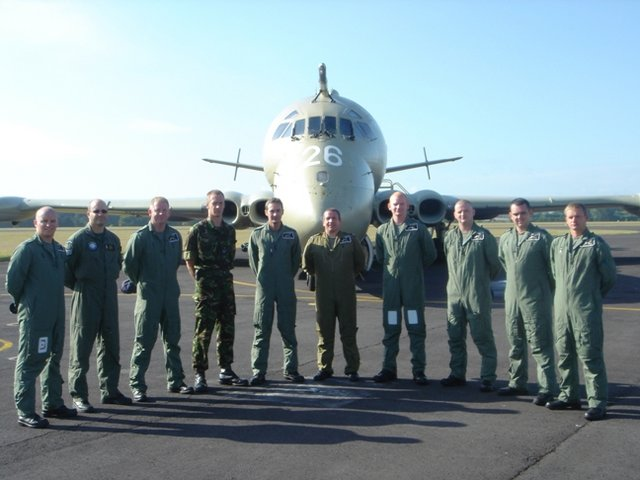
Nimrod Aircrew at Kinloss

No. 19 (C)OTU was split into No. 236 Operational Conversion Unit and the School of Maritime Reconnaissance in 1947 with No. 236 OCU remaining at Kinloss. A further change in 1956 saw the units re-combine as the Maritime Operational Training Unit (MOTU), which remained at Kinloss until 1965.

During the Cold War, Kinloss squadrons carried out anti-submarine duties, locating and shadowing Soviet naval units. In 1951, No. 217 Squadron was resurrected with Lockheed Neptune MR.1 aircraft to cover the maritime reconnaissance and search and rescue roles pending the further development of the Avro Shackleton aircraft. It was also prominent in Operation Snowdrop, supplying food to cut off villages and livestock fodder to isolated crofts in Scotland, during the winter of 1954 and 1955. The squadron was upgraded with MR.2 versions of the Neptune in 1956, only to be disbanded again in July 1956.

In July 1962, the station received one of its highest honours, the Civic Freedom of the Royal and Ancient Burgh of Forres, allowing Kinloss personnel the right to march through the burgh with swords drawn. This was the first time any military unit had been so honoured by Forres throughout the burgh's 1,400-year history.

In 1972 and 1976, the new Hawker Siddeley Nimrod MR.1 demonstrated its capabilities when it flew surveillance sorties over Iceland's disputed fishing limits, providing support for the Royal Navy and British trawlers in the Cod Wars. For much of the period No.120 Squadron, No. 201 Squadron, and No. 206 Squadron were the main Nimrod units.

In November 1980 two pilots, Royal Australian Air Force Flight Lieutenant Noel Anthony and RAF Flying Officer Stephen Belcher were killed when their Nimrod aircraft struck birds on take-off and crashed in woods to the east of Kinloss airfield. The remainder of the crew survived. Anthony was awarded the Air Force Cross and Belcher the Queen's Commendation for Valuable Service in the Air.

After the Argentines invaded the Falkland Islands in 1982, Nimrod MR2's adapted for air-to-air refuelling, were deployed to Ascension Island in the South Atlantic to support the Falklands War effort.

=== Post-Cold War ===
Nimrod MR2 aircraft at RAF Kinloss in 1999

In 1991, Nimrods deployed to the Persian Gulf as an integral component of the coalition forces to recapture Kuwait during the Gulf War. Furthermore, Nimrods were deployed to the Adriatic as part of the United Nations peace-keeping force in the 1990s Yugoslav Wars. More recently in 2003, the Nimrod played a pivotal role in Operation Telic. The station's high level of involvement in operational activities led to RAF Kinloss being awarded the coveted Stainforth Trophy for the best operational performance in 2004.

In April 2005, No. 206 Squadron was disbanded as part of a defence review the previous year. The base was used for the 2005 Edinburgh and South Scotland Wing Air Cadet Annual Summer Camp.

On 2 September 2006, twelve Nimrod crew members from No. 120 Squadron's crew 3 and two observers were killed when their Nimrod, serial number XV230, exploded over Afghanistan.

No. 325 Expeditionary Air Wing (EAW) was formed at the station on 1 April 2006. The wing encompassed most of the non-formed unit personnel on station. The EAW did not include the flying units at the station.

== Closure of RAF Station ==
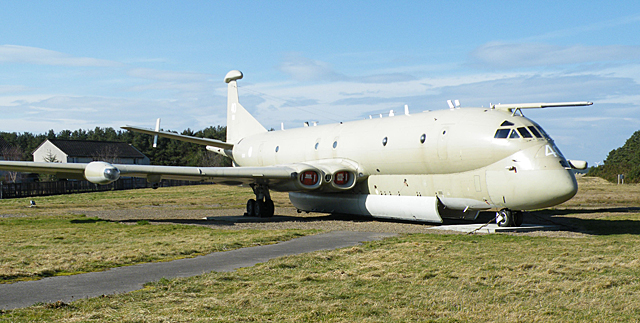
A retired Nimrod MR2 aircraft close to the perimeter fence in March 2011

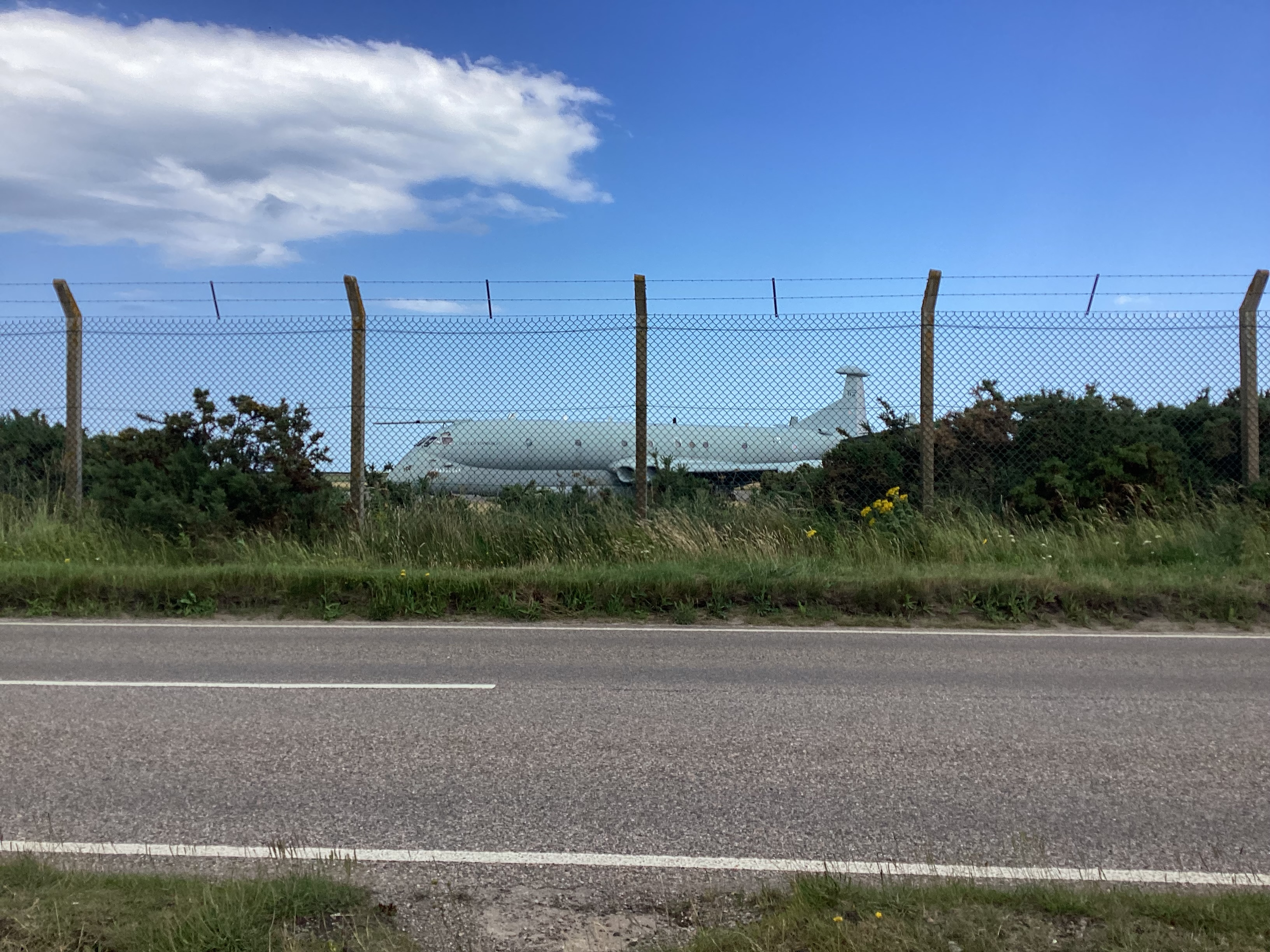
XV244 Nimrod Aircraft behind the fence.

In December 2009, the Ministry of Defence (MOD) announced the retirement of the Nimrod MR2 by March 2010, twelve months earlier than originally planned. It was also announced that the in-service date of its replacement, the BAE Systems Nimrod MRA4, would be delayed until Autumn 2012, with the aircraft expected to start arriving at Kinloss in February 2010. This was delayed again in June 2010 when it was announced that the MRA4 would arrive at the end of 2010.

With Nimrod MR2 operations having ended in March 2010, the Strategic Defence and Security Review in October 2010 revealed that the Nimrod MRA4 programme would in-fact be cancelled and that RAF Kinloss would close. Station commander Group Captain James Johnston said there had been disbelief when the announcement was made. As a result, No. 120, No. 201 and No. 42(R) Squadron (the Operational Conversion Unit) were disbanded on 26 May 2011 at a ceremony attended by the station's Honorary Air Commodore, Prince Philip, Duke of Edinburgh. The RAF station ceased to be operational on 31 July 2011.

== Post RAF use ==
=== Establishment of Army barracks ===
On 18 July 2011, the MOD announced that Kinloss would become a British Army barracks, with army units arriving in 2014 or 2015. A further announcement in November 2011 confirmed that 39 Engineer Regiment (Air Support) of the Royal Engineers would move from Waterbeach Barracks, near Cambridge, to Kinloss Barracks in July 2012. It was expected that 930 service personnel and their families would move at this time. The number of army personnel based at Kinloss would be 41% down on the number of personnel which were present during the RAF's tenure.

After 73 years as an RAF station, control of Kinloss transferred to the British Army at 12:00 on 26 July 2012. A ceremony was attended by eight former RAF Kinloss station commanders, the last station commander Group Captain James Johnston, the Lord Lieutenant of Moray and invited guests. The RAF colours were lowered for the last time and British Army colours raised to mark the new chapter in Kinloss's history.

=== Flying activities ===
The airfield at Kinloss is maintained by the RAF as a relief landing ground for aircraft based at nearby RAF Lossiemouth and continues to be used by Moray Flying Club. It cannot be booked by other aircraft as a diversion airfield or for refuelling stops. Until its disbandment in 2017, the RAF's No. 663 Volunteer Gliding Squadron, operating the Grob Vigilant T1, also operated from the airfield.

During 2020, regular flying temporarily returned to Kinloss when the first of the RAF's Poseidon MRA1 fleet arrived in the UK from the United States in February 2020, initially operating from the barracks whilst work was carried out at RAF Lossiemouth to accommodate the new aircraft. Lossiemouth's airfield was closed between 10 August and 16 October 2020 whilst the intersection of its two runways was resurfaced. During the closure, routine Typhoon FGR4 training operations were relocated to Kinloss. A second Poseidon arrived before they and the Typhoons departed for Lossiemouth on the re-opening of the Lossiemouth in October 2020.

== Unit profiles ==
=== Aeronautical Rescue Coordination Centre ===
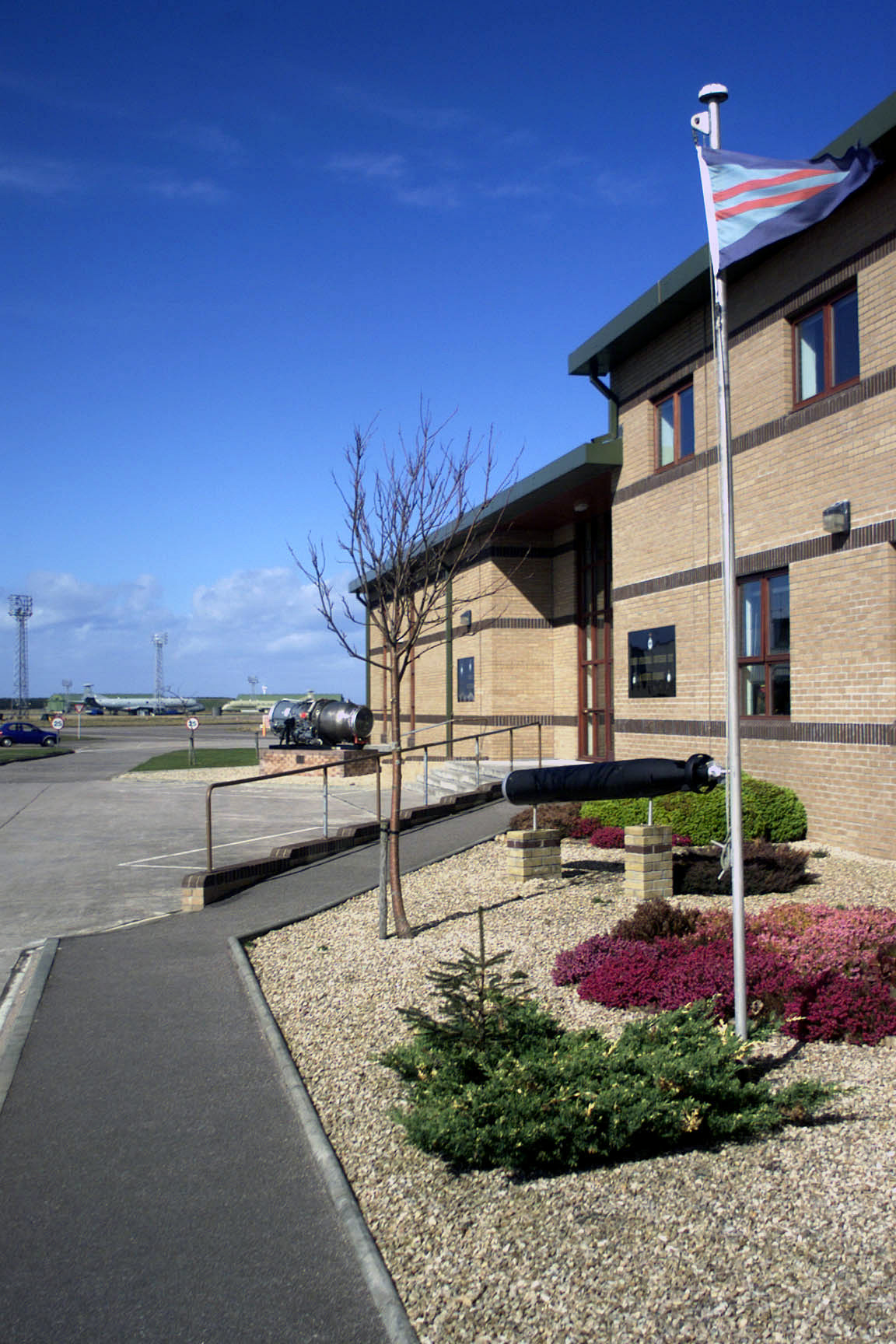
The Aeronautical Rescue Coordination Centre building in 2001

RAF Kinloss became home to the UK Aeronautical Rescue Coordination Centre (ARCC) in 1997 when the ARCC's located in Edinburgh and Plymouth were combined into one centre covering the whole UK Search and Rescue Region. The ARCC was responsible for tasking all UK search and rescue (SAR) assets such as RAF, Royal Navy and coastguard helicopters, fixed wing aircraft and mountain rescue teams. It coordinated a wide range of activities associated with SAR operations, including overland search planning, refuelling arrangements, airspace considerations, multi-agency communications, and co-ordination with other emergency services. The ARCC included the UK Mission Control Centre (UKMCC) which is the facility responsible for the detection and notification of emergency distress beacon alerts through the International Cospas-Sarsat Programme, which is able to detect beacon activations worldwide through a network of satellites.

Despite the transfer of Kinloss from the RAF to the British Army in 2012, the ARCC remained at the station. However, in December 2014 the Ministry of Defence announced that the ARCC at Kinloss would close and be relocated to the Maritime and Coastguard Agency's National Maritime Operations Centre located in Fareham, Hampshire. The Kinloss ARCC closed on 31 March 2016, with twenty-seven RAF personnel being redeployed to other RAF stations, or leaving the service, and ten civilian jobs being lost from Kinloss.

=== Mountain Rescue Team ===
The RAF Kinloss Mountain Rescue Team (MRT) was established in July 1944 as part of the RAF Mountain Rescue Service. Prior to that, mountain rescue had been carried out by a voluntary team. With the closure of Kinloss as an RAF base in July 2012, the RAF Kinloss Mountain Rescue Team was renamed the RAF Lossiemouth MRT. The team continued to operate from their existing purpose built base at Kinloss for over two years, until they moved into the former 'D' Flight No. 202 Squadron hangar at Lossiemouth in February 2015.

=== Nimrod Major Servicing Unit ===
Hangars once used by The Nimrod Major Servicing Unit

The Nimrod Major Servicing Unit (NMSU) was established on 1 March 1971 to provide dedicated maintenance to the Hawker Siddeley Nimrod fleet. The unit provided servicing for both the maritime reconnaissance (MR1 and MR2) and reconnaissance (R1) variants of the Nimrod, from three hangars (No. 11, 12 and 13) on the north side of the airfield. The NMSU was manned by RAF personnel until June 1995 when the function was privatised. A joint venture of Flight Refuelling Aviation (FRA) and Serco took on the role, with the contract being renewed in 1998 when FRA became the primary contractor. BAE Systems took over the contract in 2000. FRA still provided maintenance services and the organisation becoming known as the Nimrod Support Group (NSG). The NSG continued operating until the Nimrod's withdrawal from service in March 2010.

== Previous units and aircraft ==
List of flying units and major non-flying units permanently based at Kinloss.

Source: Unless otherwise indicated details sourced are from: Hughes, Jim. (1995), Power to the Hunter. A History of Royal Air Force Kinloss, British Aerospace. pp. 95–97.

Service	Unit	Aircraft / role	From	Date from	Date to	To
RAF	No. 14 Flying Training School	Airspeed Oxford; Hawker Hart; Hawker Audax; North American Harvard Mk I; Avro Anson Mk I	Formed	1 April 1939	20 April 1940	RAF Cranfield
RAF	No. 45 Maintenance Unit	Various	Formed	6 April 1940	15 January 1957	Disbanded
RAF	No. 19 Operational Training Unit	Armstrong Whitworth Whitley; Avro Anson Mk I; Westland Lysander, Boulton Paul Defiant Mk III; Miles Martinet Mk I; Curtiss Tomahawk; Airspeed Oxford; Hawker Hurricane Mk II; Vickers Wellington Mk X; Miles Master	Formed	27 May 1940	26 May 1945	Disbanded
RAF	RAF Kinloss Mountain Rescue Team	Mountain rescue	Formed from voluntary team	cJuly 1944	July 2012	Became the RAF Lossiemouth MRT (remained at Kinloss until February 2015)
RAF	No. 6 (Coastal) Operational Training Unit	Vickers Wellington Mk X and Mk XIV; Vickers Warick Mk I and Mk II; de Havilland Mosquito Mk FB VI and Mk T III; Bristol Buckmaster Mk I; Bristol Beaufighter Mk X; Avro Lancaster Mk GR.3	RAF Silloth	19 July 1945	31 July 1946	Reformed as No. 236 OCU.
RAF	No. 236 Operational Conversion Unit (OCU)	Bristol Beaufighter Mk X; Bristol Buckmaster Mk I; Avro Lancaster GR.3; Avro Shackleton MR.1; Avro Anson Mk XI; Lockheed Neptune MR.1	Formed	1 August 1947	30 September 1956	Reformed as the MOTU.
RAF	No. 1453 (Vanguard) Flight	Lockheed Neptune MR.1	Formed	1 November 1952	5 June 1953	Disbanded
RAF	Maritime Operational Training Unit (MOTU)	Avro Shackleton MR.1 and T.4	Former No. 236 OCU	1 October 1956	2 July 1965	RAF St. Mawgan
RAF	No. 120 Squadron	Avro Shackleton MR.3; Hawker Siddeley Nimrod MR.1; Hawker Siddeley Nimrod MR2	RAF Aldergrove	1 April 1959	26 May 2011	Disbanded
RAF	No. 201 Squadron	Avro Shackleton MR.3; Hawker Siddeley Nimrod MR.1; Hawker Siddeley Nimrod MR2	RAF St. Mawgan	14 March 1965	26 May 2011	Disbanded
RAF	No. 206 Squadron	Avro Shackleton MR.3; Hawker Siddeley Nimrod MR.1; Hawker Siddeley Nimrod MR2	RAF St. Mawgan	7 July 1965	1 April 2005	Disbanded
RAF	Nimrod Major Servicing Unit (NMSU)	Nimrod heavy maintenance	Formed	March 1970	1995	Privatised.
RAF	No. 8 Squadron	Avro Shackleton MR.2; Avro Shackleton AEW.2	Reformed	January 1972	17 August 1973	RAF Lossiemouth
RAF	No. 236 Operational Conversion Unit	Hawker Siddeley Nimrod MR2	Reformed	April 1982	October 1983	RAF St. Mawgan
RAF	No. 42 (Reserve) Squadron	Hawker Siddeley Nimrod MR2	RAF St. Mawgan	July 1992	26 May 2011	Disbanded
RAF	Aeronautical Rescue Coordination Centre (ARCC)	Rescue Coordination	Edinburgh ARCC and Plymouth ARCC	1997	31 March 2016	National Maritime Operations Centre, Fareham.

== Suspected postwar radioactive contamination ==
After the Second World War, Kinloss was used to break-up surplus RAF aircraft and recover what was recyclable. Kinloss was chosen due to its remote location, and hence easy access to potential landfill sites which would be largely undisturbed by the public. The aircraft broken up included various components which had carried chemical weapons (including sulphur mustard), and were painted with fluorescent paint containing radium to allow the planes to be more easily operated at night. On removal, these contaminated items were buried in landfill sites either on the base or close to it.

In 2004, with the development of a new water pipeline, a land quality assessment warned that sulphur mustard may be present within landfill and waste areas accessible to the public. The report stated that RAF believed there was a potential for chemical weapons agents and radiological contamination to be present in the ground:

Any personnel involved in the ground investigation have the potential to be at risk from these contaminants. There are a number of anomalies present on the investigation area that have not been investigated, and in some areas it was not possible to conduct the geophysical survey due to heavy gorse cover

However, no trace of chemical weapons agents was found during the land quality assessment, although material contaminated with radium was removed from land near the base in 2004.

After the 2004 documents became public in May 2012, it emerged that the Scottish Environment Protection Agency (SEPA) was investigating radioactive contamination at the site linked to the use of "glow in the dark paint" in Second World War aircraft.

== See also ==
- List of former Royal Air Force stations

== Bibliography ==
- Birtles, Philip (2012). UK Airfields of the Cold War. Midland Publishing. ISBN 978-1-85780-346-4.
- Hughes, Jim (1995). Power to the Hunter. A History of Royal Air Force Kinloss British Aerospace
