= Gibraltar Barracks, Minley =

Military barracks in Hampshire, England

Gibraltar Barracks
- Minley
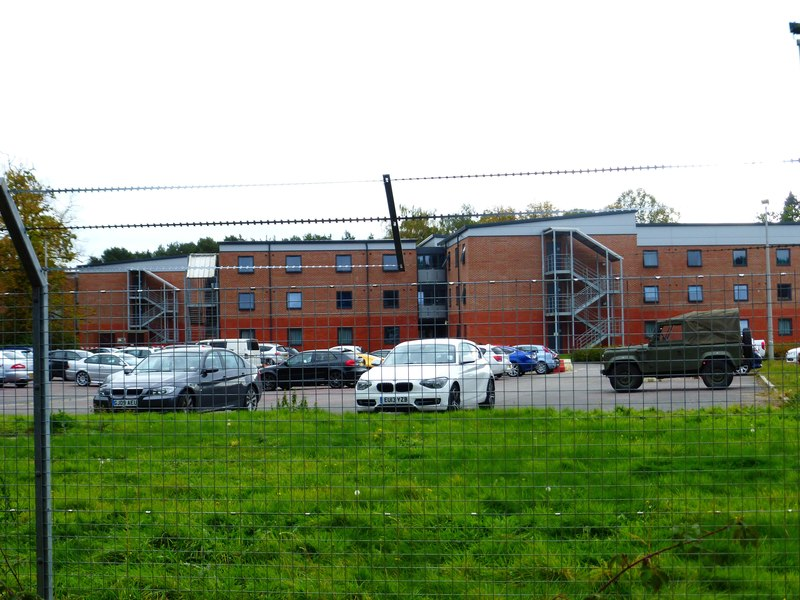
- Gibraltar Barracks

Site information
- Type: Barracks
- Owner: Ministry of Defence
- Operator: British Army

Location
- Location within Hampshire
- Coordinates: 51.31799°N 0.81946°W

Site history
- Built: 1976
- In use: 1976–present

Garrison information
- Occupants: Headquarters, 8th Engineer Brigade; Headquarters, Royal Corps of Army Music

Gibraltar Barracks is a British Army installation at Minley in Hampshire.

== History ==
The Royal Engineers first arrived at Minley with an engineer brigade in the early 1970s. The corps occupied Minley Manor and initially used it as their brigade headquarters. The Queen visited the site to initiate works on modern military facilities on the opposite side of the A327 Minley Road in October 1976. The new facilities were officially opened as Gibraltar Barracks by General Sir William Jackson in September 1979, the manor going on to serve as its officers' mess.

Between 2008 and 2013, as part of the RSME-PPP project, the Holdfast consortium redeveloped the barracks and built a new officers' mess on the site so allowing the manor to be sold.

Headquarters, 8th Engineer Brigade moved to Gibraltar Barracks in 2014.

In 2021, the corps headquarters of the Royal Corps of Army Music moved from Kneller Hall in Twickenham to Gibraltar Barracks.

== Current units ==
The units currently based at the barracks are:

- Headquarters, Royal Corps of Army Music (since August 2021)
- Headquarters, 8th Engineer Brigade
- Royal School of Military Engineering Group (Headquarters in Chatham, Kent)
  - 3 Royal School of Military Engineering (3 RSME) Regiment
    - Combat Engineer School
- Mine Information and Training Centre
- Royal Engineers Trials and Development Unit
- Royal Engineers Warfare Wing
