= 36 Engineer Regiment (United Kingdom) =

36th Engineer Regiment
- Unique badge of the Queen's Gurkha Engineers
- Active: 1948—Present
- Country: United Kingdom
- Branch: British Army: Corps of Royal Engineers
- Role: Military Engineering
- Size: Regiment; 764 personnel
- Part of: 12 (Force Support) Engineer Group
- Website: 36 Engineer Regiment

The 36 Engineer Regiment is a regiment of the Corps of Royal Engineers within the British Army. The regiment trace their history back to before World War II as 36 Army Engineer Regiment. The regiment today is a general support engineer regiment provided force support within 12 (Force Support) Engineer Group.

== History ==
36 Engineer Regiment's predecessor was 36 Army Engineer Regiment which saw service in World War II. There is not much information written about this unit but it is known it was based in Germany when the war ended. In 1949, the regiment moved to Invicta Park Barracks in Maidstone, Kent. In 1951, the regiment moved to Ripon and had the following structure:

- Regimental Headquarters
- 24, 57, and 58 Field Squadrons
- 20 Field Park Squadron

In 1955, the regiment moved to Osnabrück where it joined the 11th Engineer Group. Following their move, the regiment was renamed as the 36 Corps Engineer Regiment as the group, 11 Engineer Group, was tasked with supporting the 1st Corps. In 1956, the regiment saw a deployment to the Middle East with the 2nd (British) Corps during the Suez Invasion. Upon returning from the Middle East the regiment moved back to Invicta Park Barracks in Maidstone. For one year, December 1958 – December 1959 the regiment deployed to Christmas Island after Operation Grapple.

In January 1969, the regiment was renamed as 36 Engineer Regiment and by 1974 deployed to Northern Ireland as part of the rebuilding process after the start of Operation Banner. In the 1982 Falklands Conflict the regiment sent a detachment assigned to the 5th Infantry Brigade.

By 1992, the major Options for Change reforms hit the armed forces. As a result of these major reforms the 11th Engineer Group was disbanded and the regiment joined the 1st (UK) Armoured Division directly as a close support regiment for the 20th Armoured Brigade. In 1994 the regiment deployed on Operation Grapple 4. In 1995 the regiment took part in the camp building for the new 24th Airmobile Brigade. In 1999 the regiment joined the 5th Airborne Brigade and by 2002 supported the 16th Air Assault Infantry Brigade.

By the time that the Delivering Security in a Changing World reforms were announced, the regiment was based at Invicta Park Barracks in Maidstone, Kent. By this time the regiment still had the same role but had the following structure:

- Regimental Headquarters
- 9 Parachute Squadron, moved to 23 Engineer Regiment after reform
- 20 Field Squadron
- 69 Gurkha Field Squadron
- 61 Field Support Squadron, moved to 23 Engineer Regiment after reform
- 70 Field Support Squadron, joined in 2000

From October 2007 to April 2008 the regiment deployed to Afghanistan on Operation Herrick VII, during which it was assigned to the 52nd Infantry Brigade.

In 2010, the original Army 2020 reforms started and the regiment was re-titled as the 36 Search Engineer Regiment. In 2015, when the Army 2020 Refines were announced the regiment dropped the "search" title and was assigned to the 12 (Force Support) Engineer Group. As part of these reforms, it was announced that the rest of the units based in Germany were to be moved back to England. As a result the regiment moved to Invicta Park Barracks in Maidstone. The regiment is scheduled to move again by 2027, but it has not yet been confirmed exactly where.

The regiment now has the following structure:

- Regimental Headquarters
- 50 Headquarters and Support Squadron
- 20 Field Squadron
- 69 Gurkha Field Squadron
- 61 Field Support Squadron

In addition to these reforms, the regiment will be designated as a force structure unit and is to be paired with the 75th Volunteer Engineer Regiment.

== Future ==
According to an answer by the then Minister of State for the Armed Forces, Major General Mark Lancaster, the 67 Gurkha Squadron is to be formed by 2021 and the 68 Gurkha Squadron by 2023.

== Deployments ==
- Suez Invasion, Egypt (Invasion Support)
- Operation Grapple, Christmas Island (Nuclear Bombs Experiments Support)
- Operation Banner, Northern Ireland (Anti-Terrorist Engineering and Support)
- Operation Agricola, Kosovo (NATO Deployment)
- Operation Telic, Iraq (NATO Deployment)
- Operation Herrick, Afghanistan (NATO Deployment)
- Operation Trenton, South Sudan (United Nations Peace Keeping)
- Operation Tosca, Republic of Cyprus (United Nations Peace Keeping)
- Operation Marmat, Federal Democratic Republic of Nepal (Earthquake Disaster Relief)
- Project Animoi, Falkland Islands (Infrastructure Upgrade and Support)

== Sources ==
- "British Army units from 1945 on - 36 Regiment". british-army-units1945on.co.uk. Retrieved 2019-08-21.
- 36 Engineer Regiment
