= 35 Engineer Regiment (EOD&S) =

- Insignia of 35 Engineer Regiment (EOD&S); Hector, Prince of Troy
- Active: 1948 – present
- Country: United Kingdom
- Branch: British Army
- Type: Engineering
- Role: Close Support
- Size: Three squadrons 518 personnel
- Part of: 8th Engineer Brigade
- Garrison/HQ: Carver Barracks, Wimbish

35 Engineer Regiment (EOD&S), Royal Engineers is an Explosive Ordnance Disposal and Search unit of the British Army, part of 8th Engineer Brigade.

== History ==
The regiment was formed from 29th Army Troops, Royal Engineers at Crowborough, England, in April 1948. It then departed for Libya and Middle East Land Forces.

The regiment arrived in Germany in 1957 after being at Ripon 1955-57 including a deployment for Operation Musketeer, the Suez crisis. It remained at Gordon Barracks, Hameln, Germany, Germany from 1964 to 1999.

From 1950 to 1995 the regiment included 29 Field Squadron, including the period 1977-82 during which the regiment was 4th Armoured Division Engineer Regiment.

In the 21st century it became a close support regiment supporting the 20th Armoured Infantry Brigade. Under the Army 2020 Refine programme, the regiment returned from Germany and re-roled as an EOD and Search Regiment. 35 Engineer Regiment is now based at Carver Barracks, Wimbish.

The regiment will re-role back to its historic close support role, as of December 2025

== Squadrons ==
Today the regiment consists of:

- 35 Engineer Regiment (EOD&S), at Carver Barracks, Wimbish
  - 15 Headquarters and Support Squadron
  - 17 Field Squadron
  - 21 Field Squadron
  - 29 Field Squadron
