= 32 Engineer Regiment (United Kingdom) =

- Active: January 1947 – July 1957; 1964 – September 1977; 1980 – Present
- Country: United Kingdom
- Branch: British Army
- Role: Engineer
- Size: Regiment; 629 personnel
- Part of: 7th Light Mechanised Brigade Combat Team
- Website: 32 Engr Regt RE

32 Engineer Regiment is a regiment of the British Army's Royal Engineers.

== History ==
32 Assault Engineer Regiment was formed in January 1947 in Hameln after the re-designation of 42nd Assault Engineer Regiment. Shortly afterwards, the regiment disbanded in 1957. However, it was reformed in 1964 at Hohne as 32nd Armoured Engineer Regiment and assigned to I Corps. In April 1969, the regiment was re-designated as 32nd Field Engineer Regiment and was assigned to the 1st Armoured Division. By 1972, the regiment deployed to Northern Ireland. The regiment then disbanded for the second time in 1977 as a result of the Mason Review.

In 1980, the regiment was once again reformed at Verden and was re-titled 32 Armoured Engineer Regiment. In 1981, the regiment moved to Munsterlager and later served in the Gulf War. In 1993, after the Options for Change reforms, the regiment was assigned to the 7th Armoured Brigade as a close support engineer regiment and served in Bosnia in 1995 and 1997. The regiment later deployed to Kosovo in 2000 and to Iraq on Operation Telic in 2003. Under the initial Army 2020 reforms, the regiment moved to (Close Support) Engineer Group and saw the disbandment of 39 Armoured Engineer Squadron. Following the Army 2020 Refine reforms, the regiment was assigned to 12 (Force Support) Engineer Group. In 2022 they came under the command of 7th Light Mechanised Brigade Combat Team.

== Structure ==
Structure of the regiment after the initial Army 2020 reforms:

- 32 Engineer Regiment, in Catterick
  - 2 Headquarters and Support Squadron
  - 26 Field Squadron
  - 31 Field Squadron
  - 37 Field Squadron
  - REME Light Aid Detachment
