= 75 Engineer Regiment (United Kingdom) =

- Active: 1967 – Present
- Country: United Kingdom
- Branch: British Army
- Role: Combat engineering
- Size: 4 squadrons 504 personnel
- Part of: 8th Engineer Brigade: 12 (Force Support) Engineer Group
- Garrison/HQ: Regimental Headquarters – Warrington

75 Engineer Regiment is a Royal Engineers regiment, part of the British Army's Army Reserve.

== History ==
In 1967, the regiment consisted of 125 and 143 Squadrons) from the former North Midland Divisional Engineers. In 1993 and 1999 respectively, 125 (Staffordshire) Field Squadron at Stoke-on-Trent and 143 Plant Squadron at Walsall fell under the command the 75th Engineer Regiment. 143 Plant Squadron was subsequently disbanded, but 125 Field Squadron was expanded with a Plant Troop at Cannock. Under the initial Army 2020 restructuring, the regiment has been paired with the 36th Engineer Regiment. Additionally, the regiment will move 12 (Force Support) Engineer Group.

On 4 February 2021, the regiment formally took responsibility for the Isle of Man Army Reserve Centre. The Commanding Officer later issued a statement indicating he wished to expand the Army Reserve presence on the island, and eventually become part of the regiment.

== Current organisation ==
The regiment's current organisation is as follows:

- Regimental Headquarters and Headquarters Troop, at Peninsula Barracks, Warrington
- 106 (West Riding) Field Squadron, at Bailey Barracks, Sheffield – formerly part of 32 Engineer Regiment, but transferred out following Army 2020 Refine
  - 1 Troop, Sheffield and Batley

CIS Troop Aldershot are now 2 Troop 106 Field Squadron

- 107 (Lancaster and Cheshire) Field Squadron, in Birkenhead
  - 2 Troop, at Peninsula Barracks, Warrington
- 202 Field Squadron, in Failsworth, Manchester
  - Royal Engineers Manx Troop, at Douglas, Isle of Man
- 350 (The Robin Hood Foresters) Field Squadron, at Foresters House, in Nottingham
  - 3 Troop, at Wallis Barracks, Chesterfield
