= Carver Barracks =

British Army base in Essex

- Debden, Uttlesford
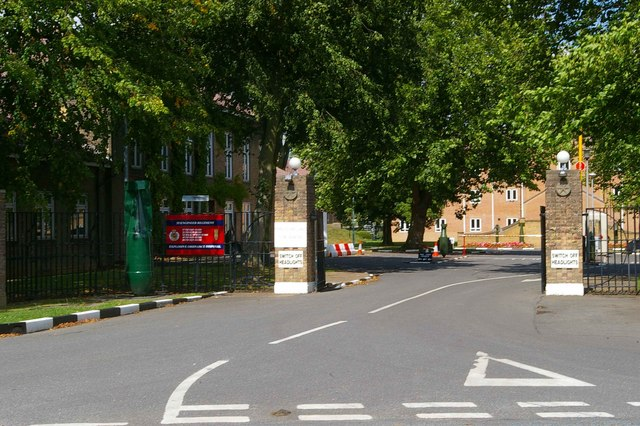
- Entrance to Carver Barracks

Site information
- Type: Barracks
- Owner: Ministry of Defence
- Operator: British Army

Location
- Location within Essex
- Coordinates: 51.98757°N 0.28416°E

Site history
- Built: 1935–1937
- Built for: War Office
- In use: 1975–present

Garrison information
- Occupants: 33 Engineer Regiment and 35 Engineer Regiment

Carver Barracks is a British Army base on the former site of RAF Debden, approximately 1 mile north of the village of Debden, in Essex. The nearest town is Saffron Walden. It is occupied by explosive ordnance disposal & search regiments of the Royal Engineers.

== History ==
The airfield was built in 1935–37 and the runways laid in 1940. It was first occupied by the Royal Air Force (RAF), followed by the United States Army Air Forces (USAAF) in September 1942. It was returned to RAF control on 5 September 1945. After the RAF withdrew from the station in 1974, the site was handed to the British Army and re-established as Carver Barracks in 1975. The barracks were named after Field Marshal Lord Carver, a former Royal Tank Regiment officer.

In the 1980s, Carver Barracks was home to the 1st The Queen's Dragoon Guards, the 13th/18th Royal Hussars, the 9th/12th Royal Lancers and the 16th/5th The Queen's Royal Lancers – all armoured reconnaissance regiments. The site is now home to 33 Engineer Regiment (Explosive Ordnance Disposal and Search) and 35 Engineer Regiment (Explosive Ordnance Disposal).

== Based units ==
The following units are based at Carver Barracks.

- 33 Engineer Regiment (EOD&S), Royal Engineers
- 35 Engineer Regiment (EOD&S), Royal Engineers

== Future ==
In November 2016, the Ministry of Defence announced that the site would close in 2031 as part of the Better Defence Estate plan. In November 2021, it was announced that Carver Barracks would be retained and remain open to support the delivery of Future Soldier.
