= Peninsula Barracks, Warrington =

Peninsula Barracks
- Warrington
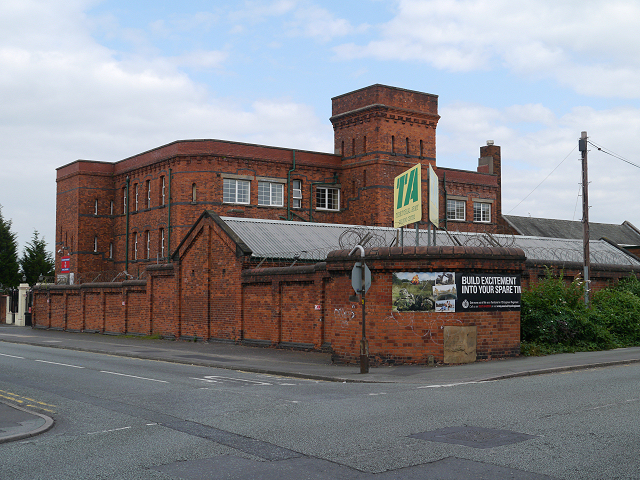
- Peninsula Barracks

Site information
- Type: Barracks
- Owner: Ministry of Defence
- Operator: British Army

Location
- Location within Cheshire
- Coordinates: 53.40032°N 2.58171°W

Site history
- Built: 1878
- Built for: War Office
- In use: 1878-Present

Garrison information
- Occupants: 75 Engineer Regiment; 4th Battalion, Duke of Lancaster's Regiment

Peninsula Barracks is a military installation on O'Leary Street in Warrington, England.

== History ==
The barracks were built in the Fortress Gothic Revival Style and, although construction started a few years earlier, they were opened as Orford Barracks in 1878. Their creation took place as part of the Cardwell Reforms which encouraged the localisation of British military forces.

The barracks were intended as depot for the two battalions of the 8th (The King's) Regiment of Foot. Under the Childers Reforms, the 8th Regiment of Foot evolved to become the King's Regiment (Liverpool) with its depot at the barracks in 1881.

The barracks were also intended as depot for the 40th (2nd Somersetshire) Regiment and the 82nd Regiment of Foot (Prince of Wales's Volunteers). Under the Childers Reforms the 40th and 82nd regiments, together with the Warrington-based 4th Royal Lancashire Militia (The Duke of Lancaster's Own Light Infantry) amalgamated to form the South Lancashire Regiment in 1881.

The King's Regiment (Liverpool) moved out to Seaforth Barracks in 1910 leaving the barracks as the mobilisation point for the South Lancashire Regiment at the start of the First World War.

After the Second World War the barracks became the home of the 4th Battalion the South Lancashire Regiment (The Prince of Wales's Volunteers); although the regiment was disbanded in 1958 the battalion transferred to the Lancashire Regiment and continued to be based at the barracks. This battalion was reduced to company status in 1967 and that company transferred to the Queen's Lancashire Regiment in 1970.

In 1975 the barracks became the headquarters of 5th/8th (Volunteer) Battalion the King's Regiment and in 1999 they became the home of B (Cheshire) Company of the King's and Cheshire Regiment, which subsequently left in 2005 prior to the regiment's amalgamation. Since 2007 they have been the home of a squadron of 75 Engineer Regiment.

In 2019, a detached platoon of A (Ladysmith) Company, 4th Battalion Duke of Lancaster's Regiment, based in Liverpool, was raised at the barracks, after a 14-year absence of infantry in the town.

== Current units ==
- 75 Engineer Regiment
  - Regimental Headquarters
  - 2 Troop, 107 (Lancaster and Cheshire) Field Squadron
- 4th Battalion, Duke of Lancaster's Regiment
  - 3 Platoon, A (Ladysmith) Company
