= MOD Woodbridge =

British Army installation in Suffolk, England

MOD Woodbridge
- Near Woodbridge, Suffolk in England
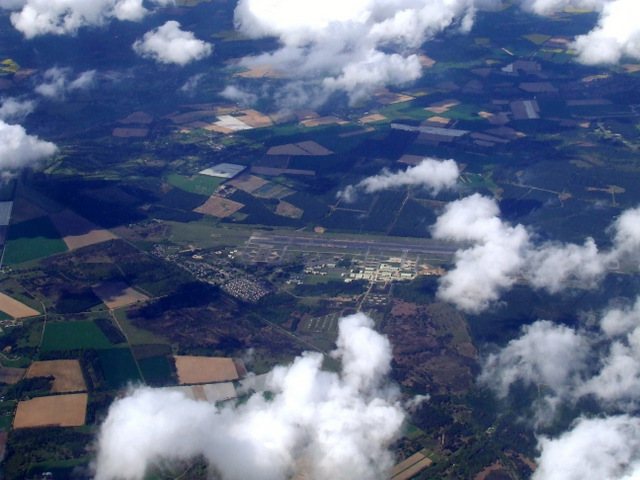
- MOD Woodbridge from the air.

Site information
- Type: Barracks and training airfield
- Owner: Ministry of Defence
- Operator: British Army
- Controlled by: Royal Engineers

Location
- Location in Suffolk
- Coordinates: 52°05′16.08″N 001°24′02.97″E
- Area: 369 hectares

Site history
- Built: 1943
- In use: Royal Air Force (1943–1948); United States Air Force (1952–1993); British Army (2006–present)

Ministry of Defence Woodbridge or MOD Woodbridge is a military installation located near the town of Woodbridge, in Suffolk, England. The site opened in 2006 and is operated by the British Army and incorporates both Rock Barracks and Woodbridge Airfield. The barracks are home to two Royal Engineers regiments. The airfield is used periodically by helicopters of the Army Air Corps for training exercises.

The site was previously known as RAF Woodbridge and had periods where it was operated by the Royal Air Force and United States Air Force. The RAF station closed in August 1993.

== History ==
=== RAF Woodbridge ===
Constructed in 1943 as a Royal Air Force (RAF) airfield during the Second World War to assist damaged aircraft to land on their return from raids over Germany, it was later used by the United States Air Force during the Cold War, being the primary home for the 79th Tactical Fighter Squadron and the 78th Tactical Fighter Squadron and squadrons of the 81st Fighter Wing under various designations until 1993. For many years, the 81st Fighter Wing also operated from nearby RAF Bentwaters, with Bentwaters and Woodbridge being known as the "Twin Bases". The RAF station closed in August 1993.

=== Reactivation ===
In 2001, the Ministry of Defence announced that £100 million would be invested in the Woodbridge site in order to accommodate British Army personnel. Due to budgetary constraints and commitments to Operation Telic (the UK's contribution to the Iraq War), the start of work at Woodbridge was delayed until January 2004.

On 1 September 2006, the former Woodbridge site was split up and the two parts renamed as Woodbridge Airfield and Rock Barracks.

=== Airfield ===
Woodbridge Airfield is used by Army Air Corps helicopters for training exercises. During August 2016, the airfield was used for testing the Airbus A400M Atlas.

=== Cancelled closure ===
In November 2016, the Ministry of Defence announced that MOD Woodbridge would close by 2027. However, in February 2019, following detailed assessment work, the Ministry of Defence concluded the retention of MOD Woodbridge supports the military requirement of the Army, and its closure was cancelled.

== Based units ==
The following units are based at Rock Barracks.

- 23 Parachute Engineer Regiment, Royal Engineers
  - 12 Parachute Headquarters and Support Squadron
  - 9 Parachute Squadron
  - 51 Parachute Squadron
- 28 Engineer Regiment (C-CBRN), Royal Engineers
  - Regimental Headquarters (moving from RAF Honington, by 2024)
  - 42 Field Squadron (C-CBRN)
  - 77 Field Squadron (C-CBRN)
