= Kinloss Barracks =

British Army installation and airfield in Moray, Scotland

- Kinloss, Moray, in Scotland
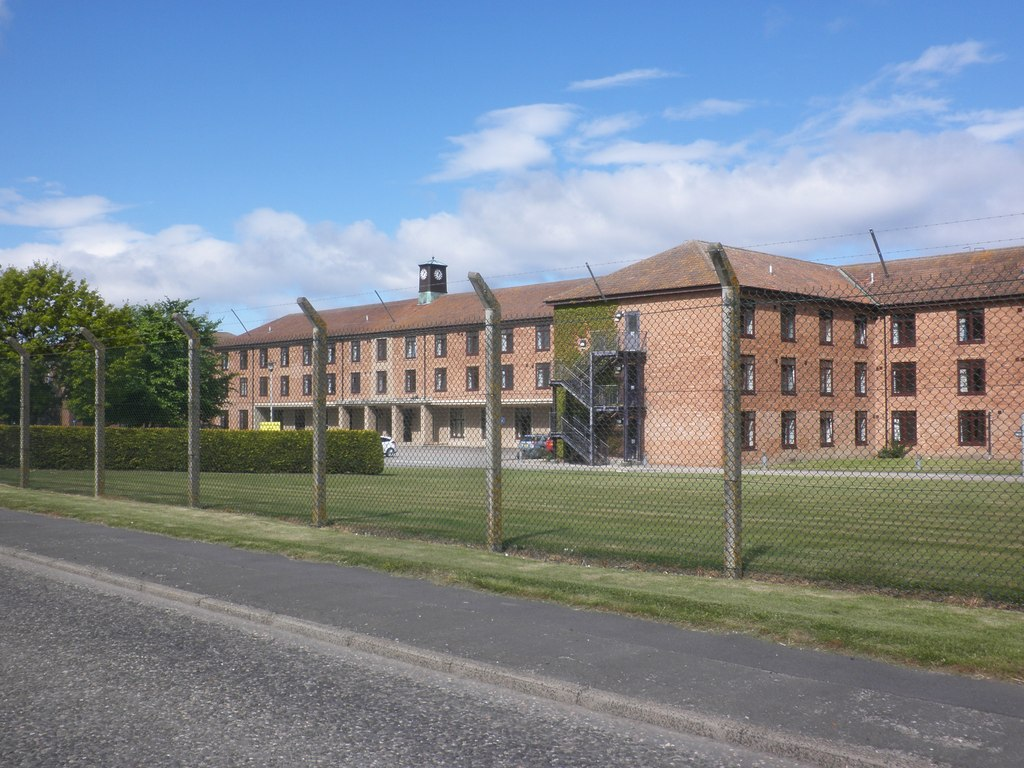
- Kinloss Barracks

Site information
- Type: Army Barracks
- Owner: Ministry of Defence
- Operator: British Army
- Controlled by: Royal Engineers
- Condition: Operational

Location
- Location within Moray
- Coordinates: 57°38′58″N 003°33′38″W
- Area: 666 hectares

Site history
- Built: 1938 (as RAF Kinloss)
- In use: 2012 – present (as barracks)

Garrison information
- Garrison: 39 Engineer Regiment Royal Engineers

Kinloss Barracks is a military installation located near the village of Kinloss, on the Moray Firth in the north of Scotland. Until 2012 it was a Royal Air Force (RAF) station, RAF Kinloss.

== History ==
=== RAF Kinloss (1939–2011) ===
Kinloss was established as a Royal Air Force station on 1 April 1939 and served as a training airfield during the Second World War. Following the end of the conflict, the station was transferred to RAF Coastal Command, where it played a central role in monitoring Soviet naval activity, particularly ships and submarines operating in the Norwegian Sea.

For several decades, Kinloss served as the principal base for the RAF's fleet of Hawker Siddeley Nimrod MR2 maritime patrol aircraft. A planned transition to the upgraded Nimrod MRA4 was cancelled in 2010 as part of the Strategic Defence and Security Review. With the withdrawal of the Nimrod fleet, the RAF deemed Kinloss surplus to operational requirements, and regular flying activities ended on 31 July 2011.

=== Transfer to British Army (2011–2012) ===
On 18 July 2011, the Ministry of Defence announced that RAF Kinloss would be transferred to the British Army and re‑purposed as a barracks, with the arrival of army units anticipated in 2014 or 2015. A subsequent statement issued in November 2011 confirmed that 39 Engineer Regiment (Air Support) of the Royal Engineers would relocate from Waterbeach Barracks, near Cambridge to Kinloss in July 2012. It was expected that 930 service personnel and their families would move to Kinloss as part of the transition. The number of army personnel stationed at Kinloss following the changeover represented a reduction of about 41% compared with the staffing levels maintained during its period of RAF operation.

After 73 years as an RAF station, control of Kinloss transferred to the British Army at 12:00 on 26 July 2012. A ceremony was held at the station, attended by eight former RAF Kinloss station commanders, the final station commander, Group Captain JJ Johnston, and the Lord Lieutenant of Moray. The RAF colours were lowered for the last time and British Army colours raised to mark the new chapter in Kinloss's history.

=== Barracks use (2012–present) ===
Following the army's move to Kinloss, the refurbishment of four barrack blocks was completed in 2013. The project included the upgrade of utility, laundry, shower and toilet facilities and the installation of new fire safety features, carpets and furniture.

In 2020, UK Prime Minister Boris Johnson visited Kinloss Barracks to receive a briefing on the deployment of three RAF Westland Puma helicopters supporting the National Health Service, and to observe how personnel at the site were assisting in the response COVID-19 pandemic.

==== Flying activity ====
The airfield continued to be maintained by the RAF as a relief landing ground for aircraft stationed at nearby RAF Lossiemouth and remained in use by the Moray Flying Club. It could not be booked by other aircraft as a diversion airfield or for refuelling stops.

Regular flying operations temporarily resumed at Kinloss in 2020 when the first of the RAF's Boeing Poseidon MRA1 aircraft arrived in the UK from the United States in February of that year. The aircraft initially operated from Kinloss Barracks while infrastructure work was undertaken at RAF Lossiemouth to accommodate the new fleet. Lossiemouth's airfield was closed between 10 August and 16 October 2020 to allow resurfacing of the intersection of its two runways. During this period, routine Eurofighter Typhoon FGR4 training activity was relocated to Kinloss. A second Poseidon aircraft arrived before both the Poseidon and the Typhoon detachments returned to Lossiemouth upon the airfield's reopening in October 2020.

Fixed‑wing flying at Kinloss concluded in 2021 following the permanent closure of the runway, after which the military aerodrome traffic zone was formally withdrawn in January 2022. As a result, the Moray Flying Club relocated its activities to RAF Lossiemouth.

Aircraft from RAF Lossiemouth utilised the former airfield in November 2025 to practice operating from an austere environment. Tactical Air Traffic Controllers and personnel from 39 Engineer Regiment worked together at short-notice to prepare Kinloss's runway for Typhoon and Poseidon aircraft landing within 24 hours.

The Army Basing Programme, part of the wider Army 2020 programme, is expected to result in further army personnel relocating to Kinloss Barracks by 2022.

==== Other activities ====
Orbex, a British commercial spaceflight company, established a test facility at Kinloss in early 2022. The site was primarily used for ground testing of launch procedures and operations for the company's flagship orbital launch vehicle, Prime, a small-lift rocket designed to deliver small satellites into low Earth orbit. While integration and testing activities were conducted at Kinloss, actual orbital launches were planned to take place from the company's planned launch site, Space Hub Sutherland, located on the A' Mhòine peninsula in the Highlands. Orbex entered insolvency in February 2026 with operations ending.

== Based units ==
The following notable units are based at Kinloss Barracks.

=== British Army ===
- Royal Engineers (8 Engineer Brigade, 12 (Force Support) Engineer Group)
  - 39 Engineer Regiment (Air Support)
    - 34 Field Squadron
    - 48 Field Squadron
    - 53 Field Squadron
    - 60 Headquarters & Support Squadron
    - 65 Field Support Squadron
  - 71 Engineer Regiment (Air Support) (Army Reserve)
    - 124 Field Squadron (Air Support)
      - 236 Troop

Communications masts at Kinloss Barracks, operated as part of the Defence High Frequency Communications Service

=== Defence High Frequency Communications Service (DHFCS) ===
- DHFCS Kinloss

== Operations ==
=== Royal Engineers ===
39 Engineer Regiment is tasked with providing air support engineering, such as repair of airfield operating surfaces, to both the RAF and to the British Army, and is the only regular regiment focused on providing such a capability. Around 800 personnel are based at Kinloss.

=== Defence High Frequency Communications Service ===
Kinloss Barracks is home to a high frequency receiver station and network control centre forming part of the Defence High Frequency Communications Service (DHFCS). Prior to 2003, the system at Kinloss was operated by No. 81 Signals Unit (Detachment North) of the RAF. The station is now operated by Babcock International Group on behalf of the Ministry of Defence.

== See also ==
- Armed forces in Scotland
- Military history of Scotland
- List of British Army installations
