= 33 Engineer Regiment (EOD&S) =

- Active: 1973-present
- Country: United Kingdom
- Branch: British Army
- Role: Engineer
- Size: Regiment; 396 personnel
- Part of: Royal Engineers
- Garrison/HQ: Carver Barracks, Essex
- Website: Official Facebook page

33 Engineer Regiment (EOD&S) is a regiment of the British Army's Royal Engineers. It is based at Carver Barracks, Essex.

== Organization ==
Today the regiment consists of:

- 33 Engineer Regiment (EOD&S), in Wimbish
  - Regimental HQ and HQ Troop
  - 49 Field Squadron (Explosive Ordnance Disposal and Search)
  - 58 Field Squadron (Explosive Ordnance Disposal and Search)
  - Explosive Ordnance Clearance Group
- Previous Squadrons, no longer part of 33 Engineer Regiment (EOD&S)
  - 821 Explosive Ordnance Disposal and Search Squadron. Disbanded in 2023.
    - 821 EOD&S Sqn supported HQ 3 Cdo Brigade and HQ 16 AA Brigade with Commando and Airborne trained EOD&S soldiers.
