= 39 Engineer Regiment (United Kingdom) =

39 Engineer Regiment 39 Engineer Regiment (Air Support)
- Regimental badge
- Active: 1951–present
- Country: United Kingdom
- Branch: British Army
- Role: Combat engineering
- Size: Five squadrons 774 personnel
- Part of: 12th (Force Support) Engineer Group
- Garrison/HQ: Kinloss Barracks, Kinloss
- Engagements: War in Afghanistan

39 Engineer Regiment (39 Engr Regt) is a battalion-sized regiment of the British Army formed in 1951 and based in Kinloss in Scotland.

== History ==
It was in Kenya in the early 1950s, up until 1955, and elements took part in anti-Mau Mau operations.

An announcement in November 2011 confirmed that 39 Engineer Regiment (Air Support) RE would move from Waterbeach Barracks, near Cambridge, to Kinloss, in July 2012. It was expected that 930 service personnel and their families would move at this time.

As of 2016, the regiment consisted of five squadrons:

- 39 Engineer Regiment, Kinloss Barracks
  - 60 Headquarters and Support Squadron
  - 34 Field Squadron
  - 48 Field Squadron
  - 53 Field Squadron
  - 65 Field Support Squadron
  - REME Workshop
