= Wimbish =

Village in Essex, England

Coordinates: 52°00′N 0°19′E

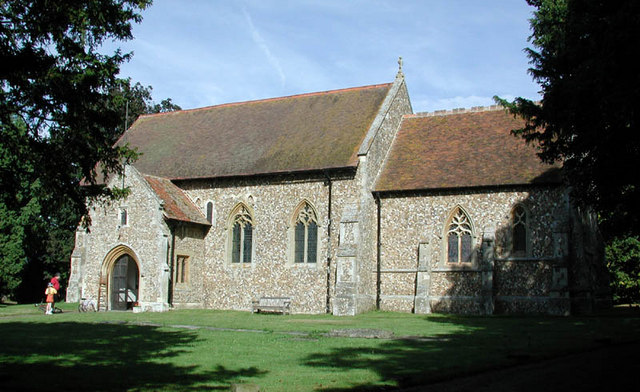
- All Saints’ Church, Wimbish

- Location within Essex
- Population: 1,476 (Parish, 2021)
- Civil parish: Wimbish
- District: Uttlesford
- Shire county: Essex
- Region: East
- Country: England
- Sovereign state: United Kingdom
- Post town: Saffron Walden
- Postcode district: CB10
- Police: Essex
- Fire: Essex
- Ambulance: East of England
- UK Parliament: North West Essex

Wimbish is a village and civil parish in the Uttlesford district of Essex, England. It is 4 miles (6 km) south-east of Saffron Walden, its post town. The first recorded mention of the village was in 1042, when it was referred to as Winebisc. It was subsequently referred to as Wimbeis in the Domesday Book of 1086. The village has its own non-denominational primary school (Wimbish Primary School) and a church (All Saints). The church tower was partly destroyed by lightning in 1756, and was rebuilt in brick but was later taken down again in 1883. At the 2021 census the parish had a population of 1,476.

== Governance ==
Wimbish is part of the electoral ward called Wimbish and Debden. The population of this ward at the 2011 census was 2,407. Women in the ward had the third highest life expectancy at birth, 96.5 years, of any ward in England and Wales in 2016.

== See also ==
- The Hundred Parishes
