= Kinloss, Scotland =

Coordinates: 57.637°N 3.563°W

Kinloss: Scottish Gaelic: Cinn Lois
- War Memorial at Kinloss Abbey

- Location within Moray
- Population: 1,440 (2020)
- Council area: Moray
- Country: Scotland
- Sovereign state: United Kingdom
- Police: Scotland
- Fire: Scottish
- Ambulance: Scottish
- UK Parliament: Moray West, Nairn and Strathspey

Kinloss (Gaelic: Cinn Lois) is a village in Moray, Scotland. It is located near the shore of Findhorn Bay, around 3 miles (5 km) from Findhorn and 2.5 miles (4 km) from Forres. Northeast of the village is Kinloss Barracks, formerly RAF Kinloss which opened on 1 April 1939.

It is believed that 1,000 aircraft were dismantled at Kinloss, after the end of the Second World War. Investigations are on for possible radioactive contamination in RAF Kinloss.

The Cistercian Kinloss Abbey was created in 1150 by King David. Under abbot Robert Reid the abbey became a centre of academic excellence in the 1530s. It now lies almost completely ruined. The abbey and the town were part of the feudal Barony of Muirton.

== Climate ==
Like the rest of the plains of Scotland, Kinloss has an oceanic climate (Köppen: Cfb). It is one of the mildest climates in this latitude, being milder than Angoon, Alaska for almost identical latitudinal coordinates, both influenced by the location on the west coast of the temperate zone, with freezing nights on the second. Although the Scottish village is on the mainland island of the United Kingdom, its record high is also higher, demonstrating that it is not just the effect of maritime.

Climate data for Kinloss (7 m or 23 ft asl, averages 1991–2020, extremes 1961–1990)
Month	Jan	Feb	Mar	Apr	May	Jun	Jul	Aug	Sep	Oct	Nov	Dec	Year
Record high °C (°F)	15.1 (59.2)	16.1 (61.0)	18.2 (64.8)	22.7 (72.9)	27.2 (81.0)	27.7 (81.9)	30.6 (87.1)	28.7 (83.7)	26.2 (79.2)	22.3 (72.1)	18.0 (64.4)	15.5 (59.9)	30.6 (87.1)
Mean daily maximum °C (°F)	7.0 (44.6)	7.7 (45.9)	9.5 (49.1)	12.1 (53.8)	14.7 (58.5)	16.9 (62.4)	19.0 (66.2)	18.7 (65.7)	16.5 (61.7)	13.0 (55.4)	9.6 (49.3)	7.1 (44.8)	12.7 (54.8)
Mean daily minimum °C (°F)	0.9 (33.6)	1.0 (33.8)	2.3 (36.1)	4.0 (39.2)	6.2 (43.2)	9.2 (48.6)	11.2 (52.2)	10.9 (51.6)	9.0 (48.2)	6.1 (43.0)	3.2 (37.8)	0.8 (33.4)	5.4 (41.7)
Record low °C (°F)	−15.5 (4.1)	−14.4 (6.1)	−10.7 (12.7)	−7.3 (18.9)	−3.4 (25.9)	−0.5 (31.1)	1.5 (34.7)	1.3 (34.3)	−1.2 (29.8)	−3.5 (25.7)	−10.7 (12.7)	−16.0 (3.2)	−16.0 (3.2)
Average rainfall mm (inches)	49.8 (1.96)	43.0 (1.69)	39.1 (1.54)	41.8 (1.65)	50.5 (1.99)	59.4 (2.34)	61.7 (2.43)	66.9 (2.63)	66.1 (2.60)	72.3 (2.85)	56.5 (2.22)	55.5 (2.19)	662.6 (26.09)
Average rainy days (≥ 1 mm)	11.7	10.3	10.0	9.2	10.4	11.8	12.0	12.0	11.4	12.7	12.7	12.2	136.4
Mean monthly sunshine hours	53.4	80.7	118.9	151.4	197.8	158.6	155.0	146.2	123.6	92.3	62.8	42.9	1,383.6
Source: Met Office

== Education ==
Kinloss Primary School serves the village of Kinloss and surrounding area including the nearby village of Findhorn.

Secondary students are in the catchment zone of Forres Academy in Forres.

== See also ==
- List of listed buildings in Kinloss
