= Royal Army Medical Corps =

Medical arm of the British Army

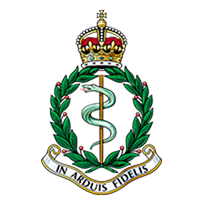
- Cap badge since the coronation of HM King Charles III
- Active: 1898 – 15 November 2024
- Country: United Kingdom
- Branch: British Army
- Type: Medical arm of the British Army
- Role: Medical support
- Part of: Army Medical Services
- Garrison/HQ: Staff College, Camberley, traditionally Keogh Barracks
- Nickname: The Med Corps
- Patron: Saint Luke
- Mottos: In Arduis Fidelis (Faithful in Adversity)
- Colors: Dull cherry, royal blue, old gold
- March: Quick: Here's a Health unto His Majesty (arr. A.J. Thornburrow); Slow: Her Bright Smile Haunts Me Still (J Campbell arr. Brown)
- Anniversaries: Corps Day (23 June)

Commanders
- Colonel-in-Chief: Prince Richard, Duke of Gloucester
- Colonel Commandant: Brigadier Christopher Parker

Insignia
- Tactical recognition flash

The Royal Army Medical Corps (RAMC) was a specialist corps in the British Army that provided medical services to all Army personnel and their families, in war and in peace.

On 15 November 2024, the corps was amalgamated with the Royal Army Dental Corps and Queen Alexandra's Royal Army Nursing Corps to form the Royal Army Medical Service.

== History ==
=== Origins ===
Medical services in the British military date back the founding of the English Army in January 1661 following the Stuart Restoration of Charles II in 1660. Prior to this, from as early as the 13th century, there are records of surgeons and physicians being appointed to attend the English army in times of war; but this was the first time a career was provided for a Medical Officer (MO), both in peacetime and in war. For much of the next two hundred years, army medical provision was mostly arranged on a regimental basis, with each battalion arranging its own hospital facilities and medical supplies. An element of oversight was provided by the appointment of three officials: a surgeon-general, a physician-general and an apothecary general.

==== Army Medical Board ====
In 1793, an Army Medical Board was formed (consisting of the surgeon-general, physician-general and Inspector of Regimental Infirmaries), which promoted a more centralised approach drawing on concurrent civilian healthcare practices. The Board set up five General (as opposed to regimental) Military Hospitals: four in the naval ports of Chatham, Deal, Plymouth and Gosport (Portsmouth), and one (known as York Hospital) in Chelsea. These hospitals received large numbers of sick and injured soldiers from the French Revolutionary Wars (so much so that by 1799 additional General Military Hospitals were set up in Yarmouth, Harwich and Colchester Barracks); the Board, however, was criticised, for both high expenditure and poor management. By the end of the century, the Board had been disestablished, and most of the General Hospitals were closed or repurposed not long afterwards. By 1807, the only General Hospitals in operation were York Hospital (which was close to the Royal Hospital, Chelsea, where invalided soldiers were routinely sent for pension assessment) and the hospital at Parkhurst (which was attached to the army's Invalid Depôt on the Isle of Wight, where soldiers invalided home from service overseas were initially sent).

==== Army Medical Department ====
In 1810, the offices of Surgeon-general and Physician-general were abolished and a new Army Medical Department was established, overseen by a board chaired by a Director-General of the Medical Department. James McGrigor served in this role from 1815 to 1851: McGrigor, who has been called the Father of Army Medicine, had served as principal medical officer under the Duke of Wellington during the Peninsular War. During that time, he had introduced significant changes in the organisation of the army's medical services, placing them on a far more formal footing: together with George Guthrie, he instituted the use of dedicated ambulance wagons to transport the wounded, and set up a series of temporary hospitals (formed of prefabricated huts brought over from Britain) to aid the evacuation of wounded soldiers from the front line.

After the end of the Peninsular War, Fort Pitt in Chatham became the de facto headquarters of the Army Medical Department (the Invalid Depôt having relocated to Chatham from the Isle of Wight). A General Military Hospital was established on the site, which took on many of the functions (and most of the patients) of the old York Hospital. The influence of the Director-General grew, and from 1833 he was given sole charge of the department. That same year the (hitherto separate) Irish Medical Board was merged into the department, as was the Ordnance Medical Department twenty years later.

The Crimean War, however, would lay bare the inadequacies of the Army Medical Department (and many others). In 1854, there were only 163 surgeons on the Department's books; the Army had just two ambulance wagons, both of which were left behind in Bulgaria, and it relied for stretcher bearers on the Hospital Conveyance Corps (which was made up of pensioners and others deemed too infirm to fight). Two base hospitals were set up in Scutari, more than 300 miles from the front. Within weeks of arriving, more than half the British force had been incapacitated by disease (mainly typhus, dysentery and cholera); and in the space of seven months some 10,000 British servicemen out of a total of 28,000 had died.

=== The Department after Crimea ===
In June 1855, a Medical Staff Corps was established (in place of the Hospital Conveyance Corps, which had by then been merged into the Land Transport Corps). It was formed of nine companies, overseen by a single officer, and had its headquarters at Fort Pitt. The Medical Staff Corps was set up to provide orderlies and stretcher bearers (later it was renamed the Army Hospital Corps, but reverted to its original title in 1884). The officers known as purveyors, who were responsible for medical provisioning, were formed into a separate Purveyors' Department by a Royal Warrant of 1861; nine years later it was merged into the Control Department, and later became part of the Army Service Corps. In 1857, in response to the Crimean debacle, a Royal Commission had been appointed for the improvement of sanitary conditions in Army barracks and hospitals; it recommended (among other things) the establishment of an Army Medical School, which was set up in 1860 at Fort Pitt Hospital before moving in 1863 to the new Royal Victoria Military Hospital at Netley outside Southampton.

Netley functioned as a general hospital, but much of the army's medical work continued to be carried out at a regimental level. At the time a regiment of 1,044 men would have a medical staff of one surgeon and two assistants (with an additional assistant being appointed if the regiment was stationed abroad, so as to allow the senior assistant to remain at home with the companies appointed to the depot).

The regimental basis of appointment for MOs continued until 1873, when a coordinated army medical service was set up. To join, a doctor needed to be qualified, single, and aged at least 21, and then undergo a further examination in physiology, surgery, medicine, zoology, botany and physical geography including meteorology, and also to satisfy various other requirements (including having dissected the whole body at least once and having attended 12 midwifery cases); the results were published in three classes by the Army Medical School. In 1884, the medical officers of the Army Medical Department were brought together with the quartermasters who provided their supplies to form the Army Medical Staff, which was given command of the Medical Staff Corps (which consisted entirely of other ranks).

Nevertheless, there was much unhappiness in the Army Medical Service in the following years as medical officers did not have military rank but "advantages corresponding to relative military rank" (such as choice of quarters, rates of lodging money, servants, fuel and light, allowances on account of injuries received in action, and pensions and allowances to widows and families). They had inferior pay in India, excessive amounts of Indian and colonial service (being required to serve in India six years at a stretch), and less recognition in honours and awards. They did not have their own identity as did the Army Service Corps, whose officers did have military rank. A number of complaints were published, and the British Medical Journal campaigned loudly. For over two years from 27 July 1887 there were no recruits to the Army Medical Department. A parliamentary committee reported in 1890, highlighting the doctors' injustices. There was no response from the Secretary of State for War. The British Medical Association, the Royal College of Physicians and others redoubled their protests. Eventually, by authority of a royal warrant dated 25 June 1898, officers and soldiers providing medical services were incorporated into a new body known as the Royal Army Medical Corps; its first Colonel-in-Chief was Prince Arthur, Duke of Connaught.

=== The Corps in the 20th century ===
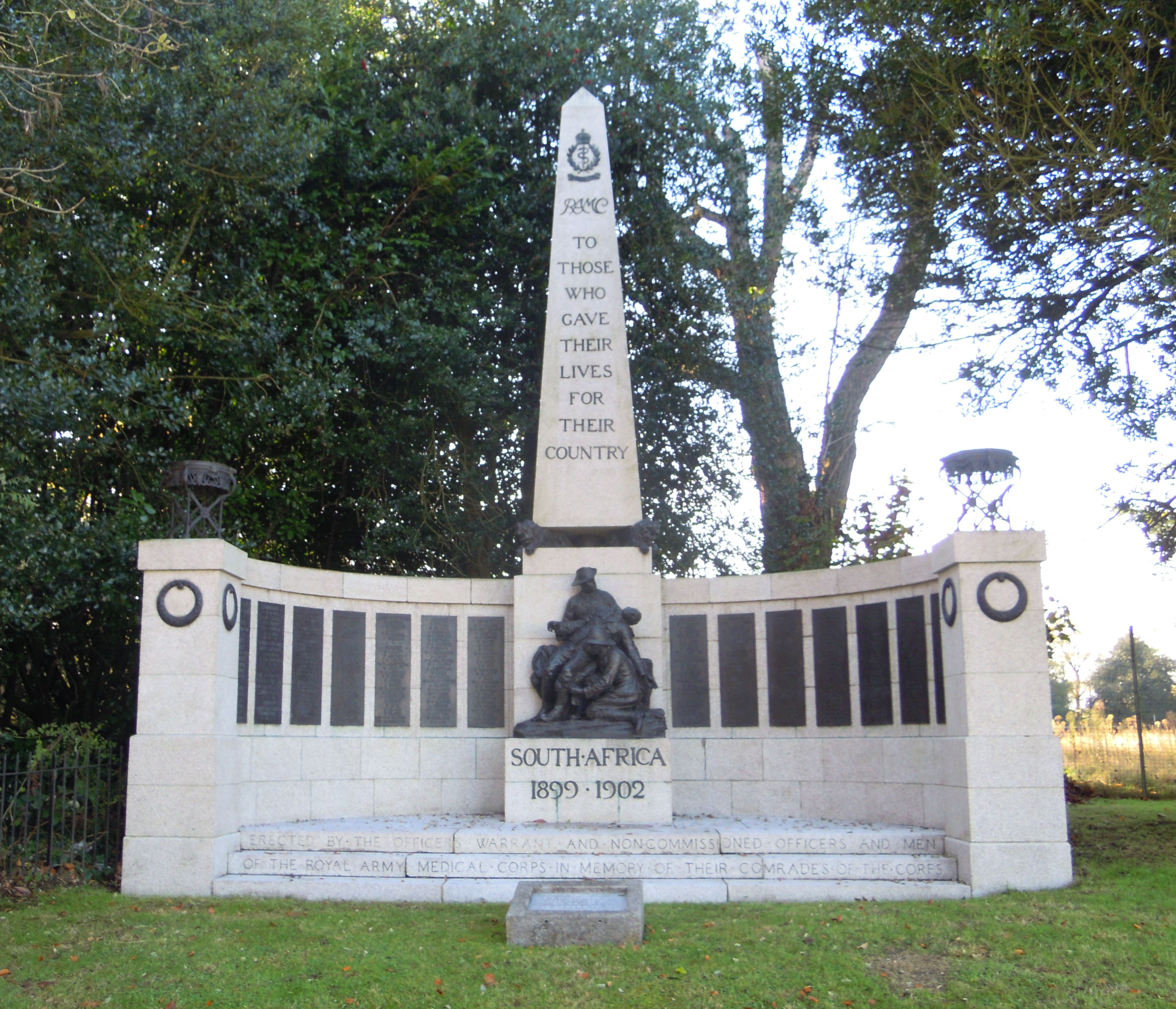
The RAMC Memorial for the Boer War at Aldershot in Hampshire

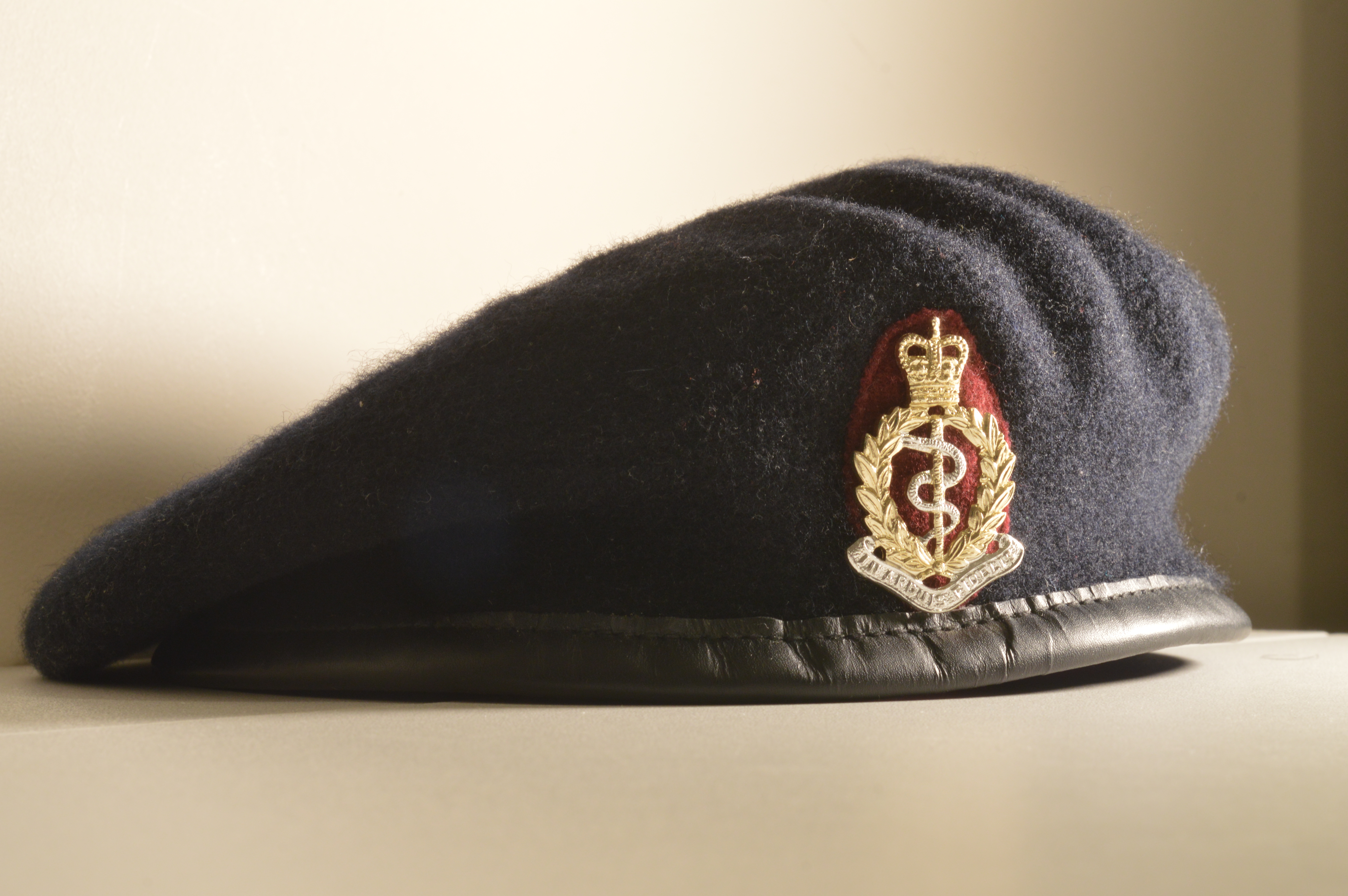
Beret and cap badge used by the RAMC until its amalgamation in November 2024

The RAMC began to develop during the Second Boer War of 1899–1902. Civilian doctors working in South Africa as volunteers—such as Sir Frederick Treves, Sir George Makins, Sir Howard Henry Tooth and Professor Alexander Ogston—who, having seen how unprepared to deal with epidemics the RAMC and the Army itself were, decided that a radical reform was needed. Chief among them was Alfred Fripp, who had been chosen by the Imperial Yeomanry Hospital Committee to order all the necessary materials and medical personnel, and oversee the setting-up of a private hospital at Deelfontein to cater, initially, for 520 'sick and wounded.' The contrast between the smooth working of the IYH at Deelfontein with the chaos of the RAMC hospitals, where an enteric epidemic had overwhelmed the staff, led to questions in Parliament, mainly by William Burdett-Coutts. In July 1901 the first meeting of the Committee of Reform took place, with all the aforementioned civilian experts, plus Sir Edwin Cooper Perry, making up half the number; the rest were Army men, and included Alfred Keogh, whom the new Secretary of State for War, St John Brodrick, later Earl of Midleton, appointed Chairman of this committee and the subsequent Advisory Committee. Neither would have met so soon—if at all—but for Fripp's concern to limit unnecessary suffering, and for his ten years' friendship with the new King, Edward VII. Fripp showed him his plans for reform and the King made sure that they were not shelved by his government. Part of his plan was to move the Netley Hospital and Medical School to a Thames-side site at Millbank, London. Cooper Perry, Fripp's colleague from Guy's Hospital, was instrumental in making this happen, as well as using his formidable talents as an organizer in other services for the Reform Committee. Fripp and Cooper Perry were knighted for their services to the RAMC Committee of Reform in 1903.

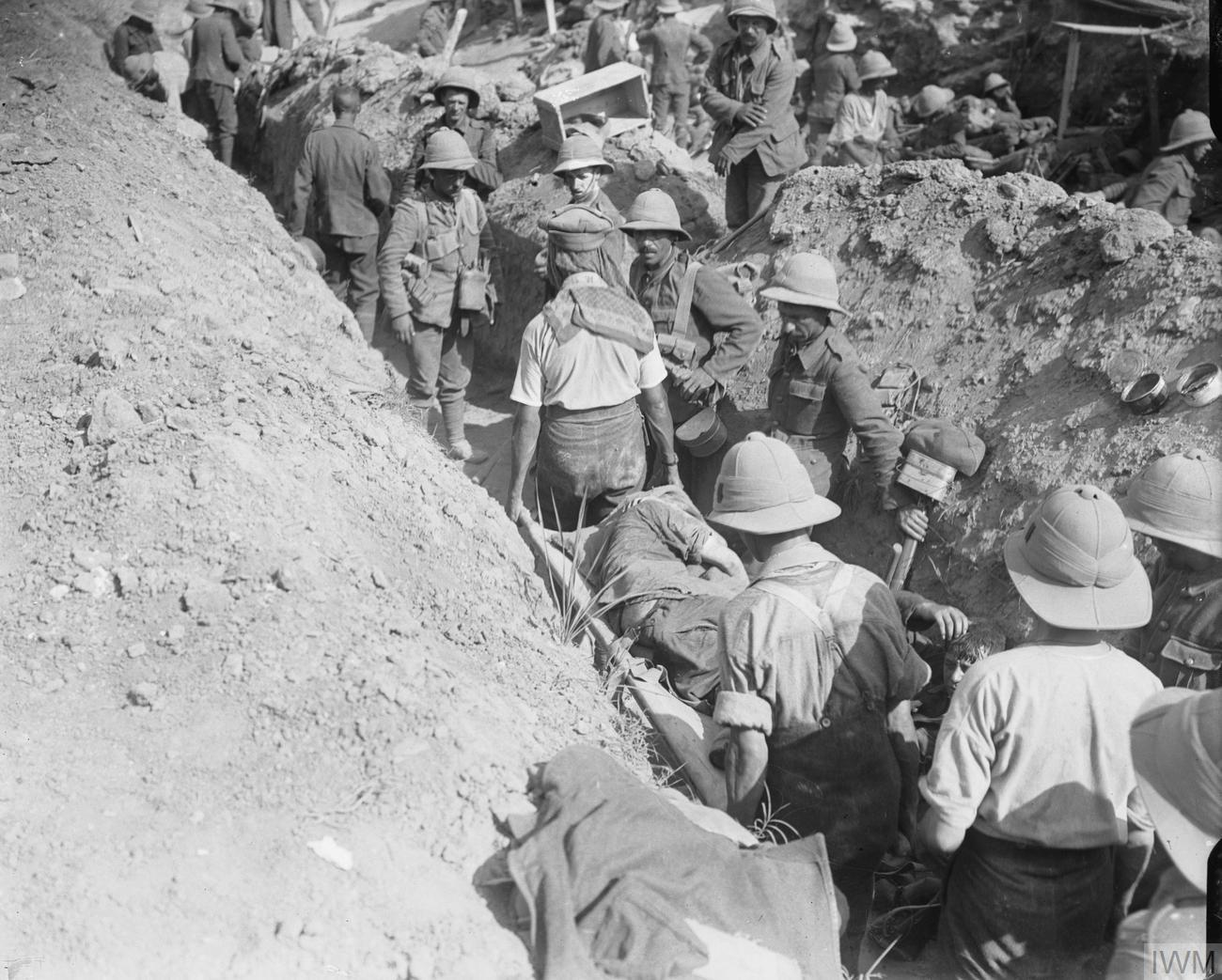
RAMC stretcher bearers carrying a wounded soldier through a trench at Cape Helles during the Gallipoli campaign, 7 August 1915

During the First World War, the corps reached its apogee both in size and experience. The two people in charge of the RAMC in the Great War were Arthur Sloggett, the senior RAMC officer seconded to the IYH in Deelfontein who acquiesced in all Fripp's surprising innovations, and Alfred Keogh, whom Fripp recommended to Brodrick as an RAMC man well-regarded when Registrar of No.3 General Hospital in Cape Town. Its main base was for long the Queen Alexandra Military Hospital at Millbank, London (now closed). It set up a network of military general hospitals around the United Kingdom and established clinics and hospitals in countries where there were British troops. Major-General Sir William Macpherson of the RAMC wrote the official Medical History of the War (HMSO 1922).

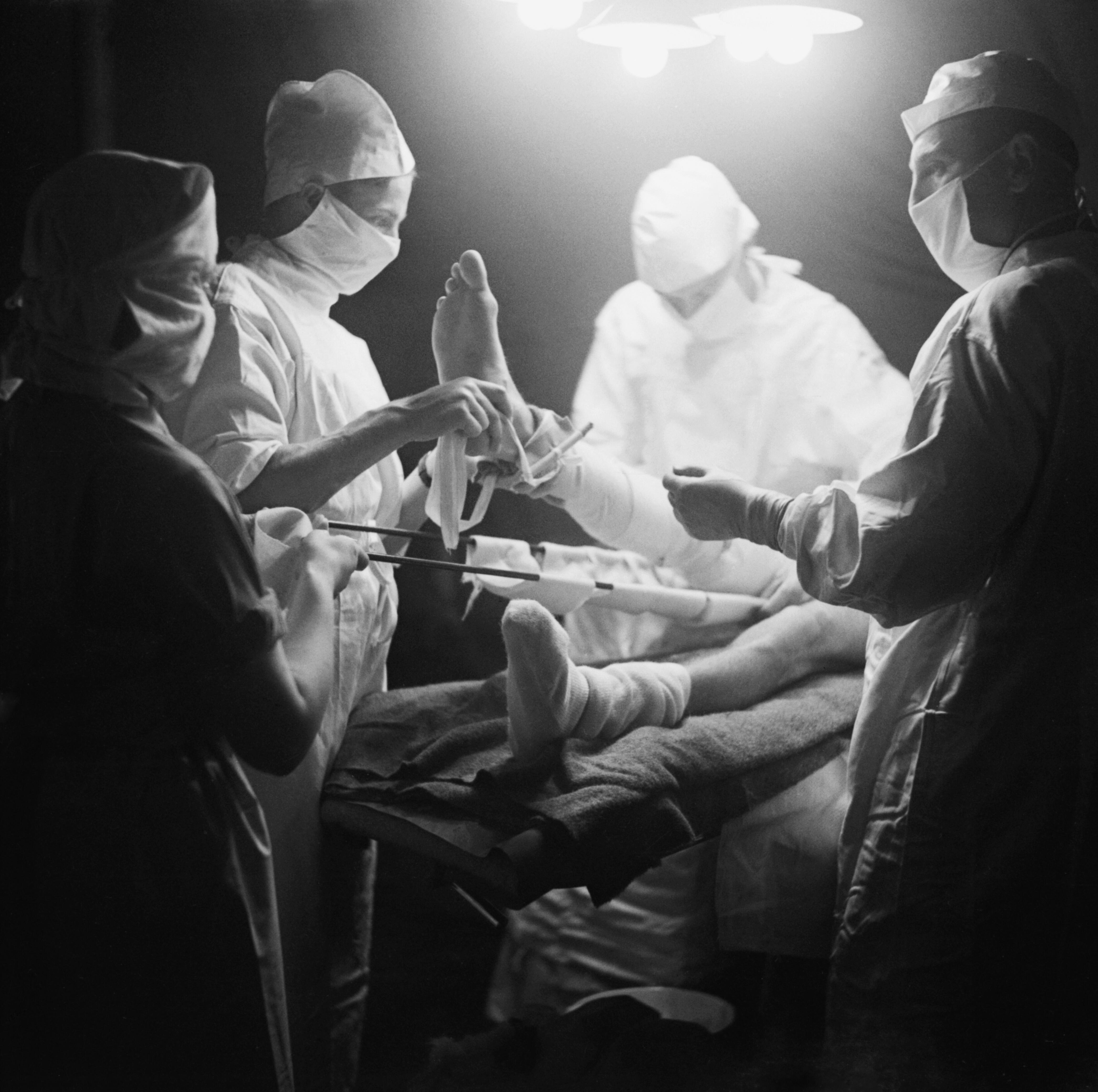
Army surgeons carry out an operation during the Second World War

Before the Second World War, RAMC recruits were required to be at least 5 feet 2 inches (1.57 m) tall, and could enlist up to 30 years of age. They initially enlisted for seven years with the colours, and a further five years with the reserve, or three years and nine years. They trained for six months at the RAMC Depot, Queen Elizabeth Barracks, Church Crookham, before proceeding to specialist trade training. The RAMC Depot moved from Church Crookham to Keogh Barracks in Mytchett in 1964.

=== Amalgamation ===
The Secretary of State for Defence, John Healey, announced on 15 October 2024 that the Government would amalgamate the Royal Army Dental Corps and Queen Alexandra's Royal Army Nursing Corps with the RAMC to form one unified corps, the Royal Army Medical Service (RAMS), on 15 November 2024.

== RAMC General Hospitals in the First World War ==
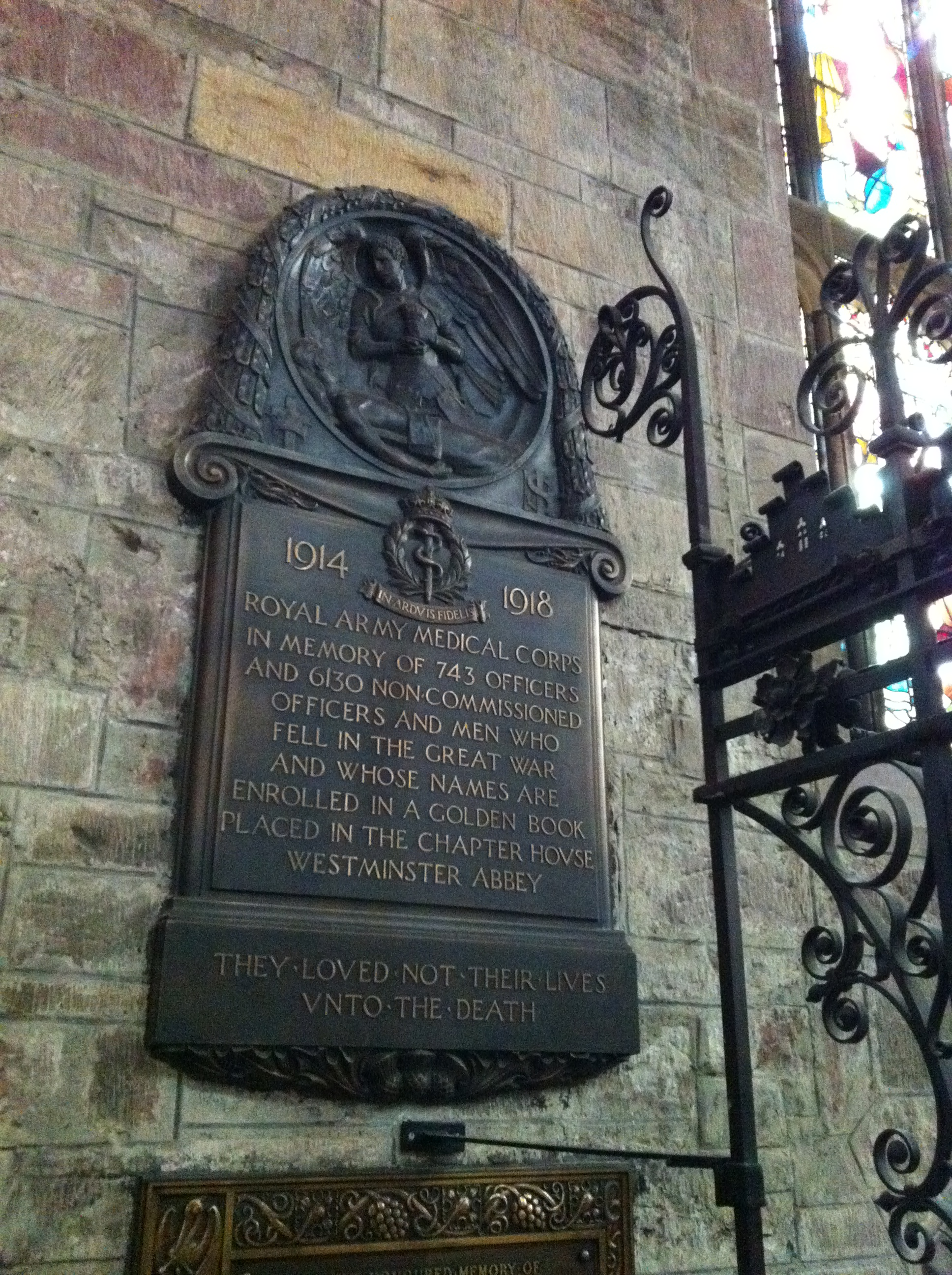
RAMC First World War memorial in St Giles Cathedral, Edinburgh

The corps established a network of home-country military hospitals for military casualties during the First World War. The hospitals were managed by Territorial Force personnel and were headquartered as follows:

London Command

- 1st London General Hospital: St Gabriel's College, Lambeth
- 2nd London General Hospital: St Mark's College, Chelsea
- 3rd London General Hospital: Royal Victoria Patriotic Building
- 4th London General Hospital: King's College Hospital
- 5th London General Hospital: St Thomas' Hospital

Eastern Command

- 1st Eastern General Hospital: on former Cambridge University cricket field
- 2nd Eastern General Hospital: Brighton Grammar School

Northern Command

- 1st Northern General Hospital: Armstrong College, Newcastle upon Tyne
- 2nd Northern General Hospital: Leeds Pupil Teacher College
- 3rd Northern General Hospital: City of Sheffield Training College
- 4th Northern General Hospital: Lincoln Christ's Hospital School
- 5th Northern General Hospital: Leicestershire and Rutland County Asylum Administration Building

Western Command

- 1st Western General Hospital: Fazakerley Hospital, Liverpool
- 2nd Western General Hospital: Central Higher Grade School, Manchester
- 3rd Western General Hospital: Cardiff Royal Infirmary

Southern Command

- 1st Southern General Hospital: The Aston Webb Building, University of Birmingham
- 2nd Southern General Hospital: Memorial Wing, Bristol Royal Infirmary together with Southmead Hospital
- 3rd Southern General Hospital: Oxford University Examination Schools together with Somerville College, Oxford
- 4th Southern General Hospital: Salisbury Road Schools, Plymouth
- 5th Southern General Hospital: Girls Secondary School, Fawcett Road, Portsmouth

Scottish Command

- 1st Scottish General Hospital: Aberdeen High School for Girls
- 2nd Scottish General Hospital: Craigleith Hospital and Poorhouse
- 3rd Scottish General Hospital: Stobhill Hospital, Glasgow
- 4th Scottish General Hospital: Stobhill Hospital, Glasgow

== Facilities ==
The military medical services are now a tri-service body, with the hospital facilities of Army, Royal Air Force and Royal Navy combined. The main hospital facility is now the Royal Centre for Defence Medicine at Queen Elizabeth Hospital Birmingham, a joint military-National Health Service centre. The majority of injured service personnel were treated in Selly Oak Hospital in Birmingham prior to the new Queen Elizabeth Hospital's opening. There was press coverage critical of the standard of care during the surge of UK military commitments in the years following the second invasion of Iraq, but it was later reported that the care provided to injured troops had significantly improved.

Queen Alexandra Hospital in Portsmouth, Derriford Hospital in Plymouth, James Cook University Hospital in Middlesbrough and Frimley Park Hospital (near Aldershot Garrison) also have military hospital units attached to them but they do not treat operational casualties.

== Sub-units at amalgamation ==
- 21 Multi-Role Medical Regiment
- 22 Multi-Role Medical Regiment
- 202 (Midlands) Multi-Role Medical Regiment
- 203 (Welsh) Multi-Role Medical Regiment
- 206 (North West) Multi-Role Medical Regiment
- 210 (North Irish) Multi-Role Medical Regiment
- 214 (North East) Multi-Role Medical Regiment
- 215 (Scottish) Multi-Role Medical Regiment
- 243 (Wessex) Multi-Role Medical Regiment
- 254 (East of England) Multi-Role Medical Regiment
- 256 (City of London and South East) Multi-Role Medical Regiment
- 1 Medical Regiment
- 2 Medical Regiment
- 3 Medical Regiment
- 16 Medical Regiment
- 306 Hospital Support Regiment
- 335 Medical Evacuation Regiment
- Medical Operational Support Group

== Insignia ==
The RAMC had its own distinctive insignia:

- Dark blue beret, the default Army colour worn by units without distinctive coloured berets. The exceptions were members of 16 Medical Regiment, who wore the maroon beret, 225 Scottish General Support Medical Regiment (previously Field Ambulance) and members of 205 (Scottish) Field Hospital, who wore the traditional Scottish Tam o' Shanter headdress with Corps badge on tartan backing, and medical personnel attached to field units with distinctive coloured berets, who usually wore the beret of that unit (e.g. maroon for The Parachute Regiment and sky blue for the Army Air Corps). There was also a small attachment to Special Forces, the Medical Support Unit (MSU), who wore the sandy beret of the SAS.
- Cap badge depicting the Rod of Asclepius, surmounted by a crown, enclosed within a laurel wreath, with the regimental motto In Arduis Fidelis ("Faithful in Adversity") in a scroll beneath. The cap badge was worn 1 inch above the left eye on the beret. The cap badge of soldiers beneath the rank of Warrant Officer 1 must have also been backed by an oval patch of dull cherry-red coloured cloth measuring 3.81 cm (1.5 inches) wide and 6.35 cm (2.5 inches) high sewn directly to the beret.

== Colonels-in-Chief ==
Colonels-in-Chief were:

- (1919–1942): Field Marshal HRH The Duke of Connaught and Strathearn KG KT KP GCB GCSI GCMG GCIE GCVO GBE GCStJ VD TD PC
- (1942–1953) HM Queen Mary LG GCSI VA CI GCVO GBE GCStJ RRC CD
- (1953–2002) HM Queen Elizabeth The Queen Mother LG LT CI ONZ GCVO GBE CC RRC CD
- (2003–2024) Air Marshal HRH The Duke of Gloucester KG GCVO GCStJ SSI

== Order of precedence ==
Preceded by Royal Logistic Corps	Order of Precedence	Succeeded by Corps of Royal Electrical and Mechanical Engineers

== Officer ranks ==
Before 1873	1873–1879	1879–1891	1891–1898	From 1898
Inspector-General of Hospitals	Surgeon-General	Surgeon-General	Surgeon-Major-General	Surgeon-General
Deputy Inspector-General of Hospitals	Deputy Surgeon-General	Deputy Surgeon-General	Surgeon-Colonel	Colonel
Deputy Inspector-General of Hospitals	Deputy Surgeon-General	Brigade Surgeon	Brigade Surgeon-Lieutenant-Colonel	Lieutenant-Colonel
Surgeon-Major	Surgeon-Major	Surgeon-Major	Surgeon-Lieutenant-Colonel	Lieutenant-Colonel
Surgeon	Surgeon-Major	Surgeon-Major	Surgeon-Major	Major
Assistant Surgeon	Surgeon	Surgeon	Surgeon-Captain	Captain
Assistant Surgeon	Surgeon	Surgeon	Surgeon-Lieutenant	Lieutenant

== Gallantry awards ==
Since the Victoria Cross was instituted in 1856, there have been 27 Victoria Crosses and two bars awarded to army medical personnel. A bar, indicating a subsequent award of a second Victoria Cross, has only ever been awarded three times, two of them to medical officers. Twenty-three of these Victoria Crosses are on display in the Army Medical Services Museum. The corps also has one recipient of both the Victoria Cross and the Iron Cross. One officer was awarded the George Cross in the Second World War. A young member of the corps, Private Michelle Norris, became the first woman to be awarded the Military Cross following her actions in Iraq on 11 June 2006.

One VC is in existence that is not counted in any official records. In 1856, Queen Victoria laid a Victoria Cross beneath the foundation stone of the Royal Victoria Military Hospital, Netley. When the hospital was demolished in 1966, the VC, known as "The Netley VC", was retrieved and is now on display in the Army Medical Services Museum.

Name	Award	Awarded while serving with	Medal held by
Harold Ackroyd	VC	Royal Army Medical Corps att'd The Royal Berkshire Regiment	Lord Ashcroft Collection
William Allen	VC	Royal Army Medical Corps att'd Royal Field Artillery	Army Medical Services Museum
William Babtie	VC	Royal Army Medical Corps	AMS Museum
William Bradshaw	VC	90th Regiment (The Cameronians)	AMS Museum
Noel Chavasse	VC and Bar	Royal Army Medical Corps att'd The King's (Liverpool Regiment); Bar: same	Imperial War Museum
Thomas Crean	VC	1st Imperial Light Horse (Natal)	AMS Museum
Henry Douglas	VC	Royal Army Medical Corps	AMS Museum
Joseph Farmer	VC	Army Hospital Corps	AMS Museum
John Fox-Russell	VC	Royal Army Medical Corps att'd The Royal Welch Fusiliers	AMS Museum
John Green	VC	Royal Army Medical Corps att'd The Sherwood Foresters	AMS Museum
Thomas Hale	VC	7th Regiment (The Royal Fusiliers)	AMS Museum
Henry Harden	VC	Royal Army Medical Corps att'd 45 Royal Marine Commando	AMS Museum
Edmund Hartley	VC	Cape Mounted Riflemen, SA Forces	AMS Museum
Anthony Home	VC	90th Perthshire Light Infantry	AMS Museum
Edgar Inkson	VC	Royal Army Medical Corps att'd Royal Inniskilling Fusiliers	AMS Museum
Joseph Jee	VC	78th Regiment (The Seaforth Highlanders)	AMS Museum
Ferdinand Le Quesne	VC	Medical staff Corps	Jersey Museum
Owen Lloyd	VC	Army Medical Department	AMS Museum
George Maling	VC	Royal Army Medical Corps att'd The Rifle Brigade	AMS Museum
William Manley	VC; Iron Cross	Royal Regiment of Artillery; Awarded Iron Cross 1870	Private Collection
Arthur Martin-Leake	VC and Bar	VC: South African Constabulary; Bar: Royal Army Medical Corps	AMS Museum
Valentine Munbee McMaster	VC	Royal Army Medical Corps; Winning his VC during the relief of Lucknow, while serving with the 78th Highlanders	National War Museum of Scotland, Edinburgh
James Mouat	VC	6th Dragoons (Inniskilling)	AMS Museum
William Nickerson	VC	Royal Army Medical Corps	Privately held
Harry Ranken	VC	Royal Army Medical Corps att'd King's Royal Rifle Corps	AMS Museum
James Reynolds	VC	Army Medical Department	AMS Museum
John Sinton	VC	Indian Medical Service	AMS Museum
William Sylvester	VC	23rd Regiment (The Royal Welch Fusiliers)	AMS Museum

== Trades and careers in the 21st century ==
RAMC officer careers:

- Doctor (Medical Officer)
- Pharmacist
- Physiotherapist
- Environmental Health Officer
- Medical Support Officer
- Clinical Psychologist
- Technical Officer – Biomedical Scientist/Radiographer/Clinical Physiologist/Operating Department Practitioner

RAMC soldier trades:

- Clinical Physiologist
- Combat Medical Technician
- Registered Paramedic
- Operating Department Practitioner
- Pharmacy Technician
- Environmental Health Technician
- Biomedical Scientist
- Radiographer

=== Military abbreviations applicable to the Medical Corps ===
Within the military, Medical officers could occupy a number of roles that were dependent on experience, rank and location. Within military documentation, numerous abbreviations were used to identify these roles, of which the following are among the most common.

ADMS	Assistant Director Medical Services
CMT	Combat Medical Technician (Field Medic).
CMT-P	A Combat Medical Technician that is also a state-registered Paramedic. (The "P" can be replaced by the Class of the CMT. ex. CMT-3 being an untrained Combat Medical Technician.)
DADMS	Deputy Assistant Director of Medical Services
DCA	Defence Consultant Advisor (the lead clinician for each specialty)
DDGMS	Deputy Director General Medical Services
DDMS	Deputy Director Medical Services
DG	Director General (Medical Services)
DGAMS	Director General Army Medical Services
DGMS	Director General Medical Services
DMS	Director Medical Services
EMO	Embarkation Medical Officer
GDMO	General Duties Medical Officer (a junior army doctor attached to a field unit before commencing higher specialist training)
MCD	Military Clinical Director (a senior army Consultant)
MSO	Medical Support Officer (non-clinical administrative support role)
MO	Medical Officer
OMO	Orderly Medical Officer
PMO	Principal Medical Officer
RMO	Regimental Medical Officer (normally an army General Practitioner with additional training in Pre-Hospital Emergency Care and Occupational Medicine)
SMO	Senior Medical Officer (normally a senior army General Practitioner)

== Journal ==
Since 1903, the corps had published an academic journal titled the Journal of the Royal Army Medical Corps (JRAMC). Its stated aim was to "publish high quality research, reviews and case reports, as well as other invited articles, which pertain to the practice of military medicine in its broadest sense". Submissions were accepted from serving members of all ranks, as well as academics from outside the military. Initially a monthly publication, in 2015 it was being published quarterly by BMJ on behalf of the RAMC Association.

== Museum ==
The Museum of Military Medicine is based at Keogh Barracks in Mytchett in Surrey.

== Band ==
From 1898 to 1984, the RAMC maintained a staff band in its ranks. The earliest record of music in the RAMC was in the 1880s when a Corporal of the Medical Staff Corps was sent to Kneller Hall to be trained as a bugler. It was founded officially in 1898, with official permission for the band being given by the Duke of Connaught, first Colonel-in Chief of the RAMC. In 1902, the band had reached a stature to where it could take part in the Coronation Procession of King Edward VII. On 1 January 1939, the RAMC Band was taken over by the Army Council and was officially recognised as a state sponsored band. In 1962, Derek Waterhouse became the first official drum major to be appointed to the band. It was disbanded in 1984, being one of the first to go in the as a result of the restructuring of the Army. It is today retained in the Army Medical Services Band.

== Notable personnel ==
- Category:Royal Army Medical Corps officers
- Category:Royal Army Medical Corps soldiers

== See also ==
- Combat medic
- Indian Medical Service
- Army Medical Corps (India)
- Army Medical Corps (Pakistan)
- Royal Australian Army Medical Corps
- Royal Canadian Army Medical Corps
- Women's Hospital Corps
