= Future Soldier (British Army) =

British Army modernisation plans

Future Soldier is a reform of the British Army resulting from the Integrated Review of Security, Defence, Development and Foreign Policy ("Global Britain in a Competitive Age") published in March 2021. The aim of the reform is to create a more lethal, agile and expeditionary force, able to fight and win wars and to operate in the grey-zone between peace and war. Future Soldier was published on 25 November 2021 and deals with the organizational changes of the British Army, with changes to personnel and equipment set out in the Defence in a Competitive Age paper published on 22 March 2021.

The British Army will be reduced to 73,000 regular personnel by 2025. The reserves will be kept at the current level.

== Allied Rapid Reaction Corps ==
The Allied Rapid Reaction Corps (ARRC) is a high readiness corps-level command tasked to lead NATO’s Response Force.

- Allied Rapid Reaction Corps (ARRC), in Innsworth

=== 1st Signal Brigade ===
1st Signal Brigade provides communications elements to Allied Rapid Reaction Corps (ARRC), Permanent Joint Headquarters, Joint Helicopter Command (JHC), Joint Task Force HQ (JTFHQ), and other government departments.

- 1st Signal Brigade, in Innsworth
  - 10 Signal Regiment, Royal Corps of Signals, in Corsham (Communication and Information Support)
  - 16 Signal Regiment, Royal Corps of Signals, in Stafford (Sustainment Signals Support Regiment)
  - 22 Signal Regiment, Royal Corps of Signals, in Stafford (HQ ARRC Signal Regiment)
  - 30 Signal Regiment, Royal Corps of Signals, in Bramcote (JHC/JTFHQ Signals Regiment)
  - 32 Signal Regiment, Royal Corps of Signals, in Glasgow (Signal Regiment - Reserve)
  - 39 Signal Regiment, Royal Corps of Signals, in Bristol (Signal Regiment - Reserve)
  - Gurkha ARRC Support Battalion, in Innsworth (Logistics and Force Protection for HQ ARRC)
  - 299 Signal Squadron, Royal Corps of Signals, in Bletchley (Special Communications)

=== 104 Theatre Sustainment Brigade ===
104 Theatre Sustainment Brigade is a theatre logistic enabling formation that operates strategic and operational Lines of Communications.

- 104 Theatre Sustainment Brigade, in South Cerney
  - 9 Supply Regiment, Royal Logistic Corps, in Hullavington (Theatre Support Regiment)
  - 17 Port and Maritime Regiment, Royal Logistic Corps, in Marchwood (Port and Maritime Regiment)
  - 29 Postal Courier and Movement Regiment, Royal Logistic Corps, in South Cerney (Movement Control Regiment)
  - 9 Theatre Support Battalion, Royal Electrical and Mechanical Engineers, in Aldershot (Equipment Support; unit to be established by 2025)
  - 2 Operational Support Group, Royal Logistic Corps, in Grantham (Logistics Operational Support Group; moves to Cottesmore in 2025)
  - 152 Logistic Regiment, Royal Logistic Corps, in Belfast (Fuel Support Regiment - Reserve)
  - 162 Logistic Regiment, Royal Logistic Corps, in Nottingham (Movement Control and Communications Regiment - Reserve)
  - 165 Port and Maritime Regiment, Royal Logistic Corps, in Plymouth (Port and Maritime Regiment - Reserve)
  - 167 Regiment, Royal Logistic Corps, in Grantham (Catering Support Regiment - Reserve; moves to Cottesmore by 2027)

== Field Army ==
- Field Army, in Andover
  - 1st (UK) Division, in York
  - 3rd (UK) Division, in Bulford
  - 6th (UK) Division, in Upavon
  - Field Army Troops, in Andover

=== 1st (UK) Division ===
1st (United Kingdom) Division locations 2025

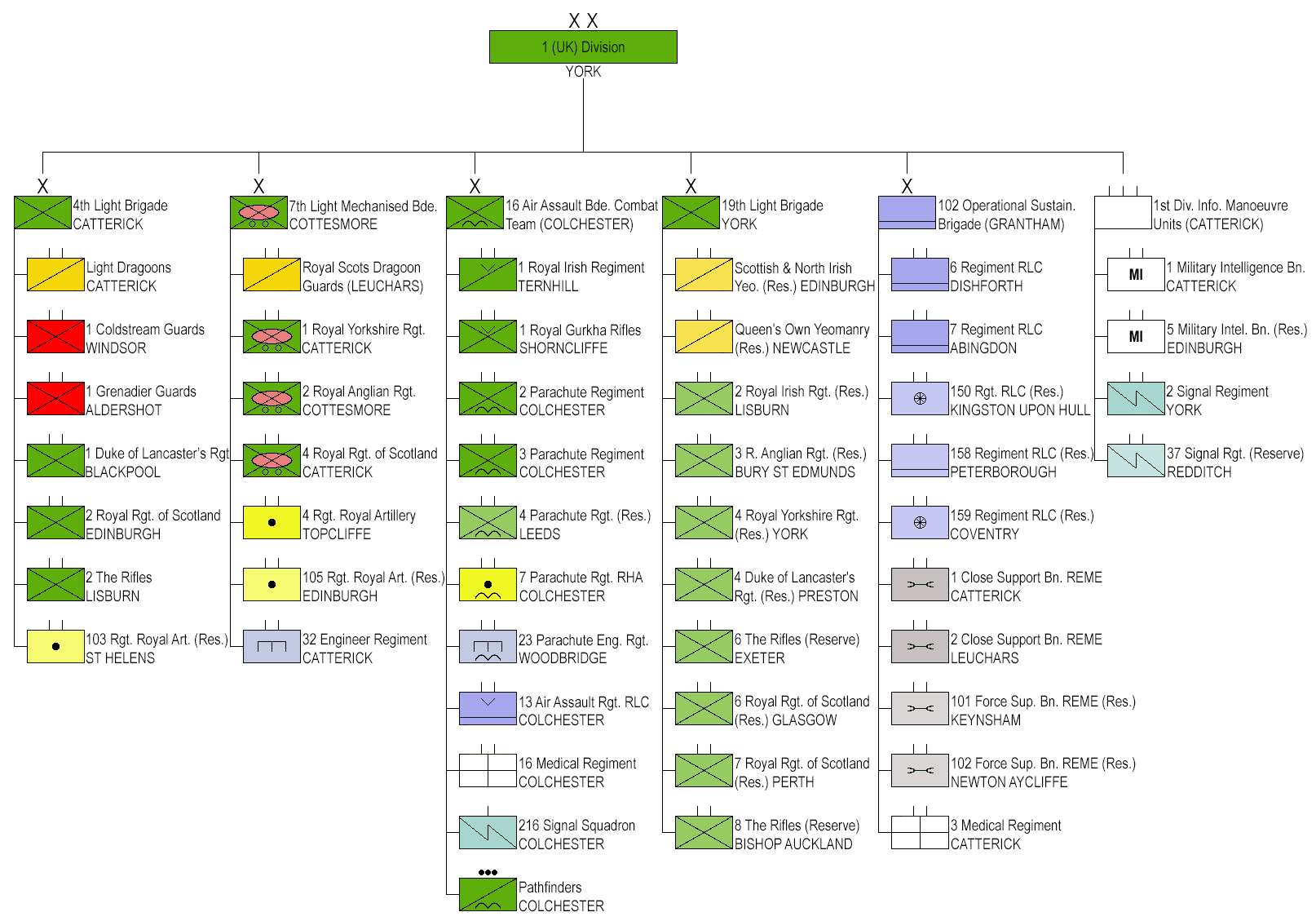
1st (UK) Division organization as of January 2026 (click to enlarge)

1st (UK) Division is the British Army's main contributor for land operations outside the Euro-Atlantic area and operations on NATO's flanks.

- 1st (UK) Division, in York (Moves to Catterick by 2028)

==== 4th Light Brigade ====
4th Light Brigade consists of Light Infantry formations.

- 4th Light Brigade, in Catterick
  - Light Dragoons, in Catterick (Light Cavalry)
  - 1st Battalion, Coldstream Guards, in Windsor (Light Infantry)
  - 1st Battalion, Grenadier Guards, in Aldershot (Light Infantry)
  - 1st Battalion, Duke of Lancaster's Regiment, in Cyprus (Light Infantry; moves to Blackpool in 2024)
  - 2nd Battalion, Royal Gurkha Rifles, in Folkestone (Light Infantry)
  - 2nd Battalion, Royal Regiment of Scotland, in Edinburgh (Light Infantry)
  - 2nd Battalion, The Rifles, in Lisburn (Light Infantry)
  - 103rd Regiment Royal Artillery, in St Helens (Close Support Light Artillery - Reserve)
  - 75 Engineer Regiment, Royal Engineers, in Warrington (Close Support Engineers - Reserve)
  - 154 (Scottish) Logistic Regiment, Royal Logistic Corps, in Dunfermline (Transport Regiment - Reserve)
  - 102 Battalion, Royal Electrical and Mechanical Engineers, in Newton Aycliffe (Close Support - Reserve)

==== 7th Light Mechanised Brigade ====
- 7th Light Mechanised Brigade, in Cottesmore
  - Royal Scots Dragoon Guards, in Leuchars (Light Cavalry)
  - 1st Battalion, Scots Guards, in Catterick (Light Mechanised Infantry)
  - 1st Battalion, Royal Yorkshire Regiment, in Catterick (Light Mechanised Infantry)
  - 1st Battalion, The Rifles, in Cyprus (Light Mechanised Infantry; moves to Chepstow in 2025)
  - 2nd Battalion, Royal Anglian Regiment, in Cottesmore (Light Mechanised Infantry)
  - 4th Battalion, Royal Regiment of Scotland, in Catterick (Light Mechanised Infantry)
  - 4th Regiment Royal Artillery, in Topcliffe (Close Support Light Artillery)
  - 105th Regiment Royal Artillery, in Edinburgh (Close Support Light Artillery - Reserve)
  - 32 Engineer Regiment, Royal Engineers, in Catterick (Close Support Engineers)
  - 6 Regiment, Royal Logistic Corps, in Dishforth (Close Support Logistics)
  - 3 Medical Regiment, Royal Army Medical Corps, in Catterick (Close Support Medical Regiment)
  - 1 Battalion, Royal Electrical and Mechanical Engineers, in Catterick (Close Support)

==== 16 Air Assault Brigade ====
- 16 Air Assault Brigade, in Colchester
  - 2nd Battalion, Parachute Regiment, in Colchester (Airborne Infantry)
  - 3rd Battalion, Parachute Regiment, in Colchester (Airborne Infantry)
  - 4th Battalion, Parachute Regiment, in Leeds (Airborne Infantry - Reserve)
  - 1st Battalion, Royal Irish Regiment, in Ternhill (Light Recce Strike Infantry; will move to Edinburgh by 2027)
  - 1st Battalion, Royal Gurkha Rifles, in Brunei (Air Assault Infantry)
  - 7th Parachute Regiment Royal Horse Artillery, in Colchester (Airborne Close Support Artillery)
  - 23 Parachute Engineer Regiment, Royal Engineers, in Woodbridge (Close Support Air Manoeuvre Engineers)
  - 13 Air Assault Regiment, Royal Logistic Corps, in Colchester (Air Assault Logistics)
  - 16 Medical Regiment, Royal Army Medical Corps, in Colchester (Air Manoeuvre Medical Regiment)
  - 216 Signal Squadron, Royal Corps of Signals, in Colchester (Communication and Information Support)
  - Pathfinders, in Colchester

==== 19th Light Brigade ====
- 19th Light Brigade, in York (Reactivated in 2022)
  - Scottish and North Irish Yeomanry, in Edinburgh (Light Cavalry - Reserve)
  - Queen's Own Yeomanry, in Newcastle upon Tyne (Light Cavalry - Reserve)
  - 2nd Battalion, Royal Irish Regiment, in Lisburn (Infantry - Reserve)
  - 3rd Battalion, Royal Anglian Regiment, in Bury St Edmunds (Infantry - Reserve)
  - 4th Battalion, Royal Yorkshire Regiment, in York (Infantry - Reserve)
  - 4th Battalion, Duke of Lancaster's Regiment, in Preston (Infantry - Reserve)
  - 6th Battalion, The Rifles, in Exeter (Infantry - Reserve)
  - 6th Battalion, Royal Regiment of Scotland, in Glasgow (Infantry - Reserve)
  - 7th Battalion, Royal Regiment of Scotland, in Perth (Infantry - Reserve)
  - 8th Battalion, The Rifles, in Bishop Auckland (Infantry - Reserve)

==== 8 Engineer Brigade ====
8 Engineer Brigade commands the army's two engineer specialist groups: 12 Group provides land and air force support engineering. 29 Group provides Explosive Ordnance Disposal, and Counter-Chemical Biological Radiological and Nuclear capabilities.

- 8 Engineer Brigade, in Minley
  - 12 Force Support Group, at RAF Wittering
    - 36 Regiment, Royal Engineers, in Maidstone (Force Support Engineers; moves to Cottesmore by 2028)
    - 39 Regiment, Royal Engineers, in Kinloss Barracks (Force Support (Air) Engineers)
    - 71 Regiment, Royal Engineers, in Leuchars (Force Support Engineers - Reserve)
    - 20 Works Group, Royal Engineers, at RAF Wittering (Specialist Air Infrastructure Support)
    - 62 Works Group, Royal Engineers, in Chilwell (Infrastructure Support; moves to Stafford in 2026)
    - 63 Works Group, Royal Engineers, in Chilwell (Infrastructure Support; moves to Stafford in 2026)
    - 65 Works Group, Royal Engineers, in Chilwell (Infrastructure Support - Reserve; moves to Stafford in 2026)
    - 66 Works Group, Royal Engineers, in Chilwell (Infrastructure Support; moves to Stafford in 2026)
  - 29 EOD & Search Group, in Aldershot
    - 11 EOD Regiment, Royal Logistic Corps, in Didcot (EOD and Search Regiment)
    - 28 Regiment, Royal Engineers, in Woodbridge (Counter CBRN)
    - 33 Regiment, Royal Engineers, in Wimbish (EOD and Search Regiment)
    - 35 Regiment, Royal Engineers, in Wimbish (EOD and Search Regiment)
    - 101 (City of London) Regiment, Royal Engineers, in Catford (EOD and Search Regiment - Reserve)
    - 1st Military Working Dog Regiment, in Cottesmore (Military working dogs)

==== 102 Operational Sustainment Brigade ====
102 Operational Sustainment Brigade moves troops and equipment to the battle area and logistically sustains fighting formations.

- 102 Operational Sustainment Brigade, in Grantham (Will move to York in 2024)
  - 7 Regiment, Royal Logistic Corps, in Abingdon (Force Logistic Regiment)
  - 150 Regiment, Royal Logistic Corps, in Kingston upon Hull (Transport Regiment - Reserve)
  - 158 Regiment, Royal Logistic Corps, in Peterborough (Aviation Support Regiment - Reserve)
  - 159 Regiment, Royal Logistic Corps, in Coventry (Supply & Transport Regiment - Reserve)
  - 2 Battalion, Royal Electrical and Mechanical Engineers, in Leuchars (Force Support)
  - 101 Battalion, Royal Electrical and Mechanical Engineers, in Keynsham (Force Support - Reserve)

==== 1st Divisional Integrated Effects Group ====
- 1st Divisional Integrated Effects Group, in Catterick
  - 1 Military Intelligence Battalion, Intelligence Corps, in Catterick (Military Intelligence)
  - 5 Military Intelligence Battalion, Intelligence Corps, in Edinburgh (Military Intelligence - Reserve)
  - 2 Signal Regiment, Royal Corps of Signals, in York (Communication and Information Support; will move to Catterick by 2028)
  - 37 Signal Regiment, Royal Corps of Signals, in Redditch (Signal Regiment - Reserve)

=== 3rd (UK) Division ===
3rd (United Kingdom) Division brigade locations 2025
At Bulford: 3rd (UK) Division 12th Armoured Brigade 20th Armoured Brigade 25 Engineer Group 7 Signals

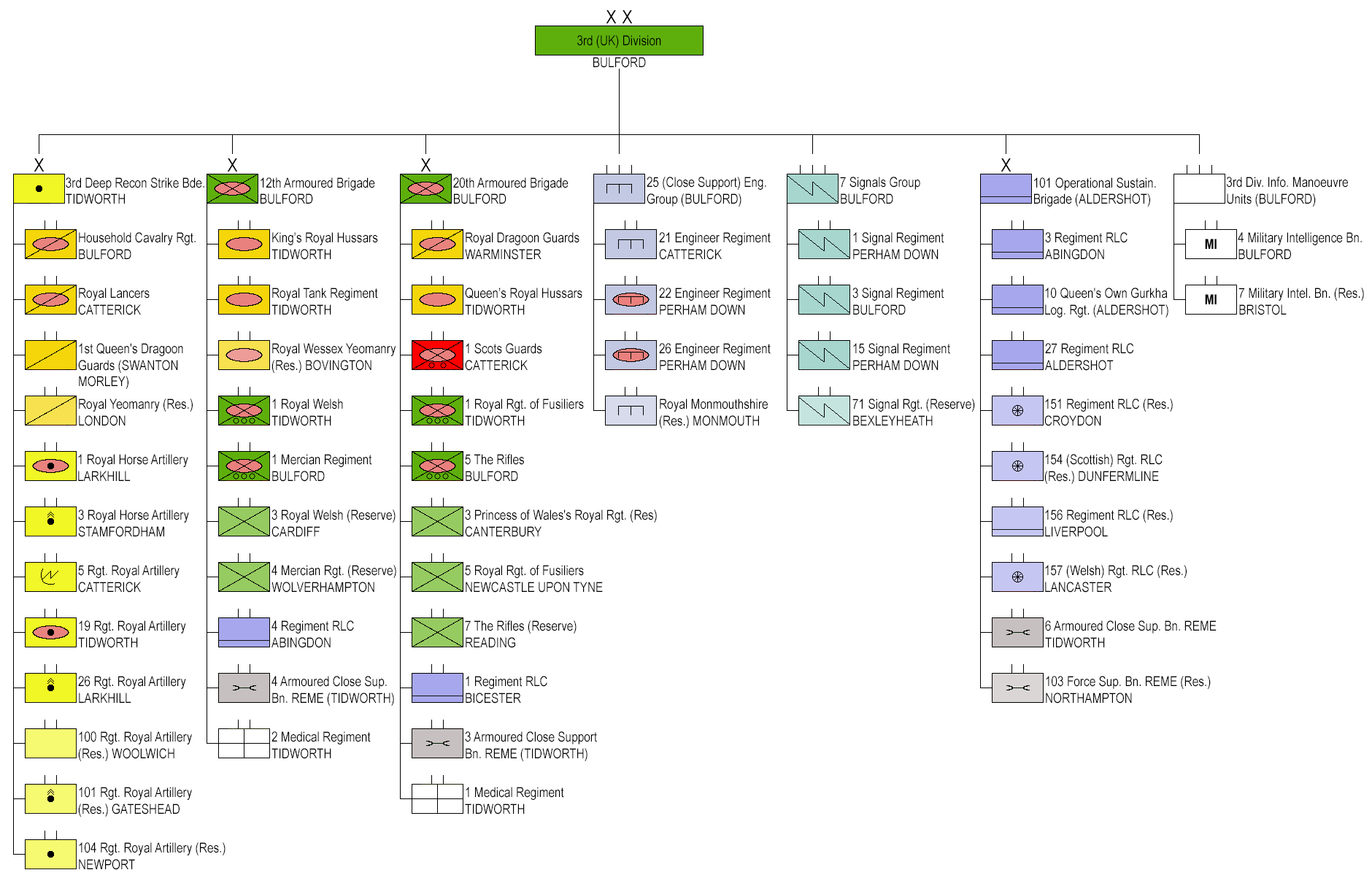
3rd (UK) Division organization as of January 2026 (click to enlarge)

- 3rd (UK) Division, in Bulford

==== 12th Armoured Brigade ====
- 12th Armoured Brigade, in Bulford
  - King's Royal Hussars, in Tidworth (Armoured Cavalry)
  - Royal Tank Regiment, in Tidworth (Armoured Regiment)
  - Royal Wessex Yeomanry, in Bovington (Armoured Regiment - Reserve)
  - 1st Battalion, Mercian Regiment, in Bulford (Mechanised Infantry)
  - 4th Battalion, Mercian Regiment, in Wolverhampton (Infantry - Reserve)
  - 1st Battalion, Royal Welsh, in Tidworth (Mechanised Infantry)
  - 3rd Battalion, Royal Welsh, in Cardiff (Infantry - Reserve)
  - 4 Regiment, Royal Logistic Corps, in Abingdon (Close Support Logistics; will move to Catterick in 2028)
  - 4 Battalion, Royal Electrical and Mechanical Engineers, in Tidworth (Armoured Close Support)
  - 2 Medical Regiment, Royal Army Medical Corps, in Tidworth (Close Support Medical Regiment)

==== 20th Armoured Brigade ====
- 20th Armoured Brigade, in Bulford
  - Royal Dragoon Guards, in Warminster (Armoured Cavalry)
  - Queen's Royal Hussars, in Tidworth (Armoured Regiment)
  - 1st Battalion, Princess of Wales's Royal Regiment, in Woolwich to Cyprus, then Bulford / Tidworth (Mechanised Infantry)
  - 3rd Battalion, Princess of Wales's Royal Regiment, in Canterbury (Infantry - Reserve)
  - 1st Battalion, Royal Regiment of Fusiliers, in Tidworth (Mechanised Infantry)
  - 5th Battalion, Royal Regiment of Fusiliers, in Alnwick (Infantry - Reserve)
  - 5th Battalion, The Rifles, in Bulford (Mechanised Infantry)
  - 7th Battalion, The Rifles, in Kensington (Infantry - Reserve)
  - 1 Regiment, Royal Logistic Corps, in Bicester (Close Support Logistics)
  - 3 Battalion, Royal Electrical and Mechanical Engineers, in Tidworth (Armoured Close Support)
  - 1 Medical Regiment, Royal Army Medical Corps, in Tidworth (Close Support Medical Regiment)

==== 3rd Deep Reconnaissance Strike Brigade ====
- 3rd Deep Reconnaissance Strike Brigade, in Tidworth
  - Household Cavalry Regiment, in Bulford (Armoured Cavalry)
  - Royal Lancers, in Catterick (Armoured Cavalry; will move to Tidworth in 2026)
  - 1st The Queen's Dragoon Guards, in Swanton Morley (Light Cavalry; will move to Caerwent by 2027)
  - Royal Yeomanry, in Leicester (Light Cavalry - Reserve)
  - 1st Regiment Royal Horse Artillery, in Larkhill (Armoured Close Support Artillery)
  - 3rd Regiment Royal Horse Artillery, Royal Horse Artillery, in Newcastle upon Tyne (Deep Fires)
  - 5th Regiment Royal Artillery, in Catterick (Surveillance and Target Acquisition)
  - 19th Regiment Royal Artillery, in Larkhill (Armoured Close Support Artillery)
  - 26th Regiment Royal Artillery, in Larkhill (Deep Fires)
  - 101st Regiment Royal Artillery, in Gateshead (Deep Fires - Reserve)
  - 104th Regiment Royal Artillery, in Newport (Close Support Artillery - Reserve)
  - 6 Armoured Close Support Battalion, Royal Electrical and Mechanical Engineers, in Tidworth (Close Support)

==== 7 Air Defence Group ====
- 7 Air Defence Group, in Thorney Island
  - 12th Regiment Royal Artillery, in Thorney Island (Short Range Air Defence)
  - 16th Regiment Royal Artillery, in Thorney Island (Medium Range Air Defence)
  - 106th Regiment Royal Artillery, in London (Air Defence - Reserve)

==== 25 (Close Support) Engineer Group ====
- 25 (Close Support) Engineer Group, in Bulford
  - 21 Engineer Regiment, Royal Engineers, in Ripon (Force Support Engineers; will move to Catterick in 2025)
  - 22 Engineer Regiment, Royal Engineers, in Perham Down (Close Support Engineers)
  - 26 Engineer Regiment, Royal Engineers, in Perham Down (Close Support Engineers)
  - Royal Monmouthshire Royal Engineers, in Monmouth (Engineers - Reserve)

==== 101 Operational Sustainment Brigade ====
- 101 Operational Sustainment Brigade, in Aldershot
  - 10 Queen's Own Gurkha Logistic Regiment, in Aldershot (Divisional Support Logistics)
  - 27 Regiment, Royal Logistic Corps, in Aldershot (Divisional Support Logistics)
  - 151 Regiment, Royal Logistic Corps, in Croydon (Transport Regiment - Reserve)
  - 156 Regiment, Royal Logistic Corps, in Liverpool (Supply Regiment - Reserve)
  - 157 (Welsh) Regiment, Royal Logistic Corps, in Cardiff (Transport Regiment - Reserve)
  - 5 Battalion, Royal Electrical and Mechanical Engineers, in Lyneham (Force Support)
  - 103 Battalion, Royal Electrical and Mechanical Engineers, in Northampton (Force Support - Reserve)

==== 7 Signals Group ====
- 7 Signals Group, in Bulford
  - 1 Signal Regiment, Royal Corps of Signals, in Perham Down (Communication and Information Support)
  - 3 Signal Regiment, Royal Corps of Signals, in Bulford (Communication and Information Support)
  - 15 Signal Regiment, Royal Corps of Signals, in Perham Down (Communication and Information Support)
  - 71 Signal Regiment, Royal Corps of Signals, in Bexley Heath (Signal Regiment - Reserve)

==== 3rd UK Divisional Integrated Effects Group ====
- 3rd UK Divisional Integrated Effects Group, in Bulford
  - 4 Military Intelligence Battalion, Intelligence Corps, in Bulford (Military Intelligence)
  - 7 Military Intelligence Battalion, Intelligence Corps, in Bristol (Military Intelligence - Reserve)

=== 6th (UK) Division ===
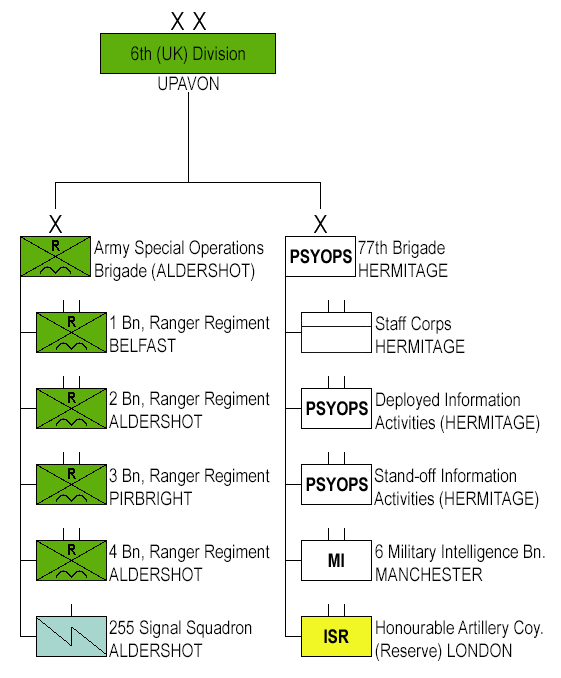
6th (UK) Division organization as of January 2026 (click to enlarge)

- 6th (UK) Division, in Upavon

==== Army Special Operations Brigade ====
- Army Special Operations Brigade, in Aldershot
  - 1st Battalion, Ranger Regiment, in Belfast (Army Rangers; former 1st Battalion, Royal Regiment of Scotland)
  - 2nd Battalion, Ranger Regiment, in Aldershot (Army Rangers; former 2nd Battalion, Princess of Wales's Royal Regiment)
  - 3rd Battalion, Ranger Regiment, in Pirbright (Army Rangers; former 2nd Battalion, Duke of Lancaster's Regiment; will move to Aldershot in 2027)
  - 4th Battalion, Ranger Regiment, in Aldershot (Army Rangers; former 4th Battalion, The Rifles)
  - 255 Signal Squadron, Royal Corps of Signals, in Perham Down (Communication and Information Support; will move to Aldershot in 2027)

==== 77th Brigade ====
- 77th Brigade, in Hermitage (Will move to Pirbright in 2026)
  - Staff Corps, in Hermitage (Capacity Building; will move to Pirbright in 2026)
  - Deployed Information Activities, in Hermitage (Deployed Information Activity; will move to Pirbright in 2026)
  - Stand-off Information Activities, in Hermitage (Stand-off Information Activity; will move to Pirbright in 2026)
  - 6 Military Intelligence Battalion, Intelligence Corps, in Manchester (Military Intelligence, hybrid active/reserve unit; will move to Pirbright by 2026)
  - Honourable Artillery Company, in London (Surveillance and Target Acquisition - Reserve)

=== Field Army Troops ===
Field Army Troops locations 2025

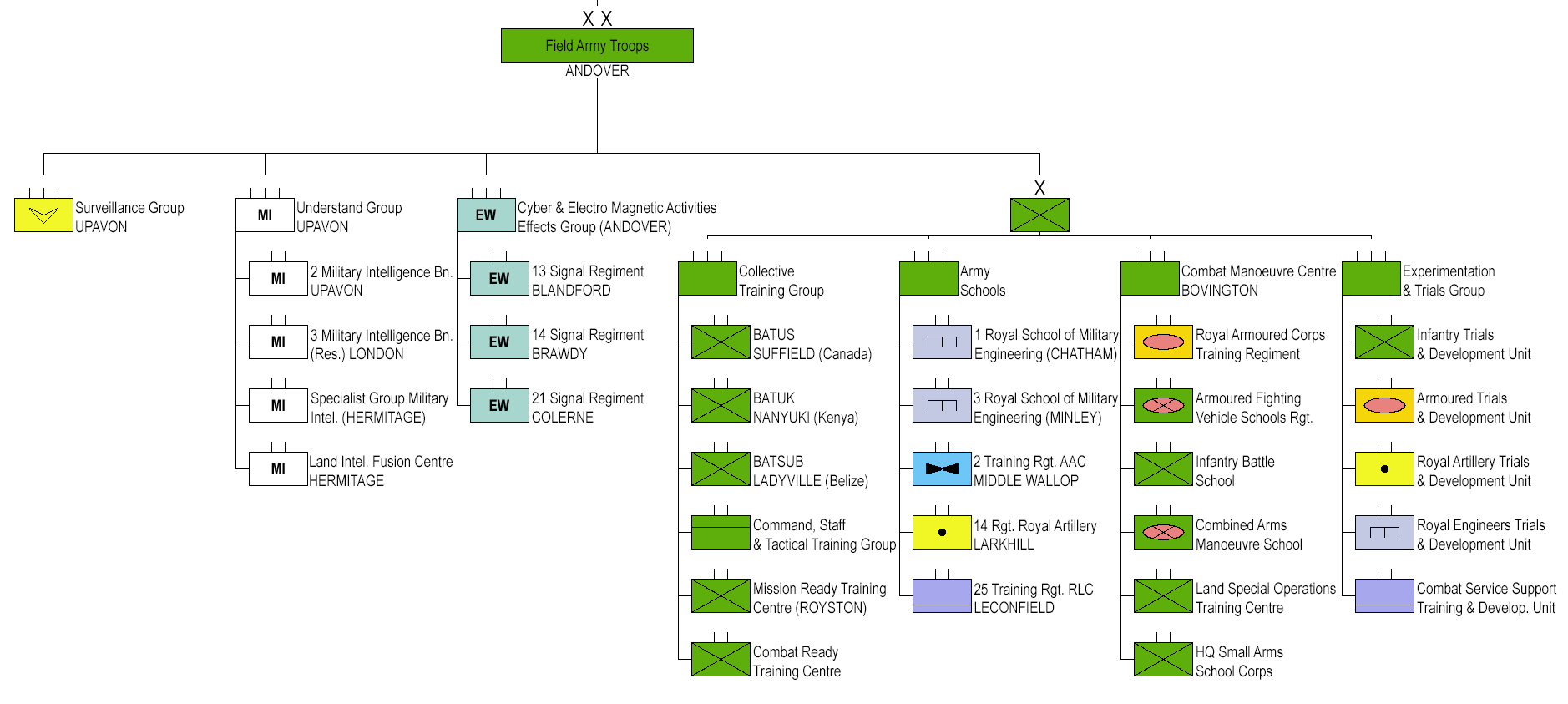
Field Army Troops organization as of January 2026 (click to enlarge)

- Field Army Troops, in Andover

==== 11th Brigade ====
- 11 Brigade (United Kingdom), in Aldershot

==== Intelligence, Surveillance and Reconnaissance Group ====
- Intelligence, Surveillance and Reconnaissance Group, in Upavon
  - 32nd Regiment Royal Artillery, in Larkhill (Miniature Un-crewed Aerial Systems: Puma and Wasp AE)
  - 47th Regiment Royal Artillery, in Larkhill (Tactical Un-crewed Aerial Systems: Watchkeeper WK450)
  - 2 Military Intelligence Battalion, Intelligence Corps, in Upavon (Intelligence Exploitation, hybrid active/reserve unit)
  - 3 Military Intelligence Battalion, Intelligence Corps, in London (Military Intelligence - Reserve)
  - Specialist Group Military Intelligence, in Hermitage (Military Intelligence - Reserve; will move to Aldershot by 2026)
  - Land Intelligence Fusion Centre, in Hermitage (Will move to Andover in 2027)

==== 2nd Medical Group ====
- 2nd Medical Group, in Strensall
  - 21 Multi-Role Medical Regiment, in Strensall (Restructured 34 Field Hospital)
  - 22 Multi-Role Medical Regiment, in Preston (Restructured 22 Field Hospital; will move to Strensall by 2026)
  - 202 (Midlands) Multi-Role Medical Regiment, in Birmingham (Reserve; restructured 202 Field Hospital)
  - 203 (Welsh) Multi-Role Medical Regiment, in Cardiff (Reserve; restructured 203 Field Hospital)
  - 206 (North-West) Multi-Role Medical Regiment, in Manchester and Liverpool (Reserve; merged and restructured 207 and 208 field hospitals)
  - 210 (North Irish) Multi-Role Medical Regiment, in Belfast (Reserve; merged and restructured 204 Field Hospital and 253 Medical Regiment)
  - 214 (North-East) Multi-Role Medical Regiment, in Newcastle upon Tyne and Sheffield (Reserve; merged and restructured 201 and 212 field hospitals)
  - 215 (Scottish) Multi-Role Medical Regiment, in Glasgow (Reserve; merged and restructured 205 Field Hospital and 225 Medical Regiment)
  - 243 (Wessex) Multi-Role Medical Regiment, in Keynsham (Reserve; restructured 243 Field Hospital)
  - 254 (East of England) Multi-Role Medical Regiment, in Cambridge (Reserve; restructured 254 Medical Regiment)
  - 256 (London and South-East) Multi-Role Medical Regiment, in Walworth (Reserve; restructured 256 Field Hospital)
  - 306 Hospital Support Regiment, in Strensall (Hospital Support Regiment - Reserve)
  - 335 Medical Evacuation Regiment, in Strensall (Medical Evacuation - Reserve)
  - Medical Operations Support Unit, in Strensall (Medical Operations Support Unit - Reserve)

==== Cyber and Electro Magnetic Activities Effects Group ====
- Cyber and Electro Magnetic Activities Effects Group, in Andover
  - 13 Signal Regiment, Royal Corps of Signals, in Blandford (Cyber; will move to Corsham by 2028)
  - 14 Signal Regiment, Royal Corps of Signals, in Brawdy (Electronic Warfare; will move to Innsworth by 2028)
  - 21 Signal Regiment, Royal Corps of Signals, in Colerne (Electronic Warfare; will move to Innsworth by 2028)

==== Land Warfare Centre ====
- Land Warfare Centre, in Warminster
  - Collective Training Group
    - British Army Training Unit Suffield (BATUS), in Suffield (Canada)
    - British Army Training Unit Kenya (BATUK), in Nanyuki (Kenya)
    - British Army Training and Support Unit Belize (BATSUB), in Ladyville (Belize)
    - Command, Staff and Tactical Training Group (CSTTG)
    - Mission Ready Training Centre (MRTC), in Royston
    - Combat Ready Training Centre
  - Army Schools
    - 1 Royal School of Military Engineering Regiment, in Chatham
    - 2 Training Regiment, Army Air Corps, at AAC Middle Wallop
    - 3 Royal School of Military Engineering Regiment, in Minley Manor
    - 14th Regiment Royal Artillery, in Larkhill
    - 25 Training Regiment, Royal Logistic Corps, in Leconfield
  - Experimentation and Trials Group
    - Infantry Trials and Development Unit (ITDU)
    - Armoured Trials and Development Unit (ATDU)
    - Royal Artillery Trials and Development Unit (RA TDU)
    - Royal Engineers Trials and Development Unit (RE TDU)
    - Combat Service Support Training and Development Unit (CSS TDU)
    - 2nd Battalion, Royal Yorkshire Regiment, in Catterick

== Home Command ==
- Home Command, in Aldershot
  - Army Personnel Centre (APC), in Glasgow
  - Army Personnel Services Group (APSG)
  - Arms and Services

=== Army Recruiting and Initial Training Command ===
- Army Recruiting and Initial Training Command (ARITC), in Upavon
  - Army Officer Selection Board (AOSB), in Westbury (Officer Selection)
  - Recruiting Group (RG), in Upavon (Recruit enlistment)
  - School of Infantry (SCHINF), in Catterick (Infantry training)
  - Initial Training Group (ITG), in Pirbright and Grantham (Phase One training)
  - Army Adventurous Training Group (Army) (ATG(A), in Upavon (Adventurous training)

=== Royal Military Academy Sandhurst Group ===
- Royal Military Academy Sandhurst Group, in Sandhurst
  - Royal Military Academy Sandhurst (RMAS)
  - University Officer Training Corps (UOTC)
  - General Staff Centre (GSC)
  - Centre for Army Leadership (CAL)

=== London District ===
- London District (LONDIST), in Westminster
  - Household Cavalry Mounted Regiment, at Hyde Park Barracks in Knightsbridge (Public Duties and State Ceremonial)
  - King's Troop Royal Horse Artillery, at Royal Artillery Barracks in Woolwich (Public Duties and State Ceremonial)
  - 1st Battalion, Welsh Guards, in Windsor (Light Infantry)
  - 1st Battalion, London Guards, in Battersea (Infantry - Reserve)
  - Public Duties Teams, at Wellington Barracks in London (Public Duties and State Ceremonial)
    - Nijmegen Company, Grenadier Guards
    - No. 7 Company, Coldstream Guards
    - F Company, Scots Guards
    - No. 9 Company, Irish Guards (Until 2027)
    - No. 12 Company, Irish Guards (Until 2027)
  - Household Division Bands
    - Mounted Band of the Household Cavalry
    - Band of the Grenadier Guards
    - Band of the Coldstream Guards
    - Band of the Scots Guards
    - Band of the Irish Guards
    - Band of the Welsh Guards
    - Countess of Wessex's String Orchestra
  - Regional Bands
    - Band of the Royal Regiment of Scotland
    - Band and Bugles of The Rifles
    - Band of the Brigade of Gurkhas
    - Prince of Wales Band
    - Catterick Band
    - Tidworth Band
    - Sandhurst Band

==== Regional Command ====
- Regional Command (RC), in Aldershot
  - Regional Point of Command (RPoC) South East, in Aldershot
  - Regional Point of Command South West, in Tidworth
  - Regional Point of Command North (Its exact location remains subject to further work.)
  - Regional Point of Command Centre, in Cottesmore
  - 38 (Irish) Brigade, in Lisburn
  - 51st Infantry Brigade and Headquarters Scotland, in Edinburgh
    - Balaklava Company, 5th Battalion, The Royal Regiment of Scotland, in Edinburgh
  - 160th (Welsh) Brigade, in Brecon

=== Joint Helicopter Command ===
- Joint Helicopter Command, in Andover
  - Army Aviation Centre, at AAC Middle Wallop
  - Watchkeeper Force HQ, at AAC Middle Wallop

==== 1st Aviation Brigade Combat Team ====
- 1st Aviation Brigade Combat Team, at AAC Middle Wallop
  - 1 Regiment, Army Air Corps, at RNAS Yeovilton (Aviation Reconnaissance)
  - 3 Regiment, Army Air Corps, at Wattisham Flying Station (Attack Aviation)
  - 4 Regiment, Army Air Corps, at Wattisham Flying Station (Attack Aviation)
  - 5 Regiment, Army Air Corps, at Aldergrove Flying Station (Aviation Reconnaissance)
  - 6 Regiment, Army Air Corps, in Bury St Edmunds (Aviation Support Regiment - Reserve)
  - 7 AS Battalion, Royal Electrical and Mechanical Engineers, at Wattisham Flying Station (Aviation Close Support)

== Provost Marshal (Army) ==
Provost Marshal (Army) polices the army and undertakes activities concerned with investigations, custodial matters and security in the UK. The 1st Royal Military Police Group provides police support to the force at an operational level, which includes operational detention, and support to security and stability policing.

- Provost Marshal (Army), in Andover

=== 1st Royal Military Police Group ===
- 1st Royal Military Police Group, in Andover
  - 1 Regiment, Royal Military Police, in Catterick (Military Police, hybrid active/reserve unit)
  - 3 Regiment, Royal Military Police, in Bulford (Military Police, hybrid active/reserve unit)
  - Defence Serious Crimes Unit, in Southwick Park (DSCU)
  - Special Operations Unit, in Southwick Park (Specialist Operations)
  - Military Provost Staff Corps, in Colchester (Military Police)

== Army units in other parts of Defence ==
Army units assigned to other parts of Defence:

=== Navy Command ===
- 3 Commando Brigade, in Plymouth
  - 29th Commando Regiment Royal Artillery, Royal Artillery, in Plymouth (Commando Artillery)
  - 24 Commando Royal Engineers, in Chivenor (Commando Engineers)

=== Air Command ===
- No. 22 Group, at RAF High Wycombe
  - 11 Signal Regiment, Royal Corps of Signals, in Blandford (Defence School of Communications and Information Systems)
  - 8 Training Battalion, Royal Electrical and Mechanical Engineers, in Lyneham (REME Training Battalion)

=== UK Strategic Command ===
- Defence Intelligence, in London
  - 42 Engineer Regiment (Geographic), Royal Engineers, at RAF Wyton (Geographical Support)
- Director Overseas Basing, in London
  - Royal Gibraltar Regiment, in Gibraltar (Light Infantry)

== Graphic overview ==
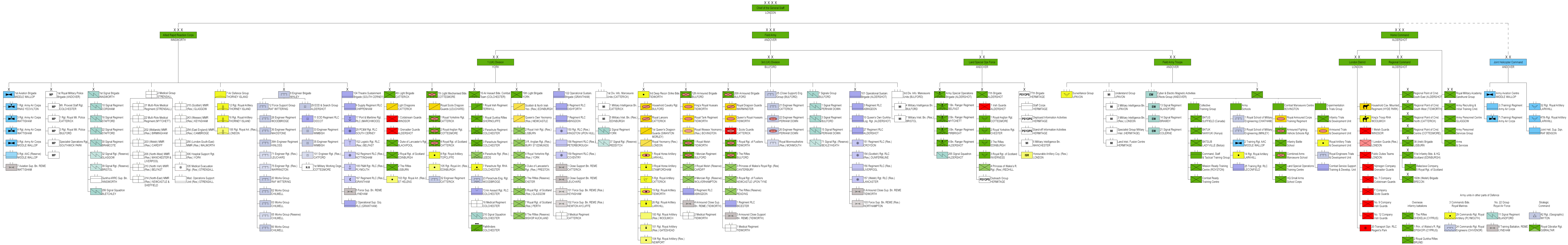
Organization of the British Army as of January 2026 (click to enlarge)

== Unit changes ==
The following are the units that will be raised, disbanded, amalgamated, re-designated, and re-roled under the reforms:

=== Units raised ===
- No 9 Company, Irish Guards
- No 12 Company, Irish Guards
- Coriano Company, Royal Gurkha Rifles
- Falklands Company, Royal Gurkha Rifles
- 9 Equipment Support Battalion, Royal Electrical and Mechanical Engineers

=== Disbandment ===
- 3 Medical Regiment
- 3 Regiment, Royal Logistic Corps

=== Amalgamations ===
Infantry

- 1st and 2nd Battalions of the Mercian Regiment, as the 1st Battalion.

Royal Army Medical Corps

- 207 (Manchester) Field Hospital and 208 (Liverpool) Field Hospital to form 206 (North West) Multi-Role Medical Regiment.
- 204 (North Irish) Field Hospital and 253 (North Irish) Medical Regiment to form 210 (North Irish) Multi-Role Medical Regiment.
- 201 (Northern) Field Hospital and 212 (Yorkshire) Field Hospital to form 214 (North East) Multi-Role Medical Regiment.
- 205 (Scottish) Field Hospital and 225 (Scottish) Medical Regiment to form 215 (Scottish) Multi-Role Medical Regiment.

=== Re-designations ===
Infantry

- London Regiment to become the London Guards.
- Royal Scots Borderers, 1st Battalion, Royal Regiment of Scotland to become 1st Battalion, Ranger Regiment.
- 2nd Battalion, Princess of Wales's Royal Regiment to become 2nd Battalion, Ranger Regiment.
- 2nd Battalion, Duke of Lancaster's Regiment to become 3rd Battalion, Ranger Regiment.
- 4th Battalion, The Rifles to become 4th Battalion, Ranger Regiment.
- 3rd Battalion, Royal Gurkha Rifles not formed, with personnel instead forming reinforcement companies for Ranger Regiment

Royal Army Medical Corps

- 22 Field Hospital to become 22 Multi-Role Medical Regiment.
- 34 Field Hospital to become 21 Multi-Role Medical Regiment.
- 202 (Midlands) Field Hospital to become 202 (Midlands) Multi-Role Medical Regiment.
- 203 (Welsh) Field Hospital to become 203 (Welsh) Multi-Role Medical Regiment.
- 243 (The Wessex) Field Hospital to become 243 (Wessex) Multi-Role Medical Regiment.
- 254 (East of England) Medical Regiment to become 254 (East of England) Multi-Role Medical Regiment.
- 256 (City of London) Field Hospital to become 256 (London and South East) Multi-Role Medical Regiment.

=== Re-role ===
Infantry

- 1st Battalion, Irish Guards from Light Role Infantry to Security Force Assistance.
- 1st Battalion, Royal Anglian Regiment from Light Role Infantry to Security Force Assistance.
- 3rd Battalion, The Rifles from Light Mechanised Infantry to Security Force Assistance.
- Black Watch, 3rd Battalion, Royal Regiment of Scotland from Light Mechanised Infantry to Security Force Assistance.
- 1st Battalion, Welsh Guards from Light Mechanised Infantry to Light Role Infantry.
- 1st Battalion, The Rifles from Light Role Infantry to Light Mechanised Infantry.
- 2nd Battalion, Royal Anglian Regiment from Light Role Infantry to Light Mechanised Infantry.
- 1st Battalion, Royal Yorkshire Regiment from Armoured Infantry to Light Mechanised Infantry.
- The Highlanders, 4th Battalion, Royal Regiment of Scotland from Armoured Infantry to Light Mechanised Infantry.
- 1st Battalion, Princess of Wales's Royal Regiment from Light Role Infantry to Mechanised Infantry.
