= 205 (Scottish) Field Hospital =

Medical corps in the British Army

205 (Scottish) General Hospital 205 (Scottish) Field Hospital
- Active: 1967 – 2023
- Country: United Kingdom
- Branch: British Army
- Role: Medical
- Size: Field Hospital; 204 personnel
- Part of: 2nd Medical Brigade
- Garrison/HQ: Glasgow

205 (Scottish) Field Hospital was a unit of the Royal Army Medical Corps within the Army Reserve of the British Army.

== History ==
The hospital was formed upon the formation of the TAVR in 1967, from the amalgamation of 5th (City of Glasgow) General Hospital, 50th (Scottish) Casualty Clearing Station, 155th (Lowland) Field Ambulance, and 157th (Lowland) Field Ambulance, as 205 (Scottish) General Hospital. Throughout the Cold War, the hospital was under 51st (Highland) Infantry Brigade; and on transfer to war, would re-subordinate to Commander Medical BAOR, to provide 800 beds to the 4th Garrison Area. During the reforms implemented after the Cold War, the hospital was re-designated as 205 (Scottish) Field Hospital. As a consequence of Army 2020, the unit fell under 2nd Medical Brigade, and was paired with 34 Field Hospital.

Under the Future Soldier programme, 205 (Scottish) Field Hospital amalgamated with 225th (Scottish) Medical Regiment to form the new 215th (Scottish) Multi-Role Medical Regiment in September 2023. The new regiment comes under 2nd Medical Group.

== Structure ==
The hospital's structure at disbandment was as follows:

- Headquarters, at Glasgow
- A Detachment, at Gordon Barracks, Aberdeen
- D Detachment, at Oliver Barracks, Dundee
- E Detachment, at Edinburgh
- G Detachment, at Glasgow
- I Detachment, at Inverness
