= Medical Support Officer =

The term Medical Support Officer is the name given to Commissioned Officers within the British Army's Royal Army Medical Service (RAMS).

== General background ==
The main role of the RAMS is to provide healthcare to the British Army in barracks and on operations, however leadership, command and control functions within the Corps are undertaken principally by Medical Support Officers. Professionally Qualified Officers (PQOs) within the RAMC, such as doctors, are in the Army to use their professional skills and as such are critical to the delivery of medical treatment. Leadership functions however rest with those officers who have gained a Commission either from attending the full Commissioning Course at the Royal Military Academy Sandhurst (RMAS), or outstanding soldiers Commissioning from the rank of Staff Sergeant who have attend the Late Entry Officers Course at the RMAS.

Commissioned officers within the RAMS who are professionally qualified are doctors, physiotherapists, pharmacists and environmental health officers. Although they pre-dominantly occupy clinical posts, they can assume senior non-clinical command roles such as Squadron Officer Commanding or Commanding Officer of a Regiment later in their careers should they complete the necessary Staff Officer qualifications.

== Role ==
The role of the Medical Support Officer (MSO) is to undertake the command and control leadership functions within the Royal Army Medical Service. They lead and motivate the troops under their command as well as leading higher ranking medical professionals. Wherever the Army deploys, medical planning is always at the top of the agenda.

MSOs will be required to deliver the Medical Recovery Plan for any possible casualties to the Commanding Officer and ensure they do not neglect medical constraints when delivering their own plans. This role requires a more mature approach to leadership and management than most other junior officer roles within the Army. An MSO in their first appointment may find themselves leading medical teams on the ground in places such as Canada, Kenya and Cyprus. Uppermost they are responsible for managing and leading Combat Medical Technicians who deliver the frontline medical support to the Army.

== See also ==
- Royal Army Medical Corps
- Royal Military Academy Sandhurst
