= 6 Armoured Close Support Battalion REME =

- Active: 1992–present
- Country: United Kingdom
- Branch: British Army
- Role: Equipment Support
- Size: Battalion; 410 personnel
- Part of: 3rd Deep Reconnaissance Strike Brigade
- Garrison/HQ: Delhi Barracks, Tidworth Camp
- Engagements: Operation Telic
- Website: 6 Armoured Close Support Battalion REME

6 Armoured Close Support Battalion REME is a battalion of the Royal Electrical and Mechanical Engineers of the British Army.

== History ==
The battalion was formed in 1992, at Bordon, from 3 Field Company, and 15 Field Company. Its initial role was to provide close equipment support to 3rd (United Kingdom) Division. One company deployed on Operation Telic 10 in 2007, just after the battalion moved to Tidworth Camp.

In September 2021, a platoon of 22 troops joined the 4th Armoured CS Battalion REME to provide public duties in London. This was the first time the corps has provided public duties for more than 30 years.

== Future Soldier ==
Under the Future Soldier reforms, the battalion is due to re-subordinate to the 3rd Deep Reconnaissance Strike Brigade after its formation.

== Structure ==
The battalion's current structure is as follows:

- 3 Armoured Company
- 13 Field Company
- 14 Armoured Company
