= 254 (East of England) Multi-Role Medical Regiment =

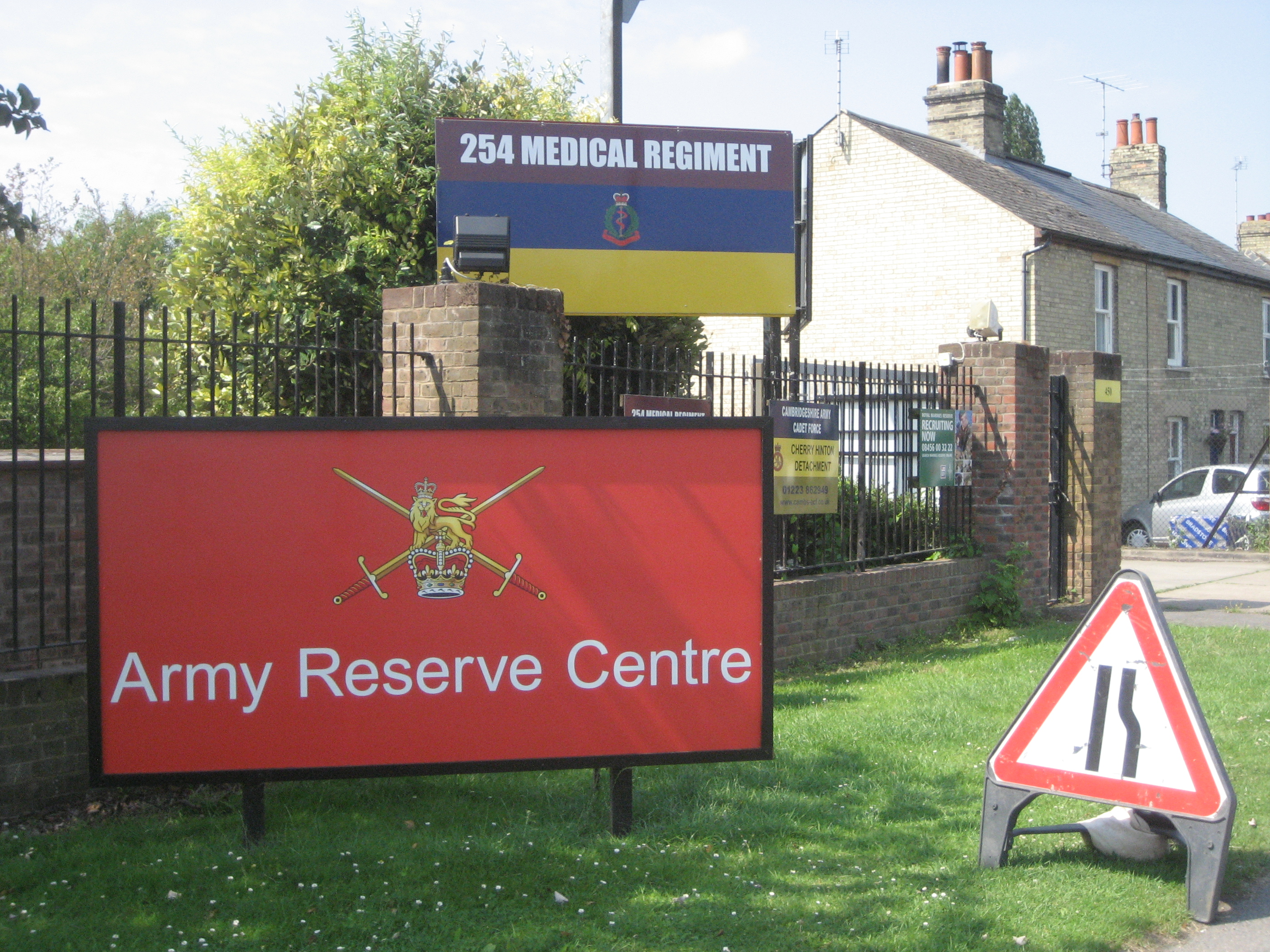
- Regimental Headquarters - Cambridge
- Active: 1983-Present
- Allegiance: United Kingdom
- Branch: British Army
- Type: Army Reserve
- Role: Medical
- Size: Regiment; 496 personnel
- Garrison/HQ: Cambridge

254 (East of England) Multi-Role Medical Regiment is an Army Reserve regiment of the British Army. The regiment is part of the Royal Army Medical Service and specialises in providing pre-hospital care.

== History ==
The regiment was formed in Cambridge in 1983 as 254th (City of Cambridge) Field Ambulance, RAMC (Volunteers). In 1999 it was re-organised with detachments at Norwich, Hitchin and Cambridge. It became 254 General Support Medical Regiment, RAMC (Volunteers) in 2006. By then it was based at Cherry Hinton and had detachments at Norwich, Hitchin and Colchester.

Under the Future Soldier programme, the regiment was redesignated as 254 (East of England) Multi-Role Medical Regiment. The regiment now comes under 2nd Medical Group.

== Role ==
The regiment's role is to train and provide officers and soldiers to support the Regular Army at home and abroad on military operations. The regiment specialises in providing pre-hospital medicine. The regiment recruits combat medical technicians, doctors, nurses, paramedics, drivers, chefs and military clerks from all walks of life and trains all individuals to the high standards required by the Army.

== Structure ==
The regiment consists of the following sub-units:

- Regimental Headquarters, at Cherry Hinton, Cambridge
  - 161 Medical Squadron
    - Colchester
    - Norwich Detachment
  - 162 Hospital Squadron
    - Hitchin
  - 163 Support Squadron
  - Cherry Hinton, Cambridge
