= Royal Army Dental Corps =

Dental arm of the British Army

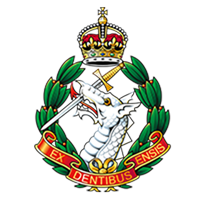
- Cap Badge of the Royal Army Dental Corps
- Active: 1921 – 15 November 2024
- Country: United Kingdom
- Branch: British Army
- Role: Dental support
- Size: 182 (2021)
- Part of: Army Medical Services
- HQ: Staff College, Camberley
- Mottos: Ex Dentibus Ensis (from the teeth a sword)
- March: Green Facings

Commanders
- Colonel Commandant: Colonel Quentin Anderson
- Colonel-in-Chief: Birgitte, Duchess of Gloucester

Insignia
- Tactical Recognition Flash

The Royal Army Dental Corps (RADC) was a specialist corps in the British Army that provided dental health services to British Army personnel and their families in war and in peace.

The corps was awarded the "royal" prefix to become the Royal Army Dental Corps in November 1946 in recognition of its service in the Second World War.

In November 2024, the corps was amalgamated with the Royal Army Medical Corps and Queen Alexandra's Royal Army Nursing Corps to form the Royal Army Medical Service.

== History ==
The Royal Army Dental Corps traces its roots back to the formation of the Army Dental Service (ADS) in 1901, during the Boer War. At that time, dental care for soldiers was limited, and the Army recognized the need for a dedicated dental corps to address oral health issues in the military. In 1899, there was no dental care provided for troops fighting in the Anglo-Boer War in South Africa. This resulted in more than 2,000 men being sent back home and 5,000 being classed as unfit for duty due to dental problems.

Following the war, in 1908, the ADS was disbanded, but the need for a specialized dental service remained apparent.

On 1 June 1921, the Army Dental Corps (ADC) was established as a permanent branch of the British Army. Its primary objective was to provide comprehensive dental care to the troops, ranging from preventive dentistry to emergency treatments. The ADC quickly expanded its operations and recruited qualified dental professionals to meet the growing demand for dental services within the military.

The Army Dental Corps had served around the world, in places like Germany, Gibraltar, Egypt, Iraq, Turkey, Burma, India, North China and the Caribbean.

In November 1946, King George VI granted the 'Royal' prefix to the Corps, in recognition of its service in the Second World War, and a new cap badge was designed depicting the legend of Cadmus.

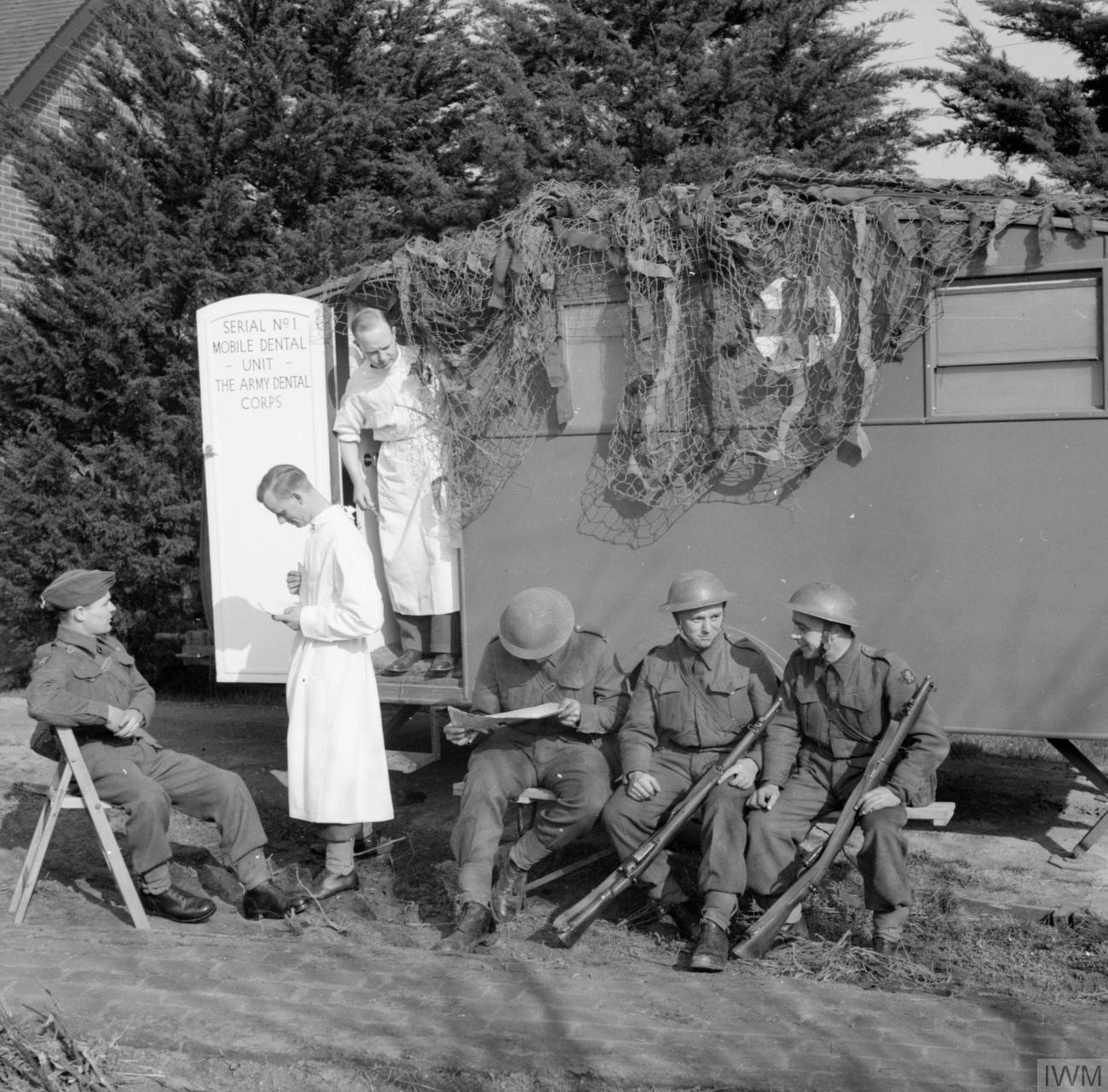
Soldiers wait for treatment outside a mobile unit of the Army Dental Corps, Canterbury, March 1941.

The Royal Army Dental Corps (RADC) has been involved in various wars and military operations throughout its history. Some of the major conflicts in which the RADC has played a role include:

- World War II (1939–1945): The RADC played a crucial role during World War II, ensuring dental care for British military personnel. Dental officers were deployed alongside the armed forces in various theaters, setting up dental facilities in military bases, camps, and field hospitals. They provided routine dental care, emergency treatments, and contributed to the evacuation and treatment of wounded soldiers. They also assisted with injuries and rehabilitation – particularly involving facial and head wounds that compromised the mouth and jaw.
- Korean War (1950–1953): The RADC was involved in the provision of dental services during the Korean War. Dental officers were deployed to support British troops serving in Korea, establishing dental clinics and providing necessary treatment and care, including routine checkups and cleanings, and dental emergencies caused by combat-related trauma or accidents.
- Malaya Emergency (1948–1960) Indonesia–Malaya Confrontation (1960–1966) Dental units serving all ranks and families in military camps, also in BMH both 'up country' and Singapore. During this period two RADC deaths are recorded.
- Falklands War (1982): During the conflict between the United Kingdom and Argentina over the Falkland Islands, the RADC played a significant role in providing dental care to British forces. Dental officers were deployed to the Falkland Islands and aboard Royal Navy ships, ensuring dental services for the troops involved in the conflict. A dental officer's combat role included acting as a resuscitation officer attached to a field hospital or a field ambulance.
- Gulf War (1990–1991): The RADC was actively involved in providing dental care during the Gulf War. Dental officers were deployed to the theater of operations, establishing dental facilities and offering dental treatments to military personnel involved in the conflict. RADC provided emergency dental care to soldiers who experienced dental injuries caused by combat-related injuries, accidents, or other dental traumas.

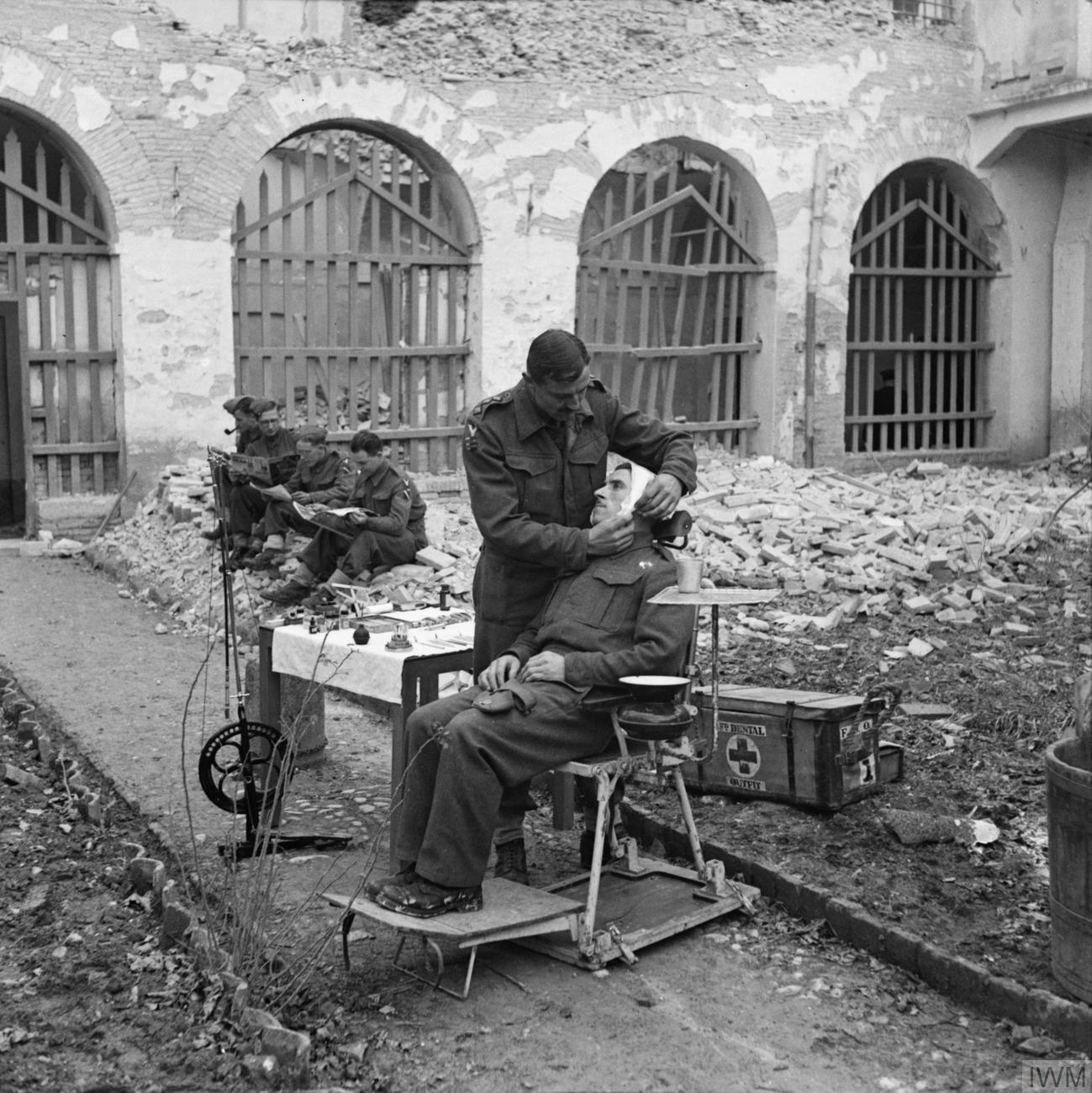
A British Army dentist at work on a patient in Italy, 1943

- Iraq War (2003–2011): The RADC played a crucial role in the dental care of British troops deployed to Iraq. Dental officers were stationed in military bases and field hospitals, providing dental services to soldiers in the theater of operations. RADC ensured that dental support was available to soldiers at forward operating bases (FOBs) and other military installations throughout Iraq. This involved deploying dental teams to FOBs and providing dental services in austere environments. RADC provided emergency dental care to soldiers who experienced dental injuries caused by combat-related injuries, accidents, or other dental traumas.
- Afghanistan War (2001–2014): During the conflict in Afghanistan, the RADC provided dental care to British military personnel deployed in the region. Dental officers were stationed in military bases and field hospitals, ensuring the oral health and well-being of the troops serving in the theater. Over 60 British military dental teams deployed as part of the UK Medical Group.

The RADC also played a vital role in humanitarian missions, providing dental care to local populations in regions affected by conflicts or natural disasters. The corps collaborated with international organizations and participated in multinational exercises.

=== Amalgamation ===
The Secretary of State for Defence announced on 15 October 2024, that the RADC (fewer than 200 personnel) would amalgamate on 15 November 2024, with the Royal Army Medical Corps and Queen Alexandra's Royal Army Nursing Corps to form one unified corps, the Royal Army Medical Service.

== Dental officer training ==
Becoming a dental officer in the Royal Army Dental Corps started with the completion of a Bachelor of Dental Surgery (BDS) degree from a recognized dental school.

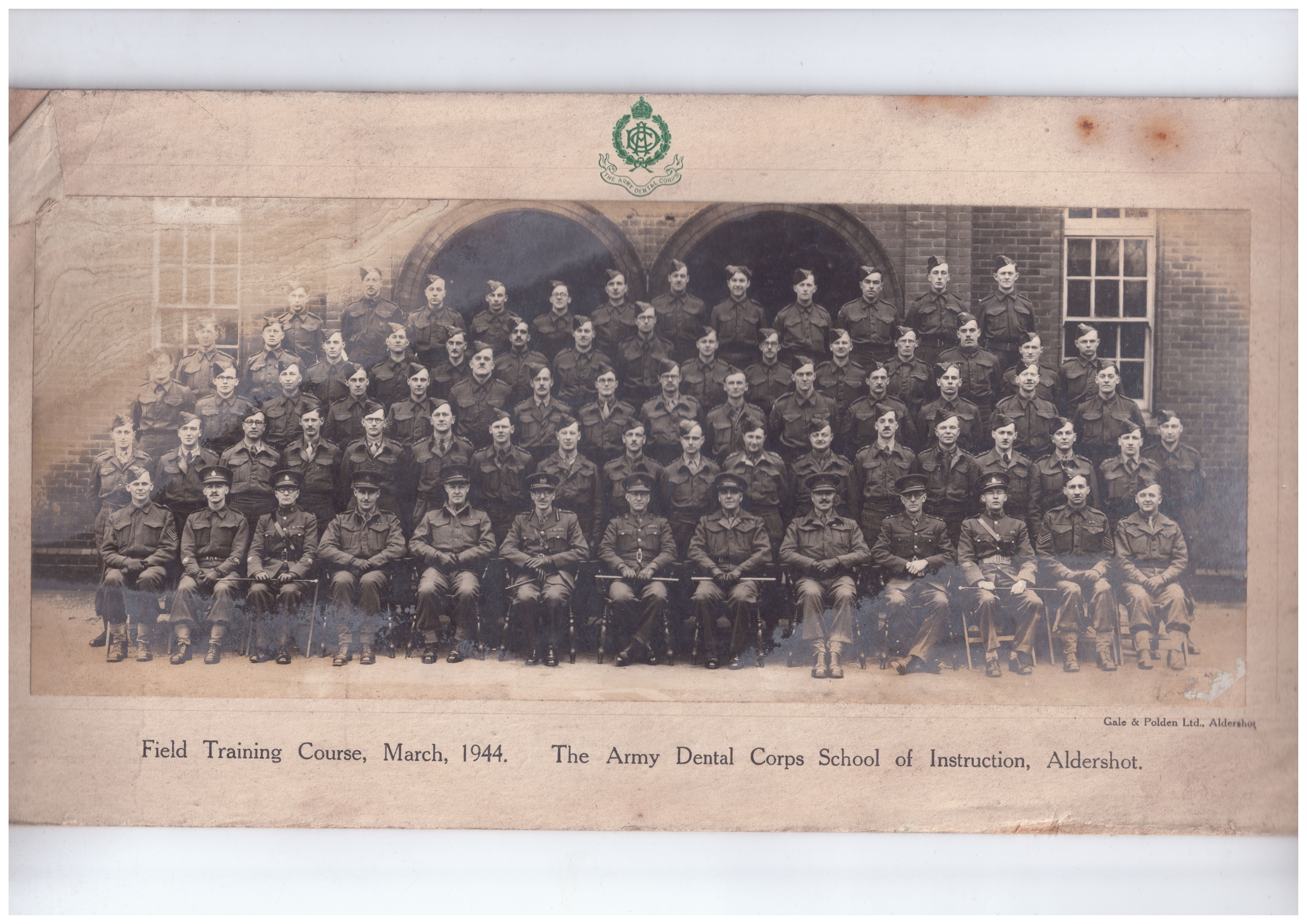
Field Training Course, March 1944, The Army Dental Corps School of Instruction, Aldershot

=== Joining the RADC ===
After completing their BDS degree, and registering with the General Dental Council (GDC), aspiring dental officers could apply to join the RADC. The Army Officer Selection (AOSB) is highly competitive and involves various assessments to evaluate the candidates' suitability for military service. This includes medical examinations, aptitude tests, interviews, and physical fitness assessments.

=== Basic Officer Training ===
Once selected, dental officers underwent the Commissioning Course Short at the Royal Military Academy Sandhurst. Dental officers were taught basic military, survival and weapon-handling skills. They learned about military regulations, customs, and the importance of teamwork. This training instilled the core values and ethos of the British Army which are designed to prepare them for military life. On completion of the course, they were commissioned into the Royal Army Dental Corps.

=== Specialized Military Dental Training ===
Dental officers would have attended the 14-week Army Medical Services Entry Officers' Course, which would provide them with the specific knowledge required to begin their career as an Army Dentist. During this, dental officers received advanced training in areas such as oral surgery, restorative dentistry, periodontics, endodontics, and prosthodontics. They would have learned to adapt their dental skills to the specific needs of soldiers, including trauma management, preventive dentistry in operational environments, and emergency dental care in the field.

=== Deployment and Continual Professional Development ===
Once dental officers completed their Entry Officers' Course, they were deployed to various military bases or operational areas. During deployments, they provided dental care to soldiers and ensure the maintenance of oral health, often in challenging conditions.

All Army Dentists used to gain postgraduate qualifications throughout their careers such as the Diploma of Membership of the Joint Dental Faculties (MJDF) at the Royal College of Surgeons England.

== Royal Army Dental Corps specialisations ==
Qualified dentists are all commissioned officers. Dental nurses are non-commissioned officers.

Before the Second World War, ADC recruits were required to be at least 5 feet 2 inches (157 cm) tall and could enlist up to 30 years of age. They initially enlisted for seven years with the colours and a further five years with the reserve. They trained at the Royal Army Medical Corps Depot, Crookham Camp, Aldershot, before proceedings to specialist trade training. The two trades available at that time were Clerk Orderly (who assisted in the operating room and in clerical work) and Dental Mechanic (who worked in dental workshops).

== In popular culture ==
The comedy team of Wayne and Shuster performed a sketch titled "Kwai Me a River" on their 27 March 1967 TV show, in which an officer in the Royal Army Dental Corps (Wayne) is captured by the Japanese and, despite being comically unintimidated by any abuse the commander of the POW camp (Shuster) inflicts on him, is forced to build a (dental) "bridge on the river Kwai" for the commander and plans to include an explosive in the appliance to detonate in his mouth. The commander survives the explosion, attributed to a toothpaste commercial punchline in 1960s commercials.

== Alliances ==
- Canada – Royal Canadian Dental Corps
- Australia – Royal Australian Army Dental Corps
- New Zealand – Royal New Zealand Dental Corps

== Order of precedence ==
Preceded by Small Arms School Corps	Order of Precedence	Succeeded by Intelligence Corps
