= 3 Armoured Close Support Battalion REME =

- Active: 1993–present
- Country: United Kingdom
- Branch: British Army
- Role: Equipment Support
- Size: Battalion; 406 personnel
- Part of: 20th Armoured Brigade Combat Team
- Garrison/HQ: Prince Philip Lines, Tidworth Camp
- Engagements: Bosnia; Kosovo; Operation Telic; Operation Herrick

3 Armoured Close Support Battalion REME is a battalion of the Royal Electrical and Mechanical Engineers of the British Army.

== History ==
The battalion was formed in 1993, from 4 Armoured Workshop, at Hobart Barracks in Detmold. Its initial role was to support 20th Armoured Brigade. Upon the disbandment of 1 (BR) Corps in 1994, the battalion gained 58 Station Workshop as 3 Garrison Workshop.

In September 2021, a platoon of 22 troops joined the 4th Armoured CS Battalion REME to provide public duties in London. This was the first time the corps has provided public duties for more than 30 years.

== Structure ==
The battalion's current structure is as follows:

- 5 Armoured Company
- 18 Field Company
- 20 Armoured Company
