= 3 Regiment RLC =

- Active: 1965 - 2023
- Country: United Kingdom
- Branch: British Army
- Type: Regiment
- Role: Close support logistics
- Size: Regiment; 545 personnel
- Part of: Royal Logistic Corps
- Garrison/HQ: Abingdon
- Motto: Fighting Through
- Engagements: Yugoslav Wars; War in Afghanistan
- Website: www.army.mod.uk/who-we-are/corps-regiments-and-units/royal-logistic-corps/rlc-regular-units/3-regiment-rlc/

Commanders
- Current commander: Lt Col SG Cooke

3 Regiment RLC was a regiment of the British Army's Royal Logistic Corps. It was disbanded as part of the Future Soldier reforms.

== History ==
The 3rd Regiment of the Royal Logistic Corps was originally formed as part of Royal Corps of Transport in 1965. The regiment was renamed 3rd Division Transport Regiment in 1970, 3rd Armoured Division Transport Regiment in 1977 and 3rd Regiment RLC in 1993.

The regiment most recently provided logistical support for 20 Armoured Infantry Brigade.

In October 2021 personnel from the regiment were deployed to Thurrock in Essex as part of Operation Escalin (arrangements to ensure continuity of a fuel supplies). The regiment provided fuel deliver drivers and trained with the logistics company Hoyers.

== Structure ==
The organisational structure of the regiment at disbandment was as follows:

- 35 Headquarters Squadron
- 21 General Support Squadron
- 31 Close Support Squadron
- 32 Close Support Squadron
