= 3rd Deep Recce Strike Brigade =

British Army formation

- Active: 2022–present day
- Country: United Kingdom
- Branch: British Army
- Size: Brigade
- Part of: 3rd (United Kingdom) Division
- Garrison/HQ: Delhi Barracks, Tidworth Camp

The 3rd Deep Recce Strike Brigade is a formation of the British Army, currently headquartered in Delhi Barracks, Tidworth Camp, Wiltshire and assigned to the 3rd (United Kingdom) Division.

== History ==
As part of the Future Soldier Programme, which in turn arose from resulting from the Integrated Review of Security, Defence, Development and Foreign Policy ("Global Britain in a Competitive Age") published in March 2021, it was announced that 1st Armoured Infantry Brigade and 1st Artillery Brigade would merge to form a deep fighting formation known as 1st Deep Reconnaissance Strike Brigade Combat Team. The Brigade was officially stood up on 1 July 2022. On 1 September 2025, the 1st Deep Recce Strike Brigade re-subordinated as the 3rd Deep Recce Strike Brigade.

The brigade is designed to integrate reconnaissance assets with deep fires and non-lethal effects, utilising Ajax and MLRS systems.

1st Deep Recce Strike BCT will focus on the Army’s deep fight, combining deep fires with reconnaissance and the ability to integrate non-lethal effects. Deep Recce Strike BCT combines the Ajax’s formidable sensors with enhanced fires systems to provide long-range persistent surveillance for the coordination of deep fires.

== Current organization ==
As of October 2025 the organization of the 3rd Deep Recce Strike Brigade is as follows:

- Brigade Headquarters. Delhi Barracks, Tidworth
  - Household Cavalry Regiment, at Powle Lines, Bulford Camp (Armoured Cavalry)
  - 1st The Queen's Dragoon Guards, at Robertson Barracks, Swanton Morley (Light Cavalry)
  - Royal Lancers (Queen Elizabeth's Own), at Catterick Garrison (Armoured Cavalry)
  - Royal Yeomanry, in Leicester (Light Cavalry)
  - 1st Regiment Royal Horse Artillery, at Assaye Barracks, Larkhill Garrison (Armoured Fires)
  - 3rd Regiment Royal Horse Artillery, at Albemarle Barracks, Stamfordham (Deep Fires)
  - 5th Regiment Royal Artillery, at Marne Barracks, Catterick Garrison (Surveillance & Target Acquisition)
  - 19th Regiment Royal Artillery, at Larkhill Garrison (Armoured Fires)
  - 26th Regiment Royal Artillery, at Purvis Lines, Larkhill Garrison (Deep Fires)
  - 100th (Yeomanry) Regiment Royal Artillery, at Royal Artillery Barracks, Woolwich
  - 101st (Northumbrian) Regiment Royal Artillery, at Napier Armoury, Gateshead (Deep Fires, will provide a formed battery to each of 3 RHA and 26 Regt RA)
  - 104th Regiment Royal Artillery, at Raglan Barracks, Newport (Armoured Fires, will provide individual reinforcements to 1 RHA and 19 Regt RA)
  - 6 Armoured Close Support Battalion, Royal Electrical and Mechanical Engineers, at Delhi Barracks, Tidworth Camp
  - 206 (North West) Multi-Role Medical Regiment, Royal Army Medical Corps
