= 1 Medical Regiment =

1 Close Support Medical Regiment 1 Medical Regiment
- Active: 1 April 2000–present
- Country: United Kingdom
- Branch: British Army
- Type: Royal Army Medical Service
- Size: Regiment
- Part of: 101st Operational Sustainment Brigade
- Garrison/HQ: Bhurtpore Barracks, Tidworth Camp
- Colors: Blue

Insignia
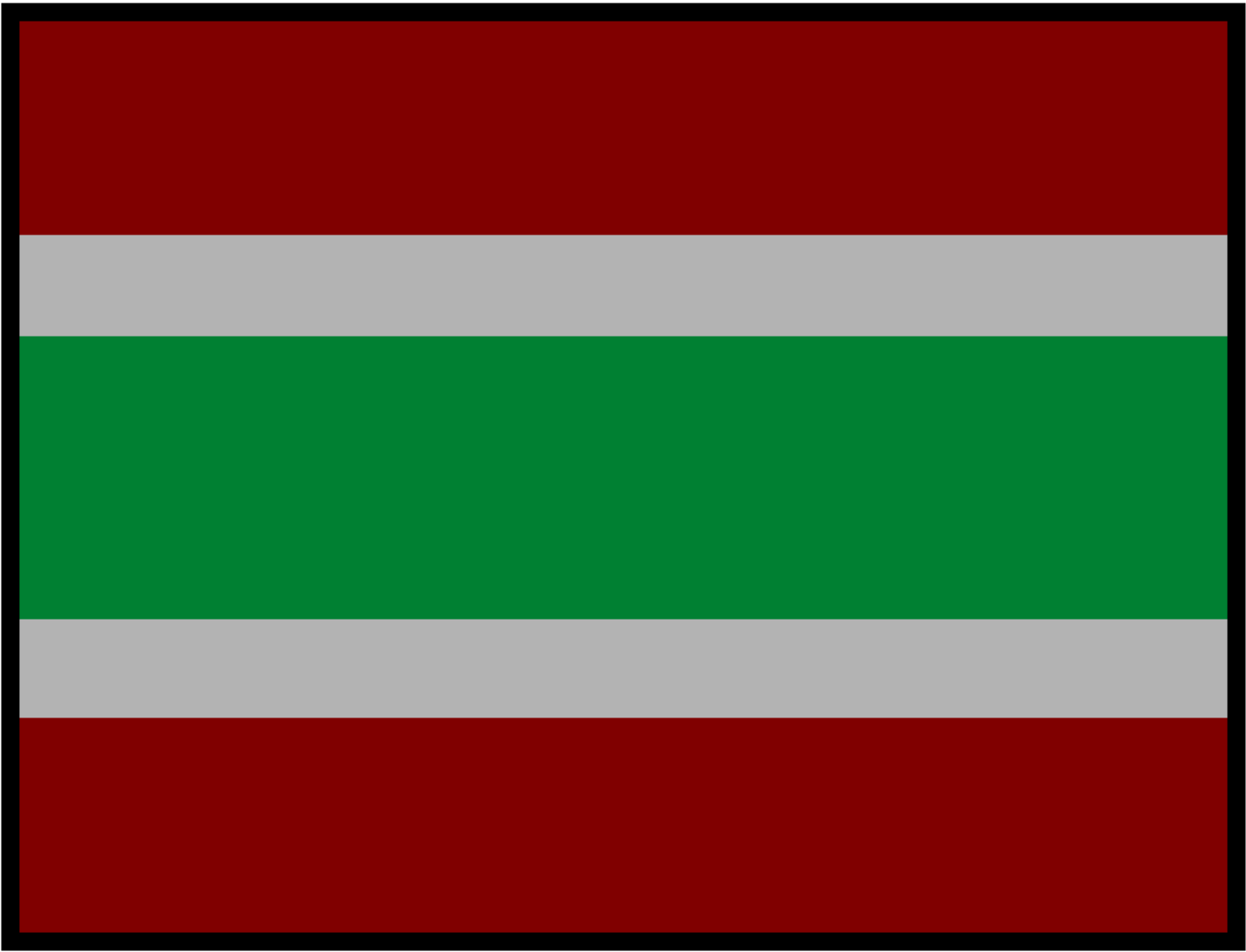
- Tactical Recognition Flash

1 Medical Regiment is a regiment of the British Army's Royal Army Medical Service currently based at Bhurtpore Barracks, Tidworth Camp, Wiltshire.

== History ==
The regiment was formed as 1 Close Support Medical Regiment on 1 April 2000, by the amalgamation of 1, 2 and 3 Armoured Field Ambulances. It was initially based in York Barracks in Munster, becoming 1 Medical Regiment on 1 April 2008, moving to Haig Barracks in Bergen-Hohne Garrison on 4 July 2012. It became 1 Armoured Medical Regiment on 1 April 2014, with the formation parade held in Bergen-Hohne on 5 July 2014. On 6 January 2015 that same year the regiment came under the command of the 3rd (United Kingdom) Division, attached to the 101st Logistic Brigade. The regiment moved to Dempsey Barracks in Sennelager in September 2015, supporting 20th Armoured Brigade.

The regiment deployed to Afghanistan on Operation Herrick 15 in October 2011 for six months, and for Operation Herrick 20, 30 Squadron deployed to provide the core of the last medical regiment in Afghanistan.

The regiment is paired with 335 Medical Evacuation Regiment, a specialist Army Reserve unit.

In 2019, as part of the overall withdrawal of British troops, the regiment moved to Bhurtpore Barracks from Sennelager.
