= 203 (Welsh) Multi-Role Medical Regiment =

203 (Welsh) General Hospital 203 (Welsh) Field Hospital 203 (Welsh) Multi-Role Medical Regiment
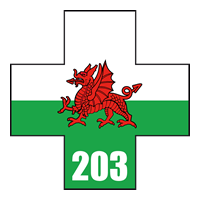
- Active: 1967 – present
- Country: United Kingdom
- Branch: British Army
- Role: Medical
- Size: Regiment; 202 personnel
- Part of: 2nd Medical Brigade
- Garrison/HQ: Cardiff

203 (Welsh) Multi-Role Medical Regiment is a unit of the Royal Army Medical Service within the Army Reserve of the British Army, based in Wales.

== History ==
The regiment was formed upon the formation of the TAVR in 1967, from the amalgamation of 3rd (Western) General Hospital, and 158th (Welsh) Field Ambulance, as the 203 (Welsh) General Hospital. Throughout the Cold War, the hospital was under the command of 160th (Welsh) Infantry Brigade; and on transfer to war, would re-subordinate to Commander Medical 1 (BR) Corps, providing 800 beds. During the reforms implemented after the Cold War, the hospital was re-designated as 203 (Welsh) Field Hospital. Under Army 2020, the unit was restructured under 2nd Medical Brigade, and was paired with the now disbanded 33 Field Hospital.

Under the Future Soldier programme, 203 (Welsh) Field Hospital was renamed as the 203rd (Welsh) Multi-Role Medical Regiment and now is under the command of 2nd Medical Group.

== Structure ==
The regiment's structure is as follows:

- Headquarters, at Llandaff, Cardiff
- A Detachment, at Swansea
- B Detachment, at Llandaff and Cwrt y Gollen
- C Detachment, at Bodelwyddan and Wrexham

== Freedoms ==
The regiment has received the freedom of several locations throughout its history; these include:

- (Wales) 19 September 2009: Llandudno.
- (Wales) 17 April 2010: Vale of Glamorgan.
