= 256 (City of London and South East) Multi-Role Medical Regiment =

- Active: 1995 – Present
- Country: United Kingdom
- Branch: British Army
- Role: Medical
- Size: Regiment; 203 personnel
- Part of: 2nd Medical Group
- Garrison/HQ: Walworth

Commanders
- Honorary Colonel: Professor Siobhan Gregory

256 (City of London and South East) Multi-Role Medical Regiment is a unit of the Royal Army Medical Service within the Army Reserve of the British Army.

== History ==
The hospital was formed in 1995, through the amalgamation of 217 (London) General Hospital, 257 (Southern) General Hospital, and 221 (Surrey) Field Ambulance, as 256 (London) Field Hospital. Later renamed ‘City of London’. As a result of Army 2020, the unit became under the command of 2nd Medical Brigade, and was paired with 33 Field Hospital.

Under the Future Soldier programme, the hospital was renamed as the 256 (City of London and South East) Multi-Role Medical Regiment in 2023. The regiment will remain under 2nd Medical Group.

== Structure ==
The regiment's current structure is as follows:

- Headquarters, at Braganza Street drill hall, Walworth
- A Detachment, at Braganza Street drill hall, Walworth
- B Detachment, at Iverna Gardens drill hall, Kensington
- C Detachment, at Kingston upon Thames
- D Detachment, at Quebec Barracks, Brighton
