= 202 (Midlands) Multi-Role Medical Regiment =

202 (Midland) General Hospital 202 (Midlands) Field Hospital 202 (Midlands) Multi-Role Medical Regiment
- Active: 1967 – Present
- Country: United Kingdom
- Branch: British Army
- Role: Medical
- Size: Regiment; 202 personnel
- Part of: 2nd Medical Brigade
- Garrison/HQ: Birmingham

Commanders
- Honorary Colonel: Professor Tim Briggs, CBE

202 (Midlands) Multi-Role Medical Regiment is an Army Reserve unit of the Royal Army Medical Service within the British Army.

== History ==
The hospital was formed upon the formation of the TAVR in 1967, from the amalgamation of 147th (South Midland) Field Ambulance, and 22nd (Birmingham) Field Dressing Station, as the 202 (Midland) General Hospital. During the Cold War, the hospital was under the command of the 143rd (West Midlands) Infantry Brigade, however upon transfer to war, it would re-subordinate to Commander Medical 1 (BR) Corps, and provide 800 beds with support from the Warwickshire Volunteer Band. During the reforms implemented after the Cold War, the hospital was re-designated as 202 (Midlands) Field Hospital. As a consequence of Army 2020, the unit now falls under 2nd Medical Brigade, and is paired with 22 Field Hospital.

Under the Future Soldier programme, the hospital was renamed as the 202nd (Midlands) Multi-Role Medical Regiment and now falls under the 2nd Medical Group.

== Current Structure ==
The current structure of the hospital is as follows:

- Headquarters, at Roger Nutbeem House, Birmingham
- A Detachment, at Baskeyfield House, Stoke-on-Trent
- B Detachment, at Roger Nutbeem House, Birmingham
- C Detachment, at Bligny House, Shrewsbury
