= 3 Medical Regiment =

- Regimental Crest
- Active: 2000 — Present
- Country: United Kingdom
- Allegiance: Royal Army Medical Service
- Branch: British Army
- Role: Medical
- Size: Regiment; 385 personnel
- Part of: 7th Light Mechanised Brigade Combat Team
- Garrison/HQ: Catterick Garrison
- Nickname(s): 3 Medical Regiment
- Engagements: World War I; World War II; Iraq War; 2003 invasion of Iraq; Operation Telic; War in Afghanistan; Operation Herrick
- Website: 3 Medical Regiment

3 Medical Regiment is a regiment of the British Army within the Royal Army Medical Service.

== History ==
3 Medical Regiment was formed in 2000 following the 1998 Strategic Defence Review. The regiment was formed from 3 squadrons: A (12) Medical Squadron, B (16) Medical Squadron, and C (24) Medical Squadron. Following their formation, the regiment was assigned to the 3rd (United Kingdom) Mechanised Division and based at Gaza Barracks. In 2002, the regiment was renamed as 3 Close Support Medical Regiment.

Over the next 10 years, from 2003 to 2013, the regiment saw multiple deployments to Iraq (OP Telic) and Afghanistan (OP Herrick).

In 2010, as a result of the Army 2020 reforms, the regiment was moved under operational control of the 102nd Logistics Brigade but supporting 3 UK Division.

In 2023, the regiment was disbanded with its former squadrons moved to other commands, before 5 Medical Regiment was re-designated as the new 3 Medical Regiment, under the Future Soldier reforms. The regiment is now based at Catterick Garrison, as part of 7th Light Mechanised Brigade Combat Team.
