= Royal Army Medical Service =

Medical Service of the British Army

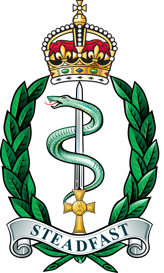
- Badge of the Royal Army Medical Service
- Active: 15 November 2024–present
- Country: United Kingdom
- Branch: British Army
- Type: Medical arm of the British Army
- Role: Medicine (all aspects including Dentistry)
- Garrison/HQ: Staff College, Camberley
- Motto: Steadfast
- Colours: Dull Cherry, Atholl Grey, Victoria Green.
- March: Here's a Health unto His Majesty
- Anniversaries: Corps Day (24 June)

Commanders
- Colonel-in-Chief: Prince Richard, Duke of Gloucester
- Deputy Colonel-in-Chief: Sophie, Duchess of Edinburgh
- Deputy Colonel-in-Chief: Birgitte, Duchess of Gloucester
- Master General Medical: Major-General Timothy Hodgetts

Insignia
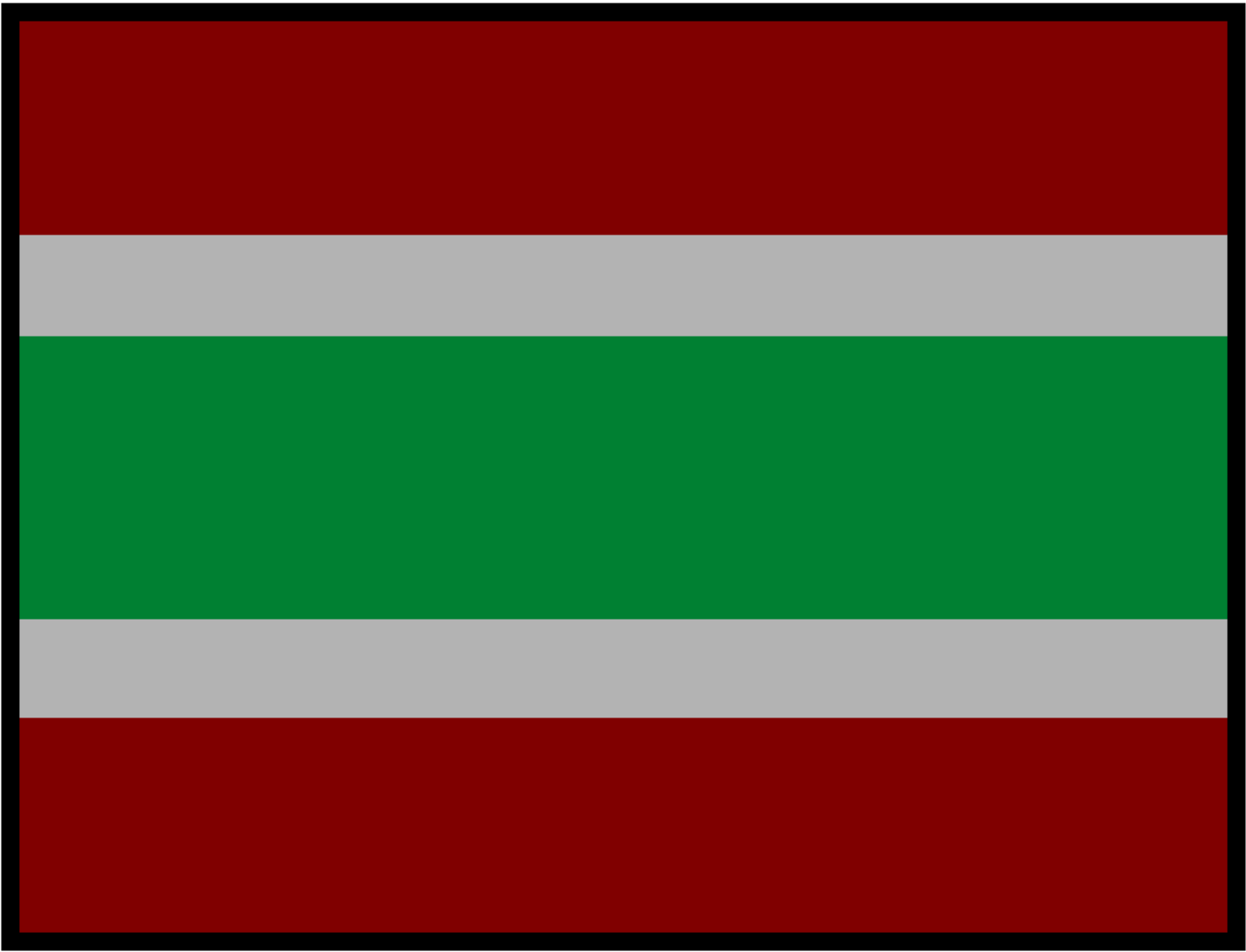
- Tactical Recognition Flash

The Royal Army Medical Service (RAMS) is a specialist corps in the British Army, formed on 15 November 2024, which provides health services, including medicine, nursing and dentistry to military personnel in war and in peace.

The Service was formed from the amalgamation of the Royal Army Medical Corps, Royal Army Dental Corps, and Queen Alexandra's Royal Army Nursing Corps.

== History ==
=== Formation of the Royal Army Medical Service ===
On 15 October 2024, it was announced in parliament that King Charles had approved the creation of the Royal Army Medical Service (RAMS) for the British Army. This formation was the result of an amalgamation process known as Project Victoria, which proposed an integration of the Army's three previous healthcare corps:

- Royal Army Medical Corps (RAMC),
- Queen Alexandra's Royal Army Nursing Corps (QARANC),
- Royal Army Dental Corps (RADC).

The Royal Army Veterinary Corps (RAVC) remains an independent corps outside of the Royal Army Medical Service due to their legal and operational combatant status which differs from the special protected status of the RAMC, RADC and QARANC.

The official amalgamation parade took place on 15 November 2024 at Staff College, Camberley.

=== Cap badge ===
The Royal Army Medical Service's cap badge is an amalgamation of elements from the three antecedent corps:

- Crown and Laurel - common to all three corps
- Sword blade from the Royal Army Dental Corps
- Dannebrog cross from the Queen Alexandra's Royal Army Nursing Corps
- Serpent from the Royal Army Medical Corps

== Units ==
- 21 Multi-Role Medical Regiment
- 22 Multi-Role Medical Regiment
- 202 (Midlands) Multi-Role Medical Regiment
- 203 (Welsh) Multi-Role Medical Regiment
- 206 (North West) Multi-Role Medical Regiment
- 210 (North Irish) Multi-Role Medical Regiment
- 214 (North East) Multi-Role Medical Regiment
- 215 (Scottish) Multi-Role Medical Regiment
- 243 (Wessex) Multi-Role Medical Regiment
- 254 (East of England) Multi-Role Medical Regiment
- 256 (City of London and South East) Multi-Role Medical Regiment
- 1 Medical Regiment
- 2 Medical Regiment
- 3 Medical Regiment
- 16 Medical Regiment
- 306 Hospital Support Regiment
- 335 Medical Evacuation Regiment
- Medical Operational Support Group

== Order of precedence ==
Preceded by Royal Logistic Corps	Order of Precedence	Succeeded by Royal Electrical and Mechanical Engineers
