= 335 Medical Evacuation Regiment =

- Active: 1 April 2016 as MER – present
- Country: United Kingdom
- Branch: British Army
- Type: Royal Army Medical Service
- Size: Regiment; 223 personnel
- Part of: 2 Medical Group; Field Army Troops
- Mottos: Curare Tueri Tollere "Caring, Protecting, Evacuating"
- Colors: Dull Cherry, Royal Blue, Old Gold
- Anniversaries: 1 April 2005
- Equipment: Platform agnostic - train to use NATO ambulance platforms.

Commanders
- Commanding Officer: Lt Col A Curphey RAMS
- Honorary Colonel: Col I Corrie PhD RAMS
- Regimental Sergeant Major: WO1(RSM) L Cullen RAMS

Insignia
- Tactical Recognition Flash

335 Medical Evacuation Regiment is a British Army medical regiment and part of 2 Medical Brigade. It is an Army Reserve unit, part of the Royal Army Medical Service, and has a unique role within the Armed Forces. The Regiment is designed to support the Evacuation Sqns of Multi-rolled Medical Regiments or Medical Regiments as tasked. Although it is administered from Queen Elizabeth Barracks in North Yorkshire, as a specialist unit the regiment recruits reservists from all over the UK.

== History ==
335 Medical Evacuation Regiment was formed on 1 April 2005 from the Ambulance Train Group (Volunteers). The Regiment has a long history which can be traced back to the ambulance trains of the Boer War of 1899 to 1902. It has deployed personnel on every major offensive, peacekeeping and humanitarian operation since 2005.

== Role ==
335 Medical Evacuation Regiment is the Army Reserve's specialist medevac unit. The Regiment under the integrated review trains high and medium dependency care clinicians and general ambulance crews to deploy on operations and exercises around the world either as an individual augmentee or as part of a formed unit. The Regiment provides two main capabilities:

- High and Medium dependency in transit care: Moving across the operational patient care pathway from the rear of Role 1 to handing over for strategic evacuation.
- General Ambulance Crews: For patient collection and movement.

The Regiment trains to operates in a range of Army ambulances platforms and focuses on Team and Crew clinical development, while maintaining personal skill to allow individual deployments.

== Organisation ==
335 Medical Evacuation Regiment has a Regimental Headquarters and two operational Squadrons: A and B. Each Squadron comprises several Troops which specialise in high, medium dependency and general crew capabilities.

The regiment is under 2 Medical Group, Field Army Troops and supports units as tasked.

== Personnel ==
335 Medical Evacuation Regiment has reservists from various trades and professions. As a specialist unit the regiment recruits reservists from all over the UK, and training is undertaken throughout the UK and overseas.

Soldiers

- Combat Medical Technician
- Paramedic
- Nurse
- Driver
- Human Resource Specialist

Officers

- Medical Officer
- Nursing Officer
- Medical Support Officer

== Notable personnel ==
- Corporal Ben Spittle RAMC. Paramedic awarded the Queen's Commendation for Valuable Service as a result of his actions in Afghanistan in 2013.
- Corporal Philip Keogh RAMC. Paramedic awarded Best Reservist in the 2017 The Sun Military Awards, known as the Millies, for his actions when responding to the terror attack at the Manchester Arena on 22 May 2017.
