= 2 Medical Regiment (United Kingdom) =

- Active: 4 July 2008 – 2018; 2023–present
- Country: United Kingdom
- Branch: British Army
- Type: Royal Army Medical Service
- Size: Regiment
- Part of: 12th Armoured Brigade Combat Team
- Garrison/HQ: Assaye Barracks, Tidworth Garrison
- Motto: Steadfast

2 Medical Regiment is a regiment of the Royal Army Medical Service in the British Army.

It was formerly disbanded in 2018, before being reactivated due to 4 Armoured Medical Regiment being re-designated as the 2nd Medical Regiment, as part of the Future Soldier reforms.

== History ==
2nd Medical Regiment was officially formed on 4 July 2008 following the amalgamation of (A)29 Squadron and (B)28 Squadron of 1 Close Support Medical Regiment. The regiment was based at Bergen-Hohne Garrison in Germany from its inception.

In March 2009, the regiment was deployed to Afghanistan on its first full operational deployment, contributing to Operation Herrick as the major component of the Joint Force Medical Group. The majority of the regiment was deployed to Helmand Province, with detachments in Kandahar and Kabul. The regiment returned to Hohne in October 2009.

In June 2015, 2nd Medical Regiment was reformed to Adaptable Force (AF) under Army 2020 and were re-based to St George's Barracks in Rutland, North Luffenham. 2nd Medical Regiment are "hybrid" in nature, with one Medical Squadron (29 Medical Squadron) being a full-time regular deployable Squadron, with two Area Support (Reserve) Squadrons based in Leicester and Hull.

2nd Medical Regiment formerly served 1st (United Kingdom) Division and was part of the Allied Forces Medical Group under 102 Logistic Brigade.

In June 2015, the regiment marched out of Hohne Garrison to complete its re-basing. After returning from Germany, the regiment relocated to St George's Barracks, North Luffenham.

The regiment deployed to Kenya in summer 2018 to take part in Exercise Askari Serpent 2018 delivering medical care to the local population.

== Disbandment and reactivation ==
The regiment remained at St George's Barracks until late 2018, when it was disbanded.

On 28 February 2023, 4 Armoured Medical Regiment was re-designated as the formerly disbanded 2 Medical Regiment, supporting 12th Armoured Brigade Combat Team.
