= Combat medical technician =

Soldier with a specialist trade

A combat medical technician (CMT) is a soldier with a specialist trade within the Royal Army Medical Service of the British Army.

== Role ==
The fully trained combat medical technician or CMT is capable of:

- assisting with the management of surgical, medical and psychiatric casualties from the onset of the condition until the casualty is admitted to a hospital offering specialist care. This capacity is to include the immediate necessary first aid and other sustaining procedures required to hold a casualty for a limited period in a non-hospital situation.
- undertaking the administrative procedures and documentation for casualties in field units, medical reception stations and unit medical centres, including those required for and during casualty

== Class 3 and 2 standards ==
- Trained in anatomy, physiology and first aid.
- Has a general understanding of medical terminology and is capable of carrying out first aid in an emergency situation until expert medical assistance is available
- Works under supervision to provide assistance to medical officers in field units and medical reception stations.
- Assists in setting up field medical units and is trained in medical fieldcraft including the use of radio equipment, navigation by foot or vehicle across country and field medical equipment
- Capable of carrying out basic nursing procedures
- Initiates and maintains casualty documentation and supply/equipment documentation
- Recognises abnormalities in casualty observations, body appearances and consciousness levels
- Trained in basic life support (BLS) to UK Resuscitation Council guidelines
- Trained in Army environmental health issues at unit level

== Class 1 standard ==
- As for Class 2 and 3, but with additional training and experience (see above)
- Provides health advice to non medical junior commanders
- Has a good understanding of anatomy and physiology
- Is able to take control of an emergency situation
- Is trained in basic diagnostic techniques and able to report findings to medical services
- Advises on basic field hygiene
- Capable of advanced first aid and using advanced resuscitation techniques
- Administers non-controlled drugs ordered by a medical officer
- Administers drugs by oral route, inhalations, plus intradermal-, intramuscular- and subcutaneous injection
- Sutures simple wounds
- Maintains, or supervises the maintenance of, and indents for medical equipment
- Trains junior medical assistants

Additionally, at Class 1 the CMT is trained in the procedures and principles of Battlefield Advanced Trauma Life Support (BATLS), which includes advanced life support, cricothyrotomy and thoracentesis.

== Further progression by rank ==
- At the rank of corporal, the combat medical technician also supervises and controls medical assistants working in medical unit departments, such as medical section 2 i/c in a close support (CS) medical regiment.
- At the rank of sergeant or staff sergeant, the combat medical technician takes charge of a department, accounting for equipment and carrying out the administrative duties for soldiers within the department, medical section commander in a close support (CS) medical regiment or a role 2 medical treatment facility within a general support (GS) medical regiment.
- At the rank of warrant officer, the combat medical technician supervises a number of departments, and maintains discipline and morale within those departments, providing for the efficiency and effectiveness of the unit.

== See also ==
- Medical Assistant (Royal Navy)
- Royal Army Medical Service
- Battlefield medicine
- Military medicine
- Medic
- Combat medic
- Flight medic
- Ambulance § Military use
