= 4 Armoured Close Support Battalion REME =

- Active: 2000–present
- Country: United Kingdom
- Branch: British Army
- Role: Equipment Support
- Size: Battalion; 406 personnel
- Part of: 12th Armoured Brigade
- Garrison/HQ: Jellalabad Barracks, Tidworth Camp
- Engagements: Operation Herrick

4 Armoured Close Support Battalion REME is a battalion of the Royal Electrical and Mechanical Engineers of the British Army.

== History ==
The battalion was formed in 2000, from the grouping of 9 Armoured Close Support Company, 10 Armoured Company, and 17 Field Support Company. Initially stationed at Prince Philip Barracks in Bordon, the battalion moved to Tidworth Camp in March 2010.

In September 2021, 100 personnel from the battalion performed public duties in London, marking the first time the corps has done so in more than 30 years.

== Future Soldier ==
Under the Future Soldier reforms, the battalion is due to re-subordinate to the 12th Armoured Brigade Combat Team.

== Structure ==
The battalion's current structure is as follows:

- 9 Armoured Company
- 10 Armoured Company
- 17 HQ Company
