= List of Territorial Army units (2012) =

This page is a historic list of units in the United Kingdom Territorial Army as of 2012, prior to its disestablishment, and re-establishment as the Army Reserve, in 2014.

== Honourable Artillery Company ==
- Honourable Artillery Company in Finsbury

== Royal Armoured Corps ==
- The Royal Yeomanry (Armoured Reconnaissance Role)
  - Regimental Headquarters, London
  - A (Royal Wiltshire Yeomanry) Squadron, Swindon
  - B (Leicestershire & Derbyshire Yeomanry) Squadron, Leicester
  - C (Kent & Sharpshooters Yeomanry) Squadron, Croydon
  - S (Sherwood Rangers Yeomanry) Squadron, Carlton
  - W (Westminster Dragoons) Squadron, Westminster
- The Queen's Own Yeomanry (Armoured Reconnaissance Role)
  - Regimental Headquarters, Newcastle upon Tyne
  - A (The Earl of Carrick's Own Ayrshire Yeomanry) Squadron, Ayr
  - B (North Irish Horse) Squadron, Belfast
  - C (Fife and Forfar Yeomanry/Scottish Horse) Squadron, Cupar
  - D (Northumberland Hussars Yeomanry) Squadron, Newcastle upon Tyne
  - Y (Queen's Own Yorkshire Yeomanry) Squadron, York
- The Royal Mercian and Lancastrian Yeomanry (Tank replacement role)
  - Regimental Headquarters, Dudley
  - A (Staffordshire, Warwickshire and Worcestershire Yeomanry) Squadron, Dudley
  - B (Shropshire Yeomanry) Squadron, Telford
  - C (The Earl of Chester's Own Cheshire Yeomanry) Squadron, Chester
  - D (The Duke of Lancaster's Own Yeomanry) Squadron, Wigan
  - Manoeuvre and Support Squadron, Hereford
- The Royal Wessex Yeomanry (Tank replacement role)
  - Regimental Headquarters, Bovington
  - A (The Queen's Own Dorset Yeomanry) Squadron, Bovington
  - C (Royal Gloucestershire Hussars Yeomanry) Squadron, Cirencester
  - D (Royal Devon Yeomanry) Squadron, Barnstaple/Paignton

== Royal Artillery ==
- 100 (Yeomanry) Regiment, Royal Artillery - Light artillery
  - Regimental Headquarters
  - 201 (Hertfordshire and Bedfordshire Yeomanry) Parachute Battery, Leagrave
  - 266 (Gloucestershire Volunteer Artillery) Battery, Clifton
  - 307 (South Nottinghamshire Hussars Yeomanry, Royal Horse Artillery) Battery, Nottingham
- 101 (Northumbrian) Regiment Royal Artillery - Artillery reconnaissance and MLRS
  - Regimental Headquarters
  - 203 (Elswick) Battery Royal, Blyth
  - 204 (Tyneside Scottish) Battery, Kingston Park
  - 205 (3rd Durham Volunteer Artillery) Battery, South Shields
  - 269 (West Riding) Battery, Leeds
- 103 (Lancastrian Artillery Volunteers) Regiment, Royal Artillery - Air defence
  - Regimental Headquarters including Lancashire Artillery Volunteer Band & Pipes and Drums of the Lancashire Volunteer Artillery
  - 208 (3rd West Lancashire) Battery, Liverpool
  - 209 (The Manchester and Saint Helens Artillery) Battery, Manchester/St Helens
  - 216 (The Bolton Artillery) Battery, Bolton
- 104 Regiment, Royal Artillery - MUAS
  - Regimental Headquarters, Newport
  - 211 (South Wales) Battery, Cardiff/Abertillery
  - 214 (Worcestershire) Battery, Worcester
  - 217 (City of Newport) Battery, Newport
- 105 Regiment, Royal Artillery - Light artillery
  - Regimental Headquarters
  - 206 (Ulster) Battery, Newtownards/Coleraine
  - 207 (City of Glasgow) Battery, Glasgow/Edinburgh
  - 212 (Highland) Battery, Arbroath/Kirkcaldy/Lerwick
- 106 (Yeomanry) Regiment, Royal Artillery - Air defence
  - Regimental Headquarters
  - 210 (Staffordshire) Battery, Wolverhampton
  - 265 (Home Counties) Battery, Grove Park
  - 457 (Hampshire Carabiniers Yeomanry) Battery, Southampton

== Royal Engineers ==
- Engineer and Logistic Staff Corps (roughly battalion sized)
- Royal Monmouthshire Royal Engineers (Militia), although termed militia, the regiment did not differ from its TA counterparts
  - Regimental Headquarters, Monmouth Castle
  - Headquarters Troop, Vauxhall Camp
  - 100 Field Squadron, Cwmbran/Llandaff/Cardiff/Bristol
  - 108 (Welsh) Field Squadron, Swansea/Gorseinon
  - 225 (City of Birmingham) Field Squadron, Oldbury/Walsall
  - Jersey Field Squadron (The Royal Militia Island of Jersey), Saint Helier
- 71 Engineer Regiment
  - Regimental Headquarters & Headquarters Troop, RAF Leuchars
  - 102 (Clyde) Field Squadron (Air Support), Paisley
  - 124 (Lowland) Field Squadron (Air Support), Cumbernauld
  - 236 Field Squadron (Air Support), Elgin/Kirkwall
  - 11 Combat Support Troop, RAF Leuchars
- 72 (Tyne Electrical Engineers) Engineer Regiment
  - Regimental Headquarters & Headquarters Troop, Gateshead
  - 103 (1st Newcastle) Field Squadron, Heaton
  - 106 (West Riding) Field Squadron, Greenhill
- 73 Engineer Regiment
  - Regimental Headquarters & Headquarters Troops, Nottingham
  - 350 (Nottinghamshire) Field Squadron, Chilwell
  - 575 (Sherwood Foresters) Field Squadron, Chesterfield/Derby
- 75 Engineer Regiment
  - Regimental Headquarters & Headquarters Troop, Warrington
  - 107 (Lancashire & Cheshire) Field Squadron, Birkenhead/Widnes
  - 125 (Staffordshire) Field Squadron, Stoke-on-Trent/Cannock
  - 202 (Duke of Lancaster's) Training Squadron, Manchester
- 101 (City of London) Engineer Regiment (Explosive Ordnance Disposal) This Regiment comprised both Regular and TA sub units, TA sub units were:
  - Regimental Headquarters, Ilford
  - 221 Field Squadron (EOD), Catford/Rochester
  - 579 Field Squadron (EOD), Royal Tunbridge Wells/Reigate/Brighton
- 65 Works Group, Chilwell [Only showing TA units]
  - 508 (Works) Specialist Team
  - 509 (Port Infrastructure & Works) Specialist Team
  - 525 (Works) Specialist Team
  - 556 (Works) Specialist Team
- 503 (Fuels Infrastructure) Specialist Team (Support regular 74 Works Group)
- 504 (Power Infrastructure) Specialist Team (Supports regular 63 Works Group)
- 506 (Water Infrastructure) Specialist Team (Supports regular 62 Works Group)
- 510 (Air Infrastructure) Specialist Team (Supports 66 Works Group)
- 131 Independent Commando Squadron, Kingsbury, London (Supports regular 24 Commando Engineer Regiment)
- 135 Independent Geographic Squadron, Ewell (Supports regular 42 Geographic Engineer Regiment)
- 591 (Antrim Artillery) Field Squadron, Royal Engineers, Bangor
- 299 Parachute Field Squadron, Wakefield/Kingston upon Hull/Pontefract
- 507 (Independent)(Rail Infrastructure) Specialist Team

== Royal Corps of Signals ==
- 32nd (Scottish) Signal Regiment
  - Regimental Headquarters & Headquarters Squadron, Glasgow
  - Northern Band of the Royal Corps of Signals, Nottingham
  - 33 (Lancashire and Cheshire) Signal Squadron, Liverpool/Manchester
  - 40 (Ulster) Signal Squadron, Belfast/Derry
  - 50 (Northumbrian) Signal Squadron, Darlington/Hartlepool
  - 51 (Highland) Signal Squadron, East Kilbride/Edinburgh
  - 52 (Lowland) Support Squadron, Glasgow
- 37th Signal Regiment
  - Regimental Headquarters & Headquarters Squadron, Redditch
  - 36 (Eastern) Signal Squadron, Colchester
  - 48 (City of Birmingham) Signal Squadron, Birmingham
  - 53 (Welsh) Signal Squadron, Cardiff
  - 54 (Worcestershire) Support Squadron, Redditch
  - 854 (East Anglia) Signal Troop, Cambridge
  - 867 (Queen's Own Warwickshire & Worcestershire) Signal Troop, Stratford-upon-Avon
  - 896 (Worcestershire and Sherwood Foresters) Signal Troop, Coventry
- 38th (City of Sheffield) Signal Regiment
  - Regimental Headquarters & Headquarters Squadron, Sheffield
  - 1 (Royal Buckinghamshire Yeomanry) Signal Squadron, Milton Keynes/Banbury/Rugby
  - 2 (City of Dundee) Signal Squadron, Dundee/Aberdeen
  - 41 (Princess Louises's Kensingtons) Signal Squadron, Croydon/Kingston upon Thames
  - 46 (Hallamshire) Support Signal Squadron, Sheffield
  - 64 (Sheffield) Signal Squadron, Leeds/Sheffield/Nottingham
- 39th (The Skinners) Signal Regiment
  - Regimental Headquarters & Headquarters Squadron, Horfield
  - 56 (Home Counties) Signal Squadron, Brighton/Eastbourne
  - 57 (City and County of Bristol) Signal Squadron, Bristol/Gloucester
  - 94 (Berkshire Yeomanry) Signal Squadron, Aylesbury/Windsor
- 71st (City of London) Yeomanry Signal Regiment
  - Regimental Headquarters & Headquarters Squadron, Bexleyheath
  - 47 (Middlesex Yeomanry) Signal Squadron, Uxbridge/Southfields
  - 68 (Inns of Court & City Yeomanry) Signal Squadron, City of London/Whipps Cross/Chelmsford
  - 265 (Kent and County of London Yeomanry) Support Squadron, Bexleyheath
- 43 (Wessex) Signal Squadron (Air Support), Bath (Supports regular 21 Signal Regiment (Air Support))
- 63 (SAS) Signals Squadron, Thorney Island
- 81 (Merseyside) Signal Squadron, Corsham

== Infantry ==
- Royal Regiment of Scotland
  - 52nd Lowland Volunteers, 6th Battalion, The Royal Regiment of Scotland
    - Battalion Headquarters & Headquarters Squadron, Glasgow (Includes the Lowland Band of the Royal Regiment of Scotland and 6 SCOTS Pipes and Drums)
    - A (Royal Scots Borderers) Company, Edinburgh/Bathgate/Galashiels
    - B (Royal Highland Fusiliers) Company, Ayr/Dumfries
    - C (Royal Highland Fusiliers) Company, Glasgow/Motherwell
  - 51st Highland Volunteers, 7th Battalion, The Royal Regiment of Scotland
    - Battalion Headquarters & Headquarters Squadron, Perth (Includes the Highland Band of the Royal Regiment of Scotland and 7 SCOTS Pipes and Drums)
    - A (Black Watch) Company, Dundee/Kirkcaldy
    - B (Highlanders) Company, Aberdeen/Peterhead/Keith/Lerwick
    - C (Highlanders) Company, Inverness/Wick/Stornoway
    - D (Argyll and Sutherland Highlanders) Company, Dumbarton/Dunoon
- The Princess of Wales's Royal Regiment
  - 3rd (Volunteer) Battalion, The Princess of Wales's Royal Regiment
    - Battalion Headquarters & Headquarters Company, Canterbury/Dover (includes the Corps of Drums of the battalion & Regimental Band, also including Training (Tangier) Wing)
    - A (Queen's Royal Surreys) Company, Farnham/Camberley
    - B (Royal Sussex) Company, Brighton/Worthing
    - C (The Buffs) Company, Rochester/Dover
    - D (Duke of Connaught's) Company, Portsmouth
- The London Regiment
  - Regimental Headquarters and Headquarters (Anzio) Company, Battersea
  - A (London Scottish) Company, Westminster/Catford (including Pipes and Drums)
  - B (Queen's Regiment) Company, Edgware/Hornsey (including Corps of Drums)
  - C (City of London Fusiliers) Company, Batham (including Corps of Drums)
  - D (London Irish Rifles) Company, Camberwell (including Pipes and Drums)
- The Duke of Lancaster's Regiment
  - 4th (Volunteer) Battalion, The Duke of Lancaster's Regiment
    - Battalion Headquarters and Headquarters Company, Preston (including Corps of Drums & Regimental Band)
    - A (King's Regiment) Company, Liverpool
    - B (Queen's Lancashire Regiment) Company, Blackburn/Blackpool
    - C (King's Own Royal Border Regiment) Company, Workington/Carlisle/Barrow-in-Furness
    - D (King's Regiment) Company, Manchester/Bury
- The Royal Regiment of Fusiliers
  - 5th (Volunteer) Battalion, The Royal Regiment of Fusiliers
    - Battalion Headquarters and Headquarters Company, Durham (including Corps of Drums & Regimental Band)
    - C (Rifles) Company, Washington/Bishop Auckland/Doncaster
    - X Company, Newcastle upon Tyne/Tynemouth
    - Z Company, Ashington/Alnwick
- The Royal Anglian Regiment
  - 3rd (Volunteer) Battalion, The Royal Anglian Regiment
    - Battalion Headquarters and Headquarters (Suffolk) Company, Bury St Edmunds (including Corps of Drums)
    - A (Norfolk and Suffolk) Company, Norwich/Lowestoft
    - B (Lincolnshire) Company, Lincoln/Grimsby
    - C (Leicestershire and Northamptonshire) Company, Leicester/Northampton
    - E (Essex and Hertfordshire) Company, Chelmsford/Hertford
- The Yorkshire Regiment
  - 4th (Volunteer) Battalion, The Yorkshire Regiment
    - Battalion Headquarters and Headquarters Company, York/Scarborough (including Corps of Drums)
    - A (Prince of Wales's Own Regiment of Yorkshire) Company, Kingston upon Hull/Beverley/Leeds
    - B (Green Howards) Company, Middlesbrough/Northallerton
    - C (Duke of Wellington's Regiment) Company, Huddersfield/Keighley
    - D (Duke of Wellington's Regiment) Company, Barnsley/Sheffield
- The Mercian Regiment
  - 4th (Volunteer) Battalion, The Mercian Regiment
    - Battalion Headquarters and Headquarters Company, Wolverhampton (including Corps of Drums)
    - A (Cheshire) Company, Warrington/Stockport
    - B Company, Crewe/Stoke-on-Trent
    - C (Worcestershire and Sherwood Foresters) Company, Mansfield
    - D (Staffordshire) Company, Wolverhampton/Kidderminster/Burton upon Trent
    - F (Fusilier) Company, Birmingham
    - L (Light Infantry) Company, Shrewsbury/Herford
- The Royal Welsh
  - 3rd (Volunteer) Battalion, The Royal Welsh
    - Battalion Headquarters and Headquarters Company, Cardiff (including Corps of Drums)
    - A (Royal Welch Fusiliers) Company, Wrexham/Queensferry
    - B (Royal Regiment of Wales) Company, Swansea/Aberystwyth
    - C (Royal Regiment of Wales) Company, Cardiff/Pontypridd
    - D (Royal Welch Fusiliers) Company, Colwyn Bay/Caernarfon
- The Royal Irish Regiment
  - The Rangers, Royal Irish Regiment
    - Battalion Headquarters and Headquarters Company, Portadown/Enniskillen (including Pipes and Drums)
    - A Company, Newtownards
    - B Company, Newtownabbey/Newtownabbey
    - C Company, Armagh/Enniskillen/Ballymena
- The Rifles
  - 6th (Volunteer) Battalion, The Rifles
    - Battalion Headquarters and Headquarters (Devonshire and Dorset) Company, Exeter (including Band and Bugles of 6 RIFLES)
    - A (Gloucestershire) Company, Gloucester/Bristol
    - B Company, Taunton/Exeter
    - C (Devonshire and Dorset) Company, Dorchester/Poole
    - D Company, Bodmin/Plymouth
  - 7th (Volunteer) Battalion, The Rifles
    - Battalion Headquarters and Headquarters (Devonshire and Dorset) Company, Reading (including Band and Bugles of 7 RIFLES)
    - A Company, Oxford
    - E Company, Milton Keynes
    - F Company, Davies Street, London
    - G Company, West Ham, London
- The Parachute Regiment
  - 4th (Volunteer) Battalion, The Parachute Regiment
    - Battalion Headquarters and Headquarters Company, Pudsey
    - 10 (London) Company, White City, London/Croydon
    - 12 (Yorkshire) Company, Pudsey/Hebburn
    - 13 (Lancashire) Company, Manchester
    - 15 (Scottish) Company, Glasgow/Edinburgh

== Special Air Service ==
- 21 (Artists) Special Air Service (Reserve)
  - Regimental Headquarters, London
  - A Squadron, Regent's Park Barracks
  - B Squadron, Newport
  - C Squadron, Bramley
- 23 Special Air Service Regiment (Reserve)
  - Regimental Headquarters, Birmingham
  - A Squadron, Invergowrie/Glasgow
  - B Company, Leeds
  - C Squadron, Newcastle upon Tyne/Manchester

== Army Air Corps ==
- 6th (Volunteer) Regiment, Army Air Corps
  - Regimental Headquarters and Support Squadron, Bury St Edmunds
  - No. 677 (Suffolk and Norfolk Yeomanry) Squadron, Bury St Edmunds/Swaffham/Norwich
  - No. 655 (Scottish Horse) Squadron, Army Aviation Centre

== The Royal Logistic Corps ==
- 88th Postal and Courier Regiment, Grantham
- 150th (Yorkshire) Transport Regiment
  - Regimental Headquarters and 523 Headquarters Squadron, Kingston upon Hull
  - 217 (Yorkshire) Transport Squadron, Leeds
  - 218 (East Riding) Transport Squadron, Kingston upon Hull
  - 219 (West Riding) Transport Squadron, Doncaster
- 151st (London) Logistic Support Regiment
  - Regimental Headquarters and 508 Headquarters Squadron, Croydon
  - 124 Petroleum Transport Squadron, Bedford/Ilford
  - 210 Transport Squadron, Sutton/Maidstone
  - 240 (Hertfordshire) Tank Transport Squadron, Barnet/Ilford
  - 562 Transport Squadron, Acton/Southall/Clapham
- 152nd (Ulster) Transport Regiment
  - Regimental Headquarters and 580 Headquarters Squadron, Belfast
  - 211 Transport Squadron, Derry/Coleraine
  - 220 Transport Squadron, Belfast
  - 400 Transport Squadron, Belfast
- 155th (Wessex) Transport Regiment
  - Regimental Headquarters and 241 Headquarters Squadron, Plymouth
  - 232 Transport Squadron, Bodmin/Truro
  - 233 Transport Squadron, Poole/Dorchester
  - 245 Transport Squadron, Plymouth
- 156th (North West) Transport Regiment
  - Regimental Headquarters and 235 Headquarters Squadron, Liverpool
  - 234 (Wirral) Transport Squadron, Birkenhead
  - 236 (Greater Manchester) Transport Squadron, Salford
  - 238 (Sefton) Transport Squadron, Bootle
- The Welsh Transport Regiment
  - Regimental Headquarters and 249 Headquarters Squadron, Cardiff
  - 223 Transport Squadron, Swansea
  - 224 (Pembroke Yeomanry) Transport Squadron, Carmarthen/Haverfordwest
  - 580 Transport Squadron, Cardiff
- The Scottish Transport Regiment
  - Regimental Headquarters and 527 Headquarters Squadron, Dunfermline
  - 221 Transport Squadron, Glasgow
  - 230 Transport Squadron, Edinburgh
  - 231 Transport Squadron, Glenrothes
  - 251 Transport Squadron, Irvine
- 158th (Royal Anglian) Transport Regiment
  - Regimental Headquarters and 200 (Peterborough) Headquarters Squadron, Peterborough
  - 201 (Bedford) Transport Squadron, Bedford/Peterborough
  - 202 (Ipswich) Transport Squadron, Ipswich
  - 203 Transport Squadron, Loughborough/Melton Mowbray
- 159th Support Regiment
  - Regimental Headquarters, Stoke-on-Trent
  - 123 Ammunition Squadron, Telford
  - 126 Rations Squadron, Glasgow
  - 216 (Tyne Tees) Brigade Support Squadron, Tynemouth
  - 237 (West Midlands) Brigade Support Squadron, West Bromwich/Stoke-on-Trent
- 160th Transport Regiment
  - Regimental Headquarters, Grantham
  - 124 Petroleum Squadron
  - 261 Transport Squadron
  - 263 Transport Squadron
  - 270 Transport Squadron
- 162nd Movement Control Regiment
  - Regimental Headquarters, Grantham
  - 280 Movement Control Squadron, Swindon
  - 281 Operations Squadron
  - 282 Movement Control Squadron
  - 283 Movement Control Squadron
  - 284 Movement Control Squadron
- 165th Port and Maritime Regiment
  - Regimental Headquarters, Grantham
  - 102 Port Operations Squadron
  - 265 Port Squadron
  - 266 (Princess Beatrice's) Port Support Squadron, Southampton/Isle of Wight
- 166th Supply Regiment
  - Regimental Headquarters, Grantham
  - 142 Vehicle Squadron
  - 294 Supply Squadron
  - 531 Ammunition Technical Squadron
  - 710 Operational Hygiene Squadron
- 168th Pioneer Regiment
  - Regimental Headquarters, Middlesbrough
  - 100 Pioneer Squadron, Cramlington/Berwick-upon-Tweed/Hexham
  - 101 Pioneer Squadron, Grantham
  - 104 Pioneer Squadron, Coulby Newham/Middlesbrough/Hartlepool/Washington
- Catering Support Regiment
  - Regimental Headquarters, Grantham
  - 111 Squadron
  - 112 Squadron
  - 113 Squadron
- 383 Commando Petroleum Troop, Plymouth
- 395 Air Despatch Troop, RAF Brize Norton

== Corps of Royal Electrical and Mechanical Engineers ==
- 101 Force Support Battalion
  - Battalion Headquarters and Headquarters Company, Wrexham
  - 119 Recovery Company, Prestatyn
  - 126 Field Company, Coventry
  - 127 Field Company, Manchester
- 102 Battalion
  - Battalion Headquarters and Headquarters Company, Newton Aycliffe
  - 124 Recovery Company, Newton Aycliffe
  - 153 Field Company, Grangemouth
  - 186 Field Company, Newcastle upon Tyne
- 103 Battalion
  - Battalion Headquarters and Headquarters Company, Crawley
  - 128 Field Company, Portsmouth
  - 133 Field Company, Ashford
  - 150 Recovery Company, Redhill
- 104 Force Support Battalion
  - Battalion Headquarters and Headquarters Company, Bordon
  - 118 Recovery Company, Northampton
  - 146 Field Company, Rotherham
  - 147 Field Company, Scunthorpe

== Intelligence Corps ==
- 3rd Military Intelligence Battalion
  - Battalion Headquarters, Ashford
  - 31 Military Intelligence Company, Ashford
  - 32 Military Intelligence Company, Ashford
  - 33 Military Intelligence Company, Hampstead
  - 34 Military Intelligence Company, Hampstead/Cosham
- 5th Military Intelligence Battalion
  - Battalion Headquarters, Coulby Newham
  - 52 Military Intelligence Company, Edinburgh
  - 53 Military Intelligence Company, York
  - 54 Military Intelligence Company, Bristol
  - 55 Military Intelligence Company, Stourbridge

== Army Medical Services ==
- Central Reserves Headquarters, Army Medical Services, Strensall Camp
- Army Medical Services Operational Headquarters Support Group, Strensall Camp

=== Royal Army Medical Corps ===
- 201 (Northern) Field Hospital
  - Regimental Headquarters, Newcastle upon Tyne
  - A Squadron, Newton Aycliffe
  - B Squadron, Newcastle upon Tyne
  - C Squadron, Stockton-on-Tees
- 202 (Midlands) Field Hospital
  - Regimental Headquarters, Birmingham
  - A Squadron, Stoke-on-Trent/Coventry
  - B Squadron, Shrewsbury
  - C Squadron, Abingdon-on-Thames
- 203 (Welsh) Field Hospital
  - Regimental Headquarters, Cardiff
  - A Squadron, Swansea
  - B Squadron, Cwrt y Gollen
  - C Squadron, Llandudno
- 204 (North Irish) Field Hospital
  - Regimental Headquarters, Belfast
  - A Squadron, Belfast
  - B Squadron, Belfast
  - C Squadron, Belfast
  - D Squadron, Portadown
- 205 (Scottish) Field Hospital
  - Regimental Headquarters, Glasgow
  - A Squadron, Aberdeen
  - D Squadron, Dundee
  - E Squadron, Edinburgh
  - G Squadron, Glasgow
  - I Squadron, Inverness
- 207 (Manchester) Field Hospital
  - Regimental Headquarters, Manchester
  - A Squadron, Stockport
  - B Squadron, Bury
  - C Squadron, Manchester
  - G Squadron, Chorley
- 208 (Liverpool) Field Hospital
  - Regimental Headquarters, Liverpool
  - A Squadron, Liverpool
  - B Squadron, Chester
  - C Squadron, Blackpool/Lancaster
- 212 (Yorkshire) Field Hospital
  - Regimental Headquarters, Sheffield
  - A Squadron, Leeds/York
  - B Squadron, Nottingham/Lincoln
  - C Squadron, Kingston upon Hull
- 225 (Scottish) Medical Regiment
  - Regimental Headquarters and 174 Support Squadron, Dundee
  - 152 Medical Squadron, Glenrothes
  - 153 Medical Squadron, Dundee
  - 251 Medical Squadron, Sunderland
- 243 (Wessex) Field Hospital
  - Regimental Headquarters, Keynsham
  - A Squadron, Keynsham/Gloucester
  - B Squadron, Exeter
  - C Squadron, Plymouth/Truro
  - D Squadron, Portsmouth
- 253 (North Irish) Field Ambulance
  - Regimental Headquarters and 110 Support Squadron, Sunderland
  - 107 Medical Squadron, Belfast
  - 108 Medical Squadron, Limavady/Enniskillen
  - 109 Medical Squadron, Belfast
- 254 (East of England) Medical Regiment
  - Regimental Headquarters and 63 Support Squadron, Cambridge
  - 220 Medical Squadron, Ditton
- 256 (City of London) Field Hospital
  - Regimental Headquarters, Walworth
  - A Squadron, Walworth
  - B Squadron, Kensington
  - C Squadron, Kingston upon Thames
  - D Squadron, Brighton
- 306th Hospital Support Regiment, Strensall Camp
- 335th Medical Evacuation Regiment, Strensall Camp
- 64 Medical Squadron, Chorley/Manchester/Liverpool (under regular 3 Medical Regiment)
- 144 Medical Parachute Squadron, Glasgow/Nottingham/Cardiff
- 222 Medical Squadron, Leicester/Derby/Birmingham (under regular 2 Medical Regiment)
- 250 Medical Squadron, Kingston upon Hull/Grimsby/Castleford (under regular 2 Medical Regiment)

== Adjutant General's Corps ==
- Central Volunteer Headquarters Adjutant General's Corps
- Army Legal Services
- Educational and Training Support
- Military Provost Staff
- Military Provost Guard Service
- Royal Military Police Special Investigation Branch
- 4 Regiment, Royal Military Police
- 5 Regiment, Royal Military Police

== Army Reserve bands ==
Army Reserve bands are not part of the Corps of Army Music. They are under the direct command of their parent corps or regiment.

There are currently 20 Army Reserve bands located across the UK with one in Gibraltar:

- Band of the Honourable Artillery Company
- Regimental Band (Inns of Court & City Yeomanry) of the Royal Yeomanry
- Lancashire Artillery Volunteers Band
- The Nottinghamshire Band of the Royal Engineers
- The (Northern) Band of the Royal Corps of Signals
- Lowland Band of the Royal Regiment of Scotland
- Highland Band of the Royal Regiment of Scotland
- Band of the Princess of Wales's Royal Regiment (Queen's and Royal Hampshires)
- Band of the Royal Regiment of Fusiliers
- Band of the Royal Anglian Regiment
- Band of The Royal Irish Regiment (27th (Inniskilling) 83rd and 87th and Ulster Defence Regiment)
- Band of the Royal Welsh
- Band of the Duke of Lancaster's Regiment (King's Lancashire and Border)
- Band of the Yorkshire Regiment (14th/15th, 19th & 33rd/76th Foot)
- The Band of The Mercian Regiment
- The Salamanca Band of The Rifles
- The Waterloo Band of The Rifles
- Band of the 150th (Yorkshire) Transport Regiment, The Royal Logistic Corps
- Band of the Army Medical Services
- Volunteer Band of the Royal Gibraltar Regiment

Pipes and Drums

- Pipes and Drums of the Lancashire Artillery Volunteers
- Pipes and Drums of the 52nd Lowland, 6th Battalion The Royal Regiment of Scotland
- Pipes and Drums of the 51st Highland, 7th Battalion The Royal Regiment of Scotland
- Pipes and Drums of the London Scottish
- Pipes and Drums of the London Irish Rifles
- Pipes and Drums of 152 (Ulster) Transport Regiment (Volunteers) Royal Logistic Corps`
- Pipes and Drums of 102bn REME
- Drums and Pipes of Aberdeen UOTC
- Pipes and Drums of City of Edinburgh UOTC
- Pipes and Drums of Glasgow UOTC
- Pipes and Drums of Tayforth UOTC

== Officers' Training Corps ==
Many British Universities also have Officer Training Corps units, which allow students to experience military life. University Officer Training Corps (UOTCs) still officially form part of the Army Reserve. However, the officer cadets fall into reserve category "B", meaning that they cannot be called up for service unless there is a national emergency.

- Aberdeen UOTC
- Birmingham UOTC
- Bristol UOTC
- Cambridge UOTC
- East Midlands UOTC
- City of Edinburgh UOTC
- Exeter UOTC
- Glasgow and Strathclyde UOTC
- Leeds UOTC
- Liverpool UOTC
- Manchester & Salford UOTC
- Northumbrian UOTC
- Oxford UOTC
- Queen's UOTC
- Sheffield UOTC
- Southampton UOTC
- Tayforth UOTC
- Wales UOTC
- University of London OTC
