= Dare Wilson Barracks =

Military installation in Hexham, Northumberland

- Hexham
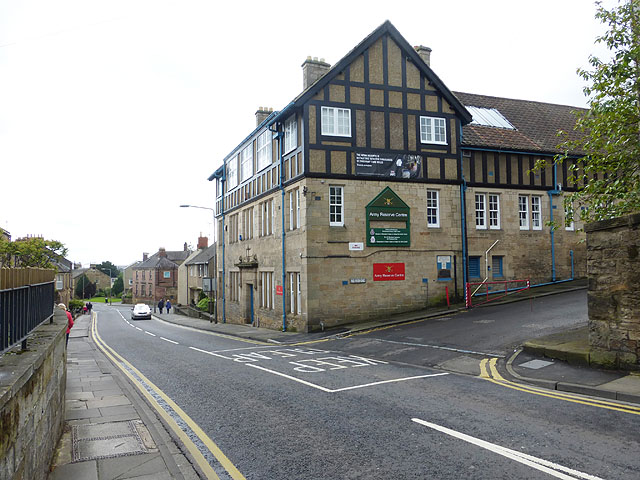
- Hencotes drill hall, Hexham

Site information
- Type: Drill hall

Location
- Location within Northumberland
- Coordinates: 54.96945°N 2.10892°W

Site history
- Built: 1891
- Built for: War Office
- In use: 1891-Present

Dare Wilson Barracks, is a military installation in Hexham, Northumberland, England. The building is named after Major General Dare Wilson who was commissioned into the Royal Northumberland Fusiliers and commanded 22 Special Air Service Regiment in the early 1960s.

== History ==
The building was designed as the headquarters of the 1st Volunteer Battalion, The Northumberland Fusiliers and was completed in about 1891. This unit evolved to become the 4th Battalion the Northumberland Fusiliers in 1908. The battalion was mobilised at the drill hall in August 1914 before being deployed to the Western Front.

The battalion was redesignated the 4th/5th Battalion the Royal Northumberland Fusiliers at Hencotes in 1950. The battalion was reduced to a cadre in 1969 but reconstituted at the Fenkle Street drill hall in Alnwick as the 6th (Volunteer) Battalion, The Royal Regiment of Fusiliers in 1975 with a rifle platoon forming part of X Company still located at Hencotes. X Company was transferred to the Tyne-Tees Regiment in 1999 and to 5th Battalion, The Royal Regiment of Fusiliers in 2006.

== Current units ==
British Army

- X Company, 5th Battalion, Royal Regiment of Fusiliers
- Hexham Troop, 204 (Tyneside Scottish) Battery, 101 (Northumbrian) Regiment, Royal Artillery

Community Cadet Forces

- Hexham Detachment, Northumbria Army Cadet Force
- 224 (Hexham) Squadron, Durham and Northumberland Wing, Air Training Corps
