= 205 (3rd Durham Volunteer Artillery) Battery Royal Artillery =

British Army reserve artillery battery

205 (3rd Durham Volunteer Artillery) Battery Royal Artillery (Volunteers)
- Active: 1860–present
- Country: United Kingdom
- Branch: British Army
- Type: Precision fire
- Part of: 101st (Northumbrian) Regiment Royal Artillery
- Location: South Shields, South Tyneside
- Equipment: M270 Multiple Launch Rocket System

205 (3rd Durham Volunteer Artillery) Battery Royal Artillery is part of the 101st (Northumbrian) Regiment Royal Artillery and is equipped with the M270 Multiple Launch Rocket System. It is based in South Shields, United Kingdom.

The Battery can trace its history back to the formation of the 3rd Durham Volunteer Artillery in 1860. Its history exemplifies the single Battle Honour of the Royal Artillery - "Ubique" (Everywhere), serving in the major battles of both world wars.

In more recent times Battery members have seen active service in Bosnia, Kosovo, Iraq and Afghanistan.

== Artillery Volunteers 1859–1908 ==
In 1859, the Volunteer Force was created as a result of rising tensions on the European continent. An appeal was made to citizens to form Artillery Volunteer Corps (AVCs) in maritime towns. In the County of Durham this appeal resulted in the formation of four Corps in 1860:

- 1st Durham AVC (Sunderland)
- 2nd (Seaham) Durham Artillery Volunteer Corps (Seaham)
- 3rd Durham AVC (South Shields)
- 4th Durham AVC (Hartlepool)

Some of the batteries within the 1st and 3rd Corps were part of the Northumberland Artillery Volunteers. In 1893 the War Office Mobilisation Scheme had allocated the 3rd Durham Artillery Volunteers to the Tyne fixed defences. In 1899, the 3rd Durham Volunteer Artillery were retitled the 3rd Durham Royal Garrison Artillery (Volunteers).

== Territorial Army ==
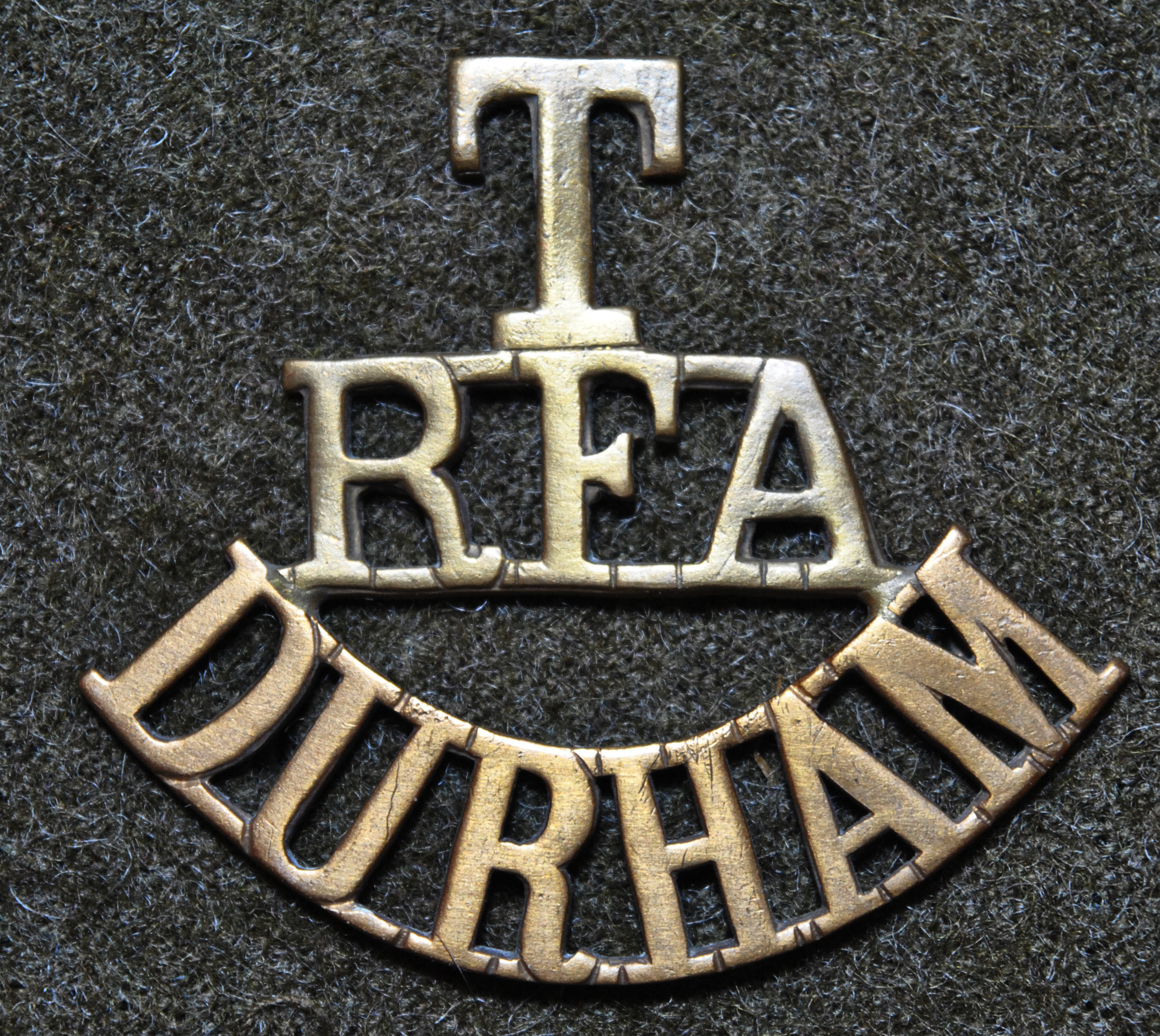
Territorial shoulder title worn by the Northumbrian (County of Durham) Brigades RFA.

On the formation of the Territorial Force in 1908, the 3rd Durham RGA re-roled as Royal Field Artillery and provided the 4th Durham (Howitzer) Battery and 4th Northumbrian Ammunition Column of the 4th Northumbrian (County of Durham) Howitzer Brigade RFA (T).

== First World War ==
The Brigade mobilised in August 1914 and deployed to France in April 1915. In early May, the Brigade were the first Territorial field gunners to engage in the Ypres fighting in the Second Battle of Ypres. A reorganisation of Field brigades in 1916 saw the 4th Durham Battery transferred to 250 (Northumbrian Brigade) as D/250 Battery, the 5th Durhams going to 251 Brigade, D/251 Battery. These units would go on to take part in the Battles of the Somme, Arras and Passchendaele, before the final battles of 1918.

== Inter-War ==
On the re-forming of the Territorial Army in 1921, the brigade became the 3rd (Northumbrian) Field Brigade RA (TA), which was then re-designated as the 74th Field Brigade RA (TA). A re-organisation of Artillery Field Brigades in 1938 resulted in the formation of the 74th (Northumbrian) Field Regiment RA (TA) together with a duplicate unit, 125th (Northumbrian) Field Regiment RA (TA).

== Second World War ==
The 74th Regiment mobilised as divisional Artillery within the 50th (Northumbrian) Infantry Division, supporting 151st Infantry Brigade (United Kingdom), The Durham Light Infantry Brigade, with whom it served from 1939 to 1944. The Regiment deployed to France in 1940 as part of the British Expeditionary Force (BEF). It returned to the UK in the Dunkirk evacuation.

In 1941, it embarked with the 8th Army for the Mediterranean and Middle East Theatre. Initially, the Regiment took part in the Jock column actions to harass the enemy. Supporting 151 (DLI) Brigade, it was engaged in the Battle of Gazala, breaking out through Mersa Matruh to avoid capture, (although suffering many casualties). Following re-fitting and re-equipment, the Regiment was engaged in the Second Battle of El Alamein, followed by the assault on the Mareth Line. Joining the Italian Campaign, it landed in the Allied invasion of Sicily where it was engaged in the battle of Primosole Bridge (Operation Fustian) and the barrage across the Straits of Messina as part of the invasion of Italy.

The Regiment's next major action was D-Day and the Invasion of Normandy, landing on Gold Beach with the 50th Northumbrian (Infantry) Division. It was subsequently involved in the breakout from Normandy in Operation Perch. Later service through Northwest Europe saw the Regiment involved in the liberation of Brussels and the battle of the Gheil bridgehead on the Albert Canal. In September 1944, it formed part of Operation Market Garden. When the rest of the 50th Division returned to England in November, 74 Regiment was attached to 49th (West Riding) Infantry Division, being engaged on the Grebbe line. Following the German surrender in May 1945, the Regiment remained in the Army of Occupation, returning to South Shields in 1946.

74 (Northumbrian) Field Regiment fought with distinction in some of the most decisive battles of the Second World War, winning three DSOs, seven MCs and eight MMs.

125 (Northumbrian) Field Regiment re-roled as 125 Anti-Tank Regiment in 1940. It deployed to the Far East and was captured in 1942. Many of the Regiment became Prisoners of War.

== 1947-1967 ==
In 1947, the Territorial Army was reconstituted, 74 Regiment was re-formed as 274 (Northumbrian) Field Regiment RA (TA), with 125 Regiment converted to 325 (Durham) LAA (Light Anti-Aircraft) Regiment RA (TA). Following subsequent amalgamations, 325 Regiment was absorbed by 463 (Durham Light Infantry) Light Air Defence Regiment RA (TA). On the disbandment of Anti-Aircraft Command in 1955, 274 Regiment absorbed 487 HAA (Heavy Anti-Aircraft) Regiment RA (Durham) (TA) and 377 (Durham) Observation Regiment RA (TA).

== 101 (Northumbrian) Regiment RA (V) ==
In 1967, the TA became the Territorial Army and Volunteer Reserve (TAVR). As part of this re-structuring, 101 (Northumbrian) Medium Regiment RA (V) was formed. 205 Medium Battery was constituted from 274 Field and 463 LAA Regiments. In 1974, the honour title 3rd Durham Volunteer Artillery was adopted by the Battery.

Initially equipped with the 5.5 inch gun, the Battery converted to the 105mm Light Gun in 1980 and to FH-70 in 1991. The Battery was the last to fire 101 Regiment's guns during the prestigious Queen's Cup, which it won for the second year running. The following year, in 1997, 205 Battery converted to a missile Battery equipped with M270 Multiple Launch Rocket System and became the first TA Battery to fire that weapon system.

== Publications ==
- Beckett, Ian F.W., Riflemen Form: A study of the Rifle Volunteer Movement 1859–1908, Aldershot: Ogilby Trusts, 1982, ISBN 0-85936-271-X.
- Dildy, Doug (2010). Dunkirk 1940: Operation Dynamo. Osprey. ISBN 978-1-84603-457-2.
- Hogg, Brigadier OFG. The History of the 3rd Durham Volunteer Artillery 1860-1960.
- Litchfield, Norman E H, and Westlake, R, 1982. The Volunteer Artillery 1859-1908, The Sherwood Press, Nottingham. ISBN 0-9508205-0-4
- Litchfield, Norman E H, 1992. The Territorial Artillery 1908-1988, The Sherwood Press, Nottingham. ISBN 0-9508205-2-0
- Thompson, GR. A Geordie goes to War. ISBN 1-904244-22-X.
