= BL 5-inch howitzer =

Ordnance BL 5-inch howitzer
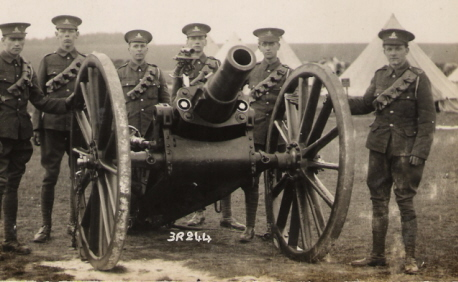
- Territorial Force gunners with howitzer in camp pre-WWI
- Type: Field howitzer
- Place of origin: United Kingdom

Service history
- In service: 1895 – 1919
- Used by: United Kingdom; Kingdom of Romania; Russian Empire
- Wars: Mahdist War; Second Boer War; First World War

Specifications
- Mass: 2,672 lb (1,212 kg)
- Barrel length: 42 inches (1.07 m) bore (8.4 calibres)
- Shell: 50 lb (22.7 kg) Common shell 50 lb (22.7 kg) Lyddite shell 40 lb (18.1 kg) Amatol shell
- Calibre: 5-inch (127.0 mm)
- Breech: 3-motion, interrupted screw
- Recoil: 5.5 in (140 mm), Hydro-spring constant
- Carriage: Wheeled, box trail
- Elevation: -5° - 45°
- Muzzle velocity: 788 ft/s (240 m/s)
- Effective firing range: 4,800 yards (4,400 m) (50 lb shell); 6,500 yards (5,900 m) (40 lb shell)
- Filling weight: 9 pounds 15 ounces (4.51 kg) (Lyddite); 5 pounds (2.27 kg) (Amatol)

The Ordnance BL 5-inch howitzer was initially introduced to provide the Royal Field Artillery with continuing explosive shell capability following the decision to concentrate on shrapnel for field guns in the 1890s.

== Combat service ==
=== Sudan Campaign ===
The weapon was used by the Royal Field Artillery and served successfully at the Battle of Omdurman in 1898. During that campaign they gained the distinction of being the first British guns to fire the new Lyddite shells in action.

=== Second Boer War ===
Major D Hall states that in the Second Boer War the Lyddite shells often failed to detonate; the gun was too heavy to be used as a field howitzer, and for siege use its range was too short and shell too light. However, it achieved some success in Natal when able to get close enough to bombard Boers in trenches.

=== World War I ===
By 1908 it was obsolete and replaced in British Regular Army brigades by the modern QF 4.5-inch howitzer.

Territorial Force brigades, however, continued to use the howitzer in World War I into 1916, including notably at the ANZAC and Suvla beachheads, Gallipoli, and in the East African campaign.

A lighter 40-pound (18.14 kg) shell with Amatol filling replaced the original 50-pound (22.68 kg) Lyddite shell early in World War I Together with an increase in cordite propellant from 11 oz 7 drams to 14 oz 5 drams, this increased the maximum range from 4,800 to 6,500 yards (5,900 m). Administrative error led to the new 40-pound shells being sent to Gallipoli without range tables or fuze keys for the new pattern fuzes, rendering them useless.

== Gallery ==
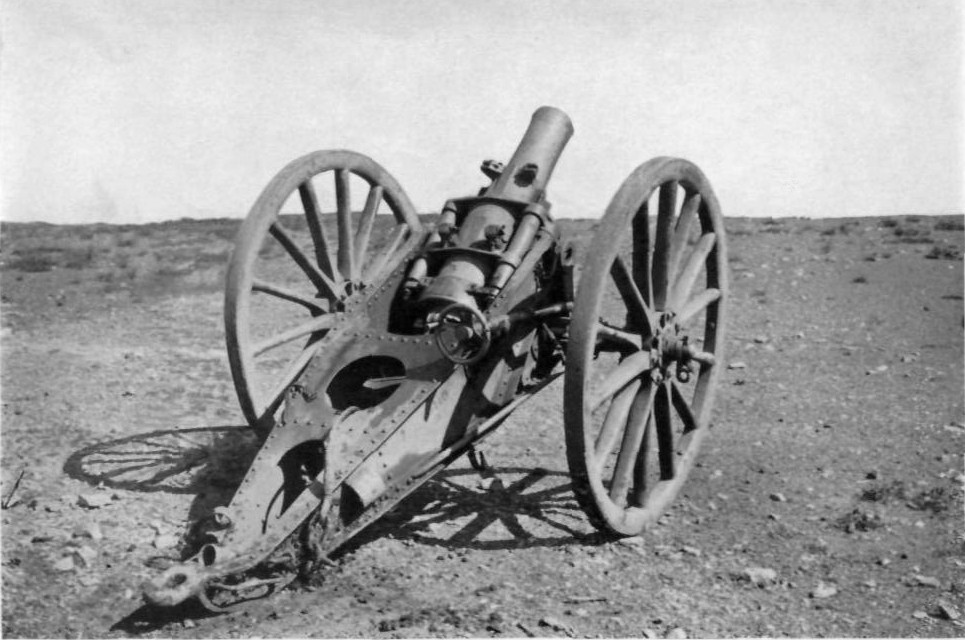
A rear view of the BL 5-inch Howitzer.

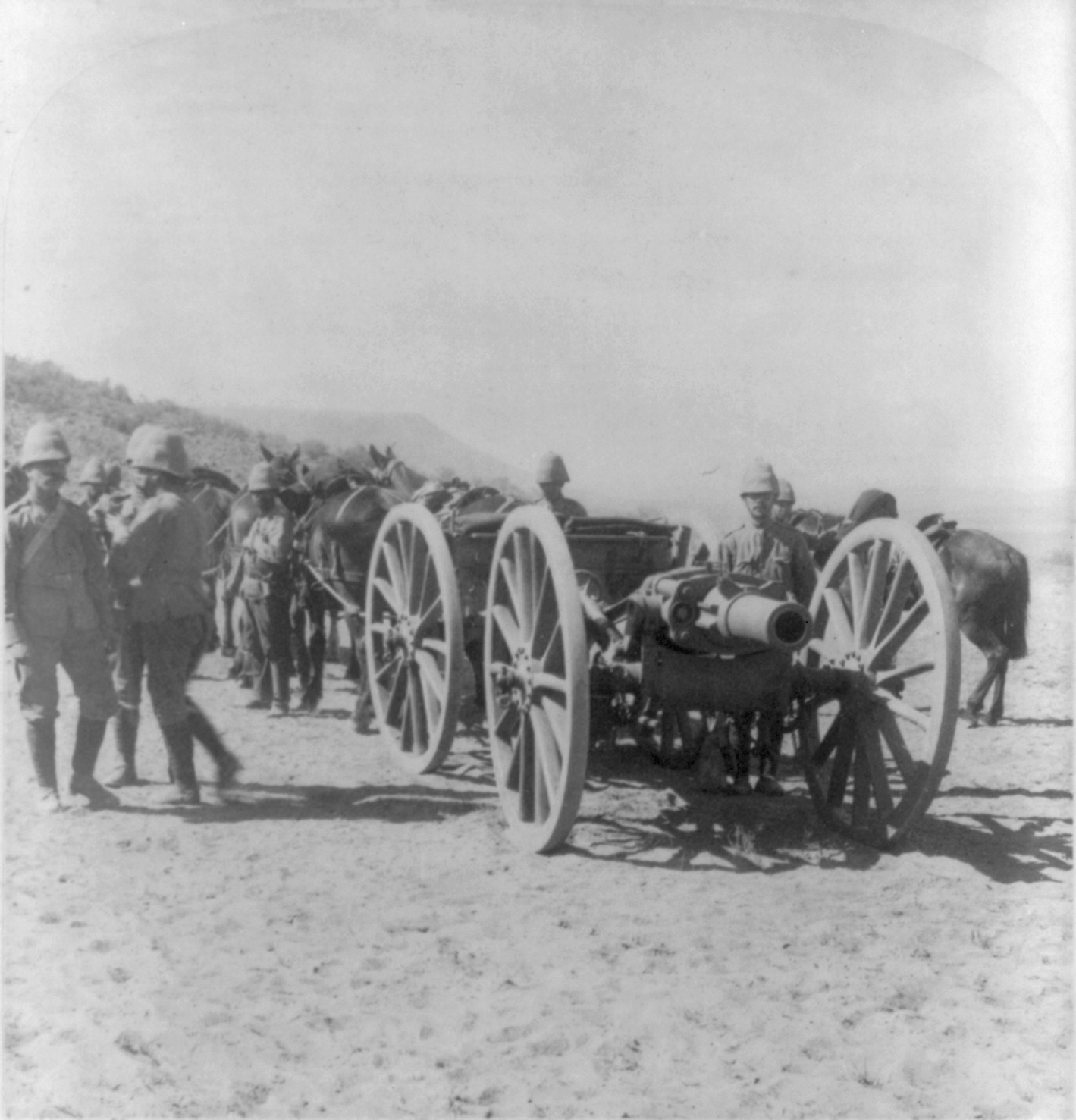
Approaching Maddox Hill, Northern Cape, January 1900.

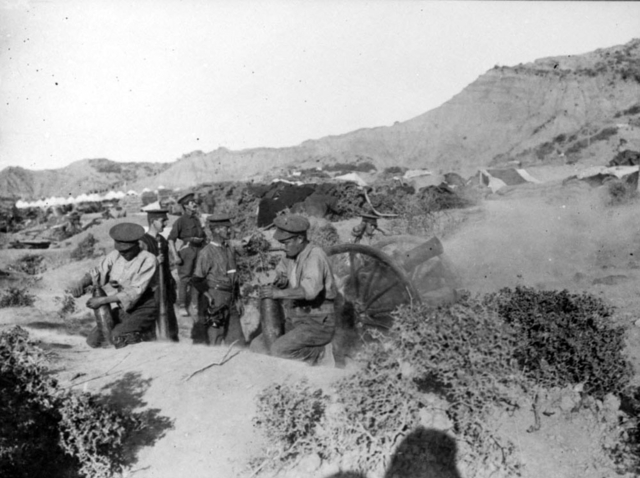
In action on Gallipoli, 1915.

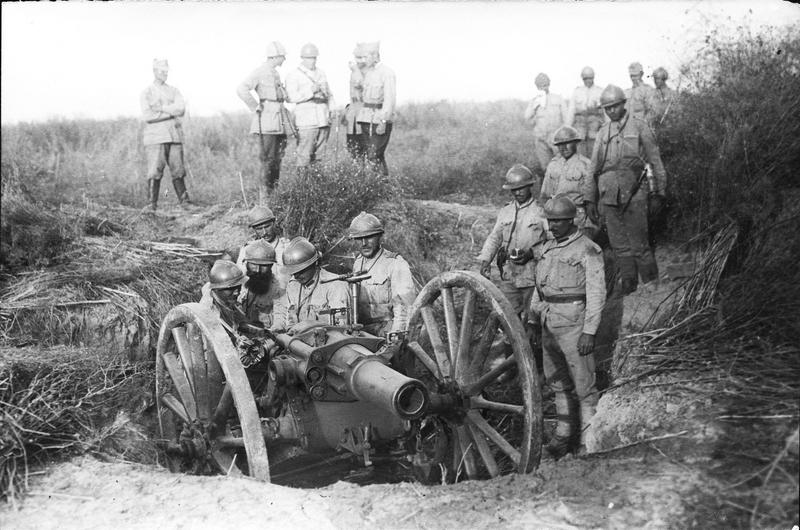
A BL 5-inch Howitzer in Romanian service during World War I. Romania received 28 howitzers in 1917.

== Ammunition ==
Cordite cartridge 11 oz 7 dram Mk V, for 50 lb projectile	50 lb Common shell Mk III	50 lb Common lyddite shell Mk IV	T Friction tube Mk IV

== See also ==
- Howitzer
- List of howitzers

== Bibliography ==
- Text Book of Gunnery, 1902. LONDON : PRINTED FOR HIS MAJESTY'S STATIONERY OFFICE, BY HARRISON AND SONS, ST. MARTIN'S LANE
- Dale Clarke, British Artillery 1914-1919. Field Army Artillery. Osprey Publishing, Oxford UK, 2004 ISBN 1-84176-688-7
- Major Darrell D. Hall, "Guns in South Africa 1899-1902" in The South African Military History Society. Military History Journal - Vol 2 No 1, June 1971
- I.V. Hogg & L.F. Thurston, British Artillery Weapons & Ammunition 1914-1918. London: Ian Allan, 1972
- Brigadier-General Sir Hugh Simpson-Baikie, Ex-Commander of the British artillery at Cape Helles. Appendix I STATEMENT ON ARTILLERY in General Sir Ian Hamilton, G.C.B. Gallipoli Diary Vol. II. New York: George H. Doran Company, 1920
- Hogg, Ian. Twentieth-Century Artillery. New York: Barnes & Noble Books, 2000. ISBN 0-7607-1994-2 Pg.46
- România în războiul mondial 1916-1919, Documente, Anexe, Volumul 1, Monitorul Oficial și Imprimeriile Statului, București. Pg. 42

== Surviving examples ==
- At Karak Castle, Jordan
- National Military Museum, Bucharest, Romania
