= 204 (Tyneside Scottish) Battery Royal Artillery =

British Army reserve artillery battery

- Active: 1967–Present
- Country: United Kingdom
- Branch: British Army
- Role: Precision fire
- Part of: 101st (Northumbrian) Regiment Royal Artillery
- Garrison/HQ: Kingston Park, Newcastle upon Tyne
- Equipment: M270 Multiple Launch Rocket System

204 (Tyneside Scottish) Battery Royal Artillery is part of 101st (Northumbrian) Regiment Royal Artillery, an artillery regiment of the British Army.

== History ==
The battery was formed from 324th (Northumbrian) Heavy Anti-Aircraft Regiment, Royal Artillery which was formed after the Second World War and equipped with the Thunderbird missile system. After the war the TA was reconstituted formally on 1 January 1947, and recruitment began on 1 May 1947. 324 Regiment had been based at the drill hall opposite the Gosforth Greyhound Stadium on the North Road in Gosforth. (Note: The drill hall on the North Road, which was specially equipped with garaging for an artillery regiment, was commissioned in February 1939.)

Following the defence cuts implemented in 1967, the TA was reorganised as the Territorial and Army Volunteer Reserve (TAVR) and 324 Regiment in Gosforth was reduced to a single battery viz. 204 Battery, becoming part of the newly formed 101 (Northumbrian) Medium Regiment RA (V). 204 Medium Battery was initially equipped with the BL 5.5-inch medium gun but remained at the drill hall on the North Road in Gosforth. In 1974, the battery took on its Tyneside Scottish designation, recalling the Pals battalion which had served in the First World War. Since then, the battery has maintained its Tyneside Scottish traditions by wearing the tam o'shanter headdress with a red hackle as part of its uniform.

The battery converted to the 105mm Light Gun in 1980, shortly before it moved to the drill hall in Church Street in Walker in 1981. After briefly converting to the FH-70 Howitzer in 1993, and then moving to the Army Reserve Centre on Beaminster Way East in Kingston Park in 1994, the battery took on a support role providing elements to HQ 1 Artillery Brigade in 1998 and then converted to a surveillance and target acquisition role in 2004. The battery also established a troop at Dare Wilson Barracks in Hexham. Members of the battery were deployed to Camp Bastion and other places in Afghanistan, as part of Operation Herrick 15 in November 2011 and as part of Operation Herrick 16 in May 2012 during the War in Afghanistan.

Under Army 2020, the battery re-roled to the M270 Multiple Launch Rocket System. The conversion to the new weapon system started in spring 2014.

In January 2024, members of 204 Battery took part in a 35 mile march to commemorate a march undertaken by their predecessors, the Tyneside Scottish, from Newcastle upon Tyne to Alnwick in January 1915, prior to their deployment to the Western Front, during the First World War.

== Sources ==
- Hewitson, T. L. (2006). Weekend Warriors from Tyne to Tweed. Tempus Publishing. ISBN 978-0752437569.
