= 203 (Elswick) Battery Royal Artillery =

British Army reserve artillery battery

- Active: 1900–Present
- Country: United Kingdom
- Branch: British Army
- Role: Precision Fire
- Part of: 101st (Northumbrian) Regiment Royal Artillery
- Garrison/HQ: Blyth, Northumberland
- Equipment: M270 Multiple Launch Rocket System

203 (Elswick) Battery Royal Artillery is a part of 101st (Northumbrian) Regiment Royal Artillery, an artillery regiment of the British Army.

== History ==
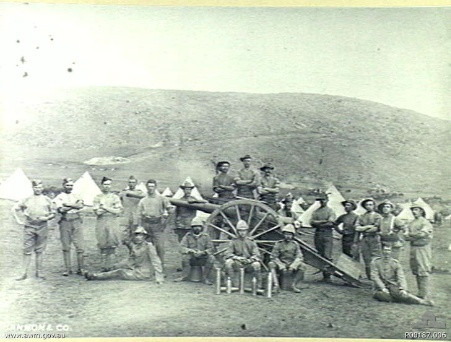
'C' Section of the Elswick Battery, South Africa, c1901

Formed on 31 January 1900, the Elswick Battery, as it was then known, set off for South Africa to take part in the Second Boer War. The Battery was armed with 12 pounder guns manufactured by Armstrongs at Elswick. The guns had been paid for by Lady Meux, an eccentric brewery heiress.

Following the defence cuts implemented in 1967, the Territorial Army was reorganised as the Territorial and Army Volunteer Reserve (TAVR) and three batteries of the Royal Artillery in Blyth and Seaton Delaval were merged to form 203 Battery based in Blyth, part of 101st (Northumbrian) Regiment Royal Artillery. The battery took on the Elswick Battery designation, recalling the unit which had served in the Second Boer War, in 1974. One of the 12-pounder guns which had been used by the original unit was restored and preserved in the drill hall in Cowpen Road in Blyth. The Battery was equipped with the BL 5.5-inch medium gun in 1967, converting to the 105mm Light Gun in 1980.

In April 1992, the Battery was again re-equipped, this time with FH-70 howitzers and, in 1998, the Battery became the first reservist battery to be equipped with the M270 Multiple Launch Rocket System (MLRS).

Representatives of the battery attended the unveiling of a statue of a Boer War soldier sculpted by Ray Lonsdale at Ward Jackson Park in Hartlepool in September 2020. The statue was installed on top of a stone memorial and was intended to replace a previous statue which disappeared in 1968. Although the ceremony was attended by representatives from other military units, the Elswick Battery was the only unit mentioned on the memorial which is still in existence.

== Sources ==
- Hewitson, T. L. (2006). Weekend Warriors from Tyne to Tweed. Tempus Publishing. ISBN 978-0752437569.
