= Fenkle Street drill hall =

Military installation in Northumberland, England

- Alnwick
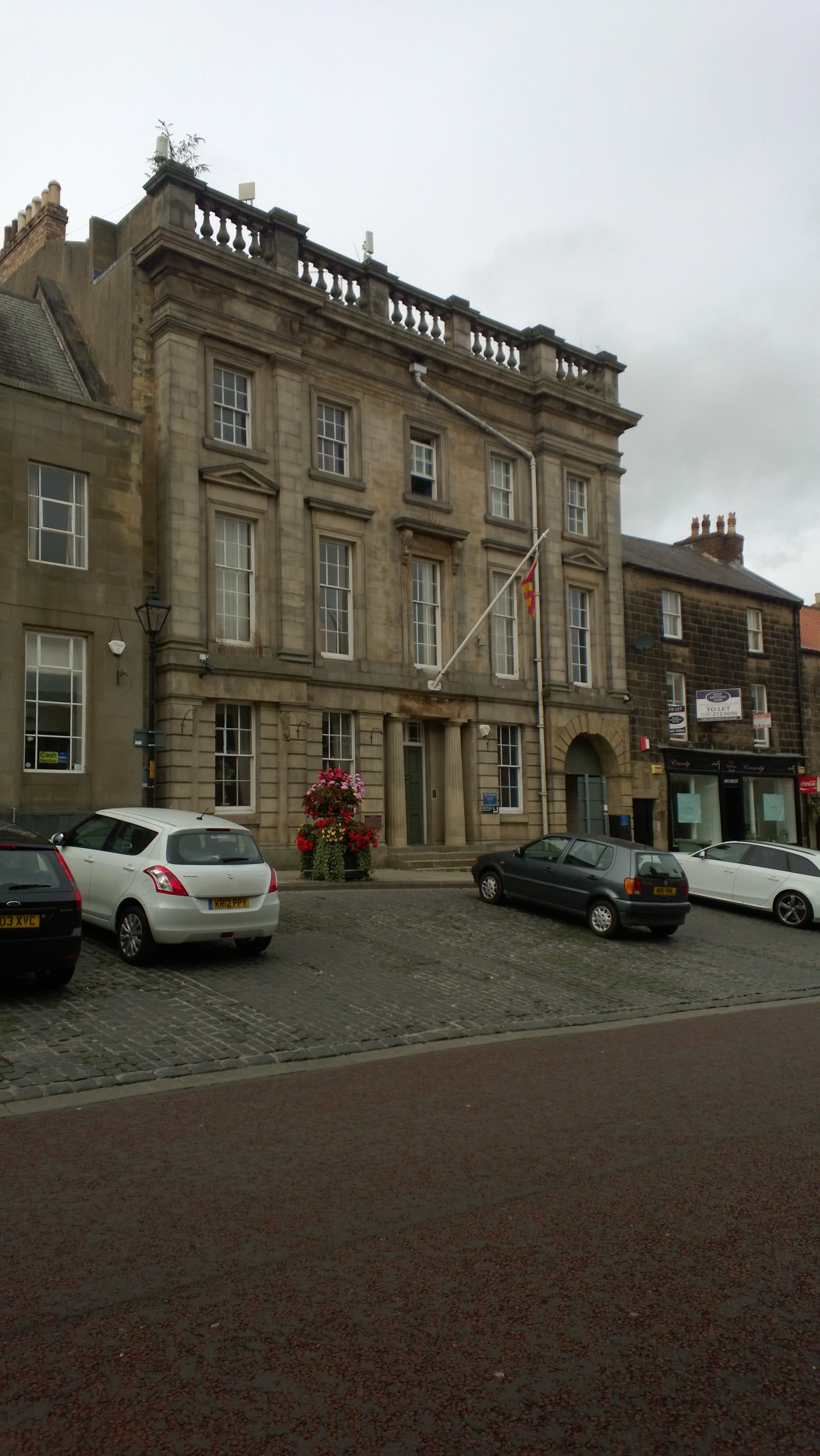
- Fenkle Street drill hall, Alnwick

Site information
- Type: Drill hall

Location
- Location within Northumberland
- Coordinates: 55.41387°N 1.70807°W

Site history
- Built: 1834
- Built for: War Office
- In use: 1834-1995

The Fenkle Street drill hall is a former military installation in Alnwick, Northumberland. It is a Grade II* listed building and is now used by the Northumberland County Council.

== History ==
The building, which was originally designed as a library and completed in 1834, was extended to form the headquarters of the 1st Volunteer Battalion, The Northumberland Fusiliers in 1887. The 1st Volunteer Battalion moved to the Hencotes drill hall in Hexham in 1891 but D Company remained at Alnwick and this unit, together with C Company and G Company, evolved to become the 7th Battalion the Northumberland Fusiliers in 1908. The battalion was mobilised at the drill hall in August 1914 before being deployed to the Western Front.

The battalion was reduced to a cadre at Ashington in 1969 but reconstituted as the 6th (Volunteer) Battalion, The Royal Regiment of Fusiliers with its headquarters at Fenkle Street in 1975. After the battalion headquarters moved to the Ravensdowne drill hall in Berwick-upon-Tweed in 1975, a rifle platoon forming part of W Company remained at Fenkle Street but, in the 1990s, moved to the Lisburn Terrace Army Reserve Centre. The Fenkle Street building was subsequently converted into offices and is now occupied by the Northumberland County Council Register Office.
