= FV300 Series =

FV301
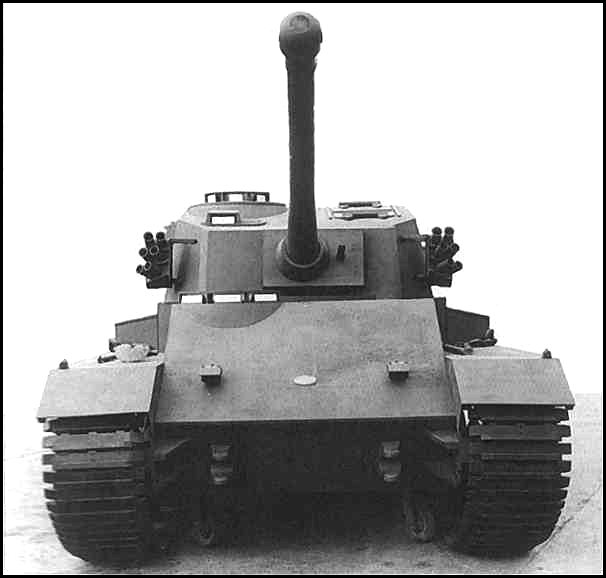
- Vickers Medium Cruiser Mk. 1 - export tank derived from the FV301
- Type: Light tank
- Place of origin: United Kingdom

Production history
- Manufacturer: Vickers
- No. built: 2 prototypes

Specifications (FV301)
- Mass: 21 tons
- Crew: 3
- Armour: 2 inch
- Main armament: 77 mm HV; 80 rounds
- Secondary armament: co-axial .30 cal Browning machine gun
- Engine: Rolls-Royce Meteor; 500 hp
- Suspension: Torsion bar

The FV300 series was a project for a series of lightweight armoured fighting vehicles by the United Kingdom between 1947 and 1950, a few years after World War II.

== History ==
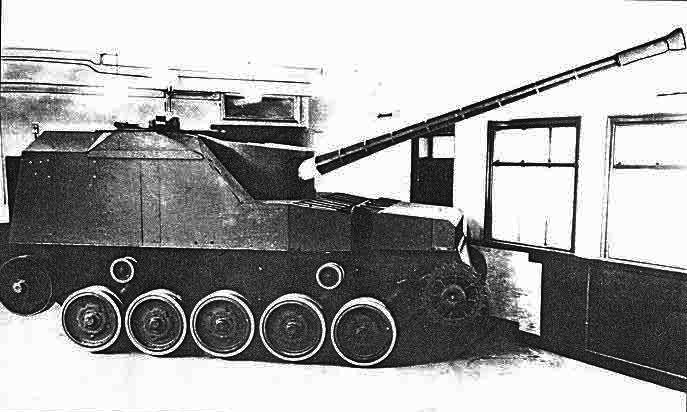
FV303 SPG.

The development and construction of the tank was carried out by Vickers. However, only two prototypes were built. The project ended in 1950 at the prototype stage.

== Variants ==
- FV301 — 21 ton tank with 77mm gun
- FV302 — GPO/CPO Command Vehicle
- FV303 — 20-pdr Self Propelled Gun
- FV304 — 25-pdr Self Propelled Gun
- FV305 — 5.5-inch Self Propelled Gun
- FV306 — Light Armoured Recovery Vehicle
- FV307 — Radar Vehicle
- FV308 — Field Artillery Tractor
- FV309 — Royal Artillery section vehicle
- FV310 — Armoured Personnel Carrier
- FV311 — Armoured Load Carrier
