= Barrack Road drill hall =

Military installation in Newcastle upon Tyne

- Newcastle upon Tyne
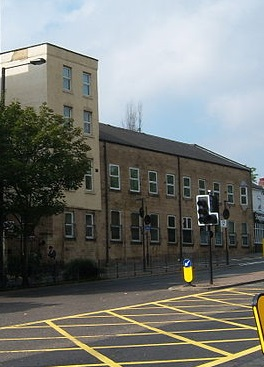
- Barrack Road drill hall

Site information
- Type: Drill Hall

Location
- Location within Tyne and Wear
- Coordinates: 54.97520°N 1.62529°W

Site history
- Built: c.1890
- Built for: War Office
- In use: c.1890-c.1980

The Barrack Road drill hall is a former military installation in Newcastle upon Tyne

== History ==
The drill hall was designed as the headquarters of the 1st Northumberland Artillery Volunteers and was completed around 1890. The site also accommodated a riding school and stabling for 14 horses. With the formation of the Territorial Force in 1908, the drill hall became the home of the 1st Northumbrian Brigade, Royal Field Artillery as well as two of its three batteries (the third was at Elswick Ordnance Works in Dunn Street). The brigade was mobilised at the drill hall in August 1914 and, after being deployed to France and being re-designated 250 Brigade in May 1916, it saw action at the Battle of Flers–Courcelette in September 1916, the Battle of Morval also in September 1916 and the Battle of Le Transloy in October 1916.

After the First World War the drill hall became home of 72 (Northumbrian) Regiment Royal Artillery, a formation which evolved after the Second World War to become 272 (Northumbrian) Regiment Royal Artillery. On the restructuring of the Territorial Army in April 1967, the drill hall became the home of 101st (Northumbrian) Regiment Royal Artillery. The drill hall was converted for residential use in the early 1980s and the building is now known as Barrack Court.
