= Batham =

Batham is a surname. Notable people with the surname include:

- Betty Batham (1917–1974), New Zealand marine biologist
- Rahul Batham (born 1992), Indian cricketer
- Vimla Batham (born 1951), Indian politician

== See also ==
- Batham Gate, a Roman road in England
- Daniel Batham and Son, a brewery in England
