= Asbury mechanism =

Naval artillery device

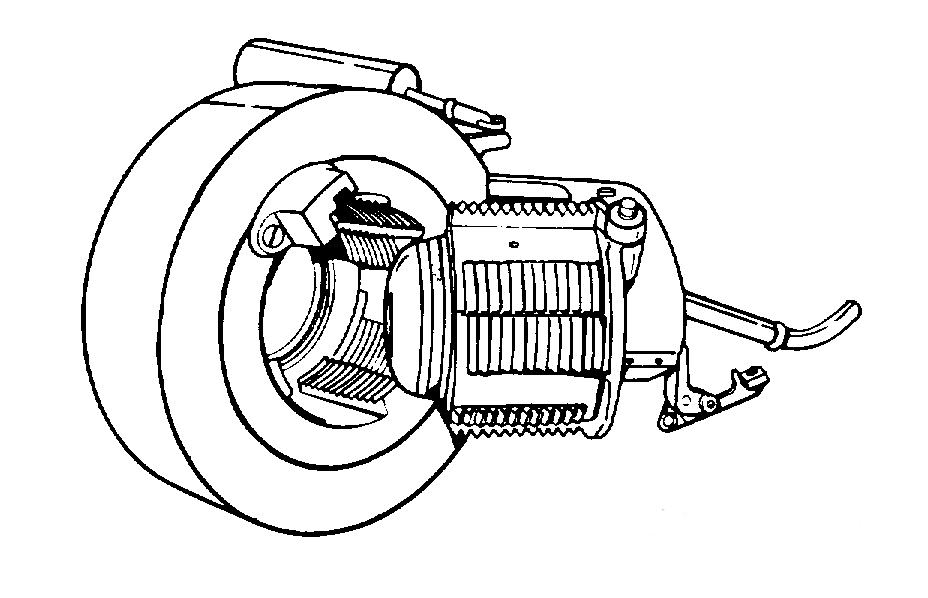
The Asbury mechanism lever at the far right enabled a member of the reloading crew to open or close the breech in a smooth single motion.

An Asbury Mechanism opens and closes the breech of heavy artillery for reloading with a projectile and bags of propellant. It was widely used for naval artillery of the world wars and similar coastal artillery and railway guns. The device was invented at the Washington Navy Yard in 1916 by draftsman Dorsey Frost Asbury. It is sometimes called a Smith-Asbury mechanism by the United States Navy in recognition of Asbury's supervisor, Lieutenant Commander George Leonard Smith, USN.

Large caliber breech-loading artillery became practical with French development of the obturator by Charles Ragon de Bange in 1872; and speed of reloading was improved by adaptation of the interrupted screw breech plug, which was later further improved by Axel Welin in 1890 as the Welin screw breech and adopted by the Swedish. Asbury used gearing to fully open a Welin breech by linking the unscrewing, withdrawing and swinging clear movements into one continuous action.

== Sources ==
- U.S. patent 1185964A
