= BL 5.5-inch medium gun =

BL 5.5 inch medium gun Mk 3
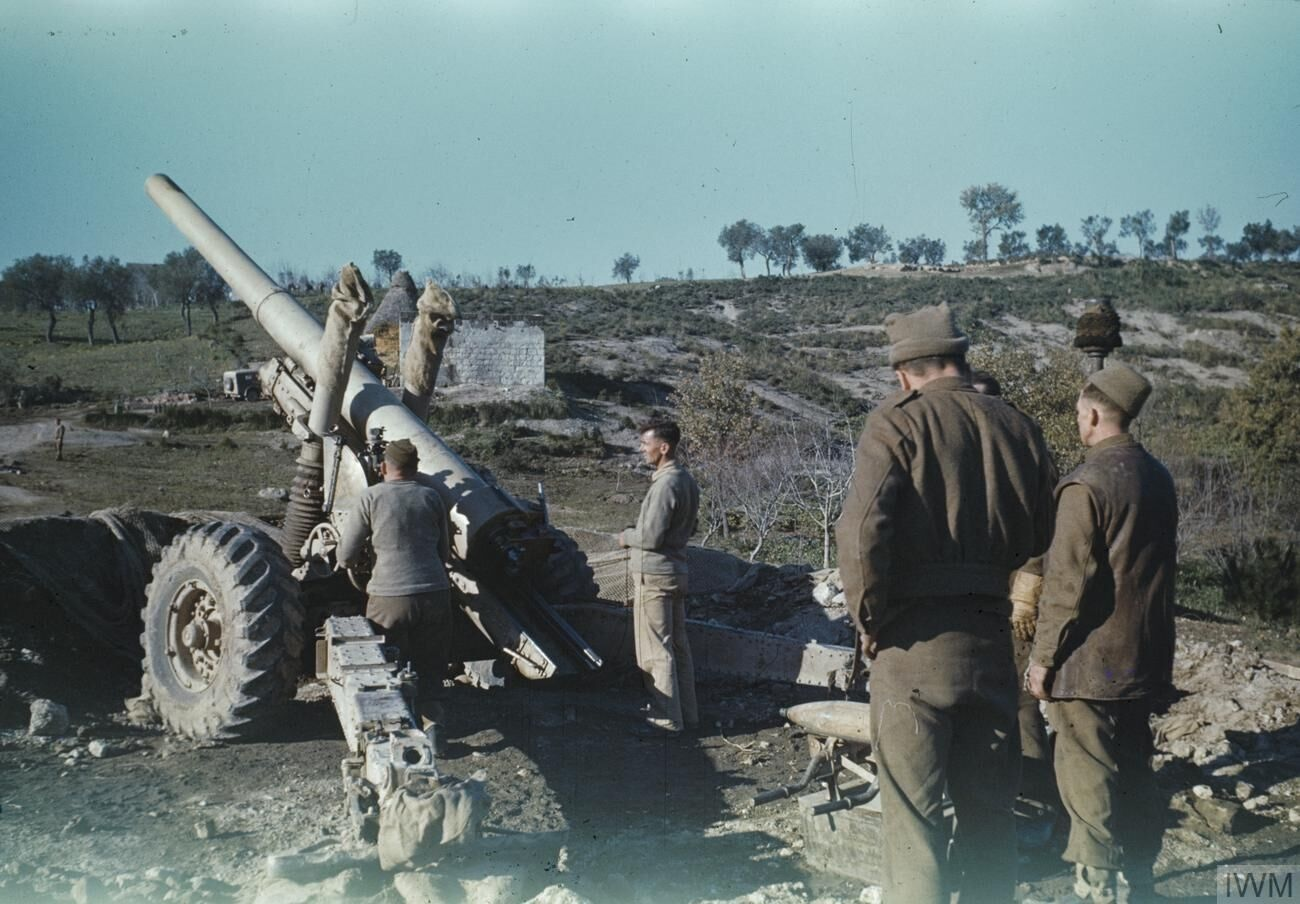
- A 5.5 Inch Gun Crew on the Italian Front, 10 January 1944.
- Type: Medium gun
- Place of origin: United Kingdom

Service history
- In service: 1941–1980 (UK)
- Used by: See users
- Wars: World War II; Korean War; Portuguese Colonial War; Rhodesian Bush War; South African Border War; Iran–Iraq War

Production history
- Produced: 1941-1945
- No. built: 5,000

Specifications
- Mass: 13,647 lbs (6,190 kg)
- Length: 24 ft 7 in (7.5 m)
- Barrel length: 13 ft 9 in (4.19 m) L/30
- Width: 8 ft 4 in (2.54 m)
- Height: 8 ft 6 in (2.6 m)
- Crew: 10
- Shell: Separate loading bagged charge and projectile
- Calibre: 5.5 inch (140 mm)
- Breech: Welin breech and Asbury mechanism
- Recoil: Hydro-pneumatic
- Carriage: Split trail
- Elevation: -5° to 45°
- Traverse: 30° left and right
- Rate of fire: 2 rpm
- Muzzle velocity: 100lb shell (45 kg): 1,675 ft/s (511 m/s); 82lb shell (37 kg): 1,950 ft/s (590 m/s)
- Maximum firing range: 100lb shell: 16,200 yards (14,800 m); 82lb shell: 18,100 yards (16,600 m)
- Sights: Probert pattern reciprocating and calibrating

The BL 5.5-inch gun was a British artillery gun introduced during the Second World War to equip medium batteries.

== History ==
In January 1939 a specification was issued for a gun no heavier than 5.5 tons to replace the 6 inch 26 cwt howitzers in use with most medium batteries. For the desired range of 16,000 yards (15 km) ballistic studies recommended making a new calibre of 5.5 inches. The Asbury interrupted screw breechblock initially featured a semi-automatic firing mechanism used on naval guns, which often malfunctioned in the field and thus had to be replaced with a simpler design from WWI field artillery, while the complex hydropneumatic equilibrators had to be swapped for heavier but cheaper and less finicky spring ones.

The first units were equipped in UK in the summer of 1941 and in North Africa a year later, 20 guns equipped British and Free French batteries at El Alamein. Subsequently, it also equipped Canadian, Australian, South African, Polish and Indian regiments, and after the war, it was also used by New Zealand. In the Second World War the normal organization was a regiment of 16 guns organized into two batteries. The 5.5 was retained in service after the war. It was used by the Royal Artillery on operations in Korea, South Arabia and Borneo. It was probably used by the Indian Army in wars against Pakistan, and was used by the Pakistan Army against India in the mountains of Kashmir during the Kargil War of 1999.

The South African Defence Force used it extensively in the early stages of the South African Border War, including Operation Savannah, calling it the G2. Approximately 72 are still held in reserve by the South African Army. In British post-war service it also replaced the BL 4.5-inch medium field gun. When 6-gun batteries were introduced in the late 1950s, medium regiments had 18 guns and the third battery in each field regiment was equipped with 5.5 inch guns instead of 25-pounder guns. It remained in UK service with Territorial Army regiments until 1980 and in Australian service until replaced by the M198 in about 1984.

The UK replacement for 5.5 inch was the FH-70 155 mm towed howitzer, in service as the L121. The last 5.5 rounds were fired in the UK in 1995.

In use, the 5.5 was generally towed by the AEC Matador artillery tractor. From the 1950s in British service, the 5.5 was typically towed by an AEC Militant Mk 1 6x6 truck and subsequently the FV 1103 Leyland Martian 6x6 Medium Artillery Tractor.

All 5.5-inch guns were manufactured in the UK.

Production by year
Pre-War	Sep–Dec 1939	1940	1941	1942	1943	1944	1945
3	2	-	177	221	908	295	73

== Description ==
There were four marks of 5.5 inch ordnance, three of which entered service during World War II and the fourth after; differences between them were only minor. There were two marks of carriage where the differences were greater use of welding and less of riveting. The carriages were identical to those used with Ordnance BL 4.5 inch Mark 2. No limber was ever used and the gun fired with its wheels in contact with the ground.

Figures for the weight of the gun differ between sources: Ian Hogg states "total weight in action" of 13,646 pounds (6.190 t), Nigel Evans mentions "basic weight" of 5.3 unspecified "tons", and a WWII US manual claims 12,678 pounds (5.751 t)

During World War II the PL Locks and AC Slide Boxes (a component separate to the gun attached to the bottom and face of the breech block using a rifle-calibre tube insert to initiate firing of the bagged charge) utilising 0.5 inch (12.7 mm) tubes were replaced by PK Locks and Y Slide Boxes using 0.303 inch (7.7 mm) tubes.

It used one man laying and had Probert pattern calibrating sights. The dial sight was initially the No 7 but was gradually replaced by the No 9. In the 1960s sights were converted from degrees, minutes and yards to mils and metres. There was no anti-tank telescope. Late in the war a sight adapter was introduced to permit upper register (high angle) fire when the wheels were raised significantly above the level of the spades.

The normal gun detachment was 10 men.

== Ammunition ==
Initially, the 5.5 inch gun fired a 100-pound (45 kg) shell, using four charges in two cartridges to give a maximum range table muzzle velocity of 1,675 feet per second (511 m/s) and a maximum range of 16,200 yards (14,800 m).

In 1944 an 82-pound (37 kg) shell was introduced along with Charge Super giving a maximum muzzle velocity of 1,950 feet per second (590 m/s) and a range of 18,100 yards (16,600 m) yards. The new lighter shell contained 1.5 pounds (0.68 kg) more explosive and gradually replaced the older, heavier shell.

In addition to high explosive rounds, there were several types of chemical shells weighing between 90 and 98 pounds (41 and 44 kg) and 100-pound (45 kg) coloured smoke shells; coloured flare shells were also developed. After World War 2, only HE was used. There was no AP (armour-piercing) round for the gun but, in an emergency, gunners were taught to remove the impact fuze and fire the unfused high explosive as an AP substitute.

The normal HE fuze was No 117, a percussion, impact fuze that was introduced in 1920 and saw use until the 1960s. In late 1944, the T100 proximity fuze became available.

== Variants ==
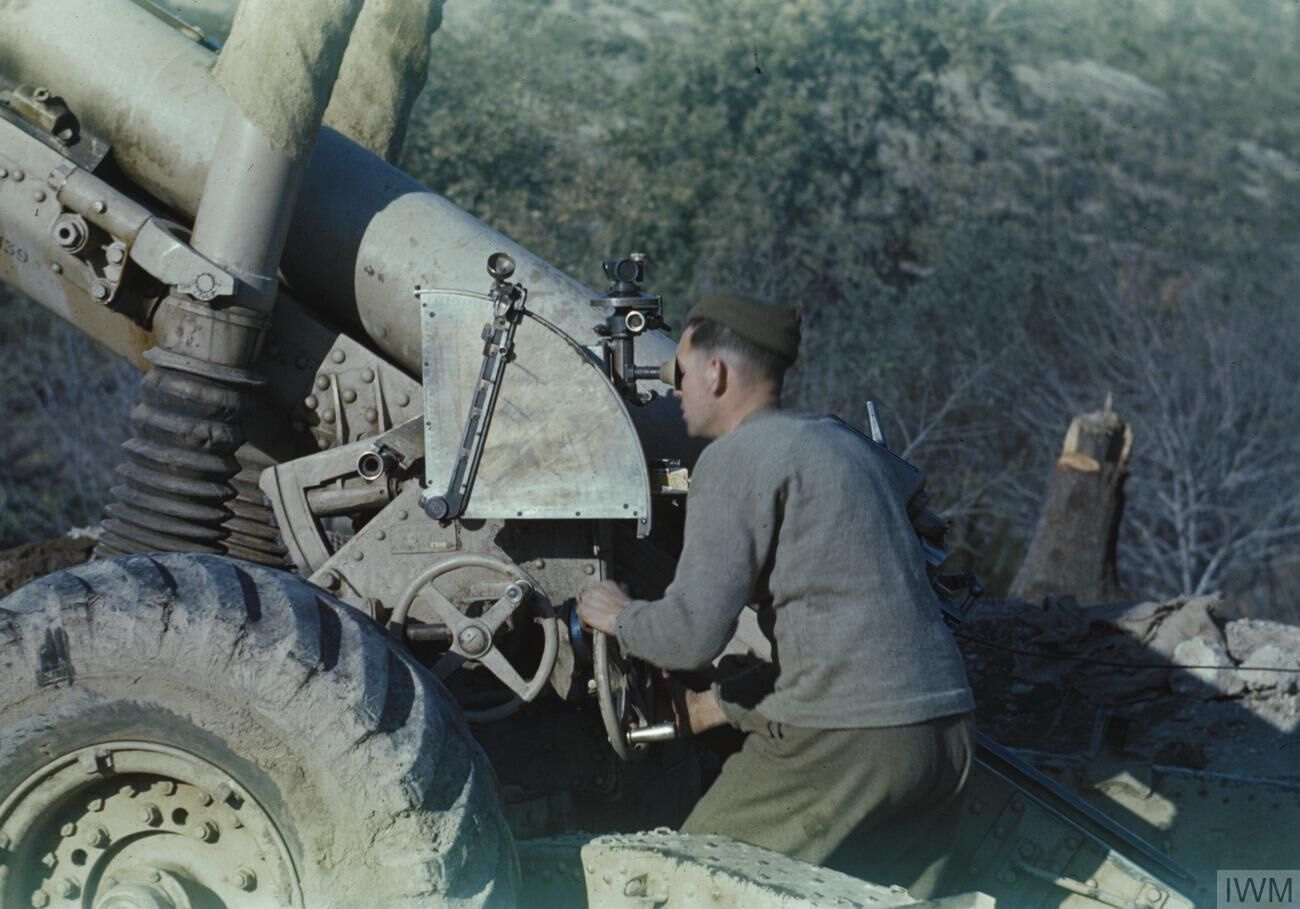
A British gunner uses the dial sight and range scale plate of a 5.5-inch gun in 1944.

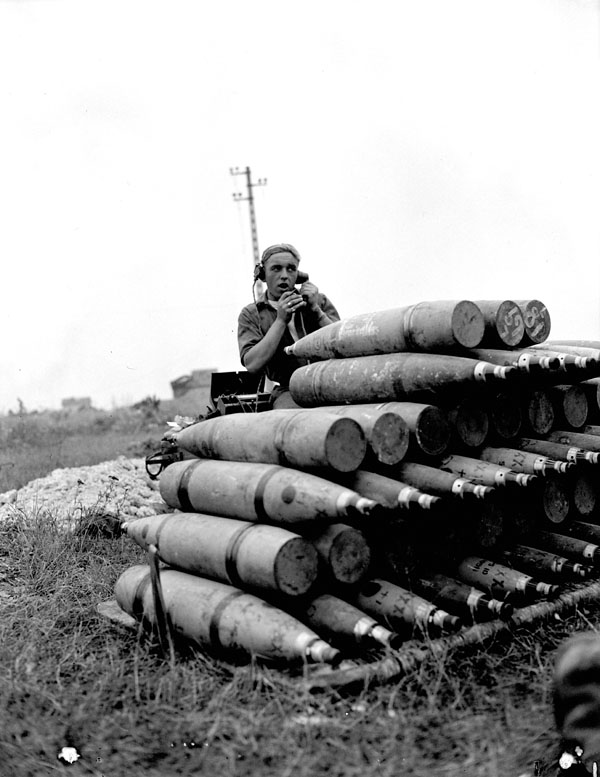
Canadian signaler with shells during a shoot, France July 1944.

No variants entered service although the UK developed two self-propelled versions to prototype stage. The first in 1945 used the Crusader gun tractor (developed from the Crusader tank to tow 17-pounder anti-tank guns). It was a turretless design with no casemate.

The second, FV3805, in the 1950s used a Centurion tank carriage, the gun being in a barbette mounting in a fully enclosed casemate. The chassis was reversed, with the enclosed fighting compartment at the rear and the engine, previously at the rear, now at the front. Two prototypes were built, one of which survives and is being restored.

The FV300 Series was intended to include a 5.5-inch self-propelled, the FV305. However, it was cancelled before a prototype could be built.

== Users ==
- Australia
- Burma
- Canada
- Finland
- France
- India
- Iraq
- Italy
- Malaysia
- Namibia
- New Zealand
- Oman
- Pakistan
- Poland
- Portugal
- Rhodesia
- South Africa
- United Kingdom

== Surviving examples ==
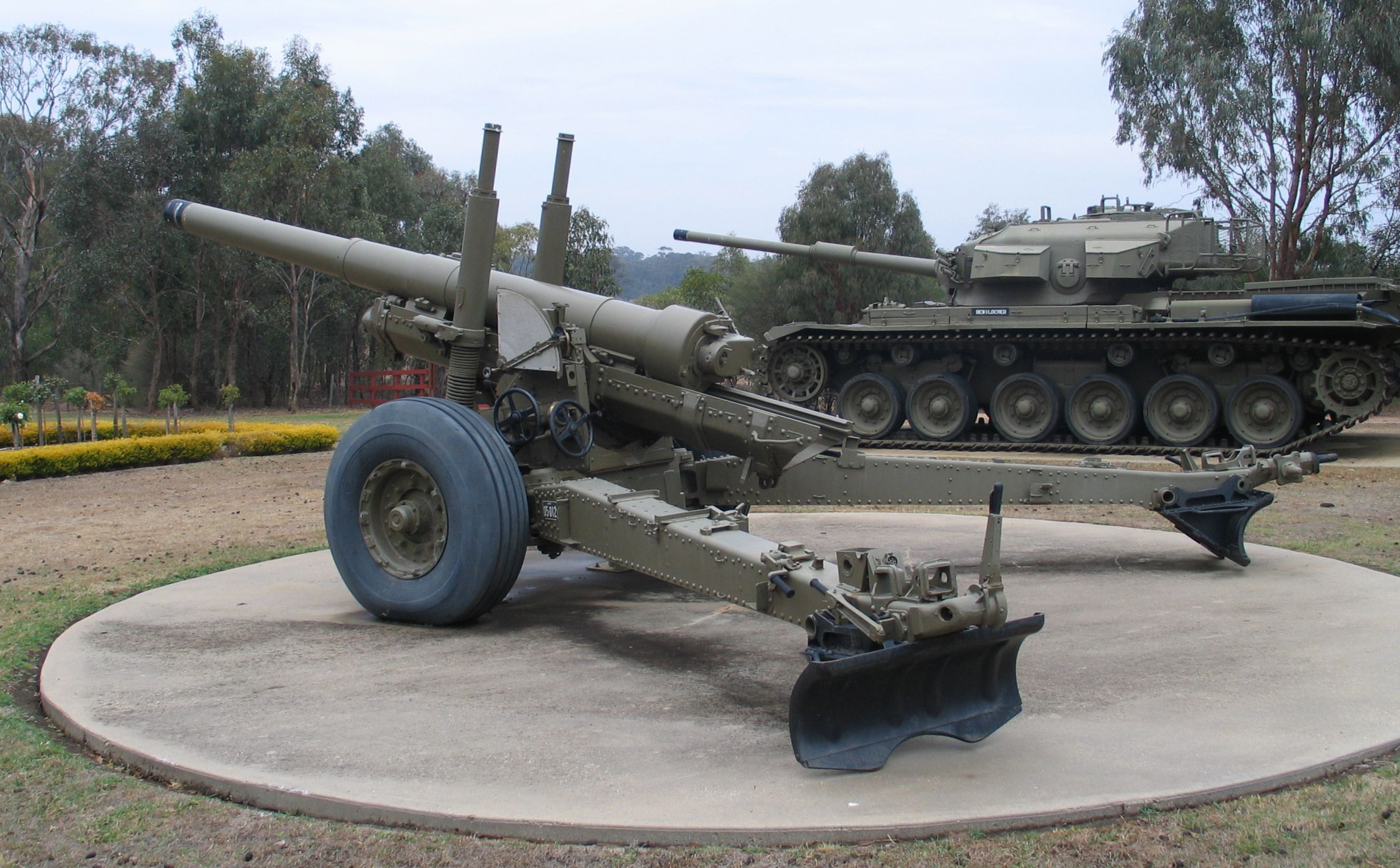
Side of BL 5.5 inch Mk3 at Puckapunyal.

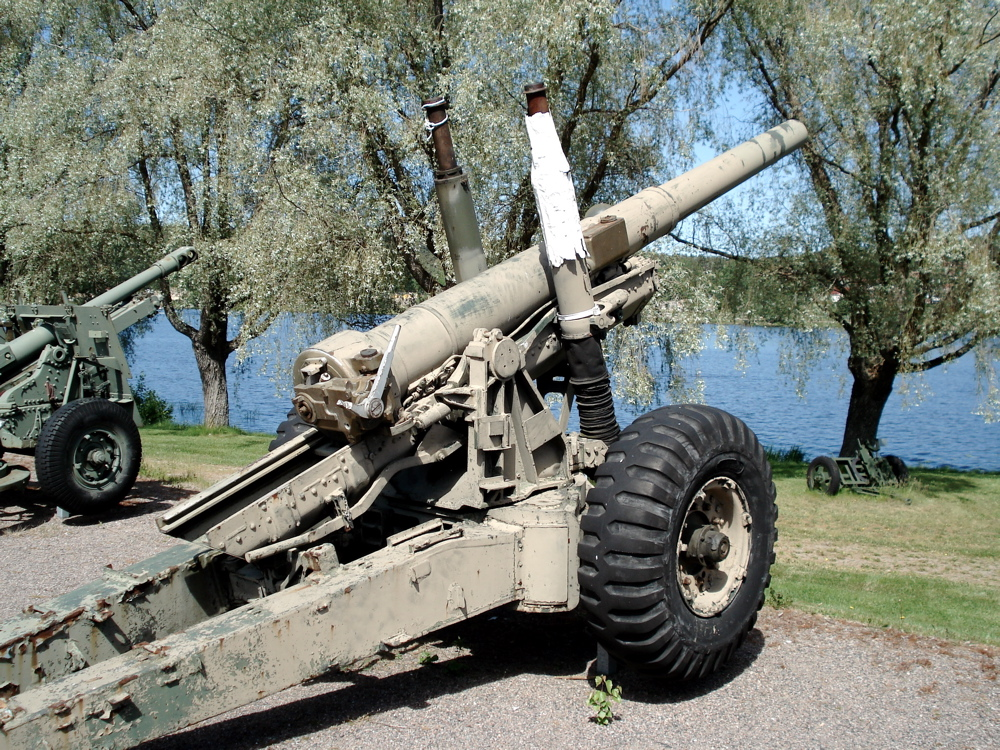
Back of British Ordnance BL 5.5 inch (140 mm) M3 medium gun from year 1939, displayed in Hämeenlinna Artillery Museum. The Finnish designation is 140 KH 39 E (140 mm, cannon-howitzer, model 1939, English)

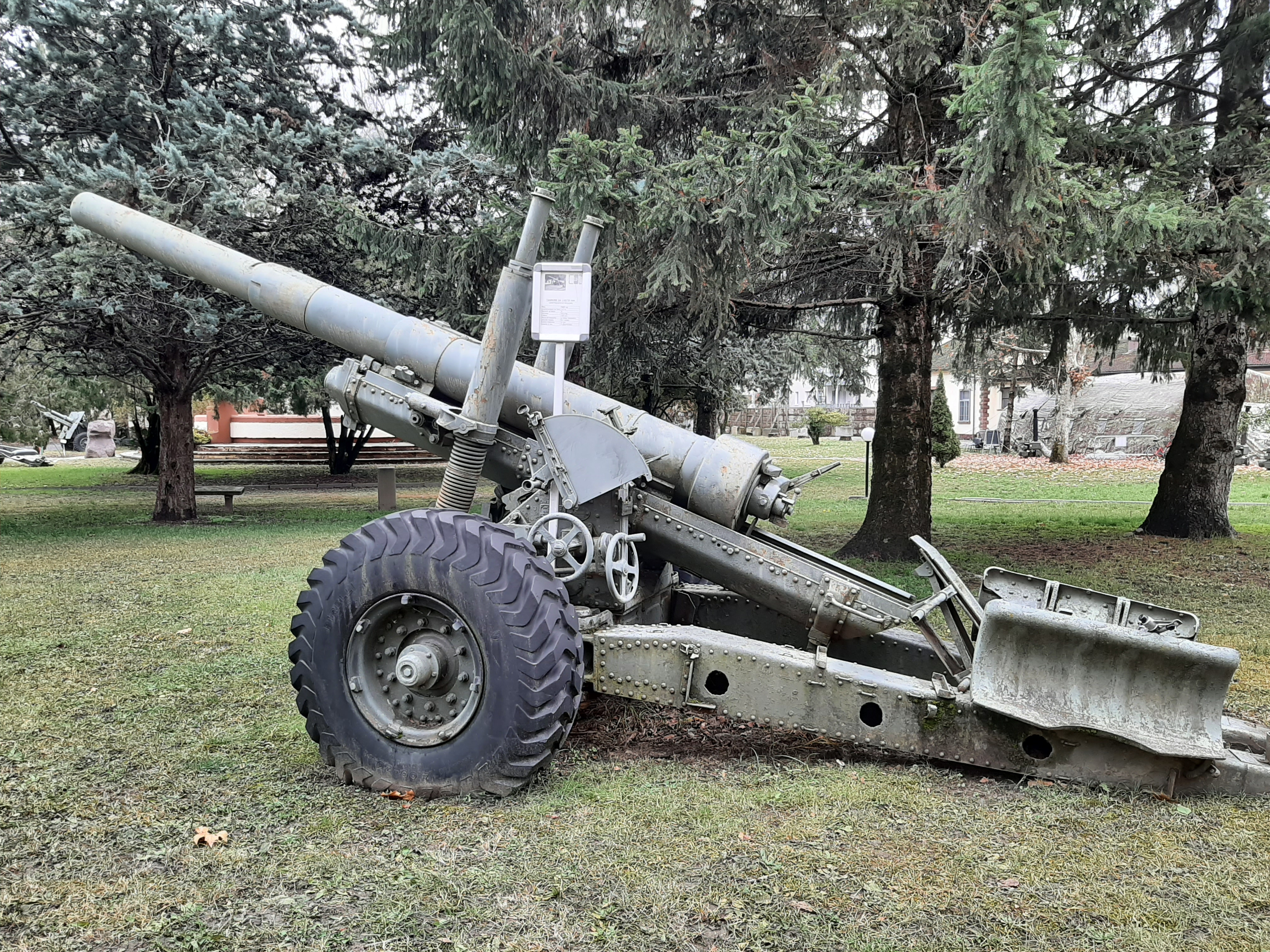
A BL 5.5 at the base of the Italian Army's 5th Mountain Artillery Regiment

- Australia
  - Fort Lytton Military Museum, Brisbane.
  - National Military Vehicle Museum Edinburgh, South Australia.
- Finland
  - Museo Militaria, Hämeenlinna
- France
  - Arromanches-les-Bains, Normandy − Musee du Debarquement.
  - Ranville, Normandy − Memorial Pegasus.
  - Falaise − Memorial des civils dans la guerre.
- India
  - Southern Command Hospital, Pune.
  - Regiment of Artillery Museum, Nashik Road.
- Italy
  - Caserma "Cesare Battisti", in Meran.
- Namibia
  - Namibian Army's 4 Artillery Brigade still operationally fields the guns.
- Netherlands
  - Overloon War Museum.
- New Zealand
  - National Army Museum, Waiouru.
- United Kingdom
  - Royal Artillery Museum.
  - Shropshire Regiment Museum, Shrewsbury Castle.
  - Three guns displayed on a roundabout adjacent to MoD Donnington, Telford.
- Imperial War Museum Duxford.
  - Outside 47 Regt Royal Artillery lines Larkhill.
  - Outside 203 (Elswick) Battery Royal Artillery lines, Blyth, Northumberland.
  - Newhaven Fort.

== See also ==
- 155 mm Howitzer M1 US equivalent
- 15 cm sFH 18 German equivalent, shorter ranged
- Skoda K-series Czech equivalent, widely used by Germany
