= 269 (West Riding) Battery Royal Artillery =

British Army reserve artillery battery

269 (West Riding) Battery RA
- Badge of 269 (West Riding) Battery
- Active: 1 April 1975-
- Country: United Kingdom
- Branch: British Army
- Type: Army Reserve
- Role: Precision fire
- Size: 1 Battery (Company strength)
- Part of: 101st (Northumbrian) Regiment Royal Artillery
- Garrison/HQ: Carlton Barracks, Leeds
- Nickname: The West Riding Gunners
- Motto: Semper vigilantes (Always vigilant) (Latin)
- Colors: Yellow, white, and blue
- March: British Grenadiers
- Anniversaries: Yorkshire Day (1 August); St Barbara's Day (4 December)
- Equipment: Guided Multiple Launch Rocket System
- Engagements: Bosnia, Kosovo, Cyprus, Iraq, Afghanistan Operation TELIC, Operation HERRICK

Commanders
- Battery Commander: Maj James Parker RA

Insignia
- Tactical Recognition Flash

269 (West Riding) Battery Royal Artillery is part of 101st (Northumbrian) Regiment Royal Artillery, an artillery regiment of the British Army. The unit is based in Carlton Barracks, Leeds.

== History ==
The battery was formed as 269 (West Riding) Observation Post Battery Royal Artillery (Volunteers) in April 1975 at Leeds from a cadre of the West Riding Regiment RA (Territorials). Its role was to provide observation teams to support 1st Armoured Division and 2nd Armoured Division in Germany. In 1989, the battery re-roled to the 105 mm light gun and in 1993 it joined 19th Regiment Royal Artillery, a regular regiment in 24 Airmobile Brigade.

In July 1999, the battery re-roled as an air defence battery equipped with the Rapier surface-to-air missile system within 106th (Yeomanry) Regiment Royal Artillery. In 2006 it transferred to 101st (Northumbrian) Regiment Royal Artillery where it was given a surveillance and target acquisition role.

In February 2019, Sergeant Benjamin Boocock, the last surviving member of the West Riding Artillery to have survived the Second World War, was buried with full military honours at St John the Baptist Church, Adel in a ceremony organised by the battery.

Under Army 2020, the battery re-roled to the M270 Multiple Launch Rocket System.

== Publications ==
- Litchfield, Norman E. H., 1992. The Territorial Artillery 1908-1988, The Sherwood Press, Nottingham. ISBN 0-9508205-2-0
