= FH70 =

British/German/Italian 155 mm towed howitzer

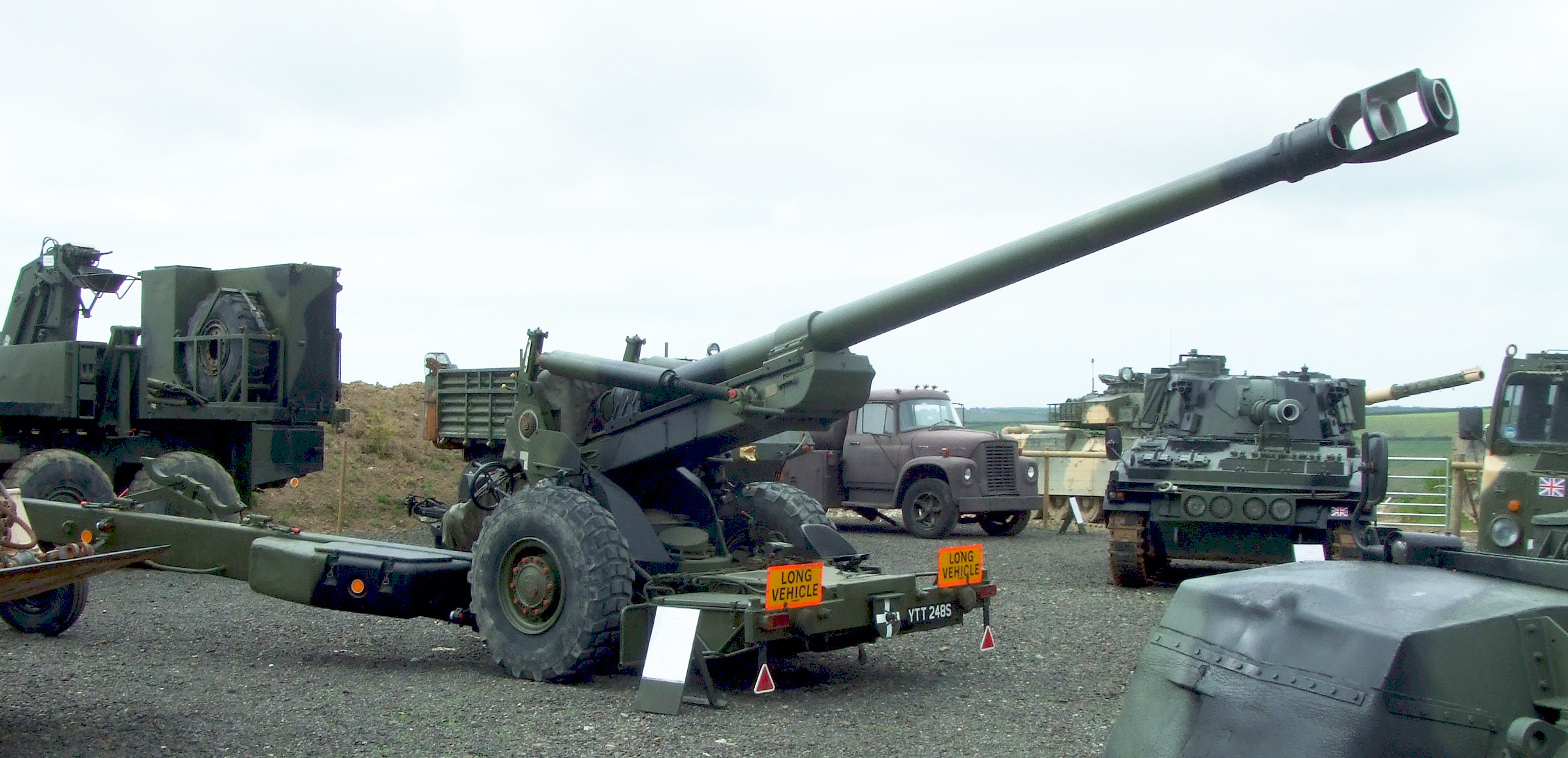
- FH70 howitzer in North Cornwall Tank Museum Collection.
- Type: Howitzer
- Place of origin: United Kingdom, West Germany & Italy

Service history
- In service: 1978–present
- Used by: see "Operators"
- Wars: Lebanese Civil War; Russo-Ukrainian War

Production history
- Designed: 1968–1973
- Manufacturer: VSEL, Rheinmetall, OTO Melara, Japan Steel Works (licensed production)
- Produced: 1976

Specifications
- Mass: 9.3 t (9.2 long tons; 10.3 short tons)
- Length: 12.43 m (40 ft 9 in) firing; 9.8 m (32 ft 2 in) travelling
- Barrel length: 6.022 m (19 ft 9.1 in) L/39
- Width: 7.5 m (24 ft 7 in) firing; 2.58 m (8 ft 6 in) travelling
- Height: 2.192 m (7 ft 2.3 in) firing (no elevation); 2.45 m (8.0 ft) travelling
- Crew: 8
- Shell: L15A1 HE (standard)
- Shell weight: 43.4 kg (96 lb)
- Calibre: 155 mm (6.1 in)
- Breech: Semi-automatic vertically sliding block and automatic loader
- Recoil: Buffer with high-angle cut-off gear and a recuperator
- Carriage: Split trails with APU
- Elevation: +70° (1244mils)/-4.5° (-80mils)
- Traverse: 56° (996mils)
- Rate of fire: 2 rounds/min sustained; 6 rounds/min rapid
- Muzzle velocity: 213–827 m/s (700–2,710 ft/s)
- Maximum firing range: 24.7 km (15.3 mi) L15A1; 31.5 km (19.6 mi) RAP
- Sights: Quadrant elevation scale and levelling bubbles, a periscopic dial sight, and a direct fire telescope
- References: Janes

The FH70 (field howitzer for the 1970s) is a towed 155 mm howitzer used by several nations.

== History ==
In 1963, NATO agreed a NATO Basic Military Requirement 39 for close support artillery, either towed or tracked. Subsequently, Germany and UK started discussions and design studies and in 1968 established agreed operational characteristics for a towed 155 mm close support gun. Italy became a party to the agreement in 1970.

Key requirements were:

- A detachable auxiliary power unit (APU)
- An unassisted range of 24 kilometres (15 mi); an assisted range of 30 kilometres (19 mi)
- A burst capability of three rounds in 15–20 seconds, six rounds per minute for a short period and two rounds per minute sustained
- The ability to fire all 155 mm munitions in NATO service, plus a new range of ammunition

The two national authorities had overall responsibility for R&D, and Vickers Ltd was the co-ordinating design authority. They were also the design authority for the carriage and Rheinmetall GmbH was the authority for the elevating mass, including the sights, and for the APU. There was a further breakdown at a more detailed level and production worksharing. The UK Royal Armament Research and Development Establishment (RARDE) was responsible for designing the HE projectile and the charge system. Germany was responsible for Smoke, Illuminating, Minelet and extended range HE, although the development of the last two was not completed in the programme.

The intention was for FH70 to replace the US-built M114 155 mm howitzer and equip general support battalions in German divisional artillery regiments and to equip three British general support medium regiments replacing the 140mm 5.5-inch Medium Gun. In the event, it actually equipped UK regular regiments in direct support of infantry brigades until after the end of the Cold War, and only replaced the 105mm L118 light gun in two TA regiments, 100th (Yeomanry) Regiment Royal Artillery and 101st (Northumbrian) Regiment Royal Artillery from 1992 to 1999.

Following the full-scale invasion of Ukraine by Russia in 2022, a number of European countries made donations of FH70 units to Ukraine. Italy donated an unspecified number from their inventory of approximately 190 units. These were in service in Ukraine by May 2022. In January 2023 Estonia announced that it would donate its entire stock of FH70 artillery to Ukraine.

== Design ==
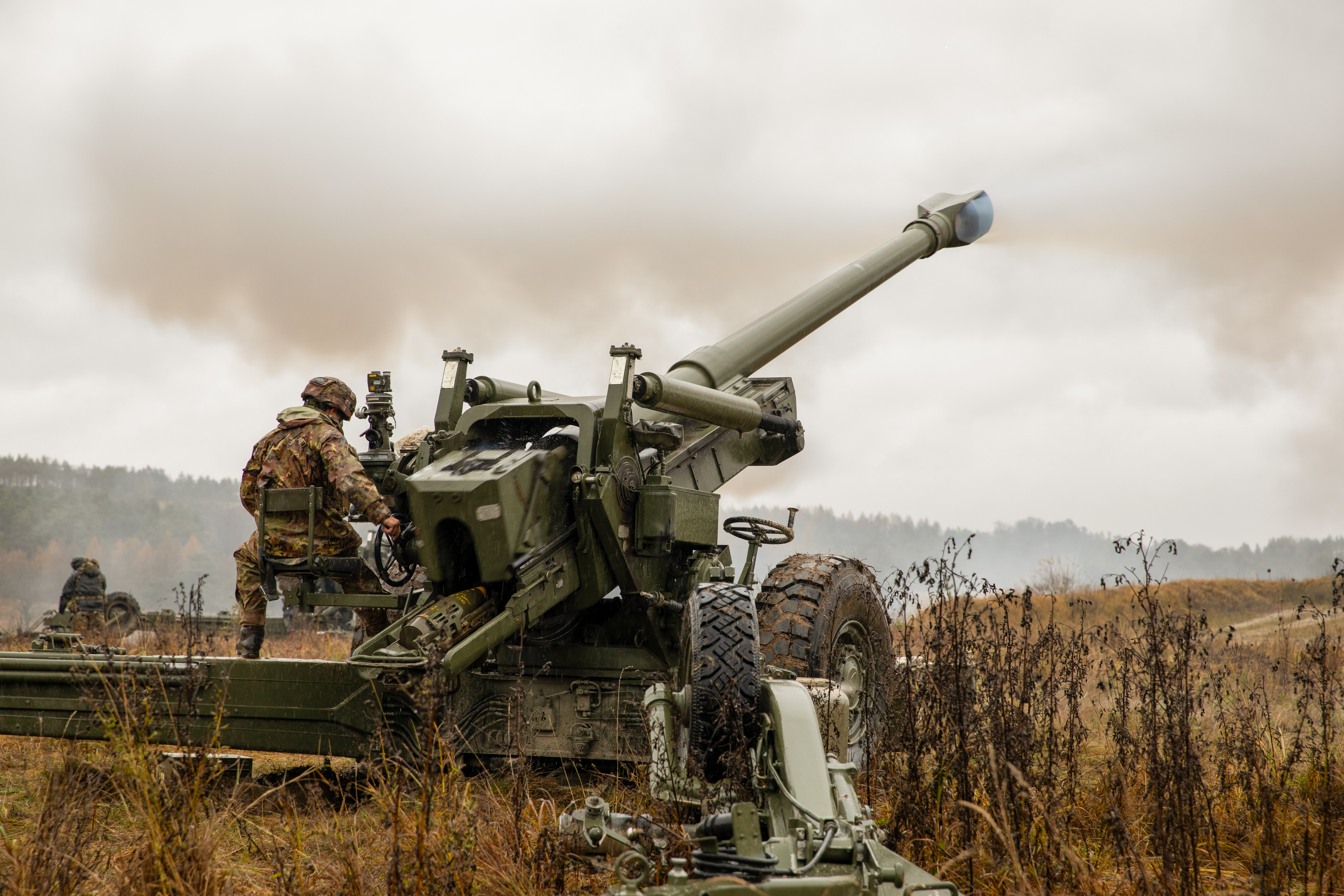
Italian soldiers firing an FH70 howitzer

FH70 features included:

- a vertical sliding-block breech that provided obturation and held a primer magazine containing 12 primers (a similar breech was fitted to German M109G)
- burst fire
- an on-board 1700 cc Volkswagen engine to power the hydraulics and to assist bringing the gun into and out of action (with hand pump back-up) and to move the gun up to 20 kilometres (12 mi) at low speed without towing by an artillery tractor
- electronic firing data display taking data from the otherwise conventional azimuth and elevation sights.

The barrel was 39 calibres long, giving 827 m/s standard maximum muzzle velocity. It had a muzzle brake giving 32% efficiency.

Other conventional features included a split trail and turntable sole plate. Initially, it had assisted loading but became an early user of flick-ramming. In accordance with long-standing UK practice, it used one-man laying. All this meant that the gun could be operated by a minimum detachment of only four men (commander, layer and two loaders). The burst fire rate was three rounds in 15 seconds. It was also fitted with a direct fire telescope.

There were a number of design flaws that became apparent in service. The equipment entered full operational service in the UK in 1980. It became clear that there were significant difficulties with the tube feed system in anything but ideal conditions. 1st Regiment RHA, a unit that had conducted the Troop trials, developed their own procedures to solve these problems, related to dust contamination, and this process became established in official manuals in due course. More significantly, the trails of the gun proved to be weak at the point where maximum stress was incurred when the equipment was towed; this resulted in modification work on the UK guns in 1987. There were continual problems with the drive train on the flat-4 VW APU, and the hydraulic system was always vulnerable to the obvious problems posed by external, non-armoured, housing in combat conditions. In addition, the complex dial sight carrier was vulnerable to damage.

== Ammunition ==
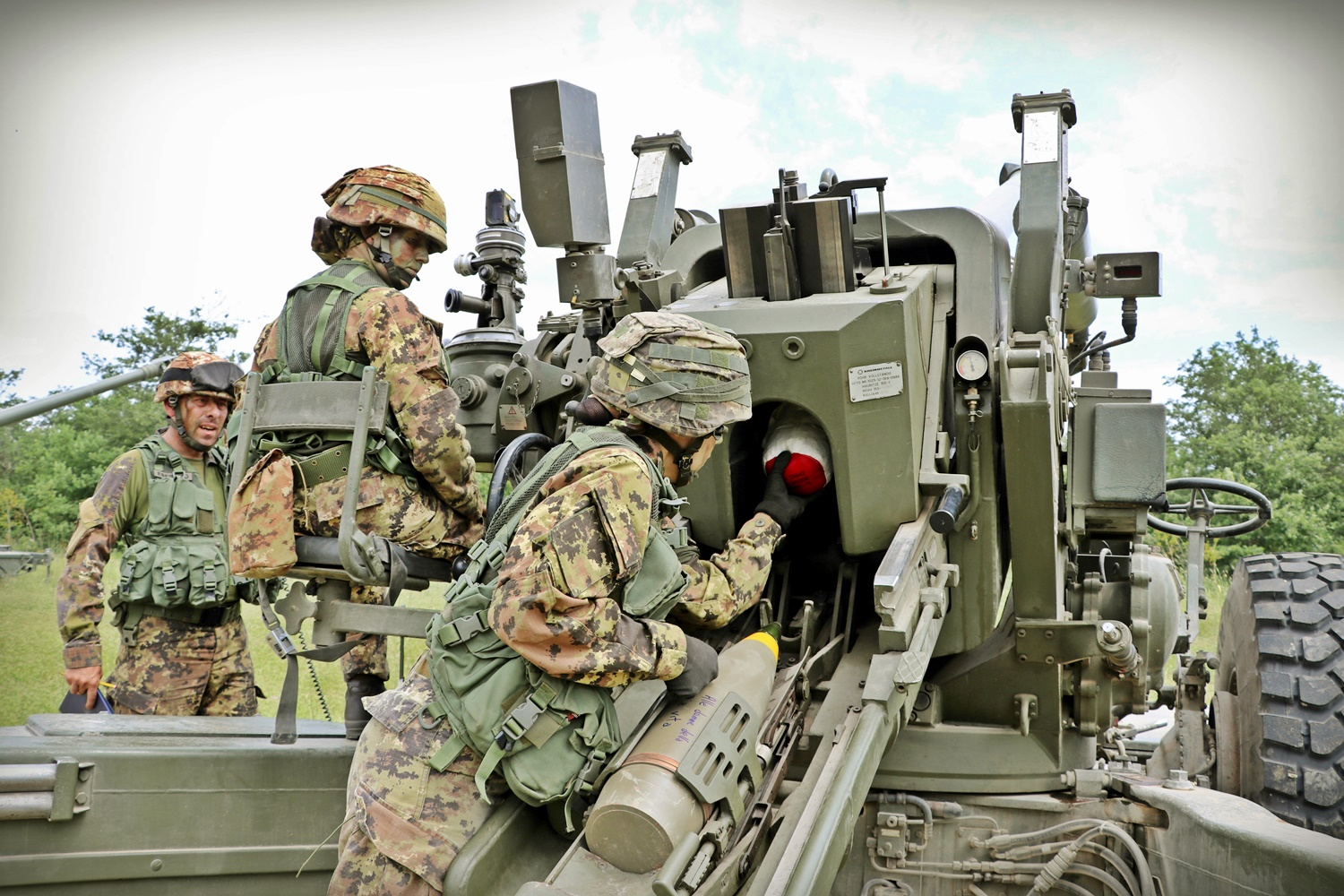
Italian Army 1st Field Artillery Regiment (Mountain) troops loading an FH70 howitzer, 2019

The new projectiles conformed to the Quadrilateral Ballistics Agreement between the US, UK, Germany and Italy. In essence, this meant a shell with the same shape and dimensions as the US M549 rocket-assisted projectile. The standard HE shell (UK designation L15) is a thin wall design weighing 43.5 kilograms (96 lb) and containing 11.3 kilograms (25 lb) of HE. This remains the largest HE load for a standard 155mm shell.

The propellant system comprises three bagged cartridges with triple-base propellant. Cartridge 1 gives charges 1 & 2, Cartridge 2 give charges 3–7 and Cartridge 3 is charge 8, which gives a maximum range under standard conditions of 24.7 kilometres (15.3 mi).

Each nation developed its own fuzes and ammunition packaging. In Britain, this led to the Unit Load Container carrying 17 complete rounds, including shells with fuzes fitted - a novelty for 155 mm.

Standard US pattern 155 mm ammunition can also be fired, although US primers proved difficult for the primer magazine and feed due to their variation in size.

== Operators ==
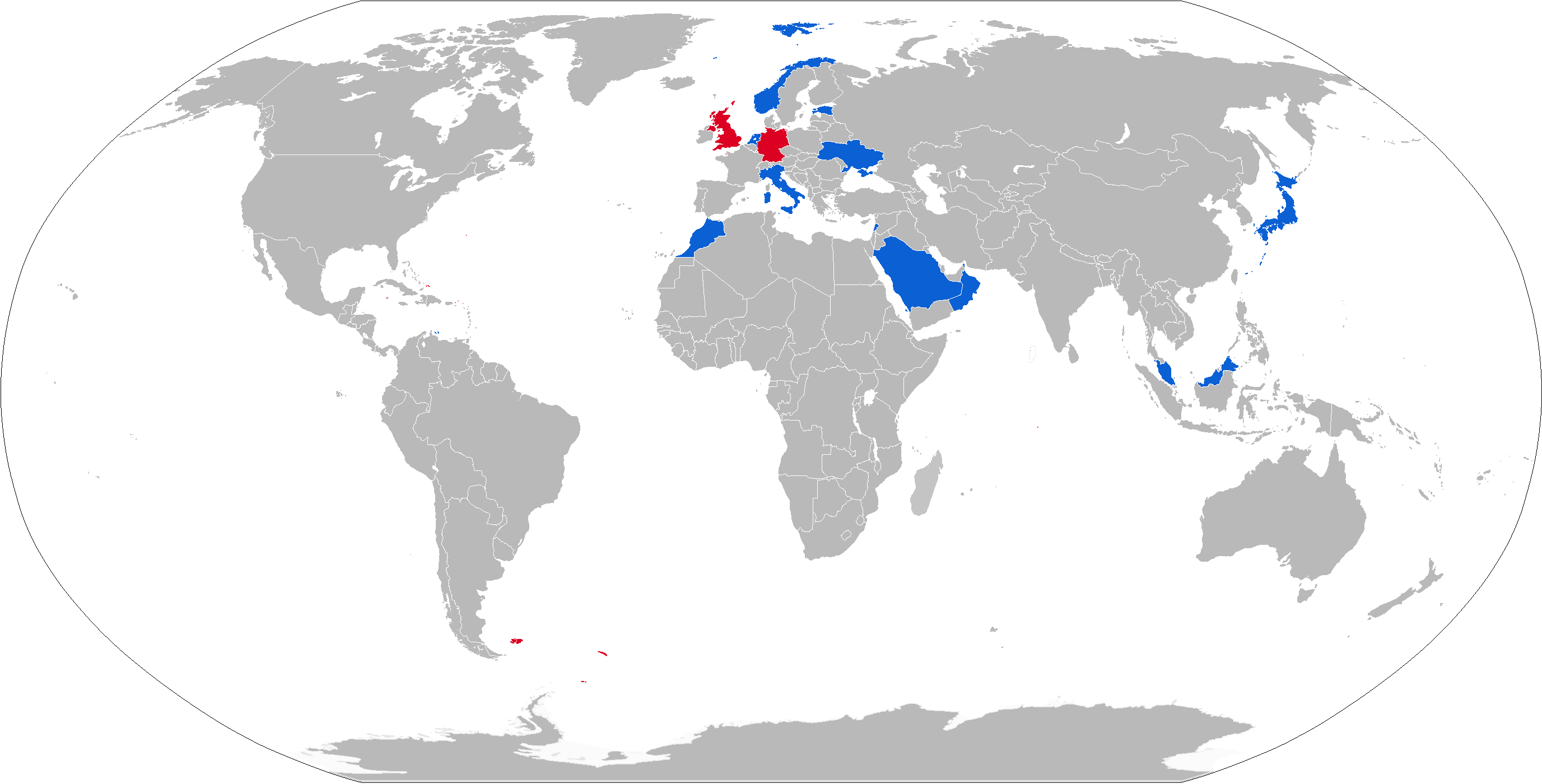
Operators of the FH70 Current Former

=== Current operators ===
- Italy – 90 in service of 162 ordered
- Japan – 480 built under license with the ordnance by Japan Steel Works
- Lebanon – unknown number in service
- Morocco – 30
- Oman – 12
- Saudi Arabia – 72
- Ukraine – 34 after 10 transferred from Italy and 24 from Estonia

=== Former operators ===
- Estonia – 24 (all units transferred to Ukraine)
- Germany – 150 as FH155-1 (Field Howitzer 155mm Mk1), last unit (225th Mountain Artillery Battalion) converted to tracked artillery in 2002
- Malaysia – 15 units
- Netherlands – 15 in wartime reserve
- United Kingdom – 67 (as Howitzer 155mm L121 with Ordnance 155mm L22 on Carriage 155mm L13 in Territorial Army service until 1999)

== See also ==
- List of howitzers
- List of weapons of the Lebanese Civil War

Howitzers of similar caliber, role, era, and capability

- 2A36 Giatsint-B – Soviet 152 mm towed field gun
- M198 howitzer – American 155 mm towed howitzer
- TRF1 – French towed howitzer
- Haubits FH77 – Swedish 155 mm towed howitzer
- KH179 – South Korean 155 mm towed howitzer
- Santa Bárbara Sistemas 155/52 – Spanish 155 mm towed howitzer

== Sources ==
- RB Pengelley, FH70 - Europe's first multi-national artillery program, International Defense Review Vol 6, No 2 April 1973.
