= Range table =

Table of angles used for artillery

A range table was a list of angles of elevation a particular artillery gun barrel needed to be set to, to strike a target at a particular distance with a projectile of a particular weight using a propellant cartridge of a particular weight. They were used for several centuries by field and naval gunners of all countries until gradually replaced by computerised fire-control systems beginning in World War II (1939–1945).

== Range table for US 3-inch (76.2 mm) field gun, models 1902-1905 ==
This gun used a standard "fixed" cartridge with 15 lb (6.8 kg) shell, hence a single set of tables applied to all its ammunition.

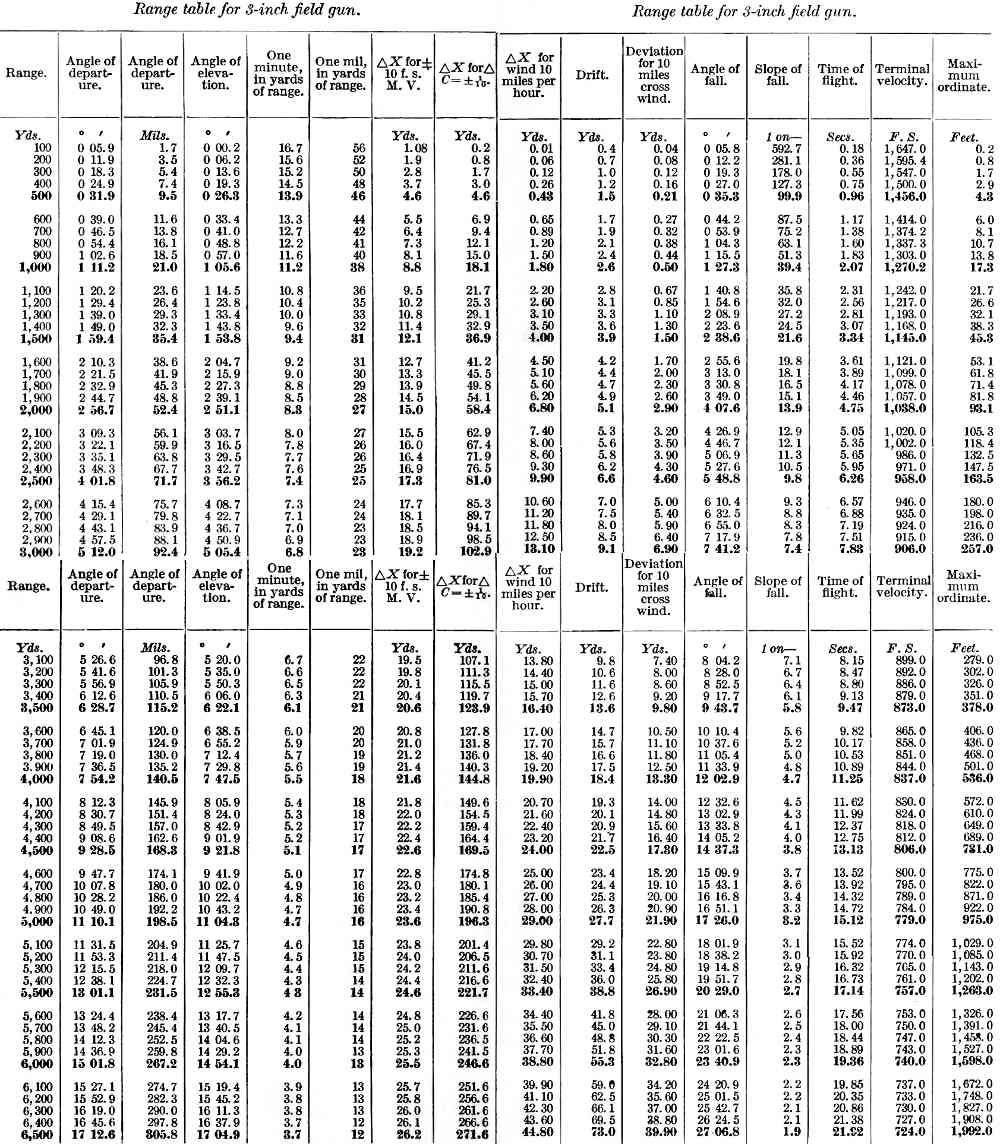
Range tables for US 3-inch field gun, models 1902–1905.

== Range table for British 3 inch (76.2 mm) Stokes Mortar, 1917 ==
Different propellant charges were used to achieve required range, angle of descent and flight time. This is typical of mortars and howitzers.

(Provisional) Range Table For 3-Inch Stokes Mortar, Printed in September 1917.
Cartridge : 95 gr (6.2 g) ballistite, reinforced with Charges : 5 grains, guncotton yarn
Rings : 110 gr (7.1 g), .3 mm flake cordite
Projectile : Bomb, 10 lb. 11 oz (4.85 kg)

	Cartridge Only		1 Ring		2 Rings		3 Rings		4 Rings	
	Range	Time of Flight	Range	Time of Flight	Range	Time of Flight	Range	Time of Flight	Range	Time of Flight
degs	yds	secs	yds	secs	yds	secs	yds	secs	yds	secs
45	240	7·1	420	9·6	550	11·6	660	13·2	800	15·0
50	233	7·6	411	10·4	538	12·5	649	14·3	780	16·2
52	228	7·8	404	10·7	530	12·9	639	14·7	767	16·6
54	222	8·0	395	10·9	518	13·2	626	15·1	748	17·0
56	215	8·2	384	11·2	503	13·5	608	15·4	726	17·4
58	207	8·4	371	11·4	486	13·8	589	15·8	701	17·8
60	197	8·5	357	11·7	467	14·1	567	16·1	672	18·2
61	193	8·6	349	11·8	457	14·3	554	16·3	656	18·4
62	187	8·7	340	11·9	445	14·4	542	16·4	640	18·5
63	182	8·8	332	12·0	434	14·5	528	16·6	623	18·7
64	176	8·8	323	12·1	422	14·6	514	16·7	605	18·8
65	170	8·9	313	12·2	409	14·8	499	16·9	586	19·0
66	164	9·0	303	12·3	396	14·9	483	17·0	567	19·1
67	158	9·0	292	12·4	383	15·0	468	17·1	547	19·2
68	152	9·1	281	12·5	369	15·1	451	17·2	526	19·4
69	145	9·2	270	12·5	354	15·2	434	17·4	505	19·5
70	138	9·2	259	12·6	339	15·3	416	17·5	483	19·6
71	131	9·2	247	12·7	324	15·4	398	17·6	460	19·7
72	124	9·3	235	12·8	308	15·5	379	17·7	437	19·8
73	117	9·3	223	12·9	292	15·5	360	17·8	413	19·9
74	109	9·4	210	12·9	275	15·6	340	17·9	389	20·0
75	102	9·4	197	13·0	259	15·7	320	18·0	364	20·1
