= 101st (Northumbrian) Regiment Royal Artillery =

British Army reserve artillery regiment

101 (Northumbrian) Regiment Royal Artillery
- Active: 1967–Present
- Allegiance: United Kingdom
- Branch: British Army
- Role: Field support
- Size: 4 Batteries; 454 personnel
- Part of: 3rd Deep Reconnaissance Strike Brigade
- Garrison/HQ: Napier Armoury, Gateshead
- Nickname: The Northern Gunners
- Equipment: M270 Multiple Launch Rocket System

101 (Northumbrian) Medium Regiment Royal Artillery is part of the Army Reserve and has sub units throughout the north east as well as one sub unit in Leeds, West Yorkshire. It is equipped with M270 Multiple Launch Rocket System (MLRS).

== History ==
The origins of the Regiment can be traced back to 1860 when Artillery Volunteer units were raised in the United Kingdom, as a result of threats of a French invasion. This continued through the formation of the Territorial Force in 1908, and the re-forming of the Territorial Army in 1947.

The Regiment was formed on the restructuring of the Territorial Army in April 1967. It was formed from 272 Field Regiment RA (Northumbrian) TA (formed in 1916, known as 72 Field Regiment until 1947 and based at the Barrack Road drill hall in Newcastle upon Tyne), 274 Field Regiment (Northumbrian) RA (TA) (formed in 1938, known as 74 Field Regiment until 1947 and based at South Shields), 324 Heavy Air Defence Regiment RA (TA) (raised in 1947 and based in Gosforth) and 439 Light Air Defence Regiment (formed in 1955 and based in Tynemouth).

The new regiment was equipped with BL 5.5-inch medium guns and had its headquarters at the Army Reserve centre at Barrack Road in Newcastle upon Tyne. In 1976, it was redesignated as a Field Regiment and re-equipped with the 105mm light gun. Around 1990, the regimental headquarters moved to Napier Armoury in Gateshead.

The Regiment supported the Ministry of Agriculture, Fisheries and Food, in the North-East of the UK, during the outbreak on foot-and-mouth disease in September 2001.

In 2006, 269 (West Riding) Battery Royal Artillery was transferred from 106th (Yeomanry) Regiment Royal Artillery to this regiment.

Under Army 2020, its role is more specific. All batteries were re-roled to the M270 Multiple Launch Rocket System. It was paired with 39 Regiment until the end of March 2015, and with 3 RHA afterwards. It will also support 1 RHA, 19 and 26 RA.

== Batteries ==
The current structure of the regiment is as follows:

- Regimental Headquarters, at Napier Armoury, Gateshead
- 203 (Elswick) Battery Royal Artillery, in Blyth
- 204 (Tyneside Scottish) Battery Royal Artillery, in Kingston Park, Newcastle upon Tyne
- 205 (3rd Durham Volunteer Artillery) Battery Royal Artillery, at Northfield Gardens, South Shields
  - Catterick Troop, at Marne Barracks, Catterick Garrison
- 269 (West Riding) Battery Royal Artillery, at Carlton Gate, Leeds

== Freedoms ==
The Regiment has received the Freedom of several locations throughout its history; these include:

- (England) January 1980: Newcastle upon Tyne.
- (England) 30 April 2016: Northumberland.

== Sources ==
- Hewitson, T L (2006). Weekend Warriors. Tempus Publishing. ISBN 0-7524-3756-9.
- Litchfield, Norman E H, 1992. The Territorial Artillery 1908-1988, The Sherwood Press, Nottingham. ISBN 0-9508205-2-0
- Osborne, Mike, 2006. Always Ready: The Drill Halls of Britain's Volunteer Forces, Partizan Press, Essex. ISBN 1-85818-509-2
