= Outline of the British Army at the end of the Cold War =

The following is a hierarchical outline for the structure of the British Army in 1989. The most authoritative source for this type of information available is Ministry of Defence (Army Department), Master Order of Battle, (ASD 6500-25 Ministry of Defence, 1991) and United Kingdom Land Forces, HQ UKLF, UKLF ORBAT Review Action Plan, HQ UKLF, 1990.

At the top of the Army organisation is the Army Board of the Defence Council. The executive committee of the Army Board was responsible for the 'detailed management of the Army.' It included the four military members of the Army Board, including the Chief of the General Staff, General Sir John Chapple in 1989, the Second Permanent Under Secretary, and the Assistant Chief of the General Staff, a major general. The Army Department consisted of four components: the General Staff, the Adjutant General's department, which dealt with recruiting, and also had the Provost Marshal (Army), a brigadier, reporting to him, though the RMP headquarters was at Roussillon Barracks, Chichester; the Military Secretary's department, and the Quartermaster General's department.

== United Kingdom Land Forces ==
Commander-in-Chief, UK Land Forces, General Sir Charles Huxtable

HQ: Wilton

HQ United Kingdom Land Forces commanded nine military districts until the spring of 1991. These districts controlled the regular army brigades in the UK (inc 1st and 5th Brigades) and the predominantly TA regional brigades. In 1984–85, the nine districts were Eastern (19th and 54th Brigades), London, North-East (2nd Infantry Division, 15, 24, and 49 Brigades), North-West District (42 Brigade), Scotland (51 and 52 Brigades), South-Eastern District (2 and 5 Brigades), South-West District (UK Contingent, ACE Mobile Force, 1, and 43 Brigades) Headquarters Wales (160 Brigade), and Western District (143 Brigade).

In December 1989, Headquarters UK Land Forces at Wilton directed field forces through a three-star's command, Commander UK Field Army, Lieutenant General Sir David Ramsbotham. Many of the units stationed in the United Kingdom were to move immediately to Germany to reinforce British Army of the Rhine (BAOR) in case of war between NATO and the Warsaw Pact. For administrative purposes these units were under command of brigade HQ based in the UK during peacetime. Such reinforcement units are indicated in the list below in italics followed by the higher command they were to reinforce in Germany in brackets.

- British Gurkhas Nepal

=== Scotland ===
- Army Headquarters Scotland, Edinburgh, covering Scotland
  - HQ Scotland District & 242 (Scottish) Signal Squadron, Royal Signals, Edinburgh
  - 51st (Highland) Infantry Brigade, Perth, covering the Central, Fife, Tayside, Grampian and Highland regions, the Western, Shetland and Orkney islands, and the Northern part of the Strathclyde region (historic counties of Bute, Dunbartonshire, Argyll and Renfrewshire)
    - 1st Battalion, Gordon Highlanders, Fort George, Inverness, (Light Role)
    - 1st Battalion, 51st Highland Volunteers (V), Perth, (to 11th Armoured Brigade included "Z" Company, Home Service Force)
    - 2nd Battalion, 51st Highland Volunteers (V), Elgin, (to BAOR for rear area security; included "X" and "Y" Companies, Home Service Force)
    - 3rd Battalion, 51st Highland Volunteers (V), Peterhead, (Home Defence, included "W" Company, Home Service Force)
    - 117th (Highland) Field Support Squadron, Royal Engineers (V), Dundee, (to 29th Engineer Brigade (V), 2nd Infantry Division)
    - 205 (Scottish) General Hospital, Royal Army Medical Corps (V), Inverness, (to Commander Medical Rear Communication Zone BAOR)
    - 225th (Highland) Field Ambulance, Royal Army Medical Corps (V), Forfar, (to Commander Medical Rear Communication Zone BAOR)
    - 252nd (Highland) Field Ambulance, Royal Army Medical Corps (V), Aberdeen, (to Commander Medical Rear Communication Zone BAOR)
  - 52nd (Lowland) Infantry Brigade, Edinburgh, covering the Borders, Dumfries and Galloway and Lothian regions, and the Southern part of the Strathclyde region (historic counties of Ayrshire, Lanarkshire and the city of Glasgow)
    - 1st Battalion, King's Own Scottish Borderers, Redford Barracks (Light Role)
    - 1st Battalion, 52nd Lowland Volunteers (V), (to BAOR for rear area security; included "F" and "G" Companies, Home Service Force)
    - 2nd Battalion, 52nd Lowland Volunteers (V), Edinburgh, (Home Defence)
    - 15th Battalion, Parachute Regiment (V), Glasgow, (to Parachute Regiment Group, 1st Armoured Division)
    - 105th (Scottish) Air Defence Regiment, Royal Artillery (V), Edinburgh, (to 1st Artillery Brigade, I British Corps, 64x Javelin)
    - 71st (Scottish) Engineer Regiment, Royal Engineers (V), Glasgow, (to 29th Engineer Brigade (V), 2nd Infantry Division)
    - 153rd (Highland) Transport Regiment, Royal Corps of Transport (V), Edinburgh, (to 1st Artillery Brigade, I British Corps to support the brigade's air defence regiments)
    - 154th (Lowland) Transport Regiment, Royal Corps of Transport (V), Glasgow, (to Commander Transport, I British Corps)
    - 23rd Security Company, Intelligence Corps (V), Edinburgh, (to HQ Intelligence & Security Group (Germany) BAOR)
    - 221st Transport Squadron, Royal Corps of Transport (V), Glasgow, (to Commander Transport & Movements BAOR)
    - 243rd Provost Company, Royal Military Police (V), Edinburgh, (to Provost Marshal BAOR)
  - 26th District Workshop, Royal Electrical and Mechanical Engineers, Stirling

=== North-East District ===
- North-East District, Imphal Barracks, York, covering the counties of Northumberland, Tyne and Wear, Durham, North Yorkshire, West Yorkshire, South Yorkshire, East Riding of Yorkshire, Nottinghamshire and Derbyshire
  - HQ North-East District & 240 (North) Signal Squadron, Royal Signals, York
  - Royal School of Signals, Catterick
    - 8th Signal Regiment Royal Corps of Signals, Vimy Lines (Responsible for trade training)
    - 11th Signal Regiment Royal Corps of Signals, Helles Barracks (Responsible for basic training)
  - 3rd Battalion, Worcestershire and Sherwood Foresters (V), Newark-on-Trent, (Home Defence)
  - 3rd Battalion, Yorkshire Volunteers (V), Huddersfield, (Home Defence)
  - 4th Battalion, Yorkshire Volunteers (V), Sheffield, (Home Defence)
  - 4th Battalion, Parachute Regiment (V), Leeds (to Parachute Regiment Group, 1st Armoured Division)
  - 38th Engineer Regiment, Royal Engineers, Claro Barracks, (-2x squadrons to Commander Engineers BAOR, to support the RAF Germany Harrier Force)
  - 150 (Northumbrian) Transport Regiment, Royal Corps of Transport (V), Hull, (to Commander Transport I British Corps)
  - 252nd Provost Company, Royal Military Police (V), Stockton-on-Tees, (to Provost Marshal BAOR)
  - 124th (Tyne Electrical Engineers) Recovery Company, Royal Electrical and Mechanical Engineers (V), Newton Aycliffe, (to Commander Maintenance I British Corps)
  - 34 Evacuation Hospital, Royal Army Medical Corps, Catterick, (to Commander Medical Communication Zone BAOR)
  - 201 (Northern) General Hospital, Royal Army Medical Corps (V), Newton Aycliffe, (to Commander Medical Rear Communication Zone BAOR)
  - 212 (Yorkshire) Field Hospital, Royal Army Medical Corps (V), Sheffield, (to Commander Medical I British Corps)
  - 223rd (Durham) Field Ambulance, Royal Army Medical Corps (V), Newton Aycliffe, (to 4th Armoured Division)
  - 31st District Workshop, Royal Electrical and Mechanical Engineers, Catterick
  - 41st District Workshop, Royal Electrical and Mechanical Engineers, Strensall

==== 2nd Infantry Division ====
- 2nd Infantry Division (0195), at Imphal Barracks, York
  - 2nd Infantry Divisional Signal Regiment, Royal Corps of Signals, at Imphal Barracks, York
    - Forward Divisional Headquarters, at Tunis Barracks, Lippstadt
    - 656 Signal Troop, at Tunis Barracks, Lippstadt
    - 85 Intelligence Section, Intelligence Corps, at Imphal Barracks, York (detached from 8 Intelligence & Sec Coy)
  - 2nd Divisional Cash Office, Royal Army Pay Corps
  - 2nd Infantry Divisional Transport Regiment, Royal Corps of Transport, at Gaza Barracks, Catterick Garrison
    - 60 Transport Squadron [to 157 Regiment RCT (V)]
    - 216 (Tyne/Tees) Transport Squadron (V), in Tynemouth
  - 2nd Ordnance Battalion, Royal Army Ordnance Corps, at Gaza Barracks, Catterick Garrison
    - 22 Ordnance Company (V), at Coulby Newham, Middlesbrough
    - 23 Ordnance Company (V), at Harewood Barracks, Leeds
  - 15th Field Workshop, Royal Electrical and Mechanical Engineers, at Beach Head Lines, Catterick Garrison
  - 150 Provost Company, Royal Military Police, at Beach Head Lines, Catterick Garrison (detachment to 24 Airmobile Bde)
  - 620 Tactical Air Control Party
  - 622 Tactical Air Control Party
  - 623 Tactical Air Control Party
  - 625 Tactical Air Control Party
  - 15th Infantry Brigade, Alanbrooke Barracks, Topcliffe
    - HQ 15th Infantry Brigade & Signal Troop (V), Royal Signals, Topcliffe
    - Queen's Own Yeomanry (V), Newcastle upon Tyne (Armoured car Reconnaissance)
    - 1st (Cleveland) Battalion, Yorkshire Volunteers (V), York
    - 2nd (Yorkshire & Humberside) Battalion, Yorkshire Volunteers (V), York
    - 6th Battalion, Royal Regiment of Fusiliers (V), Newcastle upon Tyne
    - 7th (Durham) Battalion, The Light Infantry (V), Durham
    - 8th (Yorkshire) Battalion, The Light Infantry (V), Wakefield
    - 101st (Northumbrian) Field Regiment, Royal Artillery (V), Newcastle upon Tyne, (light field artillery)
  - 24th Airmobile Brigade, at Catterick Garrison
    - 210 Signal Squadron, Royal Corps of Signals, at Catterick Garrison
    - 1st Battalion, The Green Howards (Alexandra, Princess of Wales's Own Yorkshire Regiment), at Somme Barracks, Catterick Garrison (Airmobile Infantry, 42 x MILAN Anti-Tank Missile Launchers)
      - 586 Signal Troop (Airmobile), Royal Corps of Signals
      - Band of the Green Howards (Small Infantry Band)
    - 1st Battalion, Prince of Wales's Own Regiment of Yorkshire, at Bourlon Barracks, Catterick Garrison (Airmobile Infantry, 42 x MILAN Anti-Tank Missile Launchers)
      - Band of the Prince of Wales's Own Regiment of Yorkshire (Small Infantry Band)
    - 3rd Battalion, The Light Infantry, at Weeton Barracks, Blackpool (Mechanised Infantry (Wheeled), 43 x Saxon APCs and 8 x Fox Armoured Cars) – conversion to Airmobile Infantry halted in 1988, was to be replaced at next arms plot change – also Northern Ireland province reinforcement bn
      - 568 Signal Troop, Royal Corps of Signals
      - Band of the Prince of Wales's Own Regiment of Yorkshire (Small Infantry Band)
    - 27th Field Regiment, Royal Artillery, at Alanbrooke Barracks, Topcliffe (18 x FH70 155 mm field howitzers) [to 1st Artillery Brigade] (Note: During peacetime these regiments were under command of their brigade. On mobilisation the regiments would join their divisional artillery. Then, on the move to West Germany would join the 1st Artillery Brigade.)
    - 51 Field Squadron (Airmobile), Royal Engineers, at Claro Barracks, Ripon (under admin of 38 Engineer Regiment)
    - 24 Ordnance Company, Royal Army Ordnance Corps, at Gaza Barracks, Catterick Garrison (under admin of 2 Ordnance Bn)
    - 24th (Airmobile) Field Ambulance, Royal Army Medical Corps, in Catterick Garrison
    - 9th Regiment Army Air Corps, at Alanbrooke Barracks, Topcliffe (reformed 1 April 1989)
  - 29th (Volunteer) Engineer Brigade, Newcastle upon Tyne (Tasked to support 1 (BR) Corps)
    - HQ 29th Engineer Brigade & Signal Troop, Royal Signals, Newcastle upon Tyne
    - 71st (Scottish) Engineer Regiment Corps of Royal Engineers (V), RAF Leuchars
    - 72nd (Tyne Electrical Engineers) Engineer Regiment, Corps of Royal Engineers (V), Gateshead
    - 73rd Volunteer Engineer Regiment Corps of Royal Engineers (V), Bilborough
    - 15 Field Support Squadron RE – Claro Barracks Ripon 38 Engineer Regiment – Regular unit in direct support
    - 105 (Tyne Electrical Engineers) Plant Squadron Corps of Royal Engineers (V), Gateshead
    - 29th Engineer Brigade Workshop, Royal Electrical and Mechanical Engineers (V), Newcastle upon Tyne
  - 49th Infantry Brigade, Chilwell
    - HQ 49th Infantry Brigade & Signal Troop (V), Royal Signals, Chilwell
    - 5th Battalion, Royal Anglian Regiment (V), Peterborough, (to 49th Infantry Brigade, 2nd Infantry Division)
    - 7th Battalion, Royal Anglian Regiment (V), Leicester, (to 49th Infantry Brigade, 2nd Infantry Division)
    - 5th Battalion, Royal Regiment of Fusiliers (V), Coventry, (to 49th Infantry Brigade, 2nd Infantry Division)
    - 5th (Shropshire and Herefordshire) Battalion, The Light Infantry (V), Shrewsbury, (to 49th Infantry Brigade, 2nd Infantry Division)
    - 3rd Battalion, Staffordshire Regiment (Prince of Wales’s) (V), Wolverhampton,
    - Royal Yeomanry (V), Chelsea, (Reconnaissance) (80x FV721 Fox, 20x Spartan)
    - 100th (Yeomanry) Field Regiment, Royal Artillery (V), London, 24x L118 light guns)

=== Eastern District ===
Eastern District, Colchester, covering the counties of Bedfordshire, Hertfordshire, Essex, Cambridgeshire, Suffolk, Leicestershire, Norfolk, Rutland, Northamptonshire, and Lincolnshire HQ Eastern District & 239 Signal Squadron, Royal Signals, Colchester

- 19th Infantry Brigade, at Goojerat Barracks, Colchester Garrison
  - 209 Signal Squadron, Royal Corps of Signals, at Goojerat Barracks, Colchester Garrison
  - 19th Cash Office (United Kingdom), Royal Army Pay Corps
  - Royal Hussars (Prince of Wales' Own), at Bhurtpore Barracks, Tidworth Camp (Type 57 Armoured, 57 x Challenger 1 main battle tanks, 14 x FV432 armoured personnel carriers, and 8 x CVR(T) Scorpions) [1 x Sqn to UKMF(L), only 3 x squadrons]
    - C Squadron (to Allied Mobile Force)
    - B Squadron, at Harman Lines, Warminster (RAC Demo Sqn at the School of Infantry)
    - Band of the Royal Hussars (Small Royal Armoured Corps Band)
  - 1st Battalion, King's Own Royal Border Regiment, at Meeanee Barracks, Colchester Garrison (Mechanised Infantry (Wheeled), with 8 x Fox armoured cars, and 43 x Saxon armoured personnel carriers)
    - Regimental Band of the King's Own Royal Border Regiment (Small Regimental Band)
  - 1st Battalion, Royal Anglian Regiment, at Hyderabad Barracks, Colchester Garrison (Mechanised Infantry (Wheeled), with 8 x Fox armoured cars, and 43 x Saxon armoured personnel carriers)
    - Band of the 1st Battalion, Royal Anglian Regiment (Small Regimental Band)
  - 3rd Battalion, Royal Anglian Regiment, at Roman Barracks, Colchester Garrison (Mechanised Infantry (Wheeled), with 8 x Fox armoured cars, and 43 x Saxon armoured personnel carriers)
    - Band of the 3rd Battalion, Royal Anglian Regiment (Small Regimental Band)
  - 45th Field Regiment, Royal Artillery, at Kirkee Barracks, Colchester Garrison (18 x FH70 155 mm field howitzers) [to 1st Artillery Brigade]
  - 34 Field Squadron, Royal Engineers, at RAF Waterbeach (under admin of 39th Engineer Regiment, RE)
  - 1 x Postal and Courier Detachment, RE
  - 1 Transport Squadron, Royal Corps of Transport, at Goojerat Barracks, Colchester Garrison
  - 42 Ordnance Company, Royal Army Ordnance Corps, at Colchester Garrison
  - 8th Field Workshop, Royal Electrical and Mechanical Engineers, at McMunn Barracks, Colchester Garrison
  - 19th Field Ambulance, Royal Army Medical Corps, at Goojerat Barracks, Colchester Garrison (18 x Land Rover Field Ambulances)
  - 156 Provost Company, Royal Military Police, at Goojerat Barracks, Colchester Garrison
- 54th (East Anglian) Infantry Brigade, Grantham
  - 1st Battalion, Royal Highland Fusiliers, Oakington Barracks
  - 6th Battalion, Royal Anglian Regiment (V), Bury St Edmunds, (Home Defence)
- 12th Engineer Brigade, RAF Waterbeach (Controlling the RAF support units of the RE)
  - 39th Airfield Damages Repair Engineer Regiment Corps of Royal Engineers, RAF Waterbeach
  - Airfield Works Group (Group wasn't deployable)
    - 529 Air Support Specialist Team Corps of Royal Engineers, RAF Waterbeach (529 STRE was deployable)
  - 50 Construction Field Squadron Corps of Royal Engineers, Invicta Park Barracks
  - 212 Airfield Damage Repair Squadron Corps of Royal Engineers (V), RAF Wattisham
  - 216 Airfield Damage Repair Squadron Corps of Royal Engineers (V), RAF Marham
  - 218 Airfield Damage Repair Squadron Corps of Royal Engineers (V), RAF Brize Norton
  - 219 Airfield Damage Repair Squadron Corps of Royal Engineers (V), RAF Coningsby
  - 234 Air Damage Repair Squadron Corps of Royal Engineers (V), RAF Leeming
  - 236 Air Damage Repair Squadron Corps of Royal Engineers (V), RAF Kinloss
  - 267 Air Damage Repair Squadron Corps of Royal Engineers (V), RAF Waddington
- Military Works Force Chetwynd Barracks (Controlling the specialist teams of the Corps of Royal Engineers)
  - 62 Chief Engineer Command (Works) [Water utilities, water development, and well drilling]
  - 63 Chief Engineer Command (Works) [Electrical power generation and distribution, originally utilities and force protection]
  - 64 Chief Engineer Command (Works) [Fuels, fuel production, and distribution]
  - 65 Chief Engineer Command (Works) (V) [Civilian infrastructure, railway and ports infrastructure lines of communications]
- 16th Air Defence Regiment, Royal Artillery, Rapier Barracks, Kirton in Lindsey, (to 1st Artillery Brigade, -1x Battery to 1st Infantry Brigade, -1x Battery to 3 Commando Brigade, 48x towed Rapier missile systems)
- 162nd Movement Control Regiment, Royal Corps of Transport (V), Grantham, (to Commander Transport I British Corps)
- 160th Transport Regiment, Royal Corps of Transport (V), Grantham, (to 2nd Transport Group, BAOR)
- 156th Provost Company, Royal Military Police, Colchester
- 161st Ambulance Regiment, Royal Corps of Transport (V), Grantham, (to 2nd Transport Group, BAOR)
- 163rd Transport and Movement Regiment, Royal Corps of Transport (V), Grantham, (to 2nd Transport Group, BAOR)
- 7th Ordnance Battalion, Royal Army Ordnance Corps, Colchester
- 8th Field Workshop, Royal Electrical and Mechanical Engineers, Colchester, (to 4th Armoured Division)
- 118th Recovery Company, Royal Electrical and Mechanical Engineers (V), Northampton, (to Commander Maintenance BAOR)
- 19th Field Ambulance, Royal Army Medical Corps, Colchester, (to 4th Armoured Division)
- 222nd (East Midlands) Field Ambulance, Royal Army Medical Corps (V), Leicester, (to 4th Armoured Division)
- 250th Field Ambulance, Royal Army Medical Corps (V), Grimsby, (to 2nd Infantry Division)
- 254th Field Ambulance, Royal Army Medical Corps (V), Cambridge, (to 2nd Infantry Division)
- 275th Railway Squadron, Royal Corps of Transport (V), Grantham, (to 2nd Transport Group, BAOR)
- 35th Base Workshop, Royal Electrical and Mechanical Engineers, Old Dalby
- 36th District Workshop, Royal Electrical and Mechanical Engineers, Colchester

=== London District ===
London District, Horse Guards, covering Greater London

- HQ London District & 238 Signal Squadron, Royal Signals, Chelsea
- Postal and Courier Depot, Royal Engineers, Mill Hill
  - Central Volunteer HQ Royal Engineers (Postal and Courier Services) Mill Hill
    - 1 Postal and Courier Group (V), Royal Engineers (Home Defence - UKLF)
      - 5th Postal and Courier Regiment (V) Royal Engineers, (in support of Home Defence - Eastern and North-East Districts)
      - 6th Postal and Courier Regiment (V) Royal Engineers, (in support of Home Defence - Western, South-West and Wales Districts)
      - 7th Postal and Courier Regiment (V), Royal Engineers, (in support of Home Defence - London, Eastern and South-East Districts)
      - 8th Postal and Courier Regiment (V), Royal Engineers, (in support of Home Defence - North-west, Scotland and Northern Ireland Districts)
    - 15 Postal and Courier Squadron (V), Royal Engineers, (in support of 1st Postal and Courier Regiment, Royal Engineers - 1 (BR) Corps - BAOR)
    - 25 Postal and Courier Squadron (V), Royal Engineers, (in support of 2nd Postal and Courier Regiment, Royal Engineers - UKLF)
    - 34, 35 & 36 Postal and Courier Squadron (V), Royal Engineers, (in support of 3rd Postal and Courier Depot, Royal Engineers - CommZ - BAOR)
    - 41 & 42 Postal and Courier Squadron (V), Royal Engineers, (in support of 4th Postal and Courier Regiment, Royal Engineers - SHAPE)
- 12th (Volunteer) Signal Brigade (V), Chelsea Barracks (Controlling the volunteer reserve signal units assigned to BAOR)
  - 34 (Northern) Signal Regiment, Royal Corps of Signals (V), Middlesbrough (Serving as rear communications unit for BAOR)
  - 36 (Eastern) Signal Regiment Royal Corps of Signals (V), Sparkbrook (Providing communications for 1 (BR) Corps)
  - 40 (Ulster) Signal Regiment, Royal Corps of Signals (V), Belfast (Providing communications for 1 (BR) Corps)
  - 55 Signal Squadron Royal Corps of Signals (V), Liverpool
  - 56 Signal Squadron (V) Royal Corps of Signals, Bethnal Green
  - 81 (Northern Ireland) Signal Squadron Royal Corps of Signals (V), Wolverhampton (Supporting rear RAF air bases)
- 56th (London) Infantry Brigade, London, home defence
  - Household Cavalry Mounted Regiment, Hyde Park Barracks
  - 1st Battalion, Coldstream Guards, Wellington Barracks (Home Defence/Public Duties)
  - 1st Battalion, Irish Guards, Chelsea Barracks (Home Defence/Public Duties, moved to Wavell Barracks in Berlin by December)
  - 1st Battalion, Welsh Guards, Victoria Barracks (Home Defence/Public Duties, six month roulement to British Forces Belize from April to October 1989)
  - 2nd Battalion, Grenadier Guards, Caterham Barracks (Home Defence/Public Duties, in Kenya during the early part of the year)
  - 2nd Battalion, Scots Guards, Cavalry Barracks (Home Defence/Public Duties)
- Honourable Artillery Company, Finsbury, (Surveillance and Target Acquisition Battalion, to 1st Artillery Brigade, I British Corps)
- (17th) Depot Regiment Royal Artillery, Royal Artillery Barracks
- King's Troop, Royal Horse Artillery, Royal Artillery Barracks
- 4th Battalion, Royal Green Jackets (V), Mayfair, London (to 12th Armoured Brigade)
- 8th Battalion, Queen's Fusiliers (V), Clapham, (to 1st Artillery Brigade, I British Corps, as 50th Missile Regiment security unit)
- 10th Battalion, Parachute Regiment (V), Chelsea, (to Parachute Regiment Group, 1st Armoured Division)
- 101 (City of London) Engineer Regiment (Explosive Ordnance Disposal), Royal Engineers (V), London, (to Commander Engineers BAOR)
- 31 (City of London) Signal Regiment, Royal Signals (V), London, (to 11th Signal Brigade (V), BAOR)
- 151 (Greater London) Transport Regiment, Royal Corps of Transport (V), Croydon, (to Commander Transport I British Corps)
- 20th Security Company, Intelligence Corps (V), London, (to HQ Intelligence & Security Group (Germany) BAOR)
- 21st Intelligence Company (Imagery Analysis), Intelligence Corps (V), London, (to HQ Intelligence & Security Group (Germany) BAOR)
- 22nd Intelligence Company, Intelligence Corps (V), London, (to HQ Intelligence & Security Group (Germany) BAOR)
- 24th Intelligence Company, Intelligence Corps (V), London, (to HQ Intelligence & Security Group (Germany) BAOR)
- 73rd Ordnance Company (Petrol), Royal Army Ordnance Corps (V), Romford, (to Commander Supply BAOR)
- 135th Independent Topographic Squadron, Royal Engineers (V), London, (to Commander Engineers BAOR)
- 253rd Provost Company, Royal Military Police (V), London, (to Provost Marshal BAOR)
- 30 General Hospital, Royal Army Medical Corps, Woolwich, (to Commander Medical Rear Communication Zone, BAOR)
- 217 General Hospital, Royal Army Medical Corps (V), Walworth, (to Commander Medical I British Corps)
- 221st Field Ambulance, Royal Army Medical Corps (V), Kingston-upon-Thames, (to 3rd Armoured Division)
- 873rd Movement Light Squadron, Royal Engineers (V), Acton, (to 29th Engineer Brigade (V), 2nd Infantry Division, provides lighting for night operations)
- 30th District Workshop, Royal Electrical and Mechanical Engineers, Mill Hill

=== South-East District ===
- South Eastern District, Aldershot, covering the counties of Berkshire, Buckinghamshire, East Sussex, West Sussex, Kent, Surrey, Hampshire and Oxfordshire, and the Isle of Wight
  - HQ South-East District & 251 Signal Squadron, Royal Signals, Aldershot
  - 33rd Explosive Ordnance Disposal Engineer Regiment Corps of Royal Engineers, Lodge Hill Camp
- 2nd (Southeast) Infantry Brigade, Shorncliffe
  - 2nd Battalion, Wessex Regiment (V), Reading, (Home Defence)
  - 2nd Battalion, Royal Green Jackets, Connaught Barracks, (for BAOR for rear area security, Saxon, 8x FV721 Fox, 81 mm Mortars; Northern Ireland Lisnaskea incremental roulement battalion from February to June 1989)
  - 5th Battalion, Royal Green Jackets (V), Oxford, (to I British Corps as HQ security unit)
  - 5th Battalion, Queen's Regiment (V), Canterbury (to 20th Armoured Brigade)
  - 6th/7th Battalion, Queen's Regiment (V), Horsham (Home Defence)
  - 69th Gurkha Independent Field Squadron, Chatham
- 5th Airborne Brigade, at Arnhem Barracks, Aldershot Garrison
  - 205 Signal Squadron, Royal Corps of Signals, at Arnhem Barracks, Aldershot Garrison
  - 640 Signal Troop (Electronic Warfare), Royal Corps of Signals, at Blandford Camp
  - The Life Guards, at Combermere Barracks, Windsor (Armoured Reconnaissance (Wheeled), 10 x CVR(T) Scorpions, 9 x CVR(T) Scimitars, 6 x CVR(T) Spartan, 6 x CVR(T) Striker 1 x CVR(T) Sultan) – C Sqn detached to Cyprus from January–July 1989 on UN duty
    - B Squadron (assigned to 3rd Commando Brigade, Royal Marines)
    - C Squadron (assigned to protect key government personnel and the Royal Family, 7 x Fox Armoured Cars and 2 x CVR(T) Spartan)
    - Band of the Life Guards (Major Staff Band)
  - 1st Battalion, The Parachute Regiment, at Bruneval Barracks, Aldershot Garrison (Parachute Infantry)
    - Pegasus Band of the Parachute Regiment (Large Infantry Band)
  - 2nd Battalion, The Parachute Regiment, at Normandy Barracks, Aldershot Garrison (Note: At Clive Barracks in Ternhill under 143rd (West Midlands) Brigade until April 1989 as Northern Ireland reaction battalion.) (Parachute Infantry)
    - Falklands Band of the Parachute Regiment (Large Infantry Band)
  - 1st Battalion, Royal Regiment of Fusiliers, in Dover
  - 1st Battalion, 2nd King Edward VII's Own Gurkha Rifles, in Church Crookham
  - 7th Parachute Regiment, Royal Horse Artillery, at Lille Barracks, Aldershot Garrison (18 x L118 105 mm Light Guns)
    - P Air Defence Battery, Royal Artillery (10 x Javelin surface-to-air missiles)
  - 36th Engineer Regiment, Royal Engineers, at Invicta Park Barracks, Maidstone
    - 50 Field Squadron (Construction) [to 39 Engineer Regiment, RE]
  - 5th Airborne Brigade Logistic Battalion
  - 10th Airborne Workshop, Royal Electrical and Mechanical Engineers, at Louisbourg Barracks, Bordon Camp
- Parachute Regiment Group (V), Aldershot, (to 1st Armoured Division)
  - Group HQ & Signals Troop, Royal Signals, Aldershot
- Royal School of Military Engineering, Chatham, Kent
  - 1st Training Regiment Corps of Royal Engineers, Princess Royal Barracks
  - 3rd Training Regiment Corps of Royal Engineers, Princess Royal Barracks
  - 12th Royal School of Military Engineer Regiment Corps of Royal Engineers, Chattenden Military Camp
  - Junior Leaders Regiment Corps of Royal Engineers, Connaught Barracks
- 47th Field Regiment, Royal Artillery, Baker Barracks, Thorney Island, (to 1st Infantry Brigade, 24x FH-70 howitzers)
  - 21 Air Defence Battery (36x Javelin)
- 17th Port & Maritime Regiment, Royal Corps of Transport, Marchwood
- 20th Maritime Regiment, Royal Corps of Transport, Gosport
- 27th Regiment, Royal Corps of Transport, Aldershot
- 11th Ordnance (EOD) Battalion, Royal Army Ordnance Corps, Didcot
- Logistic Support Battalion, AMF (L), Aldershot, (to Allied Mobile Force (L))
- 56th Signal Squadron, Royal Signals (V), Sandgate, (to 4th Signal Group, BAOR)
- 244 Signal Squadron (Air Support), RAF Brize Norton
- 160th Provost Company, Royal Military Police, Aldershot
- 240th Provost (Training) Company, Royal Military Police, Aldershot
- 3rd Field Workshop, Royal Electrical and Mechanical Engineers, Bordon
- 10th Airborne Workshop, Royal Electrical and Mechanical Engineers, Borden, (supported 5th Airborne Brigade)
- 16th Armoured Field Ambulance, Aldershot (to 1st Infantry Brigade)
- 33 Field Hospital, Royal Army Medical Corps, Aldershot, (to Commander Medical I British Corps)
- 74th Ordnance Company (Petrol), Royal Army Ordnance Corps (V), Camberley, (to Commander Supply BAOR)
- 9th Field Workshop, Royal Electrical and Mechanical Engineers (V), Hilsea
- 32nd Base Workshop, Royal Electrical and Mechanical Engineers, Bicester
- 43rd District Workshop, Royal Electrical and Mechanical Engineers, Aldershot
- 44th District Workshop, Royal Electrical and Mechanical Engineers, Ashford
- 133rd (Kent) Corps Troops Workshop, Royal Electrical and Mechanical Engineers (V), Maidstone, (to Commander Maintenance I British Corps)
- 126th Reclamation Workshop, Royal Electrical and Mechanical Engineers (V), Bordon, (to Commander Maintenance British Corps)
- 201st Support Workshop, Royal Electrical and Mechanical Engineers (V), Bordon, (to Commander Maintenance BAOR)
- 207th Support Workshop, Royal Electrical and Mechanical Engineers (V), Bordon, (to Commander Maintenance BAOR)
- 209th Support Workshop, Royal Electrical and Mechanical Engineers (V), Bordon, (to Commander Maintenance BAOR)
- 211th Rear Combat Zone Workshop, Royal Electrical and Mechanical Engineers (V), Bordon, (to Commander Maintenance BAOR)
- 215th Recovery Company, Royal Electrical and Mechanical Engineers (V), Bordon, (to Commander Maintenance BAOR)
- 218th Port Workshop, Royal Electrical and Mechanical Engineers (V), Bordon, (to Commander Maintenance BAOR)
- 219th Port Workshop, Royal Electrical and Mechanical Engineers (V), Bordon, (to Commander Maintenance BAOR)
- 220th (1st Home Counties) Field Ambulance, Royal Army Medical Corps (V), Maidstone, (to 1st Armoured Division)
- 280th NATO HQ Workshop, Royal Electrical and Mechanical Engineers (V), Bordon, (to Commander Maintenance BAOR, supports SHAPE)
- 281st NATO HQ Workshop, Royal Electrical and Mechanical Engineers (V), Bordon, (to Commander Maintenance BAOR, supports AFCENT)
- 282nd NATO HQ Workshop, Royal Electrical and Mechanical Engineers (V), Bordon, (to Commander Maintenance BAOR, Supports NORTHAG)
- 304 General Hospital, Royal Army Medical Corps (V), Aldershot, (to Commander Medical Rear Communication Zone BAOR)
- 308 Evacuation Hospital, Royal Army Medical Corps (V), Aldershot, (to Commander Medical Communication Zone BAOR)
- 307th Field Ambulance, Royal Army Medical Corps (V), Aldershot, (to Commander Medical Communication Zone BAOR)
- 381st Field Medical Equipment Depot, Royal Army Medical Corps (V), Aldershot, (to Commander Medical Communication Zone BAOR)
- 501st Specialist Team (Bulk Petrol), Royal Engineers (V), Camberley, (to Commander Engineers BAOR)
- 503rd Specialist Team (Bulk Petrol), Royal Engineers (V), Camberley, (to Commander Engineers BAOR, to maintain the Central Europe Pipeline System)
- 520th Specialist Team (Well Drilling), Royal Engineers (V), Camberley, (to Commander Engineers BAOR)
- 521st Specialist Team (Well Drilling), Royal Engineers, Camberley, (to Commander Engineers BAOR)

=== South-West District ===
- South-West District, Bulford, covering the counties of Cornwall, Devon, Dorset, Bristol, Gloucestershire, Somerset and Wiltshire
  - HQ South-West District & 243 (Southern) Signal Squadron, Royal Signals, Bulford
  - Permanent Planning Group – Joint Force Headquarters, Bulford
  - 2 Postal and Courier Regiment, Royal Engineers, Duke of Gloucester Barracks South Cerney (Commanding Officer is UKLF Commander Postal and Courier Services)
    - 20 Postal and Courier Squadron, Royal Engineers, Duke of Gloucester Barracks South Cerney (in support of 3rd Commando Brigade, 5th Airborne Brigade, 24th Infantry Brigade, Allied Mobile Force (A) & SAS)
    - 21 Postal and Courier Squadron, Royal Engineers, Ward Barracks Bulford (in support of 1st Infantry Brigade, 19th Infantry Brigade, Allied Mobile Force (L))
  - Communications and Security Group (UK) (224 Sig Sqn), Cheltenham
  - 18th Base Workshop, Royal Electrical and Mechanical Engineers, Bovington
  - 27th District Workshop, Royal Electrical and Mechanical Engineers, Warminster
  - 1st Infantry Brigade, Jellalabad Barracks (United Kingdom Mobile Force)
    - HQ 1st Infantry Brigade & 215 Signal Squadron Royal Corps of Signals, Jellalabad Barracks
    - 13th/18th (Queen Mary's Own) Royal Hussars, Assaye Barracks (Armoured Reconnaissance)
    - Royal Hussars (Prince of Wales Own), Bhurtpore Barracks (Armoured)
    - 2nd Battalion, The Light Infantry, Tidworth
    - 1st Battalion, The Queen's Regiment, Mooltan Barracks (Mechanised)
    - 1st Battalion, The Devonshire and Dorset Regiment, Kiwi Barracks (Mechanised)
    - 1st Battalion, The Wessex Regiment (V), Devizes
    - 22nd Engineer Regiment Corps of Royal Engineers, Swinton Barracks
    - 158 Provost Company Corps of Royal Military Police, Gordon Barracks (under control of the Intelligence Corps)
  - 43rd (Wessex) Brigade, Wyvern Barracks
    - 30 Signal Regiment, Royal Signals, Blandford Camp
    - Royal Wessex Yeomanry (V), Highfield House, Cirencester (Light Reconnaissance)
    - 4th Battalion, Devonshire and Dorset Regiment (V), Exeter, (Home Defence)
    - 6th Battalion, The Light Infantry (V), Bath, (Home Defence)
    - 94th Locating Regiment, Royal Artillery, Roberts Barracks (Target Acquisition, to 1st Artillery Brigade, I British Corps)
    - 29th Transport & Movement Control Regiment Royal Transport Corps, Duke of Gloucester Barracks
    - 9th Ordnance Battalion Royal Army Ordnance Corps, Basil Hill Barracks
    - 174 Provost Company, Royal Military Police, Tidworth
    - 211th (Wessex) Field Hospital, Royal Army Medical Corps (V), Barnstaple, (to Commander Medical I British Corps)
    - 219th (Wessex) Field Hospital, Royal Army Medical Corps (V), Keynsham, (to Commander Medical I British Corps)
    - 266 (Gloucestershire Volunteer Artillery) Battery, Royal Artillery (V), Clifton, (to 1st Artillery Brigade, I British Corps, Observation Posts)
    - 414th Tank Transporter Unit Royal Corps of Transport, Bulford, (to 2nd Transport Group, BAOR)
  - Allied Mobile Force (L), Bulford
    - HQ Allied Mobile Force & 249 Signal Squadron (AMF(L)), Ward Barracks
    - 2nd Battalion The Royal Regiment of Fusiliers, Picton Barracks
    - 5 (Gibraltar 1779–83) Field Battery, 94th Locating Regiment Royal Artillery, Larkhill (6x L118 light guns)
  - School of Infantry, Waterloo Lines
    - 1st Battalion, Royal Regiment of Wales, Battlesbury Barracks, Warminster (Infantry Demonstration Battalion)

=== Wales District ===
- Headquarters Wales, Brecon, covering Wales
  - HQ Wales District & Signal Troop, Royal Signals, The Barracks, Brecon
  - 39th District Workshop Royal Electrical and Mechanical Engineers, Bridgend
  - 160th (Welsh) Infantry Brigade, Brecon
    - 3rd Battalion Royal Welch Fusiliers (V), Wrexham, (Home Defence)
    - 3rd Battalion Royal Regiment of Wales (V), Maindy Barracks Cardiff (to BAOR for rear area security)
    - 4th Battalion Royal Regiment of Wales (V), Swansea (Home Defence)
    - 104th Air Defence Regiment Royal Artillery (V), Newport (to 1st Artillery Brigade, I British Corps, 64x Javelin)
    - 157th (Wales & Midlands) Transport Regiment Royal Corps of Transport (V), Cardiff, (to Commander Transport I British Corps)
    - 203 (Welsh) General Hospital Royal Army Medical Corps (V), Cardiff, (to Commander Medical I British Corps)

=== Western District ===
- Western District, Shrewsbury, covering the counties of Shropshire, Staffordshire, West Midlands, Warwickshire, Herefordshire and Worcestershire
  - HQ Western District & 241 (West) Signal Squadron, Royal Signals, Donnington
  - 143rd (West Midlands) Infantry Brigade, Shrewsbury
    - Queen's Own Mercian Yeomanry (V), Coventry (Light Reconnaissance)
    - 1st Battalion Duke of Wellington's Regiment, Clive Barracks
    - 2nd Battalion The Parachute Regiment, Clive Barracks (in April moved to Normandy Barracks under 5th Airborne Brigade)
    - 4th Battalion Worcestershire and Sherwood Foresters (V), Redditch, (to Commander Communications I British Corps)
    - 202 (Midlands) General Hospital Royal Army Medical Corps (V), Birmingham, (to Commander Medical I British Corps)
    - 224th Field Ambulance Royal Army Medical Corps (V), Stoke-on-Trent, (to Commander Medical Rear Communication Zone BAOR)
    - 116th Provost Company, Royal Military Police (V), Cannock, (to Provost Marshal, I British Corps)
  - 30th (Volunteer) Engineer Brigade, Stafford, (to Commander Engineers BAOR)
    - Royal Monmouthshire Royal Engineers (Militia), Monmouth Castle
    - 74th (Antrim Artillery) Engineer Regiment Corps of Royal Engineers (V), Belfast
    - 75th Volunteer Engineer Regiment Royal Corps of Engineers (V), Failsworth
    - 111th Engineer Regiment, Royal Engineers (V), Camberley
    - 125 (Staffordshire) Field Support Squadron Royal Corps of Engineers (V), Stoke-on-Trent
    - 143 Plant Squadron Corps of Royal Engineers (V), Walsall
    - 30th Engineer Brigade Workshop, Royal Electrical and Mechanical Engineers (V), Stafford
  - 11th Signal Brigade (V), Stafford, (to Commander Communications BAOR)
    - 31 (City of London) Signal Regiment, Royal Corps of Signals (V), Hammersmith (Reserve trunk communications for SHAPE)
    - 33 (Lancashire and Cheshire) Signal Regiment, Royal Corps of Signals (V), Huyton (Rear communications for BAOR)
    - 35 (South Midlands) Signal Regiment, Royal Corps of Signals (V), Sparkbrook (Rear communications in Europe)
  - Royal Signals and Radar Establishment, Malvern
  - 34th Base Workshop, Royal Electrical and Mechanical Engineers, Donnington
  - Central Ammunition Depot Kineton, Royal Army Ordnance Corps
  - 72nd Ordnance Company (Ammo), Royal Army Ordnance Corps (V), Telford, (to Commander Supply BAOR)

=== North-West District ===
- North-West District, Preston, covering the counties of Cumbria, Lancashire, Merseyside, Greater Manchester and Cheshire, and the Isle of Man
  - HQ North-West District & Signal Squadron, Royal Signals, at Fulwood Barracks, Preston
  - 55 (Merseyside) Signal Squadron, Royal Corps of Signals (V), in Liverpool (Note: Detachments to 1st Armoured, 2nd Infantry, 3rd Armoured, 4th Armoured Divisions, 1st Artillery Brigade, and 1st Infantry Brigade.)
  - 411 Independent Combat Plant Troop, Royal Engineers (V), at Gordon House, Walsall (to Commander Engineers, BAOR)
  - 415 Combat Artisan Troop, Royal Engineers (V), in Failsworth, Oldham (to 221st Mobile Civilian Artisan Group, Commander Engineers, BAOR)
  - 42nd District Workshop, Royal Electrical and Mechanical Engineers, in Liverpool
  - Central Ammunition Depot Longtown, Royal Army Ordnance Corps
  - 42nd (Northwest) Infantry Brigade, The Castle, Chester, guards Merseyside Ports
    - 1st Battalion, Cheshire Regiment, Chester, (Light Role)
    - 3rd Battalion, The Light Infantry, Blackpool, (to 24th Airmobile Brigade, 43x Saxon, 8x Fox, 8x 81 mm Mortars)
    - Duke of Lancaster's Own Yeomanry (V), Chorley, (Reconnaissance, 80x Fox, 20x Spartan)
    - 3rd (Volunteer) Battalion, Cheshire Regiment (V), in Runcorn (Light Infantry, Home Defence) [to Commander Communications, I (British) Corps]
    - 4th Battalion, Queen's Lancashire Regiment (V), Preston, (to BAOR for rear area security)
    - 4th Battalion, King's Own Royal Border Regiment (V), Lancaster, (Home Defence)
    - 5th/8th Battalion, King's Regiment (V), Warrington, (to BAOR for rear area security)
    - 103rd (Lancashire Artillery Volunteers) Air Defence Regiment, Royal Artillery (V), in Liverpool (Light air defence, 64 x Javelin surface-to-air missiles) [to 2nd Infantry Division] (Note: During peacetime these regiments were under command of their brigade. On mobilisation the regiments would join their divisional artillery. Then, on the move to West Germany would join the 1st Artillery Brigade.)
    - 156th (Merseyside and Greater Manchester) Transport Regiment, Royal Corps of Transport (V), in Liverpool [to 2nd Transport Group, BAOR]
    - 207th (Manchester) General Hospital, Royal Army Medical Corps (V), in Manchester (800 x beds) [to Commander Medical, 1st British Corps]
    - 208th (Merseyside) General Hospital, Royal Army Medical Corps (V), in Liverpool (800 x beds) [to Commander Medical, RCZ]

=== Army Air Corps ===
- Army Air Corps, AAC Netheravon
  - 2 Wing AAC, AAC Netheravon (Wing disbanded during 1989)
    - 7 Regiment AAC, AAC Netheravon
      - 656 Squadron AAC, (Anti-tank, 4x Gazelle AH.1, 12x Lynx AH.7), (to 1st Infantry Brigade)
      - 666 Squadron AAC (V), (Home defence, 12x Gazelle AH.1)
      - 2 Flight AAC, (4x Gazelle AH.1), (to Allied Command Europe Mobile Force (Land))
      - 672 Squadron AAC, (Lynx Light Battlefield Helicopter Squadron, activated 1 January 1990, 12x Lynx AH.7)
      - 3 Flight AAC, (Gazelle AH.1)
    - 657 Squadron AAC, Colchester Garrison, (Anti-tank, 4x Gazelle AH.1, 12x Lynx AH.7), (to 19th Infantry Brigade)
  - School of Army Aviation, AAC Middle Wallop
    - 670 Squadron AAC, Middle Wallop, (Operational training, Gazelle AH.1, activated 1989)
    - 671 Squadron AAC, Middle Wallop, (Conversion to type, Gazelle AH.1, Lynx AH.7)
    - Trade Training School (Ground crew & maintenance training)
  - Development & Trials Squadron, AAC Middle Wallop, (12x Gazelle AH.1, under Director Army Air Corps. On 1 April 1990 renamed 667 (D&T) Squadron AAC)

=== British Army Training Unit Suffield ===
- British Army Training Unit Suffield, CFB Suffield, Canada
  - 75th Ordnance Company, Royal Army Ordnance Corps
  - 29 (BATUS) Flight AAC, (Gazelle AH.1)
  - Detachment 2 Postal and Courier Regiment, Royal Engineers

=== British Army Schools ===
- Royal Armoured Corps Centre, Bovington
  - Queen's Royal Irish Hussars, (2x squadrons at Royal Armoured Corps Training Regiment, Catterick, 57x Chieftain, 8x FV101 Scorpion)
- Royal School of Artillery, Larkhill
  - 14th Regiment, Royal Artillery, Larkhill (Support regiment)
- Royal School of Military Engineering, Chattenden
  - 12th Royal School of Military Engineering Regiment, Royal Engineers, Chattenden
- Royal School of Military Survey, Hermitage
  - 42nd Engineer Regiment, Royal Engineers, Hermitage (Geographic Survey)

== Headquarters Northern Ireland ==
The General Officer commanding Headquarters Northern Ireland reported directly, operationally, to the Secretary of State for Northern Ireland. During 1988 the disposition of brigades in Northern Ireland changed: On 1 July 1988 3rd Infantry Brigade reformed at Armagh and became responsible for the UK-Ireland border zone from Armagh to South Londonderry. The brigade had been disbanded in September 1981 with its units and area initially having been taken over by 8th Infantry Brigade. On 2 November 1988 107th (Ulster) Brigade (V) was raised and took command of all Territorial Army units in Northern Ireland, thus freeing 8th Infantry Brigade and 39th Infantry Brigade to focus on counterinsurgency operations. This structure was in force until the 1992 amalgamation of Royal Irish Rangers and Ulster Defence Regiment, after which 3rd Infantry Brigade returned to control its traditional area of County Armagh and County Down.

- Headquarters Northern Ireland, Thiepval Barracks, Lisburn
  - HQ Northern Ireland District & 233 (Northern Ireland) Signal Squadron, Royal Signals, Lisburn
  - 102nd (Ulster) Air Defence Regiment, Royal Artillery (V), in Newtownards (32 x Blowpipe surface-to-air missile launchers) [to Air Defence Group, 1st Artillery Brigade]
  - 22 Postal and Courier Squadron, Royal Engineers
  - 21st Transport and Movements Regiment, Royal Corps of Transport, at Moscow Camp, Belfast – formed in 1988
    - Royal Army Ordnance Corps Ordnance Depot, Northern Ireland
  - 152nd (Ulster) Ambulance Regiment, Royal Corps of Transport (V), in Belfast [to Commander Transport, I (British) Corps]
  - 204th (North Irish) General Hospital, Royal Army Medical Corps (V), in Belfast [800 x beds] [to Commander Medical, 1st British Corps]
  - 253rd (Northern Ireland) Field Ambulance, Royal Army Medical Corps (V), in Belfast [to Commander Medical, RCZ]
  - 254 Provost Company, Royal Military Police (V), in Belfast [to Provost Marshal, BAOR]
  - 3rd Infantry Brigade, at Drumadd Barracks, Armagh – HQ reformed in 1988
    - 203 Signal Squadron, Royal Corps of Signals, at Drummad Barracks, Armagh
    - 1st Battalion, Worcestershire and Sherwood Foresters, at Lisanelly Barracks, Omagh (Mechanised Infantry (Wheeled), 43 x Saracen APCs and 8 x Fox Armoured Cars)
      - Band of the Worcestershire and Sherwood Foresters (Small Infantry Band)
    - 2nd (County Armagh) Battalion, Ulster Defence Regiment, at Drumadd Barracks, Armagh
    - 3rd (County Down) Battalion, Ulster Defence Regiment, in Ballykinler
    - 4th (County Fermanagh) Battalion, Ulster Defence Regiment, at Grosvenor Barracks, Enniskillen
  - 8th Infantry Brigade, at Ebrington Barracks, Derry (covering County Londonderry, County Tyrone, and Ballymena, Ballymoney, Moyle and Northern Larne)
    - 208 Signal Squadron, Royal Corps of Signals, at Ebrington Barracks, Derry
    - Royal Hampshire Regiment, at Ebrington Barracks, Derry (Mechanised Infantry (Wheeled), 43 x Saracen APCs and 8 x Fox Armoured Cars) – from March
      - 570 Signal Troop, Royal Corps of Signals
      - Band of the Royal Hampshire Regiment (Small Infantry Band)
    - Gloucestershire Regiment, at Shackleton Barracks, Ballykelly (Light Infantry, 15 x 4 ton Bedford trucks, 61 x B-class vehicles 8 x 81 mm Mortars and 6 x Milan Anti-Tank)
      - 571 Signal Troop, Royal Corps of Signals
      - Band of the Gloucestershire Regiment (Small Infantry Band)
    - 1st/9th (County Antrim) Battalion, Ulster Defence Regiment, at Steeple Barracks, Antrim
    - 5th (County Londonderry) Battalion, Ulster Defence Regiment, at Shackleton Barracks, Ballykelly
    - 6th (County Tyrone) Battalion, Ulster Defence Regiment, at Saint Lucia Barracks, Omagh
    - 8th (County Tyrone) Battalion, Ulster Defence Regiment, in Dungannon
    - 176 Provost Company, Royal Military Police, at Ebrington Barracks, Derry [to Provost Marshal, BAOR]
  - 39th Infantry Brigade, Lisburn, (covering Belfast city, and County Armagh, County Down and County Antrim (excluding Ballymena, Ballymoney, Moyle and Northern Larne))
    - 213 Signal Squadron, Royal Corps of Signals, at Thiepval Barracks, Lisburn
    - 3rd Battalion, The Queen's Regiment, at Alexander Barracks, Aldergrove (Mechanised Infantry (Wheeled), 43 x Saracen APCs and 8 x Fox Armoured Cars)
      - 569 Signal Troop, Royal Corps of Signals
    - The Black Watch (Royal Highland Regiment), at Abercorn Barracks, Ballykinler (Resident Battalion) (Light Infantry, 15 x 4 ton Bedford trucks, 61 x B-class vehicles 8 x 81 mm Mortars and 6 x Milan Anti-Tank) – arrived in July from Berlin
      - 572 Signal Troop, Royal Corps of Signals
      - Band of the Black Watch (Small Infantry Band)
    - 3rd Battalion, The Parachute Regiment, at Palace Barracks, Belfast (Parachute Infantry) [to 5th Airborne Brigade] (Note: On roulement deployment from February 1989 to February 1991.)
    - 4th (Volunteer) Battalion (North Irish Militia), Royal Irish Rangers (V), in Portadown (Light Infantry) [TTW to 1st Garrison Area, Milan Platoon to 2nd Infantry Division]
    - 5th (Volunteer) Battalion, Royal Irish Rangers (V), in Armagh (Light Infantry) [TTW to 4th Garrison Area, Milan Platoon to 2nd Infantry Division]
    - 7th/10th (City of Belfast) Battalion, Ulster Defence Regiment, at Malone Barracks, Belfast
    - 11th (Craigavon) Battalion, Ulster Defence Regiment, at Mahon Barracks, Portadown
    - 33 Independent Field Squadron, Royal Engineers, at Massereene Barracks, Antrim (Note: Based on the shore of Lough Neagh operating the high-speed Rigid raider patrol boats used to intercept suspect craft. (Beevor, p. 378.))
    - 175 Provost Company, Royal Military Police, at Thiepval Barracks, Lisburn [to Provost Marshal, BAOR]
  - 107th (Ulster) Brigade (V), at Thiepval Barracks, Lisburn – 107th (Ulster) Brigade was formed in 1988 as an administrative HQ to coordinate the TA units in Northern Ireland. However, it did not become a field formation until the mid-1990s.
  - Northern Ireland Regiment AAC, AAC Aldergrove
    - No. 655 Squadron AAC, AAC Ballykelly, (to 2nd Infantry Division, 4x Gazelle AH.1, 12x Lynx AH.7)
    - No. 665 Squadron AAC, (16x Gazelle AH.1)
    - No. 1 Flight AAC, (Reconnaissance, 5x Islander AL.1)

== British Army of the Rhine ==
The British Army of the Rhine (BAOR) was the United Kingdom's main contribution to NATO. Headquartered at JHQ Rheindahlen in West Germany and commanded by a General it consisted in peacetime of British I Corps and support troops. In the event of war with the Warsaw Pact the Commander-in-Chief of BAOR would have assumed command of NATO's Northern Army Group (NORTHAG), which was tasked with defending Northern Germany up to the river Elbe. BAOR was armed with tactical nuclear weapons and supported by Royal Air Force Germany.

During transition to war, the support units of BAOR would have formed the British Rear Combat Zone headquartered in Düsseldorf, which would have supplied the fighting forces and guarded the lines of communication within West Germany. Further West in Belgium was the British Communications Zone, which was headquartered in Emblem, outside Antwerp and tasked with receiving reinforcements and supplies from Great Britain and to co-ordinate their onward movement to 1 (BR) Corps.

On 27 November 1989 Peter Inge became the commander of NATO's Northern Army Group and Commander-in-Chief, British Army of the Rhine in Germany with the local rank of general; he succeeded General Brian Kenny.

- British Army of the Rhine, JHQ Rheindahlen, Federal Republic of Germany
  - No. 12 Flight AAC, RAF Wildenrath, (Gazelle AH.1)
  - Commander Engineers BAOR, JHQ Rheindahlen
    - 40th Army Engineer Support Group, Royal Engineers, Willich
    - 10th Field Squadron (Airfields), 38th Engineer Regiment, Royal Engineers, RAF Gütersloh, (Forward deployed, 24x FV432, 12x Spartan, 9x engineer vehicles)
    - 14th Independent Topographic Squadron, Royal Engineers, Ratingen
    - 52nd Field Squadron (Construction), 22nd Engineer Regiment, Royal Engineers, RAF Bruggen, (Forward deployed)
    - 516th Specialist Team (Bulk Petrol), Royal Engineers, RAF Gütersloh
  - Commander Postal & Courier Service BAOR, Royal Engineers, JHQ Rheindahlen
    - 1st Postal & Courier Regiment, Royal Engineers, Hannover (in support of 1 (BR) Corps)
      - 11th Postal & Courier Squadron, Royal Engineers, Verden (in support of 1st (BR) Armoured Division)
      - 13th Postal & Courier Squadron, Royal Engineers, Soest (in support of 3rd (BR) Armoured Division)
      - 14th Postal & Courier Squadron, Royal Engineers, Herford (in support of 4th (BR) Armoured Division)
    - 3rd Postal & Courier Depot, Royal Engineers, Düsseldorf (in support of Communication Zone [CommZ])
    - 4th (NATO) Postal & Courier Regiment, Royal Engineers, Brunssum, Belgium (in support of SHAPE)
    - Berlin Postal and Courier Troop, Royal Engineers Berlin (in support of British Sector Berlin)
  - Commander Communications BAOR, JHQ Rheindahlen
    - 4th Signal Group, JHQ Rheindahlen
      - 13th Radio Signal Regiment, Royal Signals, Mercury Barracks, BAOR's Signals Intelligence unit, one squadron at RAF Gatow in West Berlin
      - 16th (British Army of the Rhine) Signal Regiment, Royal Signals, Bradbury Barracks
      - 21st Air Support Signal Regiment Royal Corps of Signals, RAF Wildenrath, supports Royal Air Force Germany/2 ATAF
      - 608th Signal Troop (Cipher Equipment), Royal Signals, Viersen
      - Signal Works Service Troops
    - NORTHAG Signal Support Group, JHQ Rheindahlen
      - 28 Signal Regiment (NORTHAG), Royal Signals, Sankt Tönis
      - 227 Signal Squadron (AFCENT), Royal Signals, Maastricht, Belgium
      - 228 Signal Squadron (SHAPE), Royal Signals, Mons, Belgium
      - 641st Signal Troop 2 ATAF, Royal Signals, JHQ Rheindahlen
  - Commander Transport & Movements BAOR, Düsseldorf
    - 68th Transport Squadron, Royal Corps of Transport, JHQ Rheindahlen
    - HQ 2nd Transport Group, Royal Corps of Transport, Düsseldorf
      - 79th Railway Squadron, Royal Corps of Transport, Mönchengladbach, (17x Locomotives, 265x Rolling Stock)
      - 71st Movement Control Squadron, Royal Corps of Transport, Mönchengladbach
      - Joint Helicopter Support Unit (Germany), Gütersloh, joint RAF/Army unit supporting No. 18 Squadron's CH-47 Chinook HC.1 helicopters
    - HQ Communications Zone, Royal Corps of Transport , Antwerp, Belgium
      - 602nd Transport Unit, Royal Corps of Transport, Antwerp, Belgium
  - Commander Medical BAOR, Düsseldorf
    - Commander Medical Rear Communication Zone, Düsseldorf
      - 31 General Hospital, Royal Army Medical Corps, Iserlohn
      - 82nd Field Medical Equipment Depot, Royal Army Medical Corps, Düsseldorf
      - 382nd Field Medical Company, Royal Army Medical Corps
    - Commander Medical Communication Zone, Antwerp, Belgium
  - Commander Supply BAOR, Düsseldorf
    - 3rd Base Ammo Depot, Royal Army Ordnance Corps, Bracht
    - 221st (BAOR) EOD Company, Royal Army Ordnance Corps, Herford
    - Communications Zone Ordnance Depot, Antwerp, Belgium
    - 15th Ordnance Group, Royal Army Ordnance Corps, Dulmen
      - Forward Stores Depot, Royal Army Ordnance Corps, Dulmen
      - Forward Vehicle Depot, Royal Army Ordnance Corps, Recklinghausen
      - 4th Petrol Depot, Royal Army Ordnance Corps, Warendorf
      - 154th Forward Ammo Depot, Royal Army Ordnance Corps, Wulfen
  - Commander Maintenance BAOR, Mönchengladbach
    - Rear Combat Zone:
      - 23rd Base Workshop, Royal Electrical and Mechanical Engineers, Wetter
      - 37th (Rhine) Workshop, Royal Electrical and Mechanical Engineers, Mönchengladbach
      - 62nd Rear Combat Zone Workshop, Royal Electrical and Mechanical Engineers, Mönchengladbach
      - 64th Rear Combat Zone Workshop, Royal Electrical and Mechanical Engineers, Willich
    - Communications Zone:
      - 60th Communications Zone Workshop, Royal Electrical and Mechanical Engineers, Antwerp, Belgium
    - Theatre Units in 1 (BR) Corps Area:
      - 57th Station Workshop, Royal Electrical and Mechanical Engineers, Paderborn
      - 58th Station Workshop, Royal Electrical and Mechanical Engineers, Minden
      - 61st Station Workshop, Royal Electrical and Mechanical Engineers, Dortmund
      - 63rd Station Workshop, Royal Electrical and Mechanical Engineers, Hannover
  - Provost Marshal BAOR, JHQ Rheindahlen
    - Special Investigations Branch (Germany), JHQ Rheindahlen
    - 101st Provost Company, Royal Military Police, Düsseldorf
    - 102nd Provost Company, Royal Military Police, JHQ Rheindahlen
  - HQ Intelligence & Security Group (Germany), JHQ Rheindahlen
    - 2nd Intelligence Company, Intelligence Corps, JHQ Rheindahlen
    - 4th Security Company, Intelligence Corps, Düsseldorf
    - 5th Security Company, Intelligence Corps, Hannover
    - 6th Intelligence Company (Photo Intell), Intelligence Corps, JHQ Rheindahlen
    - 7th Intelligence Company, Intelligence Corps, Bielefeld
    - Recce Intelligence Centre (Gütersloh), Intelligence Corps, RAF Gütersloh
    - Recce Intelligence Centre (Laarbruch), Intelligence Corps, RAF Laarbruch

=== I British Corps ===
The area 1 BR Corps had to defend lay between Hanover to the North and Kassel to the South and extended from the Inner German Border to the Upper Weser Valley. In case of a war the Corps first line of defense would have been a screening force of 1st The Queen's Dragoon Guards, 16th/5th Queen's Royal Lancers and 664 Squadron AAC, which would have become an ad-hoc brigade formation under command of BAOR's Brigadier Royal Armoured Corps. Behind the screening force 1st Armoured and 4th Armoured Division would form up. 3rd Armoured Division was to the rear of the two forward deployed division as reserve. 2nd Infantry Division was to defend the Corps Rear Area and prepare a last line of defense along the Western bank of the Weser river.

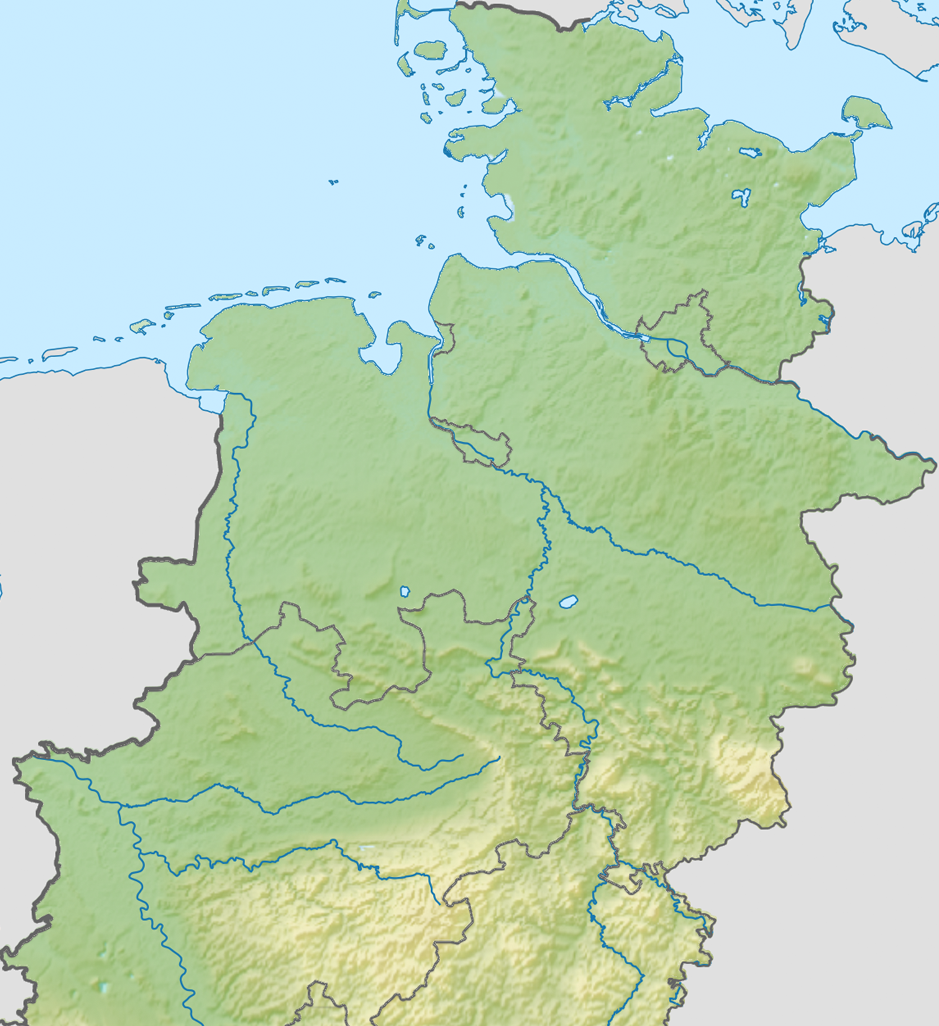
I British Corps units 1989:
I Corps HQ Armoured Division Armoured Brigade Artillery Brigade
Royal Air Force Germany bases:
Tornado GR.1 Harrier GR.5 Phantom FGR.2
- I British Corps, Bielefeld
  - I (BR) Corps HQ Defence Company, Royal Pioneer Corps, Bielefeld
  - Brigadier Royal Armoured Corps (to form HQ Screening Force on mobilisation)
  - Commander Royal Artillery 1 (BR) Corps, Bielefeld
    - 1st Artillery Brigade, Dortmund (In war, 1 Arty Bde formed two Gen Sp Groups which each consist one hvy regt (MLRS/Loc) and one FH70 (less F00 ptys). FH70 regts are based in UK)
      - 5th Heavy Regiment, Royal Artillery, Dortmund (4th Armoured Division)
      - 32 Heavy Regiment, Royal Artillery, Dortmund (supports 1st Armoured Division)
      - 39 Heavy Regiment, Royal Artillery, Sennelager (to support 3rd Armoured Division, re-equipping with MLRS)
      - 50 Missile Regiment, Royal Artillery, Menden (Tactical Missiles)
      - 6th Air Defence Regiment, Royal Horse Artillery (originally slated to form in 1990–3 with new HVM system)
      - 12 Air Defence Regiment, Royal Artillery, Dortmund (2 tracked and 2 Blindfire (towed) rapier systems)
      - 22 Air Defence Regiment, Royal Artillery, Dortmund (2 tracked and 2 Blindfire (towed) rapier systems)
      - 8 Artillery Support Regiment RLC, Royal Corps of Transport, Portsmouth Barracks, Münster, supports Heavy and Missile Regiments
  - Commander Royal Engineers 1 (BR) Corps, Bielefeld
    - 23 Engineer Regiment, Royal Engineers, Roberts Barracks, Osnabrück
    - 25 Engineer Regiment, Royal Engineers, Roberts Barracks, Osnabrück
    - 28 Amphibious Engineer Regiment, Royal Engineers, Bindon Barracks (Amphibious Crossings)
    - 32 Armoured Engineer Regiment, Royal Engineers, Munsterlager
    - 43 Plant Squadron, Royal Engineers, Osnabrück
    - 65 Corps Support Squadron, Royal Engineers, Hameln, (20x M2 Amphibious Rigs)
    - Corps Lighting Troop, Royal Engineers, Herford
    - 211 Mobile Civilian Artisan Group, Royal Engineers, Horrocks Barracks, Schloss Neuhaus
    - 256 Mobile Civilian Plant Group, Royal Engineers, Hannover
    - 1st Postal & Courier Regiment, Royal Engineers, Hannover
  - Commander Aviation BAOR and 1 (BR) Corps, Bielefeld
    - No.1 Wing, Army Air Corps, Hobart Barracks in Detmold, West Germany, (Wing disbanded in 1989)
      - 664 Squadron Army Air Corps, St George's Barracks in Minden, (Reconnaissance, 12x Gazelle AH.1)
      - 1 Regiment Army Air Corps, Tofrek Barracks in Hildesheim, supported 1st Armoured Division
      - 3 Regiment Army Air Corps, Salamanca Barracks in Soest, supported 3rd Armoured Division
      - 4 Regiment Army Air Corps, Hobart Barracks in Detmold, supported 4th Armoured Division
  - Commander Communications 1 (BR) Corps, Bielefeld
    - 7th Signal Regiment, Royal Signals, Herford
    - 14 Signal Regiment (Electronic Warfare), Royal Signals, Celle
    - 22 Signal Regiment, Royal Signals, Churchill Barracks
  - Commander Transport 1 (BR) Corps, Bielefeld
    - 7th Tank Transporter Regiment, Royal Corps of Transport, Sennelager
    - 10 Corps Transport Regiment, Royal Corps of Transport, Bielefeld
    - 24 Transport & Movement Regiment, Royal Corps of Transport, Hanover
    - 25 Transport & Movement Regiment, Royal Corps of Transport, Bielefeld
    - 14 Corps Support Squadron, Royal Corps of Transport, Bielefeld
  - Commander Medical 1 (BR) Corps, Bielefeld
    - 21 Field Hospital, Royal Army Medical Corps, Rinteln
    - 32 Field Hospital, Royal Army Medical Corps, Hannover
    - 83 Field Medical Equipment Depot, Royal Army Medical Corps, Hannover
  - Commander Supply 1 (BR) Corps, Bielefeld
    - 5 Ordnance Battalion, Royal Army Ordnance Corps, Paderborn
    - 6 Ordnance Battalion, Royal Army Ordnance Corps, Bielefeld
    - 2 Aircraft Support Unit, Royal Army Ordnance Corps, Detmold
  - Commander Maintenance 1 (BR) Corps, Bielefeld
    - 1st (BR) Corps Troops Workshop, Royal Electrical and Mechanical Engineers, Bielefeld
    - 20 Electronics Workshop, Royal Electrical and Mechanical Engineers, Minden
    - 71 Aircraft Workshop, Royal Electrical and Mechanical Engineers, Detmold
  - Provost Marshal 1 (BR) Corps, Bielefeld
    - 110 Provost Company, Royal Military Police, Sennelager
    - 115 Provost Company, Royal Military Police, Osnabrück

==== 1st Armoured Division ====
1st Armoured Division was the corps' Northern forward deployed division.

- 1st Armoured Division, Verden
  - HQ 1st Armoured Division & Signal Regiment, Royal Signals, Verden
  - 1st The Queen's Dragoon Guards, Wolfenbüttel (Armoured reconnaissance, to join Screening Force on mobilisation)
  - 21st Engineer Regiment, Royal Engineers, Nienburg
  - 11th Postal & Courier Squadron, Royal Engineers, Verden
  - 1st Armoured Division Transport Regiment, Royal Corps of Transport, Bunde
  - 1st Ordnance Battalion, Royal Army Ordnance Corps, Verden
  - 7th Armoured Workshop, Royal Electrical and Mechanical Engineers, Fallingbostel
  - 12th Armoured Workshop, Royal Electrical and Mechanical Engineers, Osnabrück
  - 1st Armoured Field Ambulance, Royal Army Medical Corps, Bergen-Hohne
  - 2nd Armoured Field Ambulance, Royal Army Medical Corps, Osnabrück
  - 111th Provost Company, Royal Military Police, Bergen-Hohne
  - 7th Armoured Brigade, Soltau
    - HQ 7th Armoured Brigade & 207th Signal Squadron, Royal Signals, Soltau
    - Royal Scots Dragoon Guards, Fallingbostel, (Armoured (Tanks))
    - 2nd Royal Tank Regiment, Fallingbostel, (Armoured (Tanks))
    - 1st Battalion, Staffordshire Regiment (Prince of Wales's), Fallingbostel, (Armoured Infantry)
  - 12th Armoured Brigade, Osnabrück
    - HQ 12th Armoured Brigade & 212th Signal Squadron, Royal Signals, Osnabrück
    - 4th Royal Tank Regiment, Osnabrück, (Armoured (Tanks))
    - 1st Battalion, Royal Irish Rangers, Osnabrück, (Armoured Infantry)
    - 1st Battalion, Royal Green Jackets, Osnabrück, (Armoured Infantry)
  - 22nd Armoured Brigade, Bergen-Hohne
    - HQ 22nd Armoured Brigade & 201st Signal Squadron, Royal Signals, Bergen-Hohne
    - Queen's Own Hussars, Bergen-Hohne (Armoured (Tanks))
    - 1st Royal Tank Regiment, Hildesheim (Armoured (Tanks))
    - 1st Battalion, Scots Guards, Bergen-Hohne (Mechanised Infantry)
    - 2nd Battalion, Royal Anglian Regiment, Celle (Mechanised Infantry)
  - Commander Royal Artillery 1st Armoured Division, Bergen-Hohne
    - 1st Field Regiment, Royal Horse Artillery, Bergen-Hohne (Field artillery, supports 22 Armd Bde)
    - 4th Field Regiment, Royal Artillery, Osnabrück (Field artillery, supports 12 Armd Bde)
    - 40th Field Regiment, Royal Artillery, Bergen-Hohne (Field artillery, supports 7 Armd Bde)
      - 10 (Assaye) Air Defence Battery (under command of Field regiment for admin)

==== 3rd Armoured Division ====
3rd Armoured Division was the corps' reserve formation.

- 3rd Armoured Division, Soest
  - HQ 3rd Armoured Division & Signal Regiment, Royal Signals, Soest
  - 9th/12th Royal Lancers (Prince of Wales's), Carver Barracks (Colchester UK), (Armoured reconnaissance)
  - 26th Engineer Regiment, Royal Engineers, Corunna Barracks
  - 13th Postal & Courier Squadron, Royal Engineers, Soest
  - 3rd Armoured Division Transport Regiment, Royal Corps of Transport, Duisburg
  - 3rd Ordnance Battalion, Royal Army Ordnance Corps, Soest
  - 5th Armoured Workshop, Royal Electrical and Mechanical Engineers, Soest
  - 6th Armoured Workshop, Royal Electrical and Mechanical Engineers, Münster
  - 11th Armoured Workshop, Royal Electrical and Mechanical Engineers, Soest
  - 3rd Armoured Field Ambulance, Royal Army Medical Corps, Sennelager
  - 5th Armoured Field Ambulance, Royal Army Medical Corps, Münster
  - 113th Provost Company, Royal Military Police, Werl
  - 4th Armoured Brigade, Münster
    - HQ 4th Armoured Brigade & 204 Signal Squadron, Royal Signals, Münster
    - 14th/20th King's Hussars, Münster, (Armoured (Tanks)), one squadron detached to Berlin Infantry Brigade
    - 17th/21st Lancers, Münster, (Armoured (Tanks)), one squadron detached to British Forces Cyprus
    - 1st Battalion, Grenadier Guards, Oxford Barracks, Münster (Armoured Infantry)
  - 6th Armoured Brigade, Soest
    - HQ 6th Armoured Brigade & 206th Signal Squadron, Royal Signals, Soest
    - 3rd Royal Tank Regiment, Hemer, (Armoured (Tanks))
    - 1st Battalion, Royal Scots (The Royal Regiment), Werl, (Armoured Infantry)
    - 3rd Battalion, Royal Regiment of Fusiliers, Hemer, (Armoured Infantry)
  - 33rd Armoured Brigade, Paderborn
    - HQ 33rd Armoured Brigade & 202nd Signal Squadron, Royal Signals, Paderborn
    - Blues and Royals, Sennelager, (Armoured (Tanks))
    - 1st Battalion, Queen's Own Highlanders, Münster, (Mechanised Infantry)
    - 1st Battalion, Queen's Lancashire Regiment, Paderborn, (Mechanised Infantry)
  - Commander Royal Artillery 3rd Armoured Division, Münster
    - 2nd Field Regiment, Royal Artillery, Münster, (Self-Propelled Field Artillery)
      - 46th (Talavera) Air Defence Battery, (36x Javelin)
    - 3rd Field Regiment, Royal Horse Artillery, Paderborn, (Self-Propelled Field Artillery)
    - 49th Field Regiment, Royal Artillery, Lippstadt, (Self-Propelled Field Artillery)

==== 4th Armoured Division ====
4th Armoured Division was the corps' Southern forward deployed division. As the division's area of operation was hilly and woody 19th Infantry Brigade based in Colchester was added to it.

- 4th Armoured Division, Herford, FRG
  - HQ 4th Armoured Division & Signal Regiment, Royal Signals, Herford
  - 16th/5th Queen's Royal Lancers, Herford, (Armoured Reconnaissance)
  - 35th Engineer Regiment, Royal Engineers, Gordon Barracks
  - 14th Postal & Courier Squadron, Royal Engineers, Herford
  - 4th Armoured Division Transport Regiment, Royal Corps of Transport, Minden
  - 4th Ordnance Battalion, Royal Army Ordnance Corps, Herford
  - 4th Armoured Workshop, Royal Electrical and Mechanical Engineers, Detmold
  - 4th Armoured Field Ambulance, Royal Army Medical Corps, Minden
  - 114th Provost Company, Royal Military Police, Detmold
  - 11th Armoured Brigade, Minden, FRG
    - HQ 11th Armoured Brigade & 211th Signal Squadron, Royal Signals, Minden
    - 5th Royal Inniskilling Dragoon Guards, Paderborn, (Armoured (Tanks))
    - 1st Battalion, Argyll and Sutherland Highlanders, Minden, (Mechanised Infantry)
    - 2nd Battalion, Queen's Regiment, Minden, (Mechanised Infantry)
  - 20th Armoured Brigade, Detmold, FRG
    - HQ 20th Armoured Brigade & 200th Signal Squadron, Royal Signals, Detmold
    - 4th/7th Royal Dragoon Guards, Detmold, (Armoured (Tanks))
    - 15th/19th King's Royal Hussars, Detmold, (Armoured (Tanks))
    - 2nd Battalion, Royal Irish Rangers, Lemgo, (Mechanised Infantry)
  - Commander Royal Artillery 4th Armoured Division, Paderborn
    - 19th Field Regiment, Royal Artillery, Dortmund, (Self-Propelled Field Artillery)
    - 26th Field Regiment, Royal Artillery, Gütersloh, (Self-Propelled Field Artillery)
      - 43 (Lloyd's Company) Air Defence Battery, (36x Javelin)

=== British Sector Berlin ===
- HQ Berlin
  - Berlin Postal and Courier Troop, Royal Engineers
  - 3rd Squadron, 13th Signal Regiment (Radio), Royal Signals, Signals Intelligence at RAF Gatow
  - 3rd Intelligence and Security Company, Intelligence Corps
  - 7 Flight AAC, RAF Gatow, (4x Gazelle AH.1)
  - Royal Air Force Gatow Station Flight, (2x Chipmunk T10)
  - No. 26 Signals Unit, Royal Air Force, (Signals intelligence at RAF Gatow and Teufelsberg)
  - British Military Hospital Berlin
  - 62nd Transport & Movements Squadron, Royal Corps of Transport
  - 14th (Berlin) Field Workshop, Royal Electrical and Mechanical Engineers
  - Berlin Ordnance Company, Royal Army Ordnance Corps
  - 504th Commander Royal Army Service Corps (CRASC) (Overseas Deployment Training)
  - Detachment, 2nd Independent Petrol Platoon, Royal Army Service Corps
  - Detachment, 164 Railway Operations Company, Royal Engineers
  - 2nd Regiment, Royal Military Police
    - 246th (Berlin) Provost Company, Royal Military Police, in Helmstedt, (manned Checkpoint Alpha)
    - 247th (Berlin) Provost Company, Royal Military Police, (manned Checkpoint Bravo and Checkpoint Charlie)
    - 248th German Security Unit, support unit with German personnel
  - Berlin Infantry Brigade
    - Berlin Infantry Brigade HQ & (29th) Signal Regiment, Royal Signals
    - C Squadron, 14th/20th King's Hussars, Smuts Barracks (Armoured (Tanks))
    - 1st Battalion, King's Regiment, Wavell Barracks, (replaced by 1st Battalion, Irish Guards December 1989)
    - 1st Battalion, The Light Infantry, Brooks Barracks
    - 1st Battalion, Royal Welch Fusiliers, Montgomery Barracks
    - 38th (Berlin) Field Squadron, Royal Engineers
    - 6 Troop, 46 (Talavera) Air Defence Battery, 2nd Field Regiment, Royal Artillery, (12x Javelin)

== Overseas Forces ==
The Defence Operations Executive, led by the Deputy Chief of the Defence Staff (Commitments) and including the Assistant Chiefs of the Naval, General, and Air Staffs, supervised the Joint Operations Centre which in turn passed orders to the forces in Cyprus, Belize, the Falklands, and Hong Kong. These commands consisted of units of all three services and were commanded by one or 2-star rank flag officers. CBF Cyprus was a rotational post between the Army and RAF, at two-star level; CBF Belize was an Army brigadier; CBF Falklands was a rotational post between all three services at two-star level; and CBF Hong Kong was an Army major general.(Copied from the Structure of the British Armed Forces in 1989).

- British Forces Belize Price Barracks, Ladyville
  - 1x Armoured Reconnaissance Troop, six month roulement
  - 1st Battalion, Welsh Guards, six month roulement from April to October 1989
  - 1x Field Battery, Royal Artillery, six month roulement
  - 1x Field Squadron, Royal Engineers, six month roulement
  - Detachment 2 Postal and Courier Regiment, Royal Engineers
  - 24 Squadron, Royal Corps of Transport
  - 78 Ordnance Company, Royal Army Ordnance Corps
  - 25 Flight AAC, Belize Airport, Ladyville, (Gazelle AH.1)
- British Forces Brunei (Seria, Brunei)
  - HQ British Forces Brunei & Brunei Signal Troop, Queen's Gurkha Signals
  - 1st Battalion, 10th Princess Mary's Own Gurkha Rifles
  - Brunei Troop, Gurkha Transport Regiment
  - C Flight, 660 Squadron AAC, Anduki Airfield, (Scout AH.1)
  - Detachment 24 Postal and Courier Squadron, Royal Engineers
- British Forces Cyprus, Episkopi
  - 9th Signal Regiment (Radio), Royal Signals, at Ayios Nikolaos Signals Intelligence station
  - 259 (West) Signal Squadron (responsible for communications in the west of the island)
    - SHQ and Episkopi Troop, Episkopi
    - Akrotiri Troop
    - Dhekelia Troop
  - 262 Signal Squadron Royal Corps of Signals, Dhekalia (responsible for communications in the east of the island)
  - B Squadron, 17th/21st Lancers, Episkopi, six month roulement
  - 2nd Battalion, Coldstream Guards, Salamanca Barracks, two-year deployment: February 1988 to February 1990 (in Wellington Barracks until February)
  - 62 Cyprus Support Squadron, Royal Engineers, Dhekelia
  - 23 Postal and Courier Squadron, Royal Engineers, Dhekelia
  - 30th Transport Regiment, Royal Corps of Transport, Episkopi
  - 16 Flight AAC, Kingsfield Airfield in Dhekelia, (Gazelle AH.1)
  - UNFICYP Flight AAC, Nicosia Airport, (Gazelle AH.1, supported the United Nations Peacekeeping Force in Cyprus)
- British Forces Falklands, RAF Mount Pleasant
  - Infantry company from 1st Battalion, Cheshire Regiment, six month roulement April to October 1989; replaced by infantry company from 1st Battalion, Green Howards
  - 1x Artillery Battery, Royal Artillery, six month roulement (6x L118 Light Guns)
  - 1x Air Defence Troop, Royal Artillery, six month roulement, (12x Javelin)
  - 1x Field Squadron, Royal Engineers, six month roulement
  - Falkland Islands Postal and Courier Troop, Royal Engineers
  - 67th Port Squadron, Royal Corps of Transport
  - 73rd Squadron, Royal Corps of Transport
  - 77th Ordnance Company, Royal Army Ordnance Corps
- Gibraltar Garrison
  - Fortress Postal and Courier Troop, Royal Engineers
  - 3rd Battalion, Royal Green Jackets, arrived in January 1989 for a two-year deployment
  - Gibraltar Regiment (V), four reserve infantry companies, one artillery battery (6x L118 light guns), one air-defense troop (8x Blowpipe missile systems)
- British Forces Hong Kong, Prince of Wales building
  - 247 Gurkha Signal Squadron Royal Corps of Signals
  - The Queen's Gukha Engineer Regiment Corps of Royal Engineers
  - 24 Postal and Courier Squadron, Royal Engineers
  - The Gurkha Transport Regiment Royal Corps of Transport
  - 415 Maritime Troop, Royal Corps of Transport
  - 50 Command Workshop, Royal Electrical and Mechanical Engineers
  - Hong Kong Provost Company & Hong Kong Dog Company, Royal Military Police
  - 660 Squadron AAC, RAF Sek Kong, (Scout AH.1, C Flight detached to British Forces Brunei)
  - British Military Hospital, Hong Kong
  - Hong Kong Military Service Corps
    - Defence Animal Support Unit, Royal Army Veterinary Corps
  - 48th Gurkha Infantry Brigade
    - HQ 48th Gurkha Infantry Brigade & 246 Gurkha Signal Squadron
    - 1st Battalion, Duke of Edinburgh's Royal Regiment, Stanley Fort
    - 1st Battalion, 6th Queen Elizabeth's Own Gurkha Rifles
    - 1st Battalion, 7th Duke of Edinburgh's Own Gurkha Rifles
    - 2nd Battalion, 2nd King Edward VII's Own Gurkha Rifles, Gallipoli Lines

== Miscellaneous support corps ==
=== Women's Royal Army Corps ===
- Women's Royal Army Corps

=== Small Arms School Corps ===
- Small Arms School Corps
  - Waterloo Lines. Warminster (Initial Selection and Training) – Known as "Phase 1"
  - Infantry Battle School, Brecon (Probation) – Known as "Phase 2"

=== Royal Army Chaplains' Department ===
- Royal Army Chaplains' Department

=== Army Legal Services Branch ===
- Army Legal Services Branch

=== Royal Army Veterinary Corps ===
- Royal Army Veterinary Corps

=== Royal Army Educational Corps ===
- Royal Army Educational Corps

=== Royal Army Physical Training Corps ===
- Royal Army Physical Training Corps

=== Royal Army Medical Corps ===
- Royal Army Medical Corps

=== Royal Army Dental Corps ===
- Royal Army Dental Corps

=== Military Provost Staff Corps ===
- Military Provost Staff Corps – The Provost Marshal also headed this corps.

=== Royal Army Ordnance Corps ===
- Royal Army Ordnance Corps

=== Queen Alexandra's Royal Army Nursing Corps ===
- Queen Alexandra's Royal Army Nursing Corps

== Inventories of equipment ==
=== Army Air Corps Inventory 1989 ===
The inventory of the Army Air Corps in 1989 consisted of the following aircraft:

- Helicopters:
  - 100+ Lynx AH.1/AH.7 (Conversion of last AH.1 to AH.7 underway)
  - Lynx AH.9 (24x on order)
  - 160+ Gazelle AH.1
  - 30+ Scout AH.1
  - 4x A.109A
- Fixed wing aircraft:
  - 5x Islander AL.1 (2x more on order)
  - 21x Chipmunk T.10
