= Outline of the British Armed Forces at the end of the Cold War =

The following is a hierarchical outline for the British Armed Forces at the end of the Cold War. It is intended to convey the connections and relationships between units and formations.

In 1989 the British Armed Forces had a peacetime strength of 311,600 men, and defence expenditures were 4.09% of GDP. The strength of the Royal Navy in 1989 was 65,500; that of the British Army: 152,800; and that of the Royal Air Force 93,300.

== Ministry of Defence ==
Within the MOD Main Building in London, the Ministry of Defence, through the Defence Council of the United Kingdom, supervised the Army Board, Admiralty Board, and the Air Force Board.

The Minister for Defence Procurement had political responsibility for the Ministry of Defence Procurement Executive, which supervised the Atomic Weapons Establishment at Aldermaston (including the Royal Ordnance Factories at ROF Burghfield and ROF Cardiff), as well as seven other research establishments. They included the Admiralty Research Establishment, Portsdown; the Aeroplane and Armament Experimental Establishment, RAF Boscombe Down; the Chemical Defence Establishment, Porton Down; the Microbiological Research Establishment, Porton Down; the Royal Armament Research and Development Establishment, Fort Halstead; the Royal Aircraft Establishment at RAE Farnborough and RAE Bedford; and the Royal Signals and Radar Establishment, at Malvern.

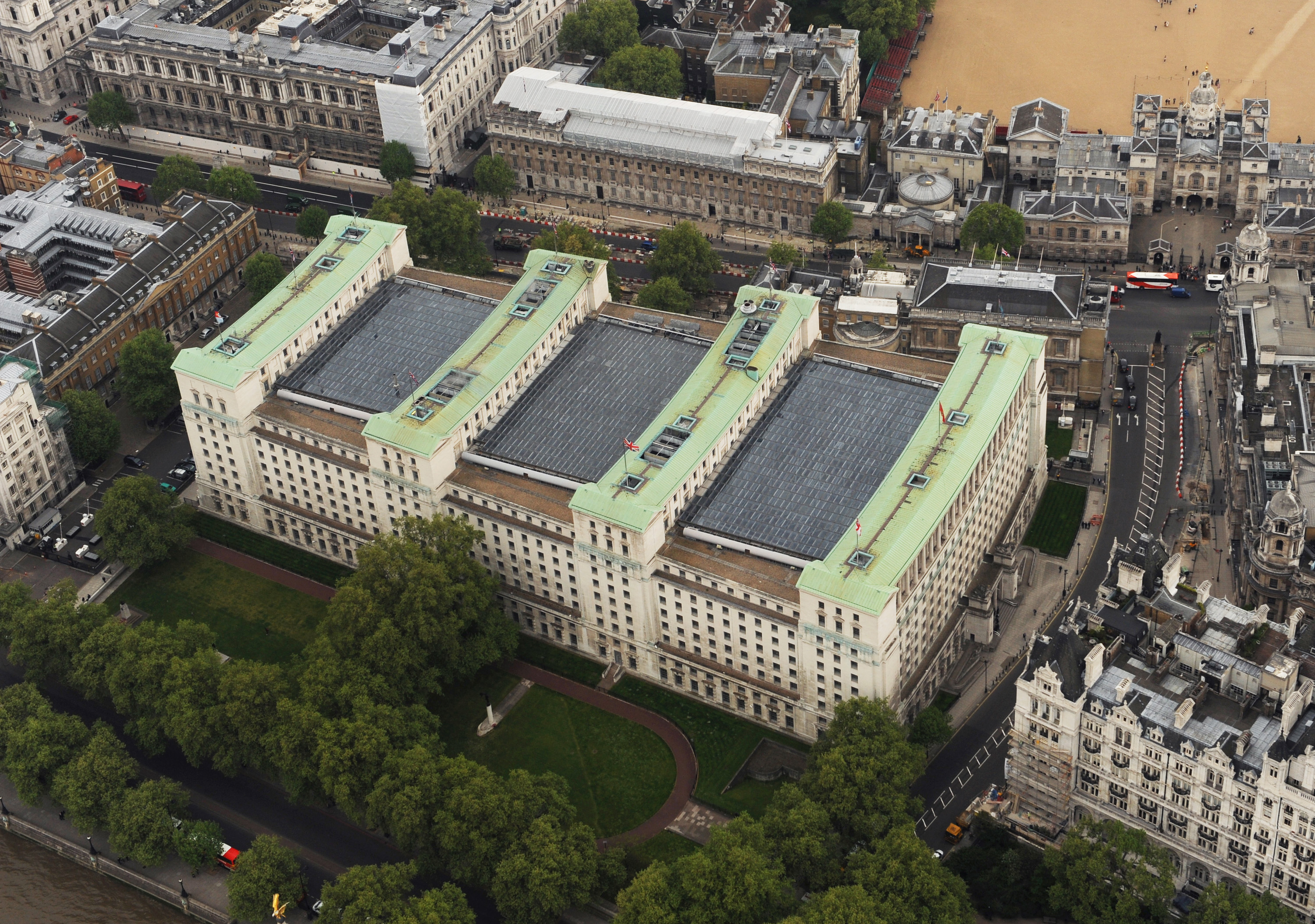
The Ministry of Defence building in Whitehall, Westminster, London

Other MoD organisations included:

- the Ministry of Defence Police
- the Judge Advocate General of the Armed Forces
- the Defence Nuclear, Biological and Chemical School, Winterbourne Gunner
- Defence Intelligence Staff
- Welbeck College, Worksop
- the Defence Test and Evaluation Organisation, Portland Bill
- the Chief Scientific Adviser to the Ministry of Defence
- and Defence Munitions depots at Crombie, Glen Douglas and Gosport.

== British Army forces in Brunei ==
- HQ British Forces Brunei & Brunei Signal Troop, Queen's Gurkha Signals (Seria, Brunei)
  - 1st Btn, 10th Princess Mary's Own Gurkha Rifles
  - C Flight, 660 Squadron AAC, Anduki Airfield, (Scout AH.1)
  - Brunei Troop, Gurkha Transport Regiment

== Director Special Forces ==
- Director Special Forces, commands United Kingdom Special Forces
  - Special Air Service, Stirling Lines, Hereford
    - HQ Special Air Service & 264 (SAS) Signal Squadron, Hereford
    - 22nd Special Air Service Regiment, Stirling Lines, Hereford
    - 8 Flight AAC, (4x A109A Hirundo), Stirling Lines, Hereford
  - Special Air Service Group, (Stay-behind Observation Posts and Long Range Reconnaissance Patrols for I British Corps)
    - 63 (SAS) Signal Squadron (V), Thorney Island
    - 21 Special Air Service Regiment (Artists) (V), Chelsea
    - 23 Special Air Service Regiment (V), Birmingham
  - Special Boat Service, Royal Marines, Poole
  - 14 Intelligence Company, British Army, RAF Aldergrove

== Joint establishments ==
Joint establishments were tri-service units providing services to all three branches of the British Armed Forces.

- Joint Service Defence College, Greenwich
- Joint Forward Air Controller Training and Standards Unit, RAF Leeming

== Defence Operations Executive ==
The Defence Operations Executive, led by the Deputy Chief of the Defence Staff (Commitments) and including the Assistant Chiefs of the Naval, General, and Air Staffs, supervised the Joint Operations Centre which in turn passed orders to the forces in Cyprus, Belize, the Falklands, and Hong Kong. These commands consisted of units of all three services and were commanded by one or 2-star rank flag officers. CBF Cyprus was a rotational post between the Army and RAF, at two-star level; CBF Belize was an Army brigadier; CBF Falklands was a rotational post between all three services at two-star level; and CBF Hong Kong was an Army major general.

- Joint Air Transport Establishment, RAF Brize Norton (under Commitments umbrella)

=== British Forces Belize ===
The Commander British Forces Belize was a British Army Brigadier.

- British Forces Belize, Belize City, Belize
  - British Army, Price Barracks, Ladyville
    - 1st Btn, Welsh Guards, six month roulement from April to October 1989
    - 1x Armoured Reconnaissance Troop, six month roulement
    - 1x Field Battery, Royal Artillery, six month roulement
    - 1x Field Squadron, Royal Engineers, six month roulement
    - 24th Squadron, Royal Corps of Transport
    - 78th Ordnance Company, Royal Army Ordnance Corps
    - 25 Flight AAC, Belize Airport, Ladyville, (Gazelle AH.1)
  - Royal Air Force, Belize Airport, Ladyville
    - No. 1417 Flight RAF, (Harrier GR.3)
    - No. 1563 Flight RAF, (Puma HC.1)
    - 1x Air Defence Troop, RAF Regiment, six month roulement, (2× Rapier launch stations)
  - Royal Navy
    - West Indies Guard Ship, as needed.

=== British Forces Cyprus ===
The post of Commander British Forces Cyprus rotated between British Army and Royal Navy 2-star rank flag officers (Major General and Rear admiral).

- British Forces Cyprus, Episkopi, Cyprus
  - HQ, British Forces Cyprus, Episkopi
  - British Army:
    - 2nd Btn, Coldstream Guards, Episkopi, two-year deployment: February 1988 to February 1990
    - 9th Signal Regiment (Radio), Royal Signals, at Ayios Nikolaos Signals Intelligence station
    - 30th Transport Regiment, Royal Corps of Transport, Episkopi
    - B Squadron, 17th/21st Lancers, Episkopi, six month roulement
    - 62nd Cyprus Support Squadron, Royal Engineers, Dhekelia
    - 259th Signal Squadron, Episkopi
    - 262nd Signal Squadron, Dhekelia
    - 16 Flight AAC, Kingsfield Airfield in Dhekelia, (Gazelle AH.1)
    - UNFICYP Flight AAC, Nicosia Airport, (Gazelle AH.1, supported the United Nations Peacekeeping Force in Cyprus)
  - Royal Air Force:
    - No. 84 Squadron RAF, RAF Akrotiri (Wessex HC.2)
    - No. 34 Squadron RAF Regiment, RAF Akrotiri, (Light Armour, 15× Spartan, 6× Scorpion)
    - No. 13 Signals Unit, RAF Episkopi
    - No. 33 Signals Unit, Ayios Nikolaos, (Signals intelligence)
    - No. 280 Signals Unit, RAF Troodos, (Signals intelligence)

=== British Forces Falkland Islands ===
The post of Commander British Forces Falkland Islands rotated between British Army, Royal Navy and Royal Air Force 2-star rank flag officers (either a Major General, Rear admiral or Air vice-marshal).

- British Forces Falkland Islands, RAF Mount Pleasant, Falkland Islands
  - HQ British Forces Falkland Islands & Joint Communications Unit Falklands Islands,
  - Joint Force Workshop, RAF Mount Pleasant
  - Falkland Islands Defence Force, Stanley
  - British Army, RAF Mount Pleasant
    - Infantry company from 1st Btn, Cheshire Regiment, six month roulement April to October 1989; replaced by infantry company from 1st Btn, Green Howards
    - 1x Artillery Battery, Royal Artillery, six month roulement (6x L118 Light Guns)
    - 1x Field Squadron, Royal Engineers, six month roulement
    - 1x Air Defence Troop, Royal Artillery, six month roulement, (12x Javelin)
    - 67th Port Squadron, Royal Corps of Transport
    - 73rd Squadron, Royal Corps of Transport
    - 77th Ordnance Company, Royal Army Ordnance Corps
  - Royal Air Force, RAF Mount Pleasant
    - No. 78 Squadron RAF, (Air assault CH-47 Chinook HC.1, Search & Rescue Sea King HAR.3)
    - No. 1435 Flight RAF, (Phantom FGR.2)
    - No. 1312 Flight RAF, (Aerial refueling Hercules C.1K)
    - No. 7 Signals Unit RAF, Byron Heights, West Falkland
    - No. 303 Signals Unit
    - No. 751 Signals Unit, Mount Alice (Falkland Islands)
    - 1x Air Defence Troop, RAF Regiment, six month roulement, (2× Rapier launch stations)
  - HMS Leeds Castle, Castle-class patrol vessel of the Royal Navy, based at Stanley with crew on a six-month roulement

=== British Forces Hong Kong ===
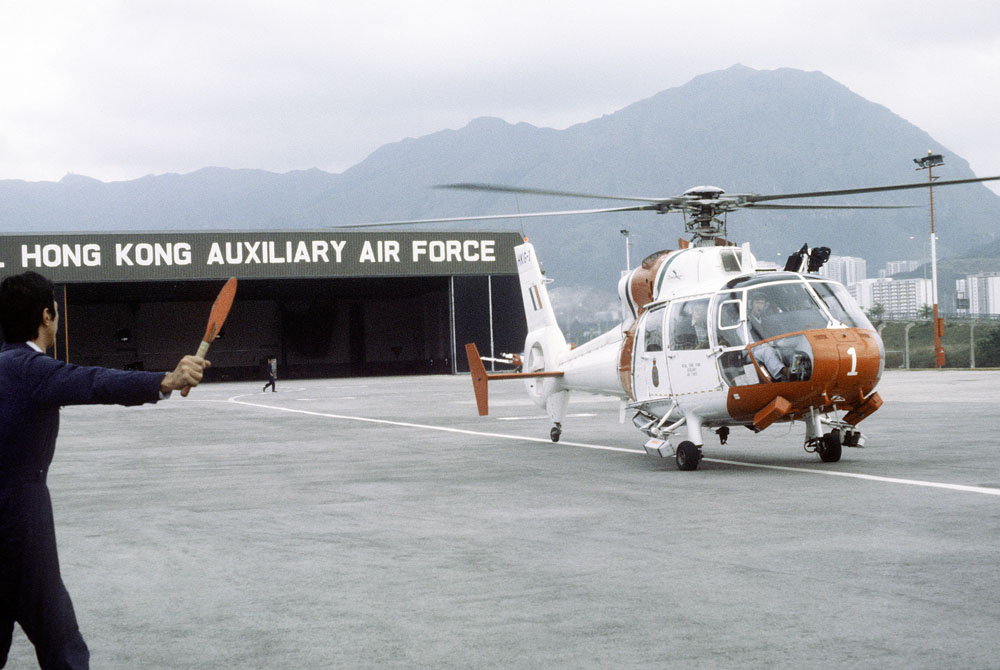
A Royal Hong Kong Auxiliary Air Force Aerospatiale Dauphin helicopter leaving its hangar during a Search and Rescue exercise in 1982.

The Commander British Forces Hong Kong was a British Army Major General.

- Commander British Forces Hong Kong, Hong Kong
  - HQ British Forces Hong Kong & 248th Gurkha Signal Squadron, Headquarters House
  - British Army, Prince of Wales Building
    - 48th Gurkha Infantry Brigade
      - HQ 48th Gurkha Infantry Brigade & 246th Gurkha Signal Squadron
      - 1st Btn, Duke of Edinburgh's Royal Regiment, Stanley Fort
      - 1st Btn, 6th Queen Elizabeth's Own Gurkha Rifles
      - 1st Btn, 7th Duke of Edinburgh's Own Gurkha Rifles
      - 2nd Btn, 2nd King Edward VII's Own Gurkha Rifles, Gallipoli Lines
    - Queen's Gurkha Signals
      - 247th Gurkha Signal Squadron
    - Queen's Gurkha Engineers
      - 67th Gurkha Field Squadron
      - 68th Gurkha Field Squadron
      - 70th Support Squadron
    - Gurkha Transport Regiment
      - 28th Gurkha Transport Squadron
      - 29th Transport Squadron
      - 31st Gurkha Transport Squadron
    - 660 Squadron AAC, RAF Sek Kong, (Scout AH.1, C Flight detached to British Forces Brunei)
    - 50th Command Workshop, Royal Electrical and Mechanical Engineers
    - Hong Kong Provost Company & Hong Kong Dog Company, Royal Military Police
    - 415th Maritime Troop, Royal Corps of Transport
    - British Military Hospital, Hong Kong
    - Hong Kong Military Service Corps
      - Defence Animal Support Unit, Royal Army Veterinary Corps
  - Commander Royal Air Force, RAF Sek Kong
    - No. 28 Squadron RAF, (8x Wessex HC.2)
  - Captain-in-Charge Royal Navy, HMS Tamar
    - Hong Kong Patrol Squadron, HMS Tamar with:
      - Peacock-class corvettes: HMS Peacock, HMS Plover, HMS Starling
    - Hong Kong Royal Naval Volunteer Reserve

The two local auxiliary defence forces were administered by the Hong Kong Government, but when mobilized for active service would have come under the command of the Commander British Forces:

- Royal Hong Kong Regiment (The Volunteers) (V)
- Royal Hong Kong Auxiliary Air Force, Kai Tak Airport, (4x T-67M-200 Firefly, 2x B200C King Air, 3x SA-365-C Dauphin 2, 1x BN-2 Islander)

== See also ==
- Outline of the British Army in 1989
- Structure of the Royal Navy in 1989
- Structure of the Royal Air Force in 1989
- Outline of military science and technology
