= 2nd Transport Regiment RCT =

2nd Division Transport Column 2nd Armoured Division Transport Regiment 2nd Infantry Division Transport Regiment
- Active: 1953–1984; 1985–1993
- Country: United Kingdom
- Branch: British Army
- Type: Divisional transport unit
- Role: Providing rear and close transportation services
- Size: Regiment
- Part of: 2nd Division
- Last location: Catterick Garrison
- Corps: Royal Corps of Transport

Insignia
- 2nd Division insignia

The 2nd Division Transport Regiment was a military support unit of the British Army, forming part of the Royal Corps of Transport. Initially formed in 1953, the regiment would serve the 2nd Infantry Division until its first disbandment in 1984 following a reorganisation of the British Army of the Rhine. Reformed one year later, it would finally be disbanded in 1993 following the End of the Cold War.

== Predecessor ==
In 1953, the 2nd Infantry Division Transport Column was formed in the Royal Army Service Corps, thereby combining the transport elements of the 2nd Armoured Division. The new column constituted of a headquarters and 11 & 113 Transport Companies. In 1958 the term 'Infantry' was dropped from the title. By 1958, the column was based at Wrexham Barracks, Mülheim. In 1962 the column was reorganised following the 1957 Defence White Paper to expand into 4, 8, and 54 Transport Companies, and then moved to Birdwood Barracks, Bunde. On 15 July 1965 as part of the before-mentioned white paper, the Royal Corps of Transport was formed, and the regiment transformed to the new corps as 2nd Division Transport Regiment.

== Service ==
Following the reorganisation of the column into a regiment in the RCT, the companies were reorganised into 4 and 33 transport squadrons, while 17 transport squadron later joined from the 6th Infantry Brigade. In the early 1970s the regiment was renamed as 2nd Division Transport Regiment. Between 1 March 1973 and 1984 the regiment would deploy to Northern Ireland on Operation Banner 9 x times, though only 3 x times (the last 3) would be as a full regiment. In 1978 the regiment was again renamed, this time becoming the 2nd Armoured Division Transport Regiment to reflect the changes brought upon by the 1975 Defence White Paper (Mason Review).

Under the 1981 Defence White Paper, the government "propose to reorganise the main regular structure of the Corps from the present four armoured division each of two brigades to three armoured divisions each of three brigades; the overheads of the fourth stationed division will thus be saved." In addition, "...as will a new reserve division formed primarily from the Territorial Army and committed to the reinforcement of I (BR) Corps." This announcement was later confirmed when the 2nd Armoured Division's HQ was disbanded in January 1983. The next year the transport regiment was disbanded.

Shortly after its disbandment, as part of the government's intention to form a full TA division, the 2nd Infantry Division was formed at Imphal Barracks, York; and the transport regiment joined shortly after as the 2nd Infantry Division Transport Regiment. The new regiment's organisation after reformation was as follows:

- Regimental Headquarters and Headquarters Squadron, at Catterick Garrison
- 15 Transport Squadron, at Catterick Garrison
  - A Troop – supporting 24th Airmobile Brigade, also based at Catterick
  - B Troop – supporting 49th (TA) Infantry Brigade headquartered in Chilwell
  - TA Troop – A new TA troop would be formed from 224 (Pembrokeshire Yeomanry) Transport Squadron (TA) on mobilisation to support 15th (TA) Infantry Brigade, headquartered in York
- 60 Transport Squadron, at Catterick Garrison
- Regimental Workshop, Royal Electrical and Mechanical Engineers, at Catterick Garrison

== Disbandment ==
In 1993, following the End of the Cold War and later Options for Change, a reorganisation of the Royal Corps of Transport (RCT), Royal Army Ordnance Corps (RAOC), Army Postal and Courier Service, Royal Engineers (RE), Royal Pioneer Corps (RPC), and Army Catering Corps (ACC) lead to the creation of the Royal Logistic Corps (RLC). However, 2nd Regiment RCT was among the unlucky to be disbanded, though the squadrons were retained, with 15 Transport Sqn moving to 24th Airmobile Support Battalion, while 60 Transport Sqn moved to 4th General Support Regiment, and the Regimental Workshop disbanded.
