= 100th (Yeomanry) Regiment Royal Artillery =

- Active: 1967 – 2014; 2023 – Present
- Allegiance: United Kingdom
- Branch: British Army
- Size: 368 officers and soldiers within three sub-units
- Part of: 3rd Deep Reconnaissance Strike Brigade
- Regimental Headquarters: Royal Artillery Barracks, Woolwich

100th (Yeomanry) Regiment Royal Artillery is a reserve unit of the British Army that provides tactical air control parties, naval gunnery liaison officers, specialist staff officers and gunnery instructors.

It was formerly part of the Territorial Army and had three gun batteries all equipped with the L118 Light Gun.

== History ==
=== First incarnation ===
The regiment was formed as 100th (Eastern) Medium Regiment Royal Artillery at Grove Park in London in 1967. Its sub-units were RHQ, HQ (Home Counties) Battery at Grove Park, Lewisham, (formed from Regimental HQ of 265th (8th London) Light Anti-Aircraft Regiment, Royal Artillery, together with HQ Royal Artillery of 44th (Home Counties) Division/District), 200 (Sussex Yeomanry) Medium Battery at Brighton, 201 (Hertfordshire and Bedfordshire Yeomanry) Medium Battery at Luton, 202 (Suffolk and Norfolk Yeomanry) Medium Battery at Bury St Edmunds and REME LAD which expanded into a workshop during the FH70 period. In 1970 it became 100th Regiment Royal Artillery and in 1976 it became 100 (Yeomanry) Field Regiment Royal Artillery.

In 1993 200 Battery left the regiment and 307 (South Nottinghamshire Hussars) Battery at Bulwell joined the unit. It was renamed 100 (Yeomanry) Regiment Royal Artillery in 1993 and in 1999, HQ and 202 Batteries left the regiment; 202 was replaced by 266 (Gloucestershire Volunteer Artillery) Battery at Bristol.

The regiment's original role was British Army of the Rhine (BAOR) emergency reinforcement, emphasised by its transfer into 49 Infantry Brigade under part of 2 Division. Under 'Options for Change', the regiment became a general support unit fitted out with the FH-70 155 mm towed howitzer and assigned to 3 Division.

Under Army 2020, this unit was placed in suspended animation and 266 (Gloucestershire Volunteer Artillery) Battery Royal Artillery joined 104th Regiment Royal Artillery.

==== Batteries ====
The batteries were as follows:

- 201 (Hertfordshire and Bedfordshire Yeomanry), based in Luton, placed in suspended animation under original Army 2020 reforms.
- 266 (Gloucestershire Volunteer Artillery), based in Bristol, used the 105mm Light Gun in support of 29th Commando Regiment Royal Artillery. Under Army 2020, this battery was subordinated to the 104th Regiment Royal Artillery, and re-roled to mini unmanned air systems.
- 307 (South Nottinghamshire Hussars) Battery, based in Bulwell, placed in suspended animation under original Army 2020 reforms.

==== Honorary colonels ====
- King Carl XVI Gustaf of Sweden until 2001 (Moved to 106 Regiment)
- Major General Freddie Viggers, 31 December 1997 to 17 February 2001
- Major General Andrew Ritchie, 17 February 2001 to disbandment

=== Second incarnation ===
==== Central Volunteer Headquarters, Royal Artillery ====
Prior to the review of the Territorial Army in 1967, all territorial troops who joined the Royal Artillery were organised through the Royal Artillery Depot based at Royal Artillery Barracks, Woolwich Garrison. However, as part of the reorganisation of the TA in 1967, all TA specialist units and formations were grouped under a single unit.

The new unit was formed as part of TAVR IIB, meaning it was able to deploy independent assets, but would be unable to deploy as a full unit (TAVR IIA would have this role).

After the 1966 Defence White Paper, the Central Volunteer Headquarters, Royal Artillery (CVHQ, RA) was formed at the before-mentioned barracks and placed under Headquarters, London District as a nationally recruited specialist TA unit.

After formation, the headquarters was organised as follows:

- Central Volunteer Headquarters, Royal Artillery
  - Regimental Headquarters, at Royal Artillery Barracks, Woolwich Station
  - Naval Gunfire Support Troop (formed from part of 881 Amphibious Observation Battery)
  - Royal Artillery Specialist Pool (V)
    - Heavy Air Defence Section (The Wessex Troop), (formed from part of 457th (Wessex) Heavy Air Defence Regiment (Hampshire Carabiniers Yeomanry))
    - Light Air Defence Section
    - Field Artillery Section
    - Liaison Officers Section
    - Meteorological Section
    - Location Section (two officers only, training under 94th Locating Regiment)

Following the Army 2020 reform, and later the Army 2020 Refine, the Central Volunteer Headquarters, Royal Artillery was retitled as the National Reserve Headquarters, Royal Artillery, and reorganised into the following structure:

- National Reserve Headquarters, Royal Artillery
  - Regimental Headquarters, at Royal Artillery Barracks, Woolwich Station
  - All Arms Staff Pool — made up of personnel from every cap badge, who train with formation headquarters in the Army, including HQ Allied Rapid Reaction Corps, both Divisions and most of the Army's Brigades.
  - 221 (Wessex) Battery, at Royal Artillery Barracks, Larkhill Garrison — The RA Specialist Battery provides gunnery instructors, Naval Gunfire Liaison Officers to 3 Commando Brigade and personnel to support Headquarters of 3rd Deep Reconnaissance Strike Brigade. The battery also helps train the rest of the Royal Artillery by providing instructors and support to courses.
  - 255 (Somerset Yeomanry) Tactical Air Control Party Battery, at Upper Bristol Road Army Reserve Centre, Bath— The Forward Air Control Battery controls combat aircraft in support of ground troops.

On 4 September 2023, the National Reserve Headquarters, Royal Artillery (NRHQ RA) had been redesignated the 100 (Yeomanry) Regiment, Royal Artillery, thereby reviving the old regiment.

== Current structure and role ==
The current structure is as follows:

=== 100th (Yeomanry) Regiment, Royal Artillery ===
- Regimental Headquarters, at Royal Artillery Barracks, Woolwich.
- All Arms Staff Pool, at Royal Artillery Barracks, Woolwich.
- 221 (Wessex) Battery Royal Artillery, at Larkhill Garrison.
- 255 (Somerset Yeomanry) Battery Royal Artillery, at Army Reserve Centre, Upper Bristol Rd, Bath.

221 Battery provides specialist gunnery staff support across the Field Army, but principally to Regular and Reserve Royal Artillery units and the Royal School of Artillery on operations and exercises.

255 Battery provides 10x Tactical Air Control Parties (TACPs), consisting of Joint Terminal Attack Controllers (JTACs) and TACP Signallers to support ground forces in the control of Close Air Support (CAS) aircraft; personnel deploy either as formed TACPs or as individual augmentees.

The All Arms Staff Pool (AASP) provides individual replacements to support staff officer functionality in Field Army formation Headquarters. The AASP also includes The Kings’ Troop Royal Horse Artillery support troop, Ground Liaison Officers and Naval Gunfire Liaison Officers (NGLO’s). NGLO’s deploy on Royal Navy and partner-nation warships to work with 29 Commando Regiment Royal Artillery and enable naval gunnery. Ground Liaison Officers support the Royal Air Force.

Only half of the regiment's 368 officers and soldiers are in the Royal Artillery, the rest representing almost every other cap badge in the British Army.
