= Parachute Regiment Group =

The Parachute Regiment Group was a British Army trials group formed in 1989.

Prior to 1989, there had been discussion within the British Army towards grouping the three TA battalions of the Parachute Regiment together, yet funding for a new operational brigade was not available. The Army therefore resulted in using the Parachute Regiment's Colonel and HQ (which didn't have a Transition to war (TTW), mobilization-and-war, role) to form an ad hoc unit for trials.

== Role ==
The main role of the Parachute Regiment Group was to deny the German town of Hildesheim to Soviet forces. The surrounding terrain made Hildesheim the only attractive option for an attack, and as a result was viewed as the most likely axis of attack by Soviet forces.

In addition, the surrounding area was also to serve as a protected area for 7th Armoured Brigade to refurbish following their counter attack on Soviet forces, a process expected to take 30 hours.

=== Order of battle ===
Upon Transition to War, the Parachute Regiment Group would have been divided as follows:

- Two Companies with 4x MILAN Firing Posts each. These acted as reserve demolition guards along the Leine river.
- A screening force made up of 3x recce platoons and 20x MILAN FPs. This was formed from all three battalions.
- The main force consisting of 11x Companies and 20x MILAN FPs, with 1x battalion acting as a quick reaction force.
- An ad hoc mortar company made from all three battalion's mortar platoons. In addition, 307 (South Nottinghamshire Hussars Yeomanry) Observation Post Battery, TA, would provide six forward observation parties.
- The A echelons from all three battalions formed to provide logistic support, whilst the B echelons formed in the 1st Armoured Division's rear area.

== Structure ==
Upon TTW, the Parachute Regiment Group was made up of the following units:

- 4th Battalion, Parachute Regiment
- 10th Battalion, Parachute Regiment
- 15th Battalion, Parachute Regiment

It was also expected, that 2nd Battalion, Royal Green Jackets would join the force once they had been relieved from their duties in the communication zone. It was also requested by the Parachute Regiment Group, that additional transport, supply, medical, engineering and military police units also be assigned.
