= 1st Reconnaissance Brigade =

Former British Army unit

Screening Force 1st Reconnaissance Brigade
- Active: 1997–2005/6; 8 years, 9 months
- Country: United Kingdom
- Branch: British Army
- Type: Reconnaissance Formation
- Role: Commanding the Formation Reconnaissance regiments attached to divisions
- Size: Brigade
- Part of: Headquarters Theatre Troops
- Brigade HQ: Netheravon

The 1st Reconnaissance Brigade was a short-lived specialist formation of the British Army which administered the formation reconnaissance regiments not attached to a division or brigade, and was disbanded sometime between 2005 and 2006.

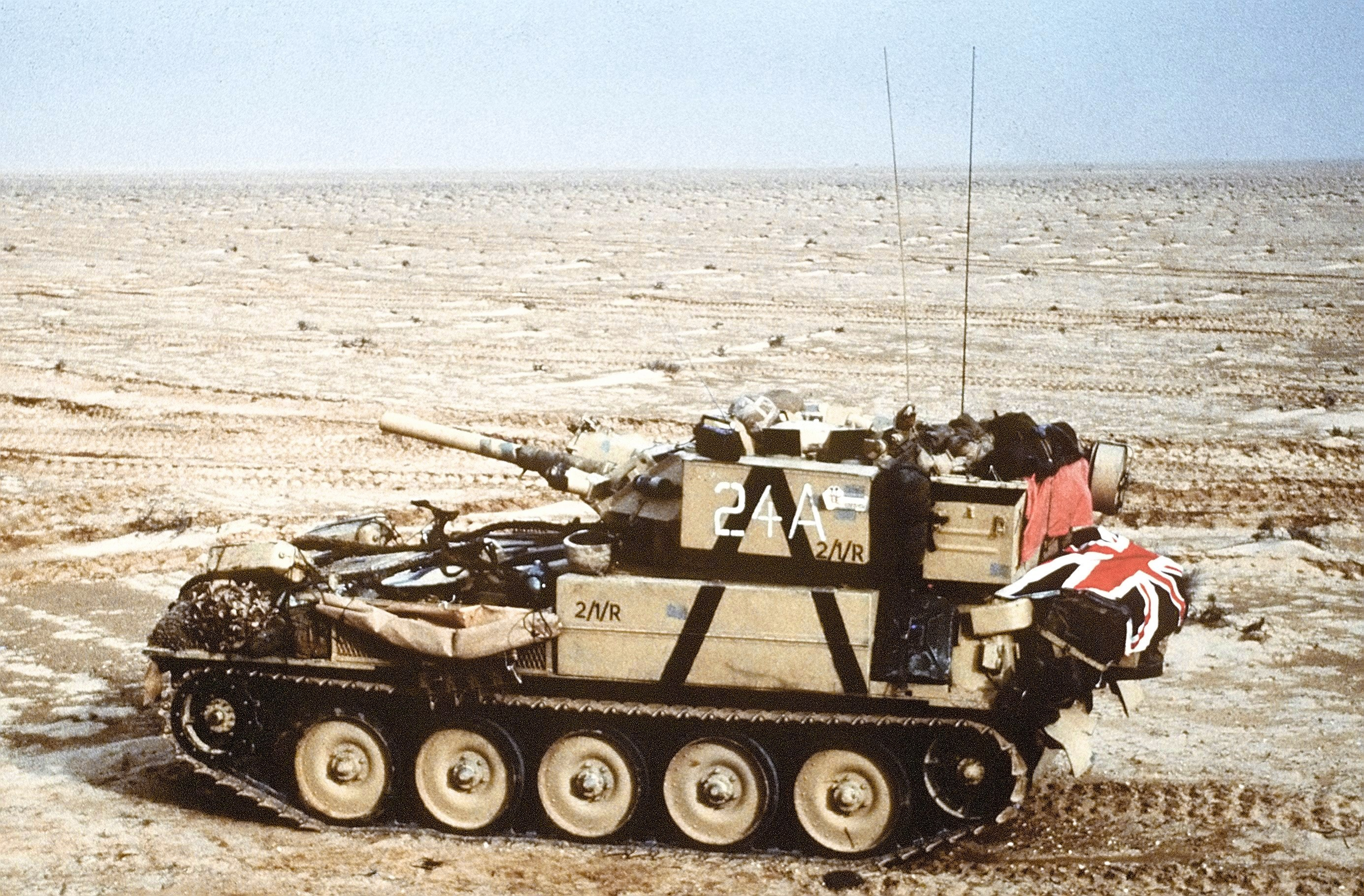
A Scorpion reconnaissance vehicle of the Royal Scots Dragoon Guards, 1st (United Kingdom) Armoured Division, advances east into Kuwait from southern Iraq during Operation Desert Storm.

== Screening Force ==
Sometime after the publishing of the 1981 Defence White Paper "The Way Forward", the Screening Force (Corps Border Surveillance Force) was formed as an ad hoc brigade within I (British) Corps. Brigadier Royal Armoured Corps, British Army of the Rhine would become 'Commander Screening Force' on mobilisation.

The force's objective, if mobilised, was to hold off a soviet frontal invasion for as long as possible until the 1st and 4th Armoured Divisions could be moved into position. If mobilised, the brigade would control al the units of the division in the reconnaissance role and providing a reconnaissance/screening force. On mobilisation, the force would have consisted:

- Brigadier, I (BR) Corps Royal Armoured Corps (Commander Screening Force)
  - Queen's Dragoon Guards, at Northampton Barracks, Wolfenbüttel (under command of 1st (UK) Armoured Division during peacetime)
  - 16th/5th The Queen's Royal Lancers, Harewood Barracks, Herford (under command of 4th Armoured Division during peacetime)
  - No. 664 Squadron, Army Air Corps, at Saint George's Barracks, Minden (under command of Commander Aviation BAOR during peacetime)

In 1992 following the disbandment of the British Army of the Rhine, the force HQ was disbanded.

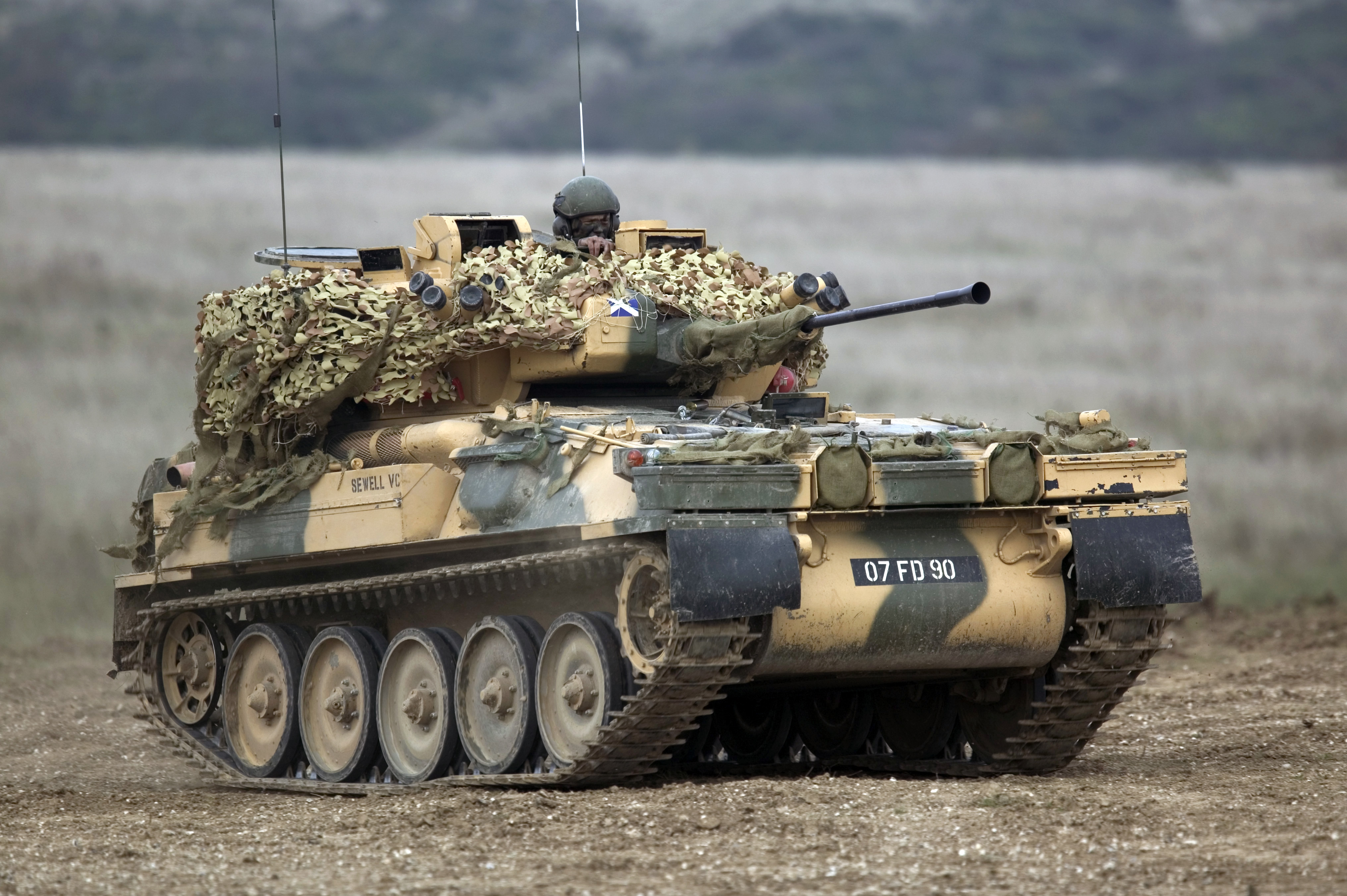
A Scimitar Light Tank from the Black Watch is pictured during a firepower demonstration on Salisbury Plain.

== Reconnaissance Brigade ==
The 1st Reconnaissance Brigade was established on 1 April 1997.

The brigade might have been assigned to HQ Allied Rapid Reaction Corps. Following the 2003 reorganisation of the Army under 'LANDmark', HQ Theatre Troops was formed to oversee the specialist brigades of the army. The brigade soon joined HQ Theatre Troops, which it would remain under until disbanding in 2005-06, following the Future Army Structure programme.
