= 49th Infantry Brigade (United Kingdom) =

49th Infantry Brigade 49th (Eastern) Infantry Brigade
- Active: August 1914–1919; 1953–1967; 1983–2015
- Country: United Kingdom
- Branch: British Army
- Type: Infantry
- Size: Brigade
- Part of: Eastern District
- Garrison/HQ: Chetwynd Barracks, Chilwell
- Engagements: Western Front

The 49th Infantry Brigade, later known as 49th (Eastern) Infantry Brigade during the Cold War, was a brigade of the British Army.

== First World War ==
The brigade started its existence as part of the 16th (Irish) Division, part of Kitchener's Army in the First World War. The 16th Division served through the war on the Western Front.

== Cold War ==
The 49th Brigade also served in Kenya during the Mau Mau Uprising from 1953 to 1955–6, incorporating the 1st Battalion, Royal Northumbrian Fusiliers, and the 1st Battalion, Royal Innskilling Fusiliers, joined by the 1st Battalion, Royal Irish Fusiliers, from January 1955.

However the core of the brigade's present history descends from the 49th (West Riding) Division, which fought in both World Wars. In the Second World War, the division was involved in the Norwegian Campaign, the guarding of Iceland, and Operation Overlord, where it landed in Normandy under XXX Corps. It was part of the reformed Territorial Army (as an armoured formation for a time) from 1947 to 1967.

The Brigade Headquarters was reformed as a regular HQ with TA units in 1982 as part of 2nd Infantry Division. It consisted of 5th and 7th Battalions, Royal Anglian Regiment, 5th Battalion, Royal Regiment of Fusiliers, 3rd Battalion, The Staffordshire Regiment, the Royal Yeomanry, equipped with Fox armoured cars, 100th (Yeomanry) Regiment Royal Artillery, with 105mm Light Guns, and 307 OP Battery RA (V). The Division was tasked with the wartime rear-area security of the I (BR) Corps sector, behind the forward armoured divisions, during any Soviet thrust into Western Europe.

== 1990s to disbandment ==
Following the end of the Cold War, the Brigade was reorganised as 49 (East Midlands) Brigade on 1 April 1992, and then as 49 (East) Brigade on 1 April 1995 following the merger with 54 (East Anglia) Brigade.

The brigade now has regional responsibility for Norfolk, Suffolk, Cambridgeshire, Northamptonshire, Leicester, Nottinghamshire, Lincolnshire, Derbyshire, Essex, Bedfordshire, Hertfordshire and Rutland. In April 2000 the Brigade came under command of the 4th Division based in Aldershot. As from 1 April 2007, the Brigade came under the command of the 5th Division based in Shrewsbury and as of 2012 the Brigade came under the command of Support Command.

Under Army 2020, 49 (East) Brigade was merged with 7th Armoured Brigade to become 7th Infantry Brigade and Headquarters East on 13 February 2015.

== Structure in 1989 ==
Below is the structure of the brigade in 1989, just before the end of the Cold War.

- Headquarters 49th (Eastern) Infantry Brigade
  - Headquarters 49th Infantry Brigade and Signal Troop, Royal Corps of Signals (V), Chilwell
    - 49th Infantry Brigade Defence and Employment Section, Royal Pioneer Corps (V)
  - The Royal Yeomanry (V), in Chelsea, London
  - 5th (Volunteer) Battalion, Royal Regiment of Fusiliers (V), in Coventry
    - Warwickshire Band of the Royal Regiment of Fusiliers
  - 5th (Volunteer) Battalion, Royal Anglian Regiment (V), in Peterborough
  - 7th (Volunteer) Battalion, Royal Anglian Regiment (V), in Leicester
  - 5th (Shropshire and Herefordshire) Battalion, The Light Infantry (V), in Shrewsbury
  - 3rd (Volunteer) Battalion, Staffordshire Regiment (Prince of Wales's) (V), in Wolverhampton
  - 100th (Yeomanry) Field Regiment, Royal Artillery (V) (Field Artillery), in Grove Park, London
