= No. 16 Flight AAC =

16 Flight
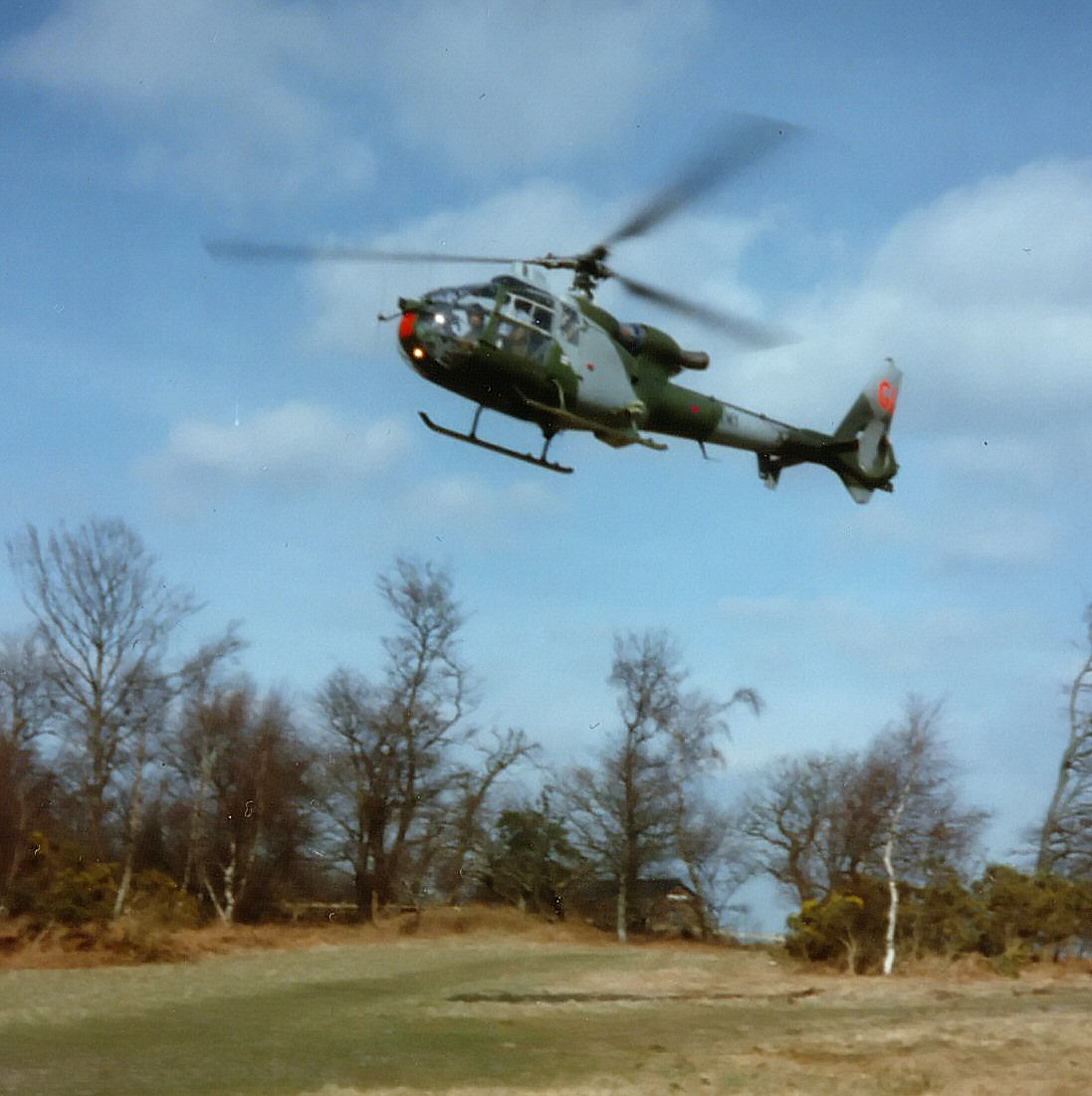
- A Westland Gazelle similar to those operated by 16 Flight
- Active: ? – ca. 2000
- Disbanded: ca. 2000
- Country: Britain
- Branch: Army Air Corps
- Role: Liaison
- Size: up to six helicopters
- Garrison/HQ: Dhekelia, Cyprus

Aircraft flown
- Utility helicopter: Westland Gazelle AH.1

16 Flight AAC was an independent flight within the British Army's Army Air Corps. It appears to have initially been formed in 1961, and operated in Aden and Borneo. Reformed circa 1982, it was based at Dhekelia in Cyprus, It operated in support of Army units based there. The unit operated Westland Gazelle AH.1 helicopters.

The unit was disbanded in 2000. Its role was taken by No. 84 Squadron RAF.

== See also ==
- List of Army Air Corps aircraft units
