= UNFICYP Flight AAC =

UNFICYP Flight AAC ~~United Nations Flight AAC~~ ~~Force Aviation Flight~~
- Active: 27 March 1964 – 30 September 1994
- Allegiance: United Kingdom
- Branch: British Army
- Type: Army aviation

Aircraft flown
- Patrol: Agusta Bell AH.1; Sud Aviation Alouette II; Westland Gazelle AH.1

The UNFICYP Flight AAC, originally known as the Force Aviation Flight, was a unit of the Army Air Corps (AAC) of the British Army attached to the United Nations Peacekeeping Force in Cyprus (UNFICYP). It was formed on 1 August 1966. The flight was originally equipped with Agusta Bell Sioux AH.1 helicopters. These were replaced in December 1977 by Sud Aviation Alouette II helicopters. The Alouettes were replaced by the Westland Gazelle AH.1 in October 1988.

Duties ended on 30 September 1994 when the AAC flight was replaced by a flight from the Argentine Air Force, ending thirty years, six months and four days of service under the UN flag.

== See also ==
- List of Army Air Corps aircraft units
