= Structure of the British Army =

Organisation of the British Army

The British Army is directed by the Chief of the General Staff (CGS), within Army Headquarters, which is located in Andover, Hampshire. Subordinate to the CGS, there is Land Forces Command, located at Trenchard Lines, Wiltshire and a personnel and UK operations command, Home Command, located at Aldershot Garrison, Hampshire.

== Introduction ==
The command structure within the British Army is hierarchical; with divisions and brigades controlling groupings of units from an administrative perspective. Major units are battalion-sized, with minor units being company sized sub-units. In some regiments or corps, battalions are called regiments, and companies are called squadrons or batteries, sub-divided into platoons or troops. All units within the British Army service are either Regular (full-time) or Army Reserve (full-time or part-time), or a combination with sub-units of each type.

Naming conventions of units differ for traditional British historical reasons, creating a significant opportunity for confusion; an infantry battalion is equivalent to a cavalry regiment. An infantry regiment is an administrative and ceremonial organisation only, and may include several battalions. For operational tasks, a battle group will be formed around a combat unit, supported by units or sub-units from other areas. An example would be a squadron of tanks attached to an armoured infantry battle group, together with a reconnaissance troop, artillery battery, and engineering support.

Since the 1957 Defence White Paper, which re-roled British forces in Germany in favour of nuclear weapons and the end of National Service, the size of the British Army has consistently shrunk. Since 1990, reductions have been almost constant, through succeeding defence reviews: Options for Change (1990), Front Line First (1994), the Strategic Defence Review (1998), Delivering Security in a Changing World (2003), the Army 2020 Restructuring (2010), the Army 2020 Refine (2015), and Defence in a Competitive Age (2021).

There were historically multiple types of military reserve forces. The oldest was the Militia Force (also referred to as the 'Constitutional Force'). While the Reserve Forces units mostly lost their own identities, and became numbered Territorial Force sub-units of regular British Army corps or regiments (the Home Militia had followed this path, with the Militia Infantry units becoming numbered battalions of British Army regiments, and the Militia Artillery integrating within Royal Artillery territorial divisions in 1882 and 1889, and becoming parts of the Royal Field Artillery or Royal Garrison Artillery in 1902 (though retaining their traditional corps names), but was not merged into the Territorial Force when it was created in 1908 (by the merger of the Yeomanry and Volunteer Force). The Militia was instead renamed the 'Special Reserve', and was permanently suspended after the First World War (although a handful of Militia units survived in the United Kingdom, its colonies, and the Crown Dependencies).

Unlike the Home, Imperial Fortress, and Crown Dependency Militia and Volunteer units and forces that continued to exist after the First World War, although parts of the British military, most were not considered parts of the British Army unless they received Army Funds (as was the case for the Bermuda Militia Artillery and the Bermuda Volunteer Rifle Corps), which was generally only the case for those in the Channel Islands or the Imperial Fortress colonies: Nova Scotia (before Canadian Confederation), Bermuda, Gibraltar, and Malta).

For all units, operational direction is via Permanent Joint Headquarters. Elements within the regionally-aligned brigades may also report to another chain of command. When not dealing with operational commitments or mission-specific training (e.g. when conducting routine civilian engagement, ranges, or 'defence contribution to homeland resilience' (homeland defence)) they may report through a Regional Point of Command (RPOC) to Headquarters Regional Command at Andover. Therefore, it may not always be apparent as to which Headquarters a given unit is working to, and care should be taken to establish the correct chain of command for any engagement.

== Army Headquarters ==
Through a major army reorganisation, effective 1 November 2011, the Chief of the General Staff took direct command of the Army through a new structure, based at Andover and known as 'Army Headquarters'.

Reporting to the Chief of the General Staff are four lieutenant-generals: the Deputy Chief of the General Staff (DCGS), the Commander Home Command (CHC), the Commander Allied Rapid Reaction Corps and the Commander Field Army (CFA). The CFA is responsible for generating and preparing forces for current and contingency operations; they command 1st (United Kingdom) Division, 3rd (United Kingdom) Division, and Joint Aviation Command (JAC).

== Graphic overview ==
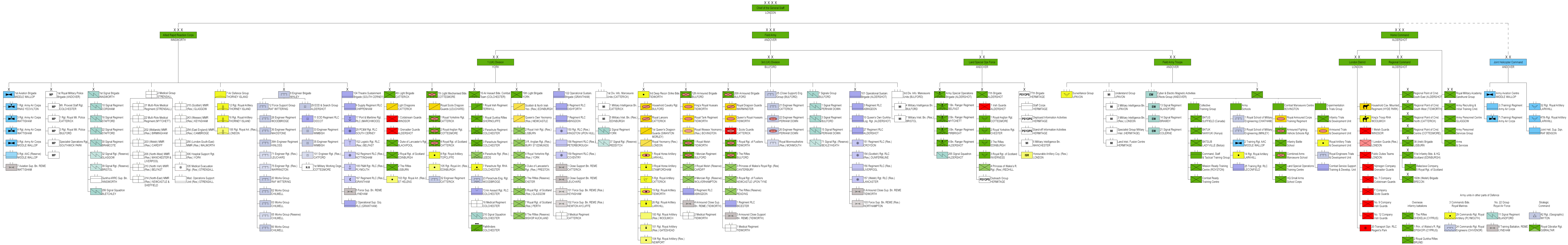
Organization of the British Army as of June 2026 (click to enlarge)

== Allied Rapid Reaction Corps ==
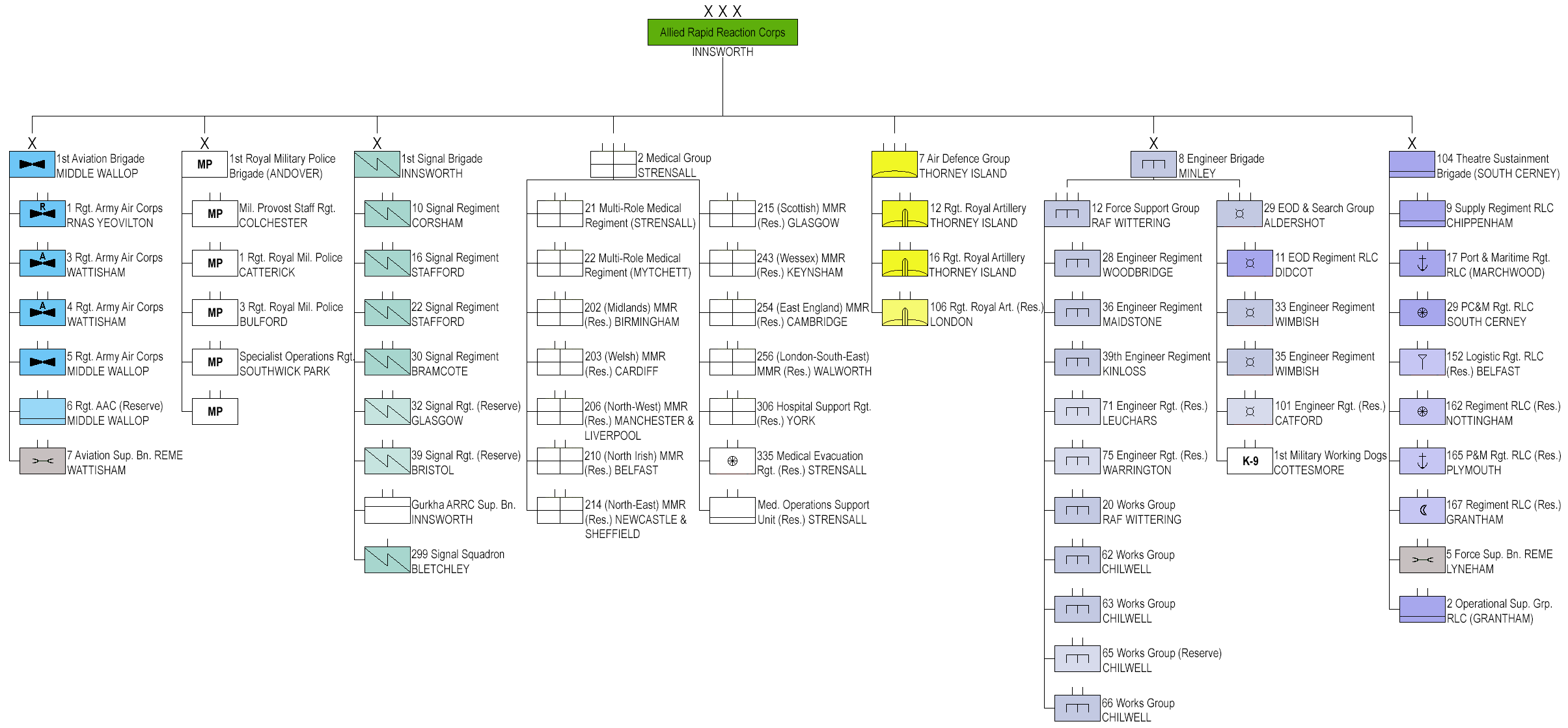
Allied Rapid Reaction Corps organization as of January 2026 (click to enlarge)

Headquarters, Allied Rapid Reaction Corps, at Imjin Barracks, Innsworth

=== 1st Aviation Brigade ===
- 1st Aviation Brigade, at Middle Wallop Flying Station
  - 1 Regiment Army Air Corps, at RNAS Yeovilton, (AH1 Wildcat)
  - 3 Regiment Army Air Corps, at Wattisham Flying Station, (AH64E Apache)
  - 4 Regiment Army Air Corps, at Wattisham Flying Station, (AH64E Apache)
  - 5 Regiment Army Air Corps, at Middle Wallop Flying Station
  - 6 Regiment Army Air Corps, at Middle Wallop Flying Station
  - 7 Aviation Support Battalion REME, at Wattisham Flying Station

=== 1st Military Police Brigade ===
- 1st Military Police Brigade at Marlborough Lines, Andover
  - 1st Regiment, Royal Military Police, at Gaza Barracks, Catterick Garrison
  - 3rd Regiment, Royal Military Police, at Wing Barracks, Bulford Camp
  - Military Provost Staff Regiment, at Military Corrective Training Centre, Colchester Garrison
  - Specialist Operations Regiment, Royal Military Police, at Southwick Park

=== 1st Signal Brigade ===
- 1st Signal Brigade, at Imjin Barracks, Innsworth
  - 299 Signal Squadron (Special Communications), supports Other Government Departments in the UK and overseas, Bletchley
  - 10 Signal Regiment, Royal Corps of Signals, at MOD Corsham, Corsham
  - 16 Signal Regiment, Royal Corps of Signals, at Beacon Barracks, Stafford
  - 22 Signal Regiment, Royal Corps of Signals, at Beacon Barracks, Stafford
  - 30 Signal Regiment, Royal Corps of Signals, at Gamecock Barracks, Bramcote (to move to Beacon Barracks, Stafford)
  - 32 (Scottish) Signal Regiment, Royal Corps of Signals, in Glasgow (Army Reserve)
  - 39 (Skinners) Signal Regiment, Royal Corps of Signals, in Bristol (Army Reserve)
  - Gurkha ARRC Support Battalion, at Imjin Barracks, Innsworth

=== 2nd Medical Group ===
- 2nd Medical Group, at Queen Elizabeth Barracks, Strensall
  - Medical Operations Support Unit, Royal Army Medical Service, at Queen Elizabeth Barracks, Strensall (Army Reserve)
  - Central Reserve Headquarters, Army Medical Services, at Queen Elizabeth Barracks, Strensall
  - 21 Multi-Role Medical Regiment, Royal Army Medical Service, at Queen Elizabeth Barracks, Strensall
  - 22 Multi-Role Medical Regiment, Royal Army Medical Service, at Keogh Barracks, Mytchett
  - 202 (Midlands) Multi-Role Medical Regiment, Royal Army Medical Service, in Birmingham (Army Reserve)
  - 203 (Welsh) Multi-Role Medical Regiment, Royal Army Medical Service, in Cardiff (Army Reserve)
  - 206 (North West) Multi-Role Medical Regiment, Royal Army Medical Service, in Manchester/Liverpool (Army Reserve)
  - 210 (North Irish) Multi-Role Medical Regiment, Royal Army Medical Service, in Belfast (Army Reserve)
  - 214 (North East) Multi-Role Medical Regiment, Royal Army Medical Service, in Newcastle/Sheffield (Army Reserve)
  - 215 (Scottish) Multi-Role Medical Regiment, Royal Army Medical Service, in Glasgow (Army Reserve)
  - 243 (Wessex) Multi-Role Medical Regiment, Royal Army Medical Service, in Keynsham (Army Reserve)
  - 254 (East of England) Multi-Role Medical Regiment, Royal Army Medical Service, in Cambridge (Army Reserve)
  - 256 (London and South East) Multi-Role Medical Regiment, Royal Army Medical Service, in Walworth (Army Reserve)
  - 306 Hospital Support Regiment, Royal Army Medical Service, in York (Army Reserve)
  - 335 Medical Evacuation Regiment, Royal Army Medical Service, at Queen Elizabeth Barracks, Strensall (Army Reserve)

=== 7th Air Defence Group ===
- 7 Air Defence Group, at Baker Barracks, Thorney Island, Thorney Island
  - 12th Regiment Royal Artillery, at Baker Barracks, Thorney Island (Equipped with Starstreak LML and Stormer HVM)
  - 16th Regiment Royal Artillery, at Baker Barracks, Thorney Island (Equipped with Sky Sabre)
  - 106th (Yeomanry) Regiment Royal Artillery, in London (Army Reserve, Equipped with Starstreak LML)

=== 8 Engineer Brigade ===
- 8 Engineer Brigade, at Gibraltar Barracks, Minley
  - Central Volunteer Headquarters, Royal Engineers, at Gibraltar Barracks, Minley
  - 12 (Force Support) Engineer Group at RAF Wittering
    - 28 Engineer Regiment, Royal Engineers, at Rock Barracks, Woodbridge and RAF Honington – CBRN Defence
    - 36 Engineer Regiment, Royal Engineers, at Invicta Park Barracks, Maidstone
    - 39 Engineer Regiment, Royal Engineers, at Kinloss Barracks, Kinloss – Air Support
    - 71 Engineer Regiment, Royal Engineers, at Leuchars Station, Fife (Army Reserve - paired with 39 Engineer Regiment)
    - 75 Engineer Regiment, Royal Engineers, at Peninsula Barracks, Warrington (Army Reserve - paired with 36 Engineer Regiment)
    - 43 Headquarters and Support Squadron
      - 20 Works Group Royal Engineers (Air Support) at RAF Wittering (STREs based at other RAF bases)
      - 62 Works Group Royal Engineers at Chetwynd Barracks, Chilwell (moving to Beacon Barracks, Stafford)
      - 63 Works Group Royal Engineers at Chetwynd Barracks, Chilwell (moving to Beacon Barracks)
      - 65 Works Group Royal Engineers at Chetwynd Barracks, Chilwell (Army Reserve) (moving to Beacon Barracks)
      - 66 Works Group Royal Engineers at Chetwynd Barracks, Chilwell (moving to Beacon Barracks)
  - 29 (Explosive Ordnance Disposal and Search) Group at Montgomery House, Aldershot Garrison
    - 11 Explosive Ordnance Disposal and Search Regiment, Royal Logistic Corps at Vauxhall Barracks, Didcot
    - 33 Engineer Regiment (EOD&S), Royal Engineers at Carver Barracks, Wimbish
    - 35 Engineer Regiment (EOD&S), Royal Engineers at Carver Barracks, Wimbish - EOD Regiment
    - 101 (City of London) Engineer Regiment (EOD&S), Royal Engineers in Catford (Army Reserve)
    - 1st Military Working Dog Regiment, Royal Army Veterinary Corps at St George's Barracks, North Luffenham

=== 9th Deep Recce Strike Brigade ===
- 9th Deep Recce Strike Brigade, at Imjin Barracks, Innsworth

=== 104 Theatre Sustainment Brigade ===
- 104 Theatre Sustainment Brigade, at Duke of Gloucester Barracks, South Cerney
  - 2 Operational Support Group, Royal Logistic Corps, at Prince William of Gloucester Barracks, Grantham (Specialist Support Group)
  - 9 Regiment, Royal Logistic Corps, at Buckley Barracks, Chippenham (Theatre Logistic Regiment)
  - 17 Port and Maritime Regiment, Royal Logistic Corps, at Marchwood Military Port, Marchwood (Port and Maritime Support Regiment)
  - 29 Postal Courier and Movement Regiment, Royal Logistic Corps, at Duke of Gloucester Barracks, South Cerney (Postal Courier and Movement Control Regiment)
  - 152 (North Irish) Regiment, Royal Logistic Corps, at Palace Barracks, Holywood (Fuel Storage and Transport Regiment) (Army Reserve)
  - 162 Postal Courier and Movement Regiment, Royal Logistic Corps, at Nottingham (Movement Control Regiment) (Army Reserve – paired with 29 Regiment, RLC)
  - 165 (Wessex) Port and Enabling Regiment, Royal Logistic Corps, at Plymouth (Port and Maritime Support Regiment) (Army Reserve – paired with 17 Regiment, RLC)
  - 167 Catering Support Regiment, Royal Logistic Corps, at Prince William of Gloucester Barracks, Grantham (Catering Support) (Army Reserve)
  - 5 Force Support Battalion, Royal Electrical and Mechanical Engineers, at MOD Lyneham (Force Maintenance Support Battalion)

== Field Army ==
Field Army gained initial operating capability (IOC) on 30 November 2015, and was formed as a result of the 2015 Army Command Review. The Commander Field Army commands all the formations of the British Army's forces for operational tasks, its collective training, and tactical doctrine organisations, and includes the vast majority of the Army's fighting equipment.

The units under Field Army are:

=== 1st (UK) Division ===
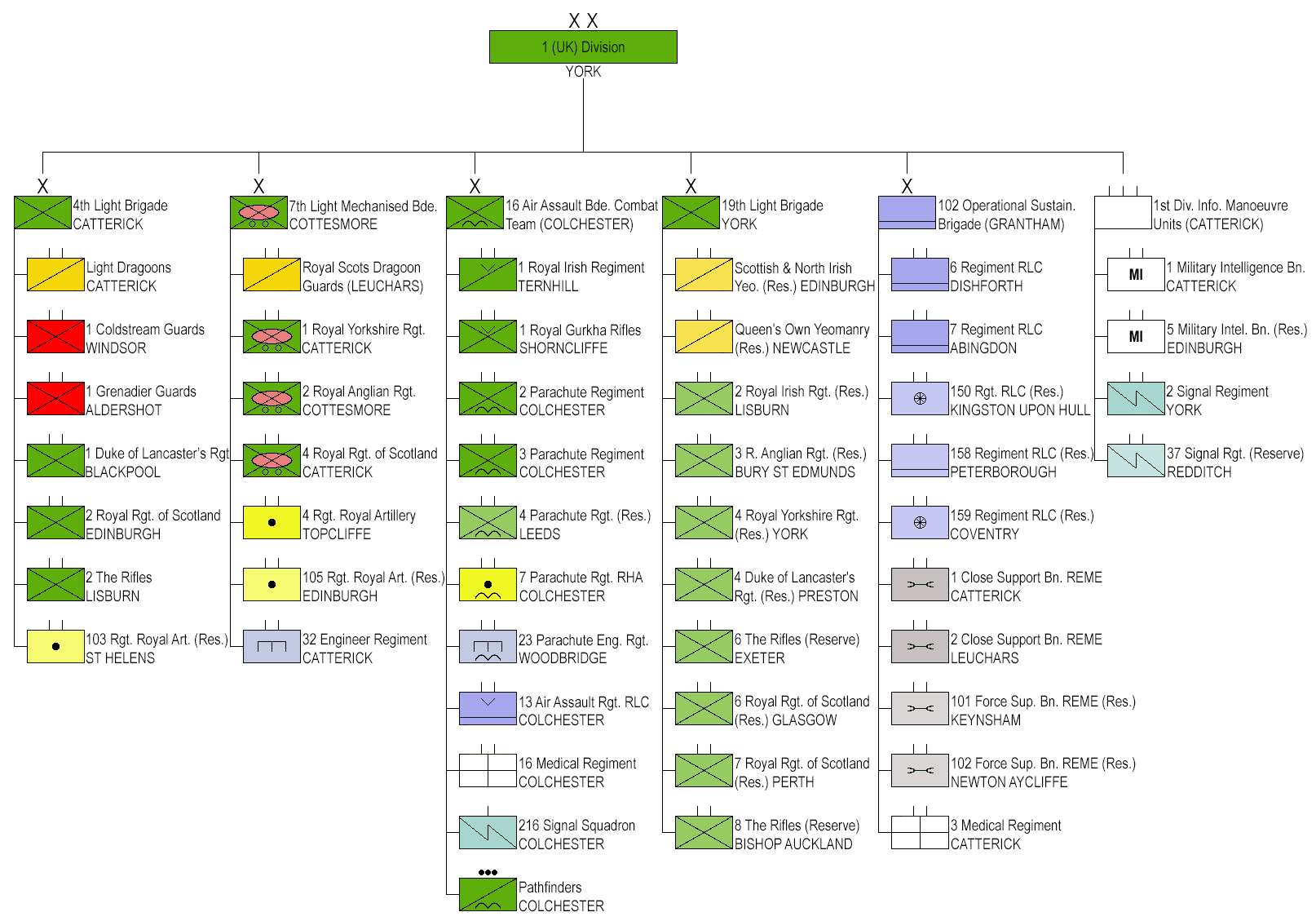
1st (UK) Division organization as of January 2026 (click to enlarge)

- 1st (UK) Division, in York

==== 1st (UK) Division Information Manoeuvre Units ====
- 1st (UK) Division Information Manoeuvre Units, in York
  - 1 Military Intelligence Battalion, Intelligence Corps, at Bourlon Barracks, Catterick Garrison
  - 5 Military Intelligence Battalion, Intelligence Corps, in Edinburgh (Army Reserve)
  - 2 Signal Regiment, Royal Corps of Signals, at Imphal Barracks, York (provides support to the 1st (UK) Division)
  - 37 Signal Regiment, Royal Corps of Signals, in Redditch (Army Reserve)

==== 1st Deep Recce Strike Brigade ====
- 1st Deep Recce Strike Brigade, in York

==== 4th Light Brigade ====
- 4th Light Brigade, at Bourlon Barracks, Catterick Garrison
  - Light Dragoons, at Gaza Barracks, Catterick Garrison (Light Cavalry) (Note: Light Cavalry is equipped with Jackal 2)
  - 1st Battalion, Grenadier Guards, at Lille Barracks, Aldershot Garrison (Light Infantry)
  - 1st Battalion, Coldstream Guards at Victoria Barracks, Windsor (Light Infantry)
  - 1st Battalion, Duke of Lancaster's Regiment (King's, Lancashire and Border), at Weeton Barracks (Light Infantry)
  - Royal Highland Fusiliers, 2nd Battalion, Royal Regiment of Scotland, at Glencorse Barracks, Penicuik (Light Infantry)
  - 2nd Battalion, The Rifles, at Thiepval Barracks, Lisburn (Light Infantry)
  - 103rd (Lancashire Artillery Volunteers) Regiment Royal Artillery, in St Helens (Light Fires) (Note: Light Fires Regiments are equipped with 24x L118 (105mm) Light Guns)

==== 7th Light Mechanised Brigade ====
- 7th Light Mechanised Brigade, at Kendrew Barracks, Cottesmore
  - Royal Scots Dragoon Guards (Carabiniers and Greys), at Waterloo Lines, Leuchars Station (Light Cavalry)
  - 1st Battalion, Scots Guards, at Bourlon Barracks, Catterick Garrison (Light Mechanised Infantry)
  - 1st Battalion, Royal Yorkshire Regiment (14th/15th, 19th and 33rd/76th Foot), at Somme Barracks, Catterick Garrison (Light Mechanised Infantry)
  - 1st Battalion, The Rifles, at Bourlon Barracks, Catterick Garrison (Light Mechanised Infantry)
  - 1st Battalion Princess of Wales's Royal Regiment (Queen's and Royal Hampshires), at Royal Artillery Barracks, Woolwich
  - 2nd Battalion, Royal Anglian Regiment, at Kendrew Barracks, Cottesmore (Light Mechanised Infantry) (Note: Light Mechanised Infantry is either equipped with Foxhound or Mastiff)
  - 4th Regiment Royal Artillery, at Alanbrooke Barracks, Topcliffe (Light Fires)
  - 105th Regiment Royal Artillery, in Edinburgh (Army Reserve Light Fires)
  - 32 Engineer Regiment, Royal Engineers, at Catterick Garrison (Close Support Engineers)

==== 16 Air Assault Brigade ====
- 16 Air Assault Brigade, at Merville Barracks, Colchester Garrison
  - 216 Parachute Signal Squadron at Merville Barracks, Colchester Garrison
  - 226 Signal Squadron at Cawdor Barracks, Pembrokeshire (under 14 Signal Regiment for admin)
  - Pathfinder Platoon
  - 1st Battalion, Royal Irish Regiment (27th (Inniskilling), 83rd, 87th and Ulster Defence Regiment), at Clive Barracks, Ternhill
  - 1st Battalion, Royal Gurkha Rifles, at Sir John Moore Barracks, Shorncliffe
  - 2nd Battalion, Parachute Regiment, at Merville Barracks, Colchester Garrison
  - 3rd Battalion, Parachute Regiment, at Merville Barracks, Colchester Garrison
  - 4th Battalion, Parachute Regiment, in Leeds (Army Reserve)
  - 7th Parachute Regiment Royal Horse Artillery, (Light Artillery) at Merville Barracks, Colchester Garrison
  - 23 Parachute Engineer Regiment, Royal Engineers at Rock Barracks, Woodbridge
  - 13 Air Assault Support Regiment, Royal Logistic Corps at Merville Barracks, Colchester Garrison
  - 16 Medical Regiment, Royal Army Medical Service at Merville Barracks, Colchester Garrison
  - 156 Provost Company, Royal Military Police at Reed Hall Lines, Colchester Garrison (under 3 Regiment RMP for Admin)

16 Air Assault Brigade reinforcement batteries:

- A Battery, Honourable Artillery Company (Light Artillery) — under Honourable Artillery Company
- 12 (Minden) Battery, Royal Artillery (LAD) — under 12th Regiment Royal Artillery
- 21 (Gibraltar 1779–83) Battery, Royal Artillery (UAS) — under 32nd Regiment Royal Artillery
- 53 (Louisburg) Battery, Royal Artillery (STA) — under 5th Regiment Royal Artillery

==== 19th Light Brigade ====
- 19th Light Brigade, at Imphal Barracks, York
  - Queen's Own Yeomanry, at Fenham Barracks, Newcastle upon Tyne (Army Reserve Light Cavalry) — paired with the Light Dragoons
  - Scottish and North Irish Yeomanry, at Redford Barracks, Edinburgh (Army Reserve Light Cavalry) – paired with Royal Scots Dragoon Guards
  - 2nd Battalion, Royal Irish Regiment (27th (Inniskilling), 83rd, 87th and Ulster Defence Regiment), at Thiepval Barracks, Lisburn (Army Reserve Light Infantry)
  - 3rd Battalion, Royal Anglian Regiment, in Bury St Edmunds (Army Reserve Light Infantry) — paired with 2 R ANGLIAN
  - 4th Battalion, Royal Yorkshire Regiment, at Worsley Barracks, York (Army Reserve Light Infantry)
  - 52nd Lowland Volunteers, 6th Battalion, Royal Regiment of Scotland, at Walcheren Barracks, Glasgow (Army Reserve Light Infantry) — paired with 2 SCOTS
  - 4th Battalion, Duke of Lancaster's Regiment (King's, Lancashire and Border), at Kimberley Barracks, Preston (Army Reserve Light Infantry) — paired with 1 LANCS
  - 51st Highland Volunteers, 7th Battalion, Royal Regiment of Scotland at Queen's Barracks, Perth (Army Reserve Light Infantry) – paired with 3 SCOTS
  - 6th Battalion, The Rifles, at Wyvern Barracks, Exeter (Army Reserve Light Infantry) — paired with 1 RIFLES
  - 8th Battalion, The Rifles in Bishop Auckland (Army Reserve Light Infantry) – paired with 3 RIFLES

==== 102 Operational Sustainment Brigade ====
- 102 Operational Sustainment Brigade, at Prince William of Gloucester Barracks, Grantham
  - 3 Medical Regiment, Royal Army Medical Service, at Catterick Garrison
  - 6 Regiment, Royal Logistic Corps, at Dishforth Airfield, North Yorkshire
  - 7 Regiment, Royal Logistic Corps, at Kendrew Barracks, Cottesmore
  - 150 Regiment, Royal Logistic Corps at Londesborough Barracks, Kingston upon Hull (Army Reserve)
  - 158 Regiment, Royal Logistic Corps in Peterborough (Army Reserve – paired with 7 Regiment RLC)
  - 159 Regiment, Royal Logistic Corps in Coventry (Army Reserve – paired with 6 Regiment RLC)
  - 1 Close Support Battalion, Royal Electrical and Mechanical Engineers, at Munster Barracks, Catterick Garrison
  - 2 Close Support Battalion, Royal Electrical and Mechanical Engineers, at Leuchars Station, Fife
  - 101 Force Support Battalion, Royal Electrical and Mechanical Engineers, in Keynsham (Army Reserve)
  - 102 Force Support Battalion, Royal Electrical and Mechanical Engineers, in Newton Aycliffe (Army Reserve)

=== 3rd (UK) Division ===
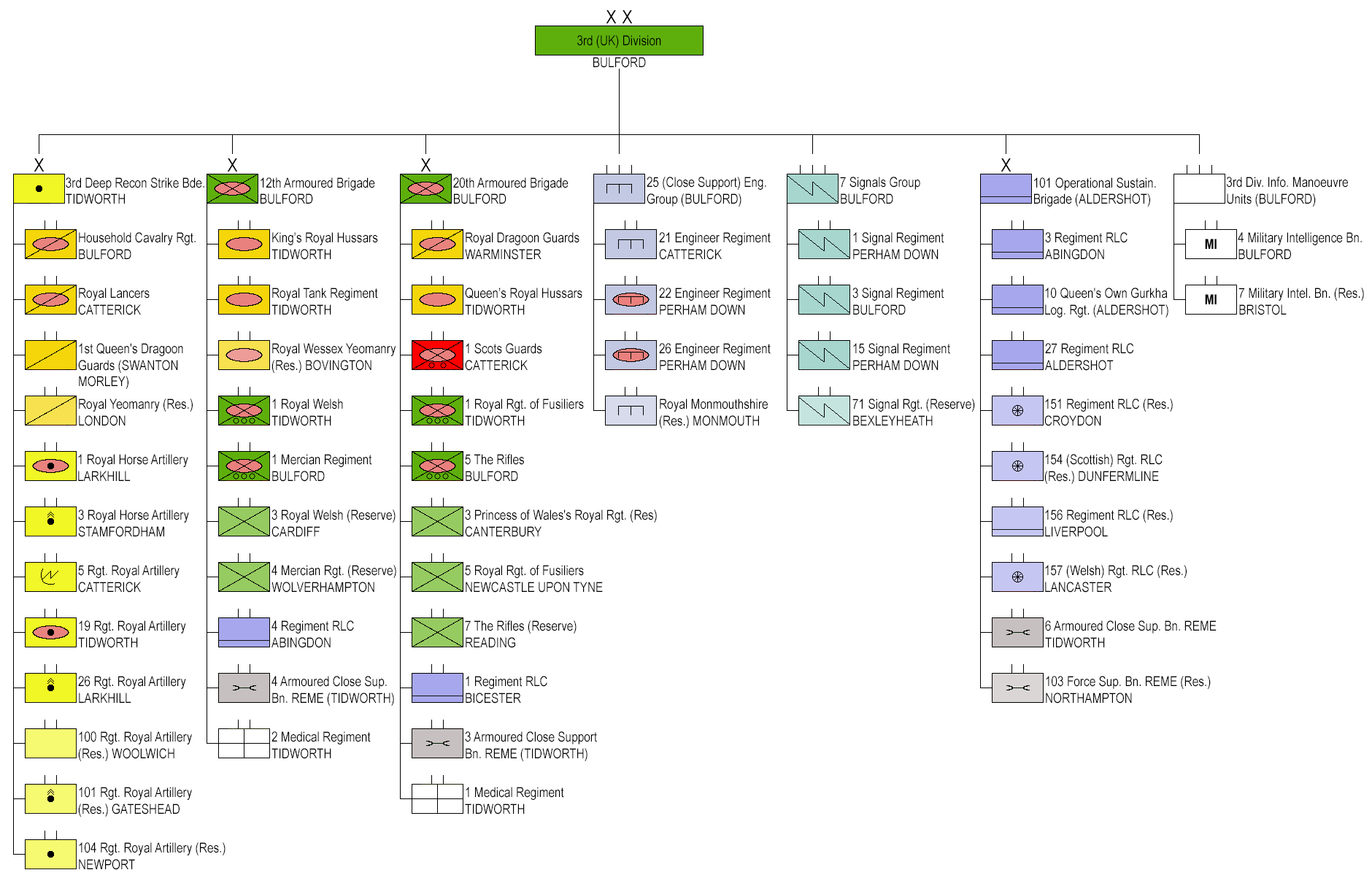
3rd (UK) Division organization as of January 2026 (click to enlarge)

- 3rd (UK) Division, at Picton Barracks, Bulford Camp

==== 3rd (UK) Division Information Manoeuvre Units ====
- 3rd (UK) Division Information Manoeuvre Units, at Bulford Camp
  - 4 Military Intelligence Battalion, Intelligence Corps, at Kiwi Barracks, Bulford Camp
  - 7 Military Intelligence Battalion, Intelligence Corps, in Bristol (Army Reserve)

==== 3rd Deep Recce Strike Brigade ====
- 3rd Deep Recce Strike Brigade, at Tidworth Garrison
  - Household Cavalry Regiment, at Bulford Camp (Armoured Cavalry)
  - Royal Lancers (Queen Elizabeth's Own), at Catterick Garrison (Armoured Cavalry)
  - 1st The Queen's Dragoon Guards, at Robertson Barracks, Swanton Morley (Light Cavalry)
  - Royal Yeomanry, at Fulham House, London (Army Reserve Light Cavalry) — paired with QDG
  - 1st Regiment Royal Horse Artillery, at Assaye Barracks, Larkhill Garrison (Armoured Fires) (Note: Armoured Fires Regiments are equipped with 24x AS-90 155mm Guns)
  - 3rd Regiment Royal Horse Artillery, at Albemarle Barracks, Stamfordham (Deep Fires)
  - 5th Regiment Royal Artillery, at Marne Barracks, Catterick Garrison (Surveillance and Target Acquisition Regiment)
  - 19 Regiment Royal Artillery, at Bhurtpore Barracks, Tidworth Garrison (Armoured Fires)
  - 26 Regiment Royal Artillery, at Purvis Lines, Larkhill Garrison (Deep Fires) (Note: Deep Fires regiments are equipped with M270 MLRS)
  - 100 (Yeomanry) Regiment Royal Artillery, at Royal Artillery Barracks, Woolwich (Army Reserve)
  - 101 (Northumbrian) Regiment Royal Artillery, in Gateshead (Army Reserve Deep Fires)
  - 104 Regiment Royal Artillery, at Raglan Barracks, Newport (Army Reserve Light Fires)

==== 12th Armoured Brigade ====
- 12th Armoured Brigade, at Bulford Camp
  - King's Royal Hussars, at Tidworth Garrison (Armoured Regiment)
  - Royal Tank Regiment, at Tidworth Garrison (Armoured Regiment) (Note: Equipped with Challenger 3)
  - Royal Wessex Yeomanry, in Bovington (Army Reserve – Challenger 2)
  - 1st Battalion, Mercian Regiment (Cheshires, Worcesters & Foresters, and Staffords), at Bulford Camp (Armoured Infantry) (Note: Armoured Infantry Battalions are equipped with Warrior AFVs, by 2025 all Armoured Infantry Battalions will become Mechanised Infantry equipped with Boxer MIV)
  - 1st Battalion, Royal Welsh, at Tidworth Garrison (Armoured Infantry)
  - 4th Battalion, Mercian Regiment (Cheshires, Worcesters & Foresters, and Staffords), in Wolverhampton (Army Reserve Light Infantry)
  - 3rd Battalion, Royal Welsh, in Cardiff (Army Reserve Light Infantry)
  - 4 Regiment, Royal Logistic Corps, at Dalton Barracks, Abingdon-on-Thames
  - 2 Medical Regiment, Royal Army Medical Service, at Normandy Barracks, Aldershot Garrison
  - 4 Armoured Close Support Battalion, Royal Electrical and Mechanical Engineers, at Jellalabad Barracks, Tidworth Garrison

==== 20th Armoured Brigade ====
- 20th Armoured Brigade, at Bulford Camp
  - Royal Dragoon Guards, at Battlesbury Barracks, Warminster, (Armoured Cavalry)
  - Queen's Royal Hussars (Queen's Own and Royal Irish), at Tidworth Garrison (Armoured Regiment)
  - 1st Battalion, Royal Regiment of Fusiliers, at Tidworth Garrison (Armoured Infantry)
  - 5th Battalion, The Rifles, at Bulford Camp, (Armoured Infantry)
  - 5th Battalion, Royal Regiment of Fusiliers, in Newcastle upon Tyne (Army Reserve Armoured Infantry)
  - 7th Battalion, The Rifles, in Reading (Army Reserve Light Infantry)
  - 3rd Battalion, Princess of Wales's Royal Regiment, in Canterbury (Army Reserve Light Infantry)
  - 1 Regiment, Royal Logistic Corps, at St David's Barracks, Bicester
  - 1 Medical Regiment, Royal Army Medical Service, at Bhurtpore Barracks, Tidworth
  - 3 Armoured Close Support Battalion, Royal Electrical and Mechanical Engineers, at Prince Philip Lines, Tidworth Garrison

==== 25 (Close Support) Engineer Group ====
- 25 (Close Support) Engineer Group, at Picton Barracks, Bulford Camp
  - 22 Engineer Regiment, Royal Engineers, in Swinton Barracks, Perham Down (Armoured Close Support Regiment, in support of 20th Armoured BCT)
  - 26 Engineer Regiment, Royal Engineers, in Swinton Barracks, Perham Down (Armoured Close Support Regiment, in support of 12th Armoured BCT)
  - 21 Engineer Regiment, Royal Engineers, in Claro Barracks, Ripon, to move to Marne Barracks, Catterick Garrison by 2025
  - Royal Monmouthshire Royal Engineers (Militia), in Monmouth

==== 7 Signal Group ====
- 7 Signal Group, at Venning Barracks, Donnington (to move to Kiwi Barracks, Bulford Camp)
  - 1 Signal Regiment, Royal Corps of Signals, at Swinton Barracks, Perham Down
  - 3rd (UK) Division Signal Regiment, Royal Corps of Signals, at Kiwi Barracks, Bulford Garrison
  - 15 Signal Regiment, Royal Corps of Signals, at Swinton Barracks, Perham Down
  - 71 (City of London) Yeomanry Signal Regiment, Royal Corps of Signals, in Bexleyheath (Army Reserve – paired with 3 Signal Regiment)

==== 101 Operational Sustainment Brigade ====
- 101 Operational Sustainment Brigade, at St Omer Barracks, Aldershot Garrison
  - 3 Regiment, Royal Logistic Corps, at Dalton Barracks, Abingdon-on-Thames
  - 6 Armoured Close Support Battalion, Royal Electrical and Mechanical Engineers, at Delhi Barracks, Tidworth Garrison
  - 10 Queen's Own Gurkha Logistic Regiment, Royal Logistic Corps, at Gale Barracks, Aldershot Garrison
  - 27 Regiment, Royal Logistic Corps, at Travers Barracks, Aldershot Garrison
  - 151 (Greater London) Regiment, Royal Logistic Corps, in Croydon (Army Reserve – paired with 10 QOGLR)
  - 154 (Scottish) Regiment, Royal Logistic Corps, in Dunfermline (Army Reserve – Paired with 27 Regiment RLC)
  - 156 (North West) Regiment, Royal Logistic Corps, in Liverpool (Army Reserve – paired with 27 Regiment RLC, provides reserve augmentation to the brigade's regular RLC units)
  - 157 (Welsh) Regiment, Royal Logistic Corps, in Lancaster (Army Reserve – paired with 9 Theatre Logistic Regiment)
  - 103 Force Support Battalion, Royal Electrical and Mechanical Engineers, in Northampton (Army Reserve)

=== Field Army Troops ===
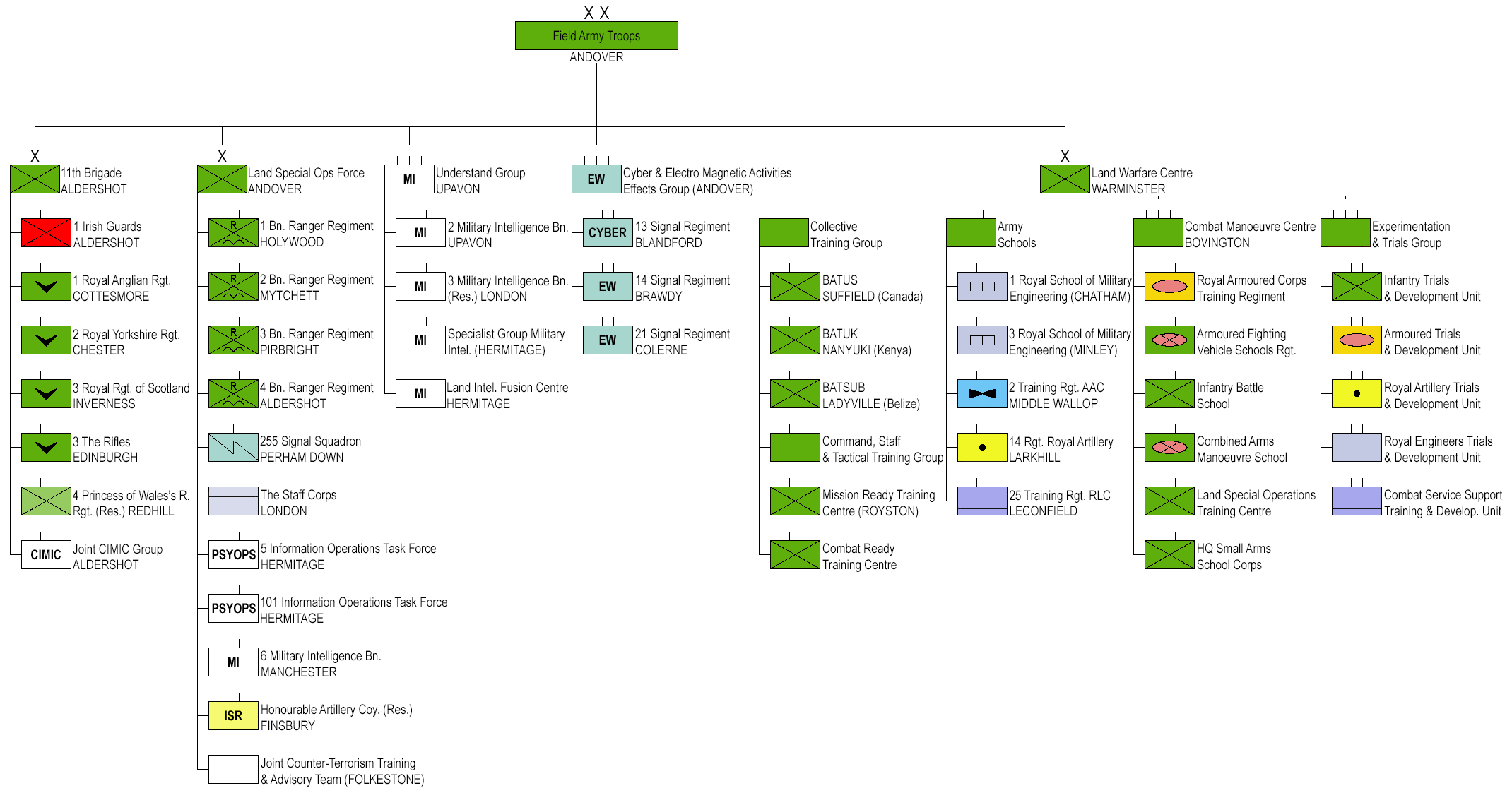
Field Army Troops organization as of July 2026 (click to enlarge)

==== 11th Brigade ====
- 11th Brigade, at Woodgate House, Aldershot Garrison
  - 1st Battalion, Irish Guards, at Mons Barracks, Aldershot Garrison
  - 1st Battalion, Royal Anglian Regiment, at Kendrew Barracks, Cottesmore (Near Surface Infantry Battalion)
  - 2nd Battalion, Royal Yorkshire Regiment, at Dale Barracks, Chester (Near Surface Infantry Battalion)
  - 3rd Battalion, Royal Regiment of Scotland, at Fort George, Inverness (Near Surface Infantry Battalion)
  - 3rd Battalion, The Rifles, at Dreghorn Barracks, Edinburgh (Near Surface Infantry Battalion)
  - 4th Battalion, Princess of Wales's Royal Regiment (Army Reserve), at Linkfield House, Redhill
  - Joint CIMIC Group, at Mellor Building, Aldershot Garrison

==== Land Special Operations Force ====
- Land Special Operations Force, at Marlborough Lines, Andover
  - 255 Signal Squadron, Royal Corps of Signals, at Swinton Barracks, Perham Down
  - 1st Battalion, Ranger Regiment, at Palace Barracks, Holywood
  - 2nd Battalion, Ranger Regiment, at Keogh Barracks, Mytchett
  - 3rd Battalion, Ranger Regiment, at Elizabeth Barracks, Pirbright Camp
  - 4th Battalion, Ranger Regiment, at New Normandy Barracks, Aldershot Garrison
  - 5 Information Operations Task Force, in Hermitage
  - 101 Information Operations Task Force, in Hermitage
  - 6 Military Intelligence Battalion, in Manchester
  - Honourable Artillery Company, at Armoury House, Finsbury (Army Reserve)
  - The Staff Corps
  - Joint Counter-Terrorism Training and Advisory Team, at Risborough Barracks, Folkestone

==== Understand Group ====
- Understand Group
  - Land Intelligence Fusion Centre, at Denison Barracks Hermitage
  - Specialist Group Military Intelligence, at Denison Barracks, Hermitage
  - 2 Military Intelligence Battalion, Intelligence Corps, at Trenchard Lines, Upavon
  - 3 Military Intelligence Battalion, Intelligence Corps, in London (Army Reserve)

==== Surveillance Group ====
- Surveillance Group

==== Cyber and Electro Magnetic Activities Effects Group ====
- Cyber and Electro Magnetic Activities Effects Group, in Andover
  - 13 Signal Regiment, Royal Corps of Signals, in Blandford (Cyber, Tri-Service unit; will move to Corsham by 2028)
  - 14 Signal Regiment, Royal Corps of Signals, in Brawdy (Electronic Warfare; will move to Innsworth by 2028)
  - 21 Signal Regiment, Royal Corps of Signals, in Colerne (Electronic Warfare; will move to Innsworth by 2028)

==== Land Warfare Centre ====
- Land Warfare Centre, in Warminster
  - Collective Training Group
    - British Army Training Unit Suffield (BATUS), at Suffield (Canada)
    - British Army Training Unit Kenya (BATUK), at Nanyuki (Kenya)
    - British Army Training and Support Unit Belize (BATSUB), at Price Barracks, Ladyville (Belize)
    - Command, Staff and Tactical Training Group (CSTTG)
    - Mission Ready Training Centre (MRTC), at Royston
    - Combat Ready Training Centre, at Salisbury Plain Training Area
  - Army Schools
    - The Royal School of Military Engineering Group (RSME)
      - 1 Royal School of Military Engineering Regiment, at Chatham
      - 3 Royal School of Military Engineering Regiment, at Minley
    - Army Aviation Centre
      - 2 Training Regiment, Army Air Corps, at Middle Wallop Flying Station
    - The Royal School of Artillery (RSA)
      - 14 Regiment Royal Artillery, at Larkhill
    - Defence College of Support (DCSp)
      - Defence School of Logistics and Administration at Worthy Down
      - Defence School of Policing and Guarding at Southwick Park
      - Defence School of Transport at Leconfield
        - 25 Training Regiment, Royal Logistic Corps, at Leconfield
  - Experimentation and Trials Group
    - Infantry Trials and Development Unit (ITDU)
    - Armoured Trials and Development Unit (ATDU)
    - Royal Artillery Trials and Development Unit (RA TDU)
    - Royal Engineers Trials and Development Unit (RE TDU)
    - Combat Service Support Training and Development Unit (CSS TDU)
  - Combat Manoeuvre Centre
    - Royal Armoured Corps Training Regiment, at Bovington
    - Armoured Fighting Vehicle Schools Regiment, at Bovington
    - Infantry Battle School, at Brecon
    - Combined Arms Manoeuvre School, at Warminster
    - Land Special Operations Training Centre, at Pirbright
    - HQ Small Arms School Corps
    - Gurkha Company (Tavoleto), Training Support Unit
  - Land Command Staff College (LCSC), at Shrivenham and Warminster

== Joint Aviation Command ==
Joint Aviation Command (JAC) brings tri-service helicopters and unmanned aerial systems together under one command, providing lift, find and attack capabilities.

The British Army contribution to the Joint Aviation Command consists of:

- Joint Aviation Command, at Middle Wallop Flying Station (reports to Commander Field Army)
  - Army Aviation Centre, at Middle Wallop Flying Station
    - 2 (Training) Regiment Army Air Corps (Ground Crew Training), at Middle Wallop Flying Station
    - 7 (Training) Regiment Army Air Corps (AH64E Apache Training), at Middle Wallop Flying Station
  - 32nd Regiment Royal Artillery, at Larkhill Garrison (Miniature Unmanned Aerial Systems)
  - 47th Regiment Royal Artillery, at Larkhill Garrison (Watchkeeper WK450)
  - Joint Helicopter Support Squadron, at RAF Benson

== Home Command ==
Home Command consists of:

- Regional Command - to ensure delivery of a secure home front and forces and families in Brunei and Nepal. When not engaged with operational commitments or when units may report to the Standing Joint Commander (UK) or mission-specific training (e.g. when conducting routine civilian engagement, ranges, or ceremonial duties, units and formations may report through a Regional Point of Command (RPOC) to HQ Regional Command at Andover. Regional Command, as of 1 August 2019, has 38th (Irish) Brigade and 160th (Welsh) Brigade permanently under its command as RPOCs. Commander Regional Command is also Commander Army Cadet Force & Combined Cadet Force.
- London District - commands all the Army forces within the London area and conducts ceremonial events.
- Recruiting and Initial Training Command - recruits and trains soldiers.
- Army Personnel Centre - deals with personnel issues and liaises with outside agencies.
- Sandhurst Group - deals with initial officer training and development at the Royal Military Academy Sandhurst, student military and leadership training through the University Officer Training Corps, professional development for members of the General Staff (Colonel and above) and overseeing the Centre for Army Leadership.

Commander Home Command, is also the Standing Joint Commander (UK) for responsible for the planning and execution of civil contingency operations within the UK landmass and territorial waters.

=== Headquarters London District ===
- Headquarters, London District at Horse Guards, City of Westminster
  - 238 Signal Squadron, Royal Corps of Signals (provides all communications for London District, administered by 10 Signal Regiment)
  - Household Cavalry Mounted Regiment at Hyde Park Barracks, Knightsbridge
  - 1st Battalion, London Guards, in St John's Hill Drill Hall, Battersea (Army Reserve, administers army reserve companies of the Foot Guards Regiments)
    - Ypres Company, Grenadier Guards (Army Reserve Light Infantry)
    - Number 17 Company, Coldstream Guards (Army Reserve Light Infantry)
    - G (Messines) Company, Scots Guards (Army Reserve Light Infantry)
    - No 15 (Loos) Company, Irish Guards (Army Reserve Light Infantry)
  - Public Duties Incremental Companies at Wellington Barracks
    - Nijmegen Company, Grenadier Guards
    - No. 7 Company, Coldstream Guards
    - F Company, Scots Guards
    - No. 9 Company, Irish Guards
    - No. 12 Company, Irish Guards
  - King's Troop Royal Horse Artillery at Royal Artillery Barracks, Woolwich with 13-pounder guns for ceremonial duties
  - 20 Transport Squadron, Royal Logistic Corps at Regent's Park Barracks, Regent's Park, (provides all the transport needs for London District and the Royal Household)
  - Royal Military School of Music, at HMS Nelson, Portsmouth.
  - Mounted Band of the Household Cavalry, at Combermere Barracks, Windsor
  - Band of the Grenadier Guards, at Wellington Barracks
  - Band of the Coldstream Guards, at Wellington Barracks
  - Band of the Scots Guards, at Wellington Barracks
  - Band of the Irish Guards, at Wellington Barracks
  - Band of the Welsh Guards, at Wellington Barracks
  - Countess of Wessex's String Orchestra, at Royal Artillery Barracks, Woolwich

=== Headquarters Regional Command ===
Headquarters Regional Command at Montgomery House, Aldershot is commanded by a Major-General. It is the Army's HQ for the UK, Nepal and Brunei, administering Army bases in the UK and providing civil engagement. Headquarters Regional Command is also the operational command for the Army Cadets.

==== 38th (Irish) Brigade ====
- 38th (Irish) Brigade, at Thiepval Barracks, Lisburn

==== 51st Infantry Brigade and Headquarters Scotland ====
- 51st Infantry Brigade and Headquarters Scotland, at Redford Barracks, Edinburgh
  - Balaklava Company, 5th Battalion, Royal Regiment of Scotland, at Redford Barracks, Edinburgh (Public duties)

==== 160th (Welsh) Brigade ====
- 160th (Welsh) Brigade, at The Barracks, Brecon
  - Joint Services Mountain Training Centre, in Anglesey

==== Headquarters Centre ====
- Headquarters Centre, at Kendrew Barracks, Cottesmore

==== Headquarters South East ====
- Headquarters South East, at Roebuck House, Aldershot Garrison

==== Headquarters North ====
- Headquarters North, at Bourlon Barracks, Catterick Garrison

==== Headquarters South West ====
- Headquarters South West, at Jellalabad Barracks, Tidworth Garrison

=== Army Recruiting and Initial Training Command ===
Army Recruiting and Initial Training Command was established on 1 April 2018, and oversees the Army Recruiting Group, which includes the National Recruitment Centre (NRC) and local Army Careers Centres, and is staffed by a mixture of Capita staff and Army personnel.

Army Training Units (ATU) are commanded and staffed by Army Reservists. Along with Regular Army Training Regiments (ATR), they provide Basic Training to Army Reserve recruits, except those joining 4 PARA and The Honourable Artillery Company. The current ATUs include:

- Army Training Unit North, at Queen Elizabeth Barracks, Strensall and Altcar Training Camp
- Army Training Unit Northern Ireland, at Ballykinler Training Centre
- Army Training Unit Scotland, at Redford Barracks, Edinburgh
- Army Training Unit West, at Wyvern Barracks, Exeter and Maindy Barracks, Cardiff

=== Army Personnel Centre ===
The centre is located in Glasgow. The APC's Chief Executive is the Military Secretary, who also holds the post of General Officer, Scotland. The APC deals with personnel issues and contact with outside agencies.

=== Royal Military Academy Sandhurst Group ===
Commandant Sandhurst is a Major-General.

- Royal Military Academy Sandhurst
  - Gurkha Demonstration Company (Sittang)
  - 44 Support Squadron, Royal Logistic Corps
- Army Officer Selection Board, at Leighton House, Westbury
- University Officer Training Corps
- Junior Staff Centre (Warminster)

=== Army Adventurous Training Group ===
- Headquarters, Army Adventurous Training Group, at Upavon
- Joint Service Mountain Training Centre, Anglesey
- Army Adventurous Training Centre, Upavon
- Joint Service Mountain Training Wing, Ballachulish
- Joint Service Mountain Training Wing, Halton
- Joint Service Mountain Training Wing, Anglesey
- Joint Service Mountain Training Wing, Bavaria
- Joint Service Mountain Training Wing, Llanrwst
- Joint Service Mountain Training Wing, Inverness
- Adventurous Training Foundation Wing, Castlemartin
- Adventurous Training Foundation Wing, Harz
- Joint Service Parachute Wing, Netheravon
- Joint Service Adventurous Training Wing, Cyprus

== British Army Germany ==
- British Army Germany, Sennelager
  - Land Training Fleet (Sennelager), at Athlone Barracks, Sennelager
  - British Army (Germany) Maintenance Detachment, at Ayrshire Barracks South, Mönchengladbach
    - Includes 23 Amphibious Engineer Squadron RE in Minden
  - Dorsten Ammunition Depot
  - Alpine Training Centre Hubertushaus, in Oberstdorf

== Order of precedence ==
The British Army parades according to the order of precedence, from right to left, with the unit at the extreme right being highest on the order. The Household Cavalry has the highest precedence, unless the Royal Horse Artillery parades with its guns.

== British Army units in other areas of the British Armed Forces ==
=== Cyber & Specialist Operations Command ===
- Defence Intelligence, in London
  - 42 Engineer Regiment (Geographic), Royal Engineers, at RAF Wyton (Geographical Support)
- Permanent Joint Headquarters
  - PJHQ plans and executes UK-led joint and multinational operations, including those involving British Army units, and operationally commands UK forces assigned to multinational operations led by other sovereign states. For example, during Operation Telic, the Chief of Joint Operations at PJHQ directed Major General Robin Brims, the UK Land Contingent Commander, through the UK National Contingent Commander, Air Marshal Brian Burridge.
  - British Forces Cyprus
    - 1st Battalion, Welsh Guards, at Episkopi Cantonment
    - The Highlanders, 4th Battalion, Royal Regiment of Scotland, at Dhekelia Cantonment
  - British Forces Gibraltar
    - Royal Gibraltar Regiment, in Gibraltar (Light Infantry)
  - Director Special Forces
    - 21 Special Air Service
    - 22 Special Air Service
    - 23 Special Air Service
    - Special Reconnaissance Regiment
    - Special Forces Support Group
    - 18 (UKSF) Signal Regiment

=== Navy Command ===
- UK Commando Force
  - 29 Commando Regiment Royal Artillery, in Plymouth (Commando Artillery)
  - 24 Commando Royal Engineers, in Chivenor (Commando Engineers)

=== Air Command ===
- 22 Group, Defence College of Technical Training (DCTT)
  - 11 Signal Regiment, Royal Corps of Signals, Defence School of Communications and Information Systems at Blandford Camp
  - 8 Training Battalion, Royal Electrical and Mechanical Engineers, Defence School of Electronic and Mechanical Engineering (DSEME) at MOD Lyneham

== See also ==
- List of roles in the British Army
- List of British Army installations
- Future Soldier
- Structure of the Royal Air Force

== References and sources ==
Sources

- A Guide to Appointments and Invitations for Defence Staffs within High Commissions and Embassies in London, UK Ministry of Defence, June 2005 edition

Citations
