= RAF Innsworth =

Non flying Royal Air Force station in England

RAF Innsworth
- Near Innsworth, Gloucestershire in England
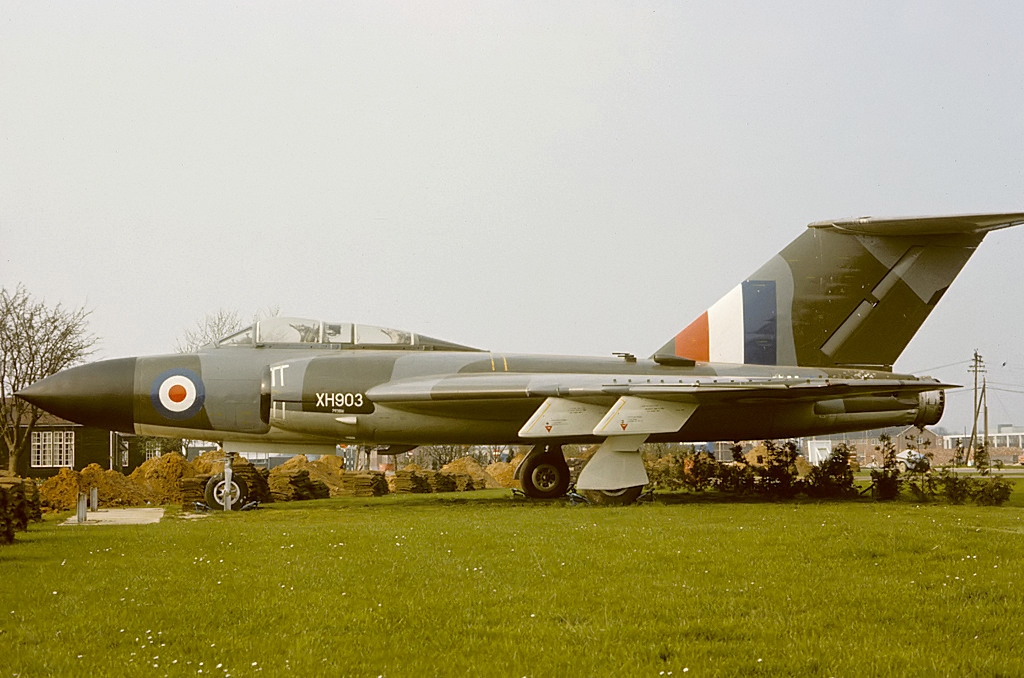
- Gloster Javelin FAW9 'XH903' whilst on display during 1974 as RAF Innsworth's gate guardian.

- Multos sustentare (Latin for 'Home to many')

Site information
- Type: Non-flying administrative, headquarters and support station
- Owner: Ministry of Defence
- Operator: Royal Air Force
- Condition: Closed

Location
- Location in Gloucestershire RAF Innsworth (the United Kingdom)
- Coordinates: 51°53′35″N 2°11′50″W
- Area: 75 hectares

Site history
- Built: 1940
- In use: 1940–2008
- Fate: Transferred to British Army and became Imjin Barracks.

RAF Innsworth was a non-flying Royal Air Force station located on the North side of the city of Gloucester in England. The station closed in March 2008 and, for the last 13 years of its life, was the headquarters of Personnel and Training Command. The site was transferred to the British Army and renamed Imjin Barracks, becoming the home of the Allied Rapid Reaction Corps in 2010.

== History ==
=== Second World War ===
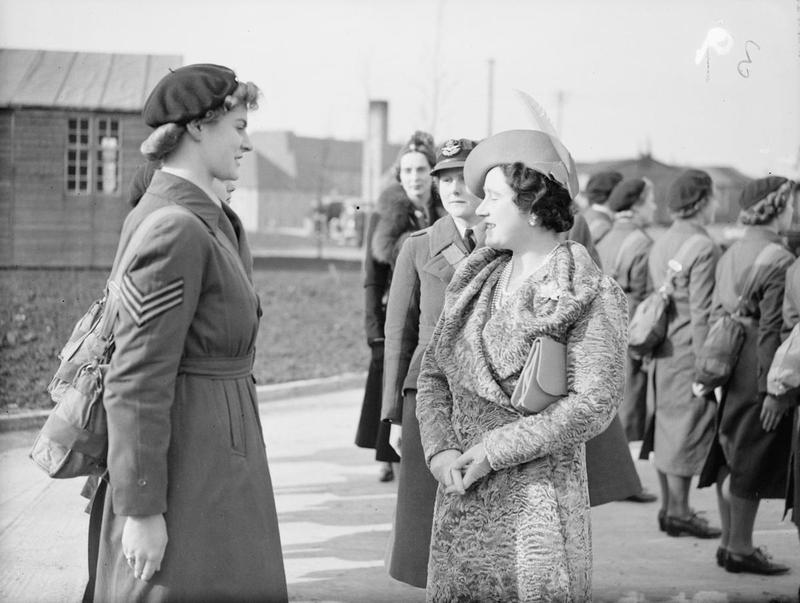
Queen Elizabeth chatting with a WAAF sergeant whilst visiting RAF Innsworth during the Second World War.

The station opened in 1940, the first unit based there being No 7 School of Technical Training, who trained engine and airframe fitters and mechanics. More than 2,000 officers and men were based at Innsworth by the time training began, in earnest, in 1941, this being delayed due to the arrival of 1500 RAF evacuees from Dunkirk.

In December 1941, No 2 WAAF Depot was opened at Innsworth and, from then on, the Station became increasingly associated with the Women's branch of the service. By the end of 1941, the strength of the Station had risen to more than 4,000, including trainees. Eventually, it was decided to reserve the Station almost exclusively for WAAF training, including barrage balloon training, amongst other vital roles.

=== Post-war ===
By the end of the war, nearly 5,000 people were living on the Station, three quarters of them WAAF. It retained its training role, with the opening of No. 2 RAF School of Cookery in 1948. It was also the home to No. 33 Wing RAF Regiment which deployed squadrons to emergencies in Cyprus and Northern Ireland. The station housed the Education Book Depot, which would have come in handy with both Nos. 7 & 13 Schools of Recruit Training. Innsworth was also the headquarters of No.4 Police District, and maintained a police presence up until very recently, when it was the HQ of PSS (WR).

In 1951, the headquarters of the RAF Record Office, which had been based nearby in Gloucester and Barnwood, moved to the station and gained Group status. Three years later, in 1954, No. 5 Personnel Despatch Unit arrived, charged with the administration and processing of personnel selected for overseas service. It was still there in 1958.

Just after the war ended, the RAF Base Accounts Office moved from York to Gloucester and grew into the Central Pay Office and became part of the RAF Personnel and Training Command, which formed in 1994, based at Innsworth. Many other changes have taken place at Innsworth over recent years: these include the formation of Personnel Management Agency, contractorisation of the Station Support Services and the transfer of certain administrative functions (RAF pay and pensions) to the tri Service, Armed Forces Personnel Administration Agency (AFPAA), all in 1997. In March / April 2005 the MOD Medals Office and Joint Casualty and Compassionate Centre (JCCC) were established at Innsworth under AFPAA management.

The station had always maintained a close association with the city of Gloucester, and on 7 April 1960, received the Honour of the Freedom of the City. The station has subsequently also received the freedoms of the Borough of Tewkesbury on 28 April 1977 and the Borough of Cheltenham in October 1986.

== Closure ==
=== RAF Drawdown ===
In 2005, it was announced that HQ Personnel and Training Command was to co-locate with HQ RAF Strike Command at RAF High Wycombe. The new co-located HQs were subsequently merged to form Air Command and the decision was taken to close RAF Innsworth. The drawdown took place over the next three years, with elements of the Personnel Management Agency moved to High Wycombe and RAF Cranwell and RAF Innsworth finally closed on 31 March 2008.

=== Transfer to British Army ===
Control of Innsworth was transferred to the British Army on 21 November 2008, when it was renamed Imjin Barracks. In 2010, the station also became home to the NATO Allied Rapid Reaction Corps, which relocated to Innsworth from the Rheindahlen Military Complex in Germany. This is still the situation in late 2024.
