= 1st Signal Brigade (United Kingdom) =

1st Signal Group 1st Signal Brigade 1st (United Kingdom) Signal Brigade
- 1st Signal Brigade Formation Sign
- Active: 1968—1987; 1995—Present
- Country: United Kingdom
- Branch: British Army
- Type: Signals
- Role: Communications brigade
- Size: Brigade
- Part of: Allied Rapid Reaction Corps
- Garrison/HQ: Imjin Barracks, Innsworth, UK formerly Rhine Garrison, Germany
- Engagements: Bosnian War

Commanders
- Current commander: Brigadier Brian Jeffery

The 1st Signal Brigade, formerly known as the 1st Signal Group, is a brigade of the British Army. The group was first formed in 1968 as a result of the 1966 Defence White Paper which expanded support for NATO and the British Army of the Rhine. In 1987, the group was disbanded and merged into the 2nd Signal Brigade. In 1995, the brigade was reformed and has since deployed on operations across the globe in support of NATO and HQ Allied Rapid Reaction Corps.

== History ==
=== First Formation ===
On 1 April 1968, as a result of the 1966 Defence White Paper, 1st Signal Group (Strategic Communications (STRATCO)) was formed at Erskine Barracks, Wilton. The new formation was formed to command those UK-based signal units earmarked for NATO reinforcement and 'Out of Area' operations. The Group was also known as Headquarters, Army Strategic Command (Signals). Under this command, the group was tasked with providing communications for the 5th Division and other Army Groups with no signals support.

After formation, the group commanded the following units:

- Headquarters, 1st Signal Group, at Erskine Barracks, Wilton
  - 14th Signal Regiment (Defence Communications Network), at Norton Barracks, Worcester
  - 30th Signal Regiment (Strategic Reserve Support), at Evans Lines, Blandford Camp
  - 223 Signal Squadron (Radio), at Bushfields Camp, Winchester
  - 602 Signal Troop (Special Communications), at (either) The Barracks, Brecon (later moving to or at) Bicester Garrison

Following the 1975 Mason Review, the group was reorganised so that it oversaw all oversees signal units, leaving the UKLF support role to the 2nd Signal Brigade. The group was therefore reorganised into the following organisation:

- Headquarters, 1st Signal Group, at Erskine Barracks, Wilton
  - 30th Signal Regiment (Strategic Reserve Support), at Evans Lines, Blandford Camp
  - 216 Parachute Signal Squadron, at Arnhem Barracks, Aldershot Garrison
  - 234 Signal Squadron (Malta), at Pembroke Army Garrison, Pembroke, State of Malta
  - 249 Signal Squadron (Allied Mobile Force (Land)), at Old Sarum Camp, Salisbury
  - 254 Signal Squadron (United Nations Forces Cyprus)
  - 603 Signal Troop (Middle East), at RAF Masirah, Sultanate of Oman
  - 633 Signal Troop (Belize), at Airfield Camp, Ladyville, British Honduras
  - 642 Signal Troop (Gibraltar), at Devil's Tower Camp, Gibraltar

In 1979, the group HQ was moved to Tidworth in accordance with the reforms of the 1975 Mason Review. In 1980, the Commandant of the Royal Corps of Signals made a visit to Blandford where he announced possible changes to the group and the overall signal group. As part of this announcement, the master of signals announced 1 Signal Group's role would change, and be able to help with the "Rhodesian Situation". The group was later involved in this when it supported the communications for a smooth independence movement.

In 1982, the group was re-titled with accordance with the 1981 Defence White Paper [The Way Forward], to become the 1st Signal Brigade. In addition to the name changes, the brigade also gained command of 244 Signal Squadron (Air Support) at RAF Brize Norton. In 1987, the group was disbanded and merged into the larger 2nd Signal Brigade.

=== Reformation ===
Following the Dissolution of Yugoslavia, increasing tensions in the region lead to a United Nations peacekeeping operation known throughout NATO as Operation Resolute, later the Implementation Force (IFOR). Under this operation, Headquarters Allied Rapid Reaction Corps was deployed, and shortly after headquarters 1st (United Kingdom) Signal Brigade was formed at Rheindahlen Garrison, Germany. The new brigade was tasked specifically with overseeing the units deployed on the operation, and later those supporting HQ ARRC. In December 1995 the brigade deployed to Bosnia and Herzegovina on Op Resolute. Brigade strength was 1,900 troops and 50% of the HQ Staff of 25 were mobilised Reserves or TA soldiers.

The brigade's organisation on formation remained the same till 2013 following Army 2020:

- Headquarters, 1st (United Kingdom) Signal Brigade, at Joint Headquarters Rheindahlen, Rheindahlen Garrison, Germany
  - 7th Signal Regiment (Allied Rapid Reaction Corps), at Javelin Barracks, Niederkrüchten
  - 16th Signal Regiment, at Javelin Barracks, Niederkrüchten
  - Allied Rapid Reaction Corps Support Battalion, Royal Logistic Corps, at Ripon Lines, Joint Headquarters Rheindahlen
  - Royal Signals System Support Team (Germany)

Under the Defence in a Competitive Age programme and subsequent Future Soldier, the brigade will leave 6 (UK) Division and be directly subordinated to HQ Allied Rapid Reaction Corps. This move was completed by September 2021, joining 104th Logistic Support Brigade.

== Organisation ==
The brigade's current organisation, as of November 2024, is as follows:

- Brigade Headquarters, at Imjin Barracks, Innsworth Garrison
  - 299 Signal Squadron (Special Communications), Royal Corps of Signals (Army Reserve), Bletchley
  - 10th Signal Regiment, Royal Corps of Signals, at MOD Corsham
  - 16th Signal Regiment, Royal Corps of Signals, at MOD Stafford
  - 22nd Signal Regiment, Royal Corps of Signals, at MOD Stafford
  - 30th Signal Regiment, Royal Corps of Signals, at Gamecock Barracks, Bramcote
    - Regimental Headquarters, Queen's Gurkha Signals
  - 32nd Signal Regiment, Royal Corps of Signals (Army Reserve), in Glasgow — paired with 2 and 10 Signal Regiments
  - 39th Signal Regiment (The Skinners), Royal Corps of Signals (Army Reserve), in Bristol — paired with 3, 11 (RSS), 13, 14 (EW), 15, 16 and 21 Signal Regiments
  - Gurkha Allied Rapid Reaction Corps Support Battalion at Imjin Barracks, Innsworth
  - Allied Rapid Reaction Corps Military Police Battalion, Royal Military Police (Army Reserve), at Sir John Moore Barracks, Winchester

== Commanders ==
The following have commanded 1st Signal Brigade since its inception as a separate command:

1st Signal Brigade

- Colonel E J Winn (1968—1971)
- Colonel D L Sylvester-Bradley OBE (1971—1973)
- Colonel J H Hild MBE (1973—1976)
- Colonel Robert "Bob" Benbow (1976—1979)
- Colonel Keith H Olds (1979—1982)
- Brigadier Michael Marples OBE (1982—1987)

1st (UK) Signal Brigade

- Brigadier Tony Raper, Apr 1995 - Jan 1996
- Brigadier James Shaw, Jan 1996 - May 1998
- Brigadier Robert Baxter, May 1998 - Mar 2000
- Brigadier David McDowall, Mar 2000 - Jan 2002
- Brigadier Tim Inshaw, Jan 2002 - Jan 2004
- Colonel David Hargreaves, Jan - Mar 2004
- Brigadier Neil Couch, Mar 2004 - Sep 2005
- Brigadier Nick Pope, Sep 2005 - Dec 2007
- Brigadier Andy Bristow, Dec 2007 - Jul 2008
- Brigadier Ivan Hooper, Jul 2008 - Nov 2010
- Brigadier David Robson, Nov 2010 - Sep 2012
- Brigadier Tim Carmichael, Sep 2012 - Aug 2014
- Brigadier Sharon Nesmith, Aug 2014–2016
- Brigadier Paul R. Griffiths 2016–2019
- Brigadier John R. Collyer 2019–2021
- Brigadier Philip Muir 2021–2023
