= 87 Postal and Courier Regiment RLC =

87th Postal and Courier Regiment, Royal Logistic Corps, was a regiment of the Territorial Army in the United Kingdom.

The regiment was formed in the Royal Logistic Corps in 1993 with three squadrons. In 2006, the regiment was disbanded, with 871 & 872 Squadrons transferred to the 88th Postal and Courier Regiment. As of 2014, 871 Squadron forms a part of 162 Regiment RLC Postal Courier & Movements. 871 Squadron is a Regional Reserve Sub-Unit based in Marlow, Buckinghamshire.

== Squadrons ==
- 871 Squadron
- 872 Squadron
- 873 Squadron
