= Gloucester and Cheltenham Green Belt =

Area protected from development in Gloucestershire, England

Gloucester & Cheltenham green belt showing extents, and districts. Green belt County borders District borders

The Gloucester and Cheltenham Green Belt is a green belt environmental and planning policy that regulates the rural space throughout mainly the South West region of England. It is completely within the county of Gloucestershire. Essentially, the function of the designation is to prevent further convergence between the conurbations of Gloucester and Cheltenham. It is managed by local planning authorities on guidance from central government.

== Geography ==
Land area taken up by the green belt is 6,694 hectares (66.94 km^{2}; 25.85 sq mi), 0.05% of the total land area of England (2010). It is mainly within Tewkesbury district, with small portions within the fringes of the Cheltenham and Cotswold districts. Innsworth is the largest community within the green belt.

Landscape features and facilities within the area include Staverton Airport, Cheltenham Racecourse, rivers Chelt, Swilgate and Hyde Brook, Imjin Barracks and MOD Boddington, several parks and woods, Briarfields campsite, Churchdown and Crickley hills, and the Church of the Holy Trinity in Badgeworth.

Much of the boundary is formed by local roads such as the A38 and the M5. The green belt lies next to the Cotswold Area of Outstanding Natural Beauty. Due to it lying across the Gloucester-Cheltenham metropolitan area, responsibility and co-ordination lies with local unitary and district councils as these are the local planning authorities.

== History ==
The Green Belt was first drawn up in 1968 with the Gloucestershire Development Plan. The Gloucestershire County Structure Plan in 1981 extended this to include an area north of Cheltenham to protect the green space between Cheltenham and Bishop's Cleeve. No portion was defined within Gloucester as the city boundary is drawn tightly around the urban area.

== Potential merger of Cheltenham and Gloucester ==
In May 2024, under plans by Gloucestershire County Council, it was reported that there are secret talks to formally merge the conurbations of Cheltenham and Gloucester with each other. The plans suggest that around ten new garden towns could be built around the green belt at Boddington which if removed would result in the complete merger of both boroughs. Doing so would facilitate and effectively merge the two into a supercity. The move has been criticised by both Cheltenham Borough Council and Gloucester City Council.

== See also ==
- Green belt (United Kingdom)
