= Normandy Barracks =

Normandy Barracks may refer to:

- Normandy Barracks, Aldershot, known as New Normandy Barracks, in Aldershot, Hampshire, England
- Normandy Barracks, Leconfield, home of the Defence School of Transport in East Riding of Yorkshire, England
- Normandy Barracks (Germany), British Army base in North Rhine-Westphalia, Germany
