= 29 Regiment RLC =

- Active: 1982 - present
- Country: United Kingdom
- Branch: British Army
- Role: Postal Courier and Movement
- Size: Regiment; 481 personnel
- Part of: 104th Logistic Support Brigade
- Garrison/HQ: Duke of Gloucester Barracks, South Cerney
- Website: 29 Regiment RLC

29 Regiment RLC is a regiment of the Royal Logistic Corps of the British Army.

== Structure ==
The regiment's current structure is as follows:

- 55 Headquarters Squadron
- 50 Movement Control Squadron
- 59 Movement Control Squadron
- 69 Movement Control Squadron
- 80 Postal Courier Squadron
- 99 Postal Courier and Movement Control Squadron (DISBANDED 2022)

The regiment is paired with the reserve 162 Regiment RLC for training and operations.
