= 17 Port and Maritime Regiment RLC =

17 Port & Maritime Regiment RLC
- Full ahead together
- Active: 1949 - Present
- Country: United Kingdom
- Branch: British Army
- Role: Logistics
- Size: 549 personnel
- Part of: 104th Logistic Support Brigade
- Garrison/HQ: McMullen Barracks, Marchwood Military Port
- Mascot: Seahorse
- Corps: Royal Logistic Corps

Insignia
- Tactical recognition flash

17 Port and Maritime Regiment is a regiment of the British Army's Royal Logistic Corps. Based in the Hampshire village of Marchwood, near Southampton, the unit is the British Army's Regular Port & Maritime capability, and is supported by 165 Port and Maritime Regiment RLC, of the Army Reserve.

== History ==
The regiment was first formed as 17 Port Training Regiment Royal Engineers, at the existing Marchwood Military Port (near Southampton), Hampshire in 1949. Since the Second World War, military vessels have operated in support of many major operations, such as during the Suez Crisis, conflicts in Belize and Borneo and particularly in the Falklands War, where over 75% of all stores were landed by Mexeflote Rafts.

The regiment initially comprised 51 and 52 Port Squadrons Royal Engineers. It was later joined by 53 Port Maintenance Squadron. On 15 July 1965, the Regiment transferred to the Royal Corps of Transport (RCT) and 17 Port Regiment Workshop REME (Royal Electrical & Mechanical Engineers) was formed at that time. The regiment was originally accommodated in a war time Nissen hut type of camp in the field that is just beyond the northern boundary of Byams House, which later became the Officers Mess. In 1993, the regiment was transferred to the Royal Logistic Corps (RLC), due to amalgamation of the RCT with four other Corps. At the time of joining into the RLC, the regiment was organised as follows:

- Regimental Headquarters
- 51 Port Squadron
- 52 Port Squadron
- 53 Port Support Squadron
- 265 Port Squadron (V), at Prince William of Gloucester Barracks, Grantham

In 2011 and 2012, the regimental headquarters and elements from the Squadrons deployed as the Theatre Logistic Regiment in Camp Bastion. Later in 2012, the regiment was required at short notice to set up and run the accommodation camp at Tobacco Docks on the river Thames in London, in support of the military personnel who were in turn supporting the 2012 London Olympics. Laster, in 2013, the Regiment deployed on a United Nations Peace-keeping tour to Cyprus (Operation TOSCA).

The most recent military rail operations were in the Kosovo War, when 79 Railway Squadron RLC operated the line between Thessaloniki in Greece to Kosovo in Serbia. During Operation Telic in Iraq in 2003, Rail Troop of 79 Port Clearance Squadron RLC opened up the rail link between Basra and Baghdad, in cooperation with a Royal Engineers Specialist Team.

Under the Army 2020 programme, the regiment was paired with its reserve counterpart, 165 Port and Maritime Regiment RLC.

== Operations ==
The current units are:

- 53 Headquarters and Enabling Squadron
- 51 Port Squadron
- 52 Port Squadron
- Regimental Workshop, Royal Electrical and Mechanical Engineers

The regiment is based out of McMullen Barracks in the village of Marchwood, on the west bank of Southampton Water, on the fringe of the New Forest. The barracks sits at Marchwood Military Port, the Ministry of Defence's Sea Mounting Centre (SMC). It also operates the only military Dive Team in the RLC.

== Ensigns of British Army vessels ==
Ensign flown by vessels of 17 Port and Maritime Regiment, Royal Logistic Corps.

The Army ensign flown by British Army vessels commanded by a commissioned officer.

Originally there was no British Army Ensign, the crossed swords ensign being the ensign of the Royal Army Service Corps (which was responsible for offshore military transport). When the Royal Corps of Transport (RCT) was formed in 1965, it took on this responsibility; the task of designing an Army Ensign was given to HQ Maritime Group RCT Portsmouth, who produced a Blue Ensign defaced by crossed swords superimposed with the royal crest. It was approved by the Queen and announced in Army Order 53/66, and Defence Council Instruction (General) 62/67. The ensign was first flown on 17 May 1967 by Tank Landing Craft engaged in Exercise Wagon Trail. The Army Ensign was the army equivalent of the navy's White Ensign, while the crossed sword ensign was comparable to the vertical anchor Blue Ensign of the Royal Fleet Auxiliary Service. The army copied navy tradition by flying the Union Jack in the bows of ships being launched, with the Army Flag (instead of the Admiralty Flag) amidships. The last HMAVs, Arakan and Ardennes, were decommissioned in 1998, and the Army Ensign became dormant.

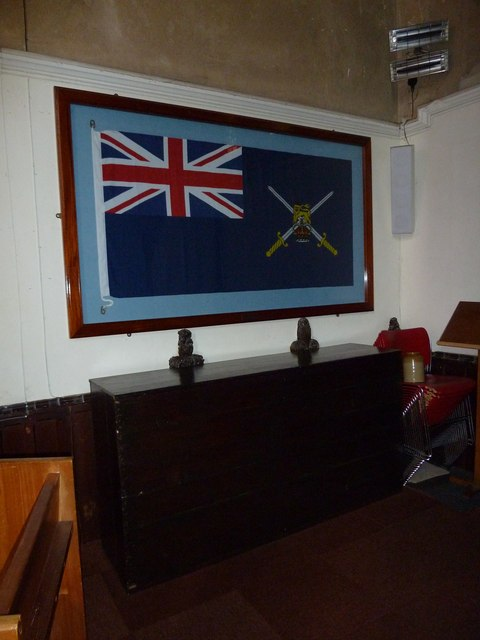
Army Ensign of HMAV Arakan laid up in St John's Church, Marchwood.
