= 104 Theatre Sustainment Brigade =

- TRF of 104 Theatre Sustainment Brigade
- Active: 1993–Present
- Country: United Kingdom
- Branch: British Army
- Type: Military logistic support formation
- Role: Force support and Control
- Size: Brigade
- Part of: Allied Rapid Reaction Corps
- Brigade HQ: Duke of Gloucester Barracks, South Cerney

104 Theatre Sustainment Brigade is a specialist logistic support formation of the British Army. The brigade is the only one of its kind, and as such contains many of the special units of the Royal Logistic Corps and Royal Electrical and Mechanical Engineers.

== Mission ==
104 Theatre Sustainment Brigade is the Army’s theatre logistic enabling formation whose role is to deliver scalable logistic enabling force elements at readiness and is prepared to provide a 1* HQ to act as or in support of the HQ National Support Element / Joint Force Logistic Component for any UK deployment. It commands the entire Army’s logistic enabling capabilities ranging from Postal and Courier Services, Movement Control, Port and Maritime (which includes Vehicle Specialist), Operational Hygiene, Mortuary Affairs in addition to providing catering support, fuel storage and distribution, equipment and recovery support and logistic subject matter experts drawn from 2 Operational Support Group. With these capabilities, the Brigade activates strategic and operational Lines of Communications; mounting and deploying forces that deliver specialist logistic effects in support of joint expeditionary and enduring operations whilst providing robust support for both UK and overseas contingency operations. The Brigade also operates the Sea Mounting Centre at Marchwood and the Joint Air Mounting Centre at South Cerney; ensuring that the UK end of deployments are fully enabled and effective at all times.

In September 2021 the brigade transferred from 1 (UK) Division to the Allied Rapid Reaction Corps.

== Organisation ==
The brigade's Future Soldier organisation is as follows:

- 104 Theatre Sustainment Brigade, in South Cerney
  - 9 Supply Regiment, Royal Logistic Corps, in Hullavington (Theatre Support Regiment)
  - 9 Theatre Support Battalion, Royal Electrical and Mechanical Engineers, in Aldershot (Equipment Support; unit to be established by 2025)
  - 17 Port and Maritime Regiment, Royal Logistic Corps, in Marchwood (Port and Maritime Regiment)
  - 29 Postal Courier and Movement Regiment, Royal Logistic Corps, in South Cerney (Movement Control Regiment)
  - 2 Operational Support Group, Royal Logistic Corps, in Grantham (Logistics Operational Support Group; moves to Cottesmore in 2025)
  - 152 Logistic Regiment, Royal Logistic Corps, in Belfast (Fuel Support Regiment - Reserve)
  - 162 Logistic Regiment, Royal Logistic Corps, in Nottingham (Movement Control and Communications Regiment - Reserve)
  - 165 Port and Maritime Regiment, Royal Logistic Corps, in Plymouth (Port and Maritime Regiment - Reserve)
  - 167 Regiment, Royal Logistic Corps, in Grantham (Catering Support Regiment - Reserve; moves to Cottesmore by 2027.)
