= Gurkha Allied Rapid Reaction Corps Support Battalion =

Unit of the British Army

- Battalion insignia
- Active: 1993–Present
- Country: United Kingdom of Great Britain and Northern Ireland
- Branch: British Army
- Type: Combat service support
- Size: Battalion
- Part of: 1st (United Kingdom) Signal Brigade
- Garrison/HQ: Imjin Barracks, Innsworth
- Nickname: Gurkha ARRC SP BN
- Engagements: Operation Grapple; Operation Agricola

The Gurkha Allied Rapid Reaction Corps Support Battalion, or simply the Gurkha ARRC Support Battalion (Gurkha ARRC Sp Bn) is a combat support unit of the British Army, and one of only three (Note: The other two being the ARRC MP Battalion (Army Reserve), and 280 (UK) Sign Sqn.) units permanently assigned to NATO. For administrative purposes, the Gurkha ARRC Support Battalion falls under the oversight of the Royal Logistic Corps, though employs members from many other cap badges.

== History ==
Following the Fall of the Berlin Wall, and subsequent Dissolution of the Soviet Union, the British Army of the Rhine, and I (British) Corps were disbanded in 1994. Later that year, at Joint Headquarters Rheindahlen, the Allied Rapid Reaction Corps was formed as a static multinational three-star command. As part of this new corps, two new units were formed to be directly subordinated; 280 (United Kingdom) Signal Squadron and the Headquarters Allied Rapid Reaction Corps Support Battalion. This new unit was formed through the redesignation of the old 1st British Corps Regiment, Royal Corps of Transport, itself formed through the amalgamation of 14 Transport Troop, and 170 Pioneer Headquarters Squadron. After formation, the new battalion was based at Ripon Barracks, Bielefeld, however the next year it moved to Ripon Lines, in Rheindahlen. In 1994, 14 Squadron absorbed 68 Squadron.

In 1995, the battalion was renamed as the Allied Rapid Reaction Corps Support Battalion. And then sometime after 1995, the battalion was assigned to 1st (United Kingdom) Signal Brigade; the United Kingdom's only star command assigned to the ARRC directly. In 2010, as part of the Strategic Defence and Security Review 2010, and subsequent Army 2020 announcement, all British troops were to withdraw from Germany by 2020. Therefore, in October 2010 the battalion along with HQ ARRC, moved to their current base at Imjin Barracks, Innsworth.

In 2015, after another defence and security review, called the Strategic Defence and Security Review 2015, and subsequent Army 2020 Refine, the ARRC is due to be expanded. As part of these changes, the battalion will become a full Gurkha unit. The battalion's current role is to provide enabling and force protection support to the ARRC NATO Warfighting HQ on all operations. The Battalion is currently ready to deploy, build and sustain the ARRC HQ anywhere in the world at a moment’s notice.

The battalion is equipped in a similar way to the mechanised infantry units of the army and close support units, armed with the Mastiff PPV and the 15 Tonne MAN truck system.

In August 2021, the battalion added the subtitle 'Gurkha'. Though the battalion has had Gurkhas for many years, it is now officially been subsumed into the Brigade of Gurkhas.

== Current Composition ==
Below is the current composition of the battalion:

- Battalion Headquarters
- Headquarters Squadron
  - Squadron Headquarters
  - Signals Troop, (Royal Gurkha Rifles and QOGLR)
  - Catering Troop, Royal Logistic Corps
  - Light Aid Detachment, Royal Electrical and Mechanical Engineers
  - Quartermaster's Department
- 14 Squadron
  - Squadron Headquarters
  - Close Support Troop (provides an assault pioneer capability and force protection to HQ ARRC, provided by the Royal Gurkha Rifles and Queen's Gurkha Engineers)
  - Power Troop (Royal Engineers)
  - Transport Troop (Royal Logistic Corps and Queen's Own Gurkha Logistic Regiment)
  - Forward Support Troop (RLC, QOGLR and Queen’s Gurkha Engineers (QGE))

== Footnotes ==
Notes

Citations
