= RAF South Cerney =

Former RAF station in Gloucestershire, England

RAF South Cerney
- Near South Cerney, Gloucestershire in England
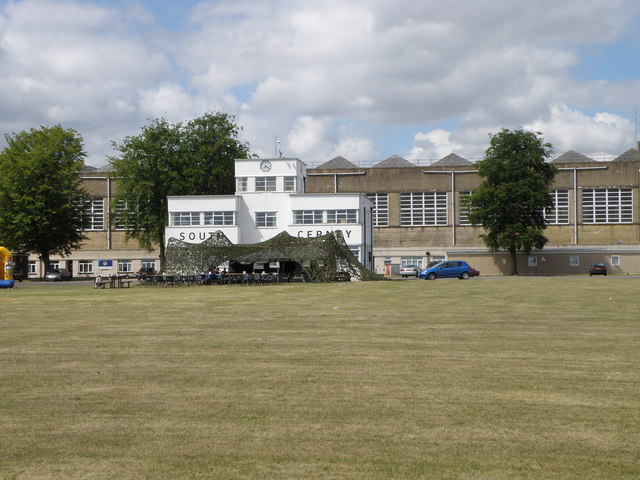
- Control Tower on the Airfield

Site information
- Type: Royal Air Force Station
- Owner: Ministry of Defence
- Operator: Royal Air Force
- Controlled by: RAF Flying Training Command

Location
- Shown within Gloucestershire RAF South Cerney (the United Kingdom)
- Coordinates: 51°41′27″N 001°55′28″W

Site history
- Built: 1936
- In use: 1937 - 1972
- Battles/wars: European theatre of World War II

Airfield information
- Identifiers: ICAO: EGCY
- Elevation: 111 metres (364 ft) AMSL
Runways
Direction	Length and surface
01/19	892 metres (2,927 ft) Grass
09/27	983 metres (3,225 ft) Grass

Royal Air Force South Cerney or more simply RAF South Cerney is a former Royal Air Force station located in South Cerney near Cirencester in Gloucestershire, England. It was built during the 1930s to conduct flying training. The airfield was turned over to the British Army in 1971 and is now known as the Duke of Gloucester Barracks.

== History ==
Construction of the airfield began in 1936 and it was still underway when it opened on 16 August 1937. No. 3 Flying Training School was the initial tenant and was equipped with a variety of biplane aircraft which were replaced by Airspeed Oxfords in mid-1938. When the Second World War began in August 1939, the school was redesignated as a Service Flying Training School (SFTS) and was equipped with 44 Oxfords and 31 Hawker Harts. Shortly afterwards the headquarters of No. 23 Group RAF, responsible for advanced flying training, was transferred to South Cerney with its communications flight. By the late summer of 1940, the Oxfords had replaced all of the Harts and the school was dedicated to multi-engine training.

No. 15 Service Flying Training School RAF was transferred to the base in early June 1940 with its Oxfords and North American Harvard trainers, but it moved to RAF Kidlington at the end of August. Soon afterwards, the syllabus of 3 SFTS changed to intermediate flying training and it continued in this role until 14 March 1942 when it was converted into No. 3 (Pilots) Advanced Flying Unit RAF to orient foreign-trained pilots to British conditions and standards.

During the Second World War a number of training units were posted to the airfield:

- No. 1 Initial Training School
- No. 2 Flying Training School RAF
- No. 27 Group Communication Flight RAF
- No. 83 Gliding School RAF
- No. 1519 (Beam Approach Training) Flight RAF
- No. 1539 (Beam Approach Training) Flight RAF
- Air Crew Allocation Unit
- Aircrew Officer Training School

The airfield was handed over to the Army on 1 July 1971 and was renamed the Duke of Gloucester Barracks.

Parts of "Piece of Cake", a 1988 British six-part television serial depicting the fictional life of a Royal Air Force fighter squadron during the first year of the Second World War, were filmed here.

== Runways ==
The site has two short runways that are regularly used by two commercial freefall parachuting businesses.

== See also ==
- List of former Royal Air Force stations
