= 25 Training Regiment RLC =

- Active: 2003–present
- Country: United Kingdom
- Branch: British Army
- Role: Logistics Training
- Size: Regiment
- Part of: Defence School of Transport
- Garrison/HQ: Normandy Barracks, Leconfield
- Website: 25 Training Regiment RLC

25 Training Regiment RLC is a training regiment of the Royal Logistic Corps of the British Army. It is part of the Defence School of Transport, located in Leconfield.

== Structure ==
The regiment comprises two squadrons:

- 109 Training Squadron
- 110 Training Squadron
