= 88 Postal and Courier Regiment RLC =

- Country: United Kingdom
- Branch: British Army
- Type: Regiment
- Role: Logistics
- Part of: Royal Logistic Corps
- Website: 88 Regiment RLC

88 Postal and Courier Regiment, Royal Logistic Corps, was a regiment of the Territorial Army in the United Kingdom.

== History ==
The regiment was originally formed as the 88th Postal and Courier Regiment, Royal Logistic Corps (Volunteers). Two squadrons were transferred to 87 Postal and Courier Regiment RLC in 2006. The regiment was absorbed into 162 Regiment RLC in 2013.

== Structure ==
The final structure was as follows:

- 871 Squadron
- 872 Squadron
- 883 Squadron
- 884 Squadron
