= Mason Review =

The 1975 Mason Review was a review of UK defence policy conducted by the Labour Government's Secretary of State for Defence, Roy Mason. The review was influenced by a Government decision to reduce the defence budget to 4.5% of Gross Domestic Product. The review was intended to anticipate defence needs during the period 1975–1985.

== Summary ==
The report made clear that despite the process of East−West Détente which was then gathering pace, the principal threat to the security of the UK remained the Soviet Union. Priority for UK defence resources was given to NATO commitments.

This led to four capabilities being emphasised in the review:

- UK contribution to NATO front-line forces in Germany, including the British Army on the Rhine.
- Anti-submarine warfare forces in the eastern Atlantic
- Home defence
- UK nuclear deterrent

To support this focus on Cold War theatres, most British forces in the Mediterranean Sea were to be reduced, and there were to be further reductions in the Far East.

== See also ==
- 1966 Defence White Paper
- 1981 Defence White Paper
- Options for Change (1990 restructuring)
- Military of the United Kingdom
