= Duke of Gloucester Barracks =

British Army barracks at South Cerney in Gloucestershire, England

- South Cerney
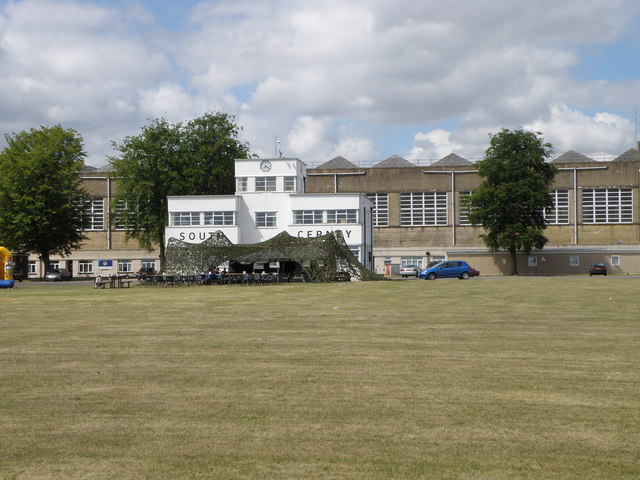
- The control tower on the airfield of the former RAF South Cerney, now Duke of Gloucester Barracks.

Site information
- Type: Barracks
- Owner: Ministry of Defence
- Operator: British Army
- Controlled by: Royal Logistic Corps

Location
- Location within Gloucestershire
- Coordinates: 51°41′27″N 01°55′28″W
- Area: 135 hectares

Site history
- Built: 1971
- In use: 1971–present

Garrison information
- Occupants: 104 Theatre Sustainment Brigade; 29 Postal Courier & Movement Regiment

The Duke of Gloucester Barracks is a British Army barracks at South Cerney in Gloucestershire.

== History ==
The barracks were established on the site of the former RAF South Cerney in 1971, when UK (Support) Postal and Courier Communications Unit, Royal Engineers (re-designated 2 Postal and Courier Regiment RE in 1979) and 29 Transport and Movement Regiment of the Royal Corps of Transport (now 29 Postal Courier & Movement Regiment of the Royal Logistic Corps) moved there.

== Based units ==
The following notable units are based at Duke of Gloucester Barracks.

=== Royal Logistic Corps ===
- 104 Theatre Sustainment Brigade
  - Headquarters 104 Theatre Sustainment Brigade
  - Joint Air Mounting Centre
  - 29 Postal Courier & Movement Regiment
    - 55 Headquarters Squadron
    - 50 Postal Courier and Movement Control Squadron
    - 59 Postal Courier and Movement Control Squadron
    - 69 Postal Courier and Movement Control Squadron
    - 80 Postal Courier and Movement Control Squadron
    - 99 Postal Courier and Movement Control Squadron

The Royal Logistic Corps' Silver Stars Army Parachute Display Team is also based here.

== Role and operations ==
=== Royal Logistic Corps ===
The barracks are currently occupied by 29 Postal Courier & Movement Regiment, part of the 104th Logistic Support Brigade of the Royal Logistic Corps (RLC), and coming under the umbrella of Allied Rapid Reaction Corps, NATO's High Readiness Force (Land). The regiment's role is movements support and postal & courier capabilities. As of 1 November 2018, there was 481 personnel assigned to the regiment.

The headquarters of 104 Theatre Sustainment Brigade is also based at the barracks. The brigade directs the Army’s logistics enabling capabilities which include postal and courier services, movement control, port and maritime movements, operational hygiene, mortuary arrangements, catering, fuel storage & distribution and equipment & recovery support.

=== Joint Air Mounting Centre ===
The Joint Air Mounting Centre (JAMC) comes under the command of the 104 Theatre Sustainment Brigade and is managed by 29 Regt, alongside Royal Air Force personnel. It handles processing, security and baggage checks for all British troops embarking overseas on exercise or operational deployment, before they are transported by road to RAF Brize Norton for departure from the UK. This allows more efficient processing of personnel and freight and relieves pressure at Brize Norton, which is located around 21 miles away in Oxfordshire.
