= Defence School of Transport =

Educational institution in England

Defence School of Transport Normandy Barracks
- Near Leconfield, East Riding of Yorkshire in England
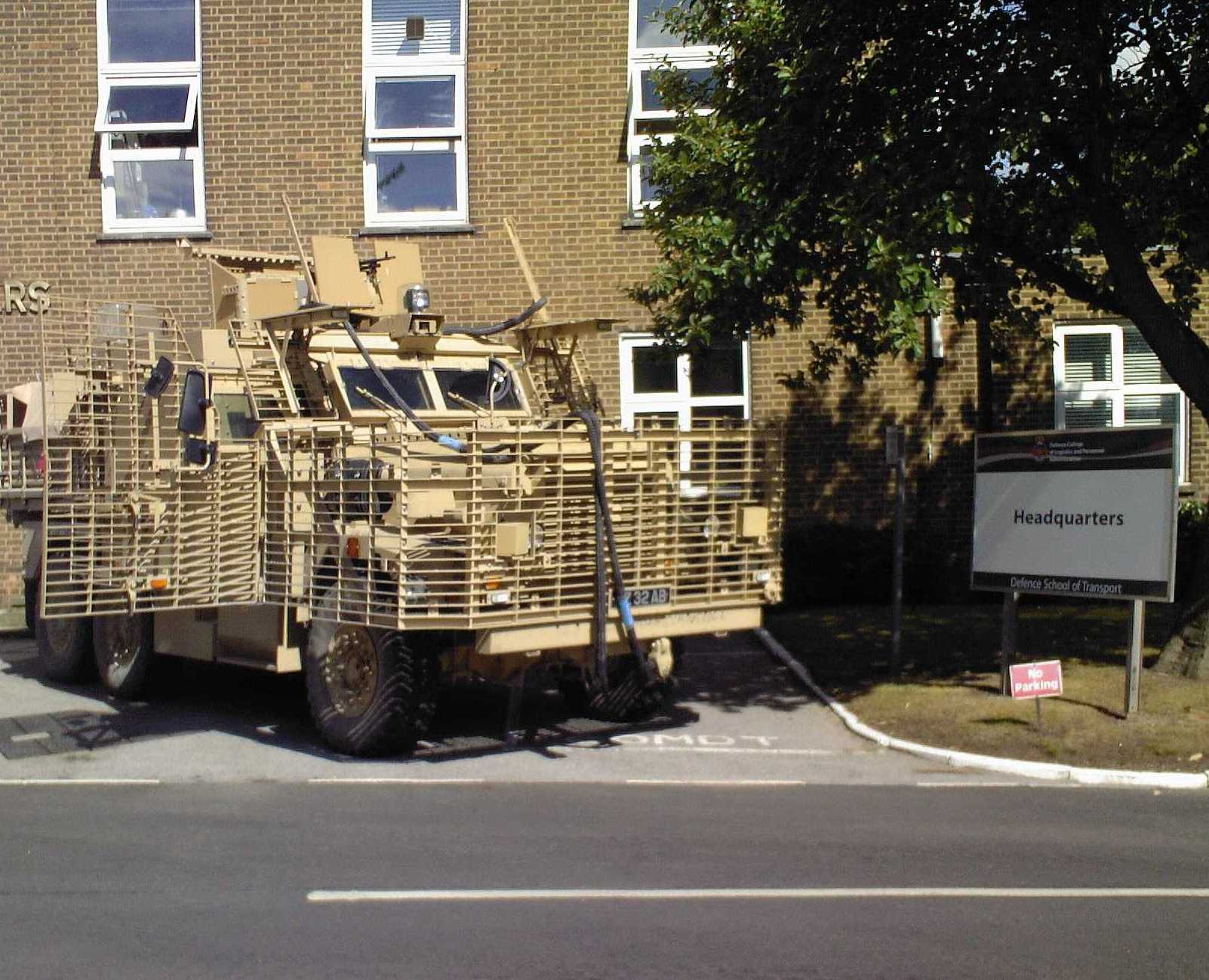
- Mastiff protective patrol vehicle outside the DST's Headquarters

- Badge of the Defence School of Transport

Site information
- Type: Tri-Service Training School
- Owner: Ministry of Defence
- Operator: British Army
- Controlled by: Defence College of Support

Location
- Shown within the East Riding of Yorkshire
- Coordinates: 53°52′46″N 000°26′00″W
- Area: 296 hectares (730 acres)

Site history
- Built: 1977
- In use: 1977 – present

Airfield information
- Elevation: 7 metres (23 ft) AMSL
Helipads
Number	Length and surface
01	Asphalt

The Defence School of Transport (DST) Leconfield is located at Normandy Barracks, Leconfield near Beverley, East Riding of Yorkshire in England.

It is a tri-service organisation which forms part of the Defence College of Support. It teaches driver and transport management training to personnel from the British Army, Royal Air Force and Royal Marines.

The site was formerly RAF Leconfield which closed in 1977 when the Army School of Mechanical Transport moved in. The school was renamed the Defence School of Transport in 1996, when it took on responsibility for training personnel of all three British armed forces.

== History ==
=== Background ===
Prior to 1964, army driver training was the responsibility of 6 Driver Training Battalion at Yeovil in Somerset and 15 Driver Training Battalion at Blandford in Dorset, both of the Royal Army Service Corps (RASC). In 1965, the role was transferred to the newly formed Royal Corps of Transport (RCT) where the majority of army drivers were trained in various training establishments, one of the largest being 12 Driver Training Regiment based at Aldershot.

The Army School of Mechanical Transport was formed on 1 April 1977 from a reorganisation of army driver training. The training headquarters and its Mechanical Transport Wing, along with 12 Driver Training Regiment RCT, 401 troop RCT based at South Cerney and previously separate vehicle training elements of the Royal Armoured Corps, Royal Artillery, Royal Corps of Signals, Army Air Corps and Royal Army Ordnance Corps all moved to the site of RAF Leconfield, which had closed as Royal Air Force station on 1 January 1977.

=== Establishment ===
In 1996, the school was renamed the Defence School of Transport when it became responsible for training personnel in the British Army, Royal Air Force and Royal Marines.

The school was awarded the freedom of the East Riding by the East Riding of Yorkshire Council in 2010.

In July 2013, the demolition of existing accommodation blocks began to allow the construction of four new blocks. The £28 million project, carried out by Lendlease on behalf of the Defence Infrastructure Organisation (DIO), was completed in March 2015 and provided 768 bed spaces for students.

25 Regiment of the Royal Logistic Corps relocated to DST in Summer 2019. This move consolidated the regiment in one location with the regimental headquarters and 109 Squadron moving from Deepcut Barracks in Surrey to Leconfield, where 110 Squadron had been based for some years.

== Units ==
The following units are based at Normandy Barracks.

- Defence School of Transport:
  - 111 Driver Training Squadron
  - 112 Driver Training Squadron
  - 113 Driver Training Squadron
  - 114 Driver Training Squadron
- 25 Training Regiment, Royal Logistic Corps are part of the Defence School of Transport and provide two training and duty of care squadrons:
  - 109 Training Squadron
  - 110 Training Squadron

== Role and operations ==
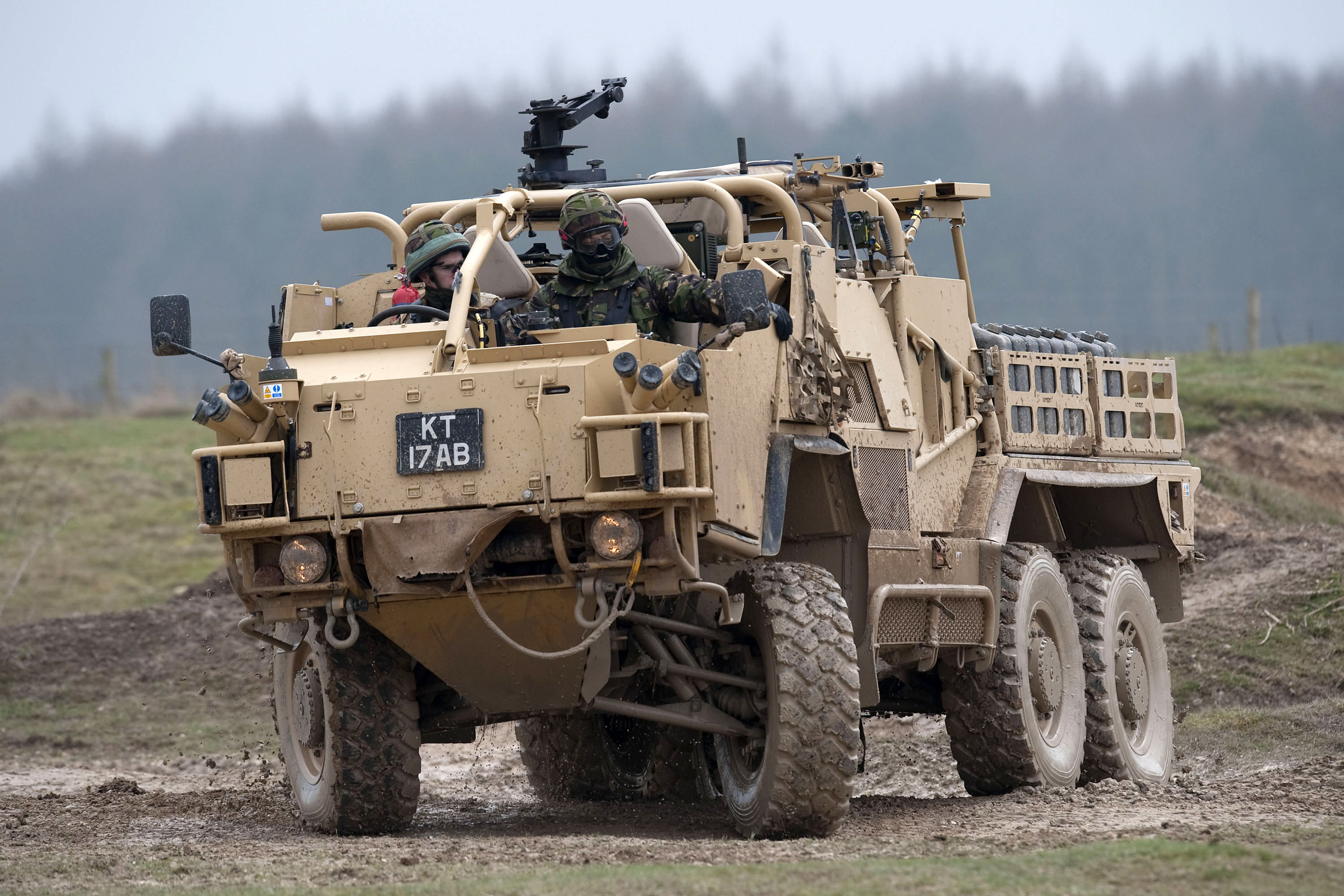
A Coyote Tactical Support Vehicle at the Driffield Training Area (Alamein Barracks), a satellite site of the school located near Leconfield.

The Defence School of Transport (DST) is a tri-service organisation which forms part of the Defence College of Support. It teaches driver and transport management training to personnel from the British Army, Royal Air Force and Royal Marines. It is the world's largest residential training establishment for fleet management and driver training and provides 150 different courses on transport matters for nearly 20,000 trainees a year, with the ability to train up to 1,500 at any one time. It has a fleet of approximately 1,300 vehicles ranging from cars, vans and trucks to mechanical handling equipment and specialised military vehicles.

113 Driver Training Squadron provides communications training to all regular and reserve Combat Service Support Arms such as the Royal Logistic Corps, Royal Army Medical Corps, Royal Military Police (RMP) and Royal Electrical and Mechanical Engineers. The Squadron also provides classroom based training on policy, legislation, MT accounting, the carriage of dangerous goods and hazardous materials. Training on a range of specialist vehicles and systems, such as the Bandvagn 206 all-terrain carrier and quad bikes is provided by 114 Driver Training Squadron.

25 Regiment RLC administers and manages the transition of all RLC drivers from basic training into their chosen career trade and ensures that basic soldier skills are maintained.

== Facilities ==
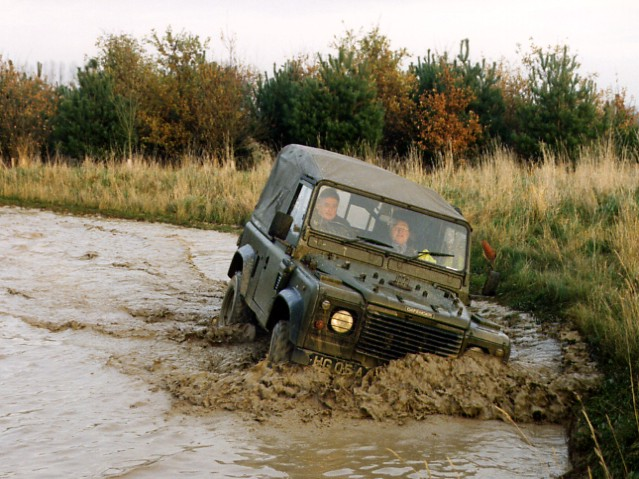
A Land Rover Wolf at the Defence School of Transport in 2004.

As well as the Leconfield site, there are seven satellite facilities in the south of England and a further site at Catterick in the north of England, delivering licence acquisition.

The school has 16 kilometres (9.9 mi) of road training circuits which includes roundabouts, traffic lights, junctions, a manoeuvring area with parking bays and a purpose built 1 in 8 sloped hill. Training also takes place on local public roads. There are 26 kilometres (16 mi) of cross-country training routes featuring forty artificial obstacles, two water crossings, a lake and various pools. Parts of the training areas reflect conditions which would be encountered on deployment in locations such as Afghanistan.

166,000 trees were planted to create five woodlands which are used for training in concealment and camouflage.
