= Leconfield =

Civil parish in the East Riding of Yorkshire, England

Coordinates: 53°52′44″N 0°27′32″W

- Location within the East Riding of Yorkshire
- Population: 2,127 (2011 census)
- OS grid reference: TA015436
  - London: 160 mi (260 km) S
- Civil parish: Leconfield
- Unitary authority: East Riding of Yorkshire
- Ceremonial county: East Riding of Yorkshire
- Region: Yorkshire and the Humber
- Country: England
- Sovereign state: United Kingdom
- Post town: BEVERLEY
- Postcode district: HU17
- Dialling code: 01964
- Police: Humberside
- Fire: Humberside
- Ambulance: Yorkshire
- UK Parliament: Beverley and Holderness

Leconfield is a village and civil parish in the East Riding of Yorkshire, England, about 3 miles (5 km) north-west of Beverley town centre on the A164 road. The civil parish consists of Leconfield, the village of Arram and the hamlet of Scorborough. The 2011 UK census gave the parish a population of 2,127, an increase on the 2001 UK census figure of 1,990.

== History ==
The name Leconfield probably derives from the Old English læccfeld meaning 'bog field'.

Other possible explanations of the name include the Norman times when it was an area where prisoners were held in open grassed areas. French worded roughly as’Le Con Field’

An old Anglo Saxon settlement was in the area called ‘Meh’ which roughly translates to ‘nothing of note to see’ which explains the simple north/south route for traffic through the village.

Castle was the home of the Percy family, Dukes of Northumberland. There are extensive Tudor brick remains on the visible mound and the moat also remains. Among those born there was William Percy (1428–1462), Bishop of Carlisle. John Leland (16th century) described Leconfield Castle as a large house enclosed by a moat and a large attractive park; three quarters of the house was built of timber, the rest of brick and stone.

In 1823, Leconfield (then spelt 'Leckonfield') was a civil parish in the Wapentake of Harthill. The parish church was under the patronage of George Wyndham, 3rd Earl of Egremont. A medieval Lord of the manor had been Peter de Brus, Lord of Skelton. The population in 1823 was 302, and the occupations included ten farmers, one of whom was the landlord of The Roebuck public house, a bricklayer, a shopkeeper, a carpenter, a blacksmith, and butcher, and the landlady of The Bay Horse public house.

== Community ==
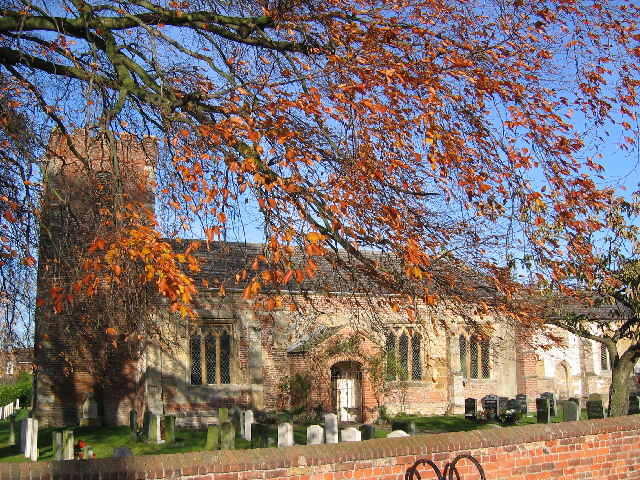
Church of Saint Catherine, Leconfield.

Leconfield was home to RAF Leconfield until 1977, when the RAF withdrew and the Army School of Mechanical Transport (now the Defence School of Transport) took over the site. However, until 2015, Leconfield was used by the RAF as an airfield for their Sea King helicopters of 202 Squadron.

St Catherine's Church, Leconfield was designated a Grade I listed building in 1968. It features in the National Heritage List for England maintained by Historic England.

The village used to contain a post office, which shut in 2022. Leconfield Recreation Club, with a football pitch, is located in Miles Lane.

== See also ==
- Listed buildings in Leconfield

== Climate ==
Climate data for DST Leconfield (1991–2020 normals)
Month	Jan	Feb	Mar	Apr	May	Jun	Jul	Aug	Sep	Oct	Nov	Dec	Year
Mean daily maximum °C (°F)	7.2 (45.0)	8.1 (46.6)	10.3 (50.5)	13.0 (55.4)	15.8 (60.4)	18.8 (65.8)	21.3 (70.3)	21.1 (70.0)	18.3 (64.9)	14.2 (57.6)	10.2 (50.4)	7.5 (45.5)	13.8 (56.8)
Mean daily minimum °C (°F)	1.6 (34.9)	1.6 (34.9)	2.8 (37.0)	4.2 (39.6)	6.8 (44.2)	9.7 (49.5)	11.8 (53.2)	11.9 (53.4)	10.0 (50.0)	7.4 (45.3)	4.2 (39.6)	1.9 (35.4)	6.2 (43.2)
Average rainfall mm (inches)	53.1 (2.09)	49.5 (1.95)	42.9 (1.69)	45.3 (1.78)	44.5 (1.75)	64.3 (2.53)	54.7 (2.15)	61.5 (2.42)	58.2 (2.29)	64.7 (2.55)	64.7 (2.55)	57.7 (2.27)	660.9 (26.02)
Average rainy days (≥ 1 mm)	11.9	10.6	9.4	9.4	9.0	9.9	9.4	9.9	9.4	11.0	12.5	11.5	124.0
Mean monthly sunshine hours	62.1	86.9	124.3	161.7	204.2	175.1	195.6	181.2	144.2	107.3	72.4	59.9	1,575
Source: Met Office
