= Innsworth =

Village in Gloucestershire, England

Coordinates: 51.88738°N 2.20482°W

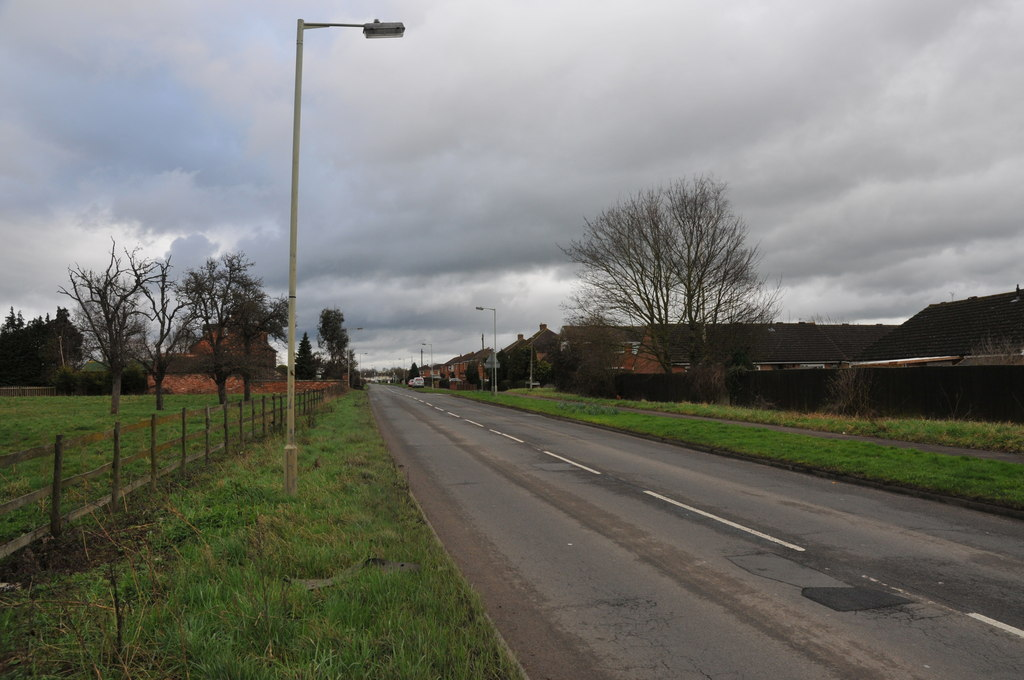
- Innsworth Lane

- Location within Gloucestershire
- Population: 2,468 (2011 census)
- Civil parish: Innsworth
- District: Tewkesbury
- Shire county: Gloucestershire
- Region: South West
- Country: England
- Sovereign state: United Kingdom

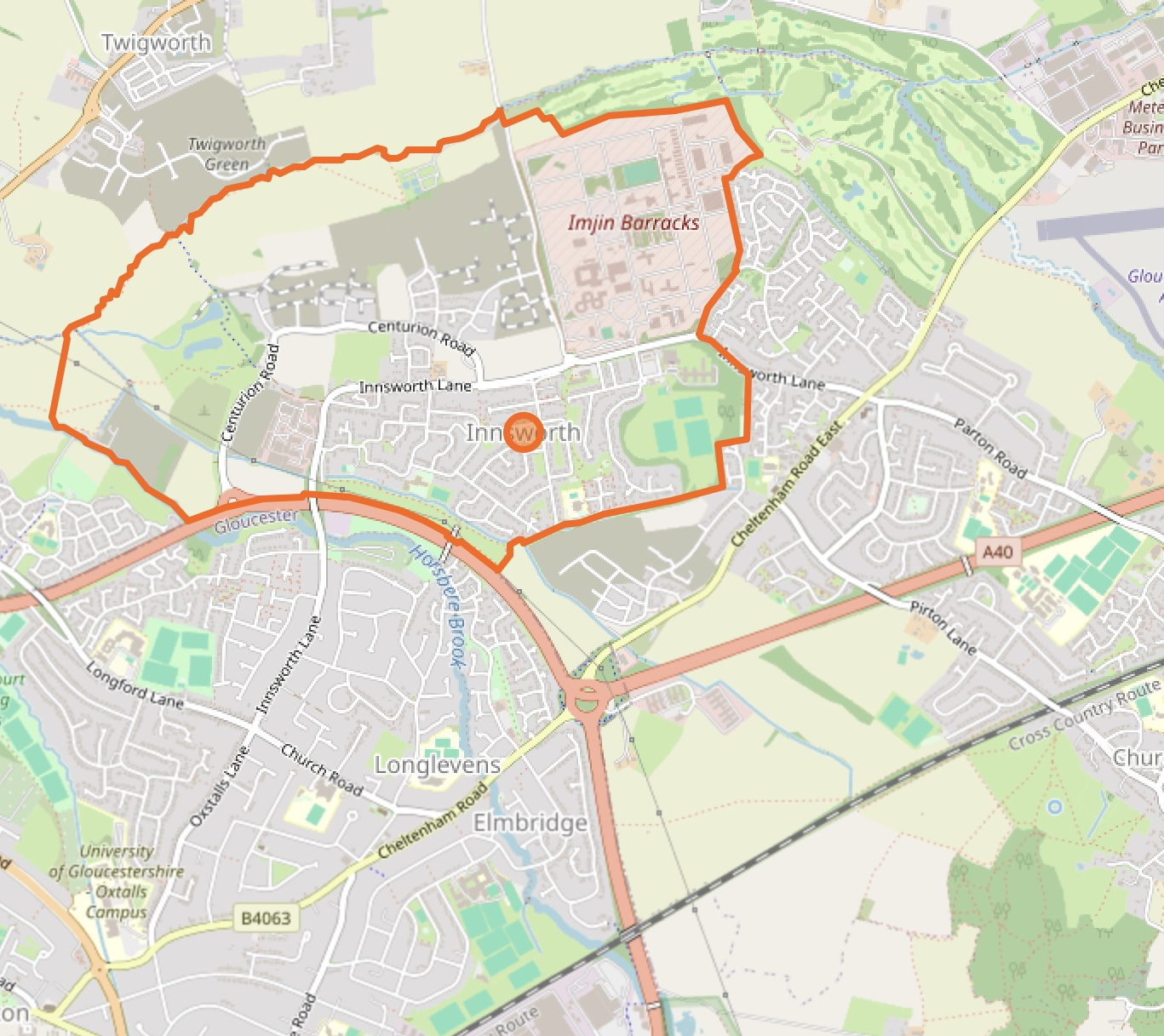
Map of Innsworth, Longlevens to the south, Churchdown to the east.

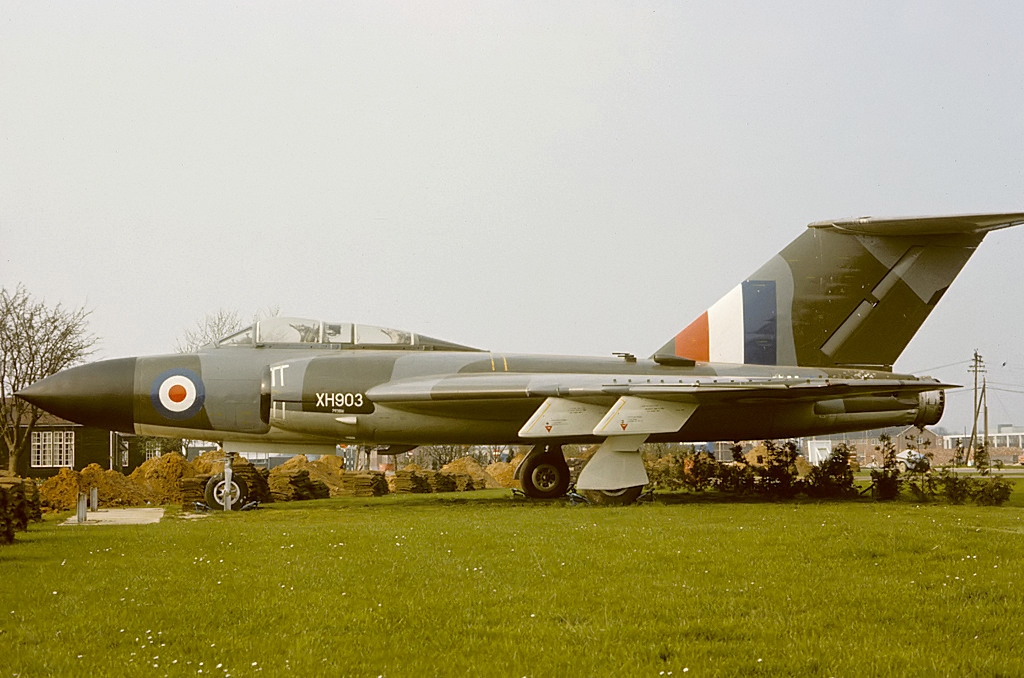
The Gloster Javelin that was once the gatekeeper to RAF Innsworth

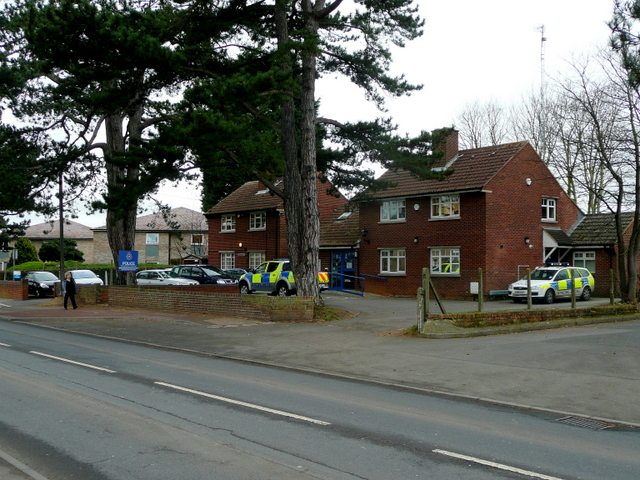
Churchdown and Innsworth police station

Innsworth is a village near Gloucester, and a civil parish in the borough of Tewkesbury, in the county of Gloucestershire, England. The parish population taken at the 2011 census was 2,468, making it the largest community within the Gloucester and Cheltenham Green Belt.

It contains Imjin Barracks, the home of Allied Rapid Reaction Corps, which moved from Germany in 2010. Until 2008, it was best known for RAF Innsworth, the home of the RAF Personnel and Training Command, before its move to RAF High Wycombe to co-locate with RAF Strike Command, forming RAF Air Command.

Innsworth like its neighbouring village, Churchdown, is split into two halves: the military housing side which ends at the junction of Ward Avenue and Swallow Crescent and also Thompson Way again with Swallow Crescent.

== History ==
Many of the housing association homes in Innsworth were either prefabricated, or rapidly built "no fines" structures, as was common in the mid- to late-1940s after the Second World War. The former were only intended to remain standing for two decades, they have now been up for close to 70 years. The majority have had the original prefabricated concrete removed and been refaced with two modern brick walls, some of the distinctive Wimpey and prefab houses still remain. Also in common with many developments at this time, these houses and bungalows are all on roads named according to a theme, in this case they are after birds. New housing developments in the village have followed the tradition with Tern Court at the north of Rookery Road and also Falcon Close 100 yards down the Rookery Road.

Innsworth also used to be home to a local pub called The Bullfinch, known locally as "The Bully". The Bully was closed in late 2004 and knocked down in 2010/2011, to be replaced with social housing by the Severn Vale Housing Society. The old sign for the pub can still be found at the top of Bullfinch Way and its junction with Innsworth Lane.

== Governance ==
Following the Tewkesbury (Electoral Changes) Order 2018 the village falls in the 'Innsworth' electoral ward. This ward stretches between Twigworth, Innsworth and Longford. Two councillors represent the ward.

In 2016, 3110 electors lived in the Innsworth ward. This is expected to grow to 3885 by 2022.

A civil parish called Longlevens was formed on 1 April 1935 from the parishes of Wotton St. Mary Without, Barnwood, Hucclecote and Churchdown. On 14 September 1967 the parish was renamed to "Innsworth".

== Community Hall ==
The village now has its own Community Hall on Rookery Road next to the Junior School. The village campaigned for many years to the local H/A and Borough Council for the Hall. The Hall is available for hire by residents and community groups and operated by local sports charity Sportily.
