= Allied Rapid Reaction Corps =

Rapid reaction force maintained by NATO

Coordinates: 51°10′35″N 6°19′18″E

- Active: 1 October 1992–present
- Country: United Kingdom and 21 other nations
- Branch: British Army and 22 others
- Type: High Readiness Force (Land) HQ; NATO Response Force Land Component Command (2017); NATO Response Force Land Component Command (Jan-Jul 2024); NATO Strategic Reserve Corps Land Component Command (July 2024)
- Size: 400+ staff
- Part of: SHAPE
- Garrison/HQ: Imjin Barracks, Innsworth
- Mottos: Audentis fortuna iuvat Fortune favours the brave

Commanders
- Current commander: Lieutenant General Michael Elviss (British Army)
- Deputy Commander: Major General Massimiliano Quarto (Italian Army)
- Chief of Staff: Major General Mike Keating, CBE (British Army)

The Allied Rapid Reaction Corps (ARRC) is a rapid reaction force maintained by NATO. It is capable of deploying a High Readiness Force (Land) Headquarters at short notice for operations and crisis response.

== History ==
The ARRC was created on 1 October 1992 in Bielefeld based on the former I (British) Corps (I (BR) Corps). It was originally created as the rapid reaction corps sized land force of the Reaction Forces Concept that emerged after the end of the Cold War, with a mission to redeploy and reinforce within Allied Command Europe (ACE) and to conduct Petersberg missions out of NATO territory. The first commander, appointed in 1992 was General Sir Jeremy Mackenzie.

From 1994 the ARRC was based in the Rheindahlen Military Complex, Germany. It commanded the Land Forces of NATO's first ever deployment as part of the Implementation Force operation in Bosnia in 1995/6 and was again deployed as the headquarters commanding Land Forces during the Kosovo War in 1999.

In 1997 assigned forces included the 7th Panzer Division; 2nd Greek Mechanised Division; 1st Turkish Mechanised Division (9th Armoured and 28th Mechanised Brigades, plus a third brigade, as assigned); 1st Armored Division; plus other formations, including the 1st and 3rd Divisions, British Army.

Since 2002 however the headquarters has been re-roled (with five other corps HQs of other NATO nations) as a High Readiness Force (Land) HQ (HRF(L)) with a broader mission. The formation HQ is under Operational Command of Supreme Allied Commander, Europe (SACEUR). The ARRC has a national Force Pool of Combat, Combat Support and Combat Service Support units with which to train and execute its mission. However, in reality COMARRC commands no forces until he receives an Activation Order from SACEUR. On receipt of ACTORD, forces from troop contributing nations, generated through the NATO Force Generation process are passed into his Operational Command for the duration of the operational deployment.

ARRC took command of the International Security Assistance Force in Afghanistan on 4 May 2006 and then relocated from Rheindahlen to Imjin Barracks, outside Gloucester in England, in 2010 before deploying to support the ISAF Joint Command Headquarters in Afghanistan in 2011.

ARRC is also regionally aligned with the European region as part of defence engagement.

In 2017 the ARRC was tasked with responsibility for the land component of the NATO Response Force (NRF) and played an integral part in one of NATO's capstone exercises, Exercise NOBLE JUMP 2017. The ARRC relinquished it responsibilities as the land component of the NRF on 10 January 2018 to NATO Rapid Deployable Corps - Italy.

In October 2019, the Italian Division "Acqui", the Danish Division, the 1st Canadian Division, the 3rd (United Kingdom) Division, and the U.S. 4th Infantry Division were assigned to form part of the ARRC if the corps were to be deployed.

In 2021, the United Kingdom's 104 Theatre Sustainment Brigade was transferred under direct control of HQ ARRC. The United Kingdom's 1st Signal Brigade joined by October 2021.

In 2024, 7th Air Defence Group and 8th Engineer Brigade of the British Army were resubordinated to the ARRC. The 1st Aviation Brigade Combat Team was also given a new warfighting role to directly support HQ ARRC.

== Structure ==
The structure of the ARRC is as follows:

- Commander (UK),
- Deputy Commander (Italy),
- Chief of Staff (UK),
  - Engineers and Civil Military Integration (UK),
  - Training and Security Force Assistance (UK),
  - Joint Fires and Influence Branch (UK),
  - Operations Division (USA),
  - Personnel and Logistics (UK),
  - Command Information Systems (UK),
  - Support Division (Spain).
- 1st Signal Brigade, at Imjin Barracks, Gloucestershire
- 104 Theatre Sustainment Brigade, at Duke of Gloucester Barracks, South Cerney.
- 7th Air Defence Group, at Baker Barracks, Thorney Island.
- 8th Engineer Brigade, at Gibraltar Barracks, Minley.

The deployable headquarters infrastructure and communications for HQ ARRC is provided by the 1st Signal Brigade.

== Troop contributing countries ==
The ARRC is composed of service members from 21 NATO troop contributing countries:

- Albania
- Canada
- Croatia
- Czech Republic
- Denmark
- Estonia
- Finland
- France
- Germany
- Greece
- Italy
- Latvia
- Lithuania
- Netherlands
- Poland
- Portugal
- Romania
- Spain
- Turkey
- United Kingdom (HQ ARRC's framework country)
- United States of America

== Commanders ==
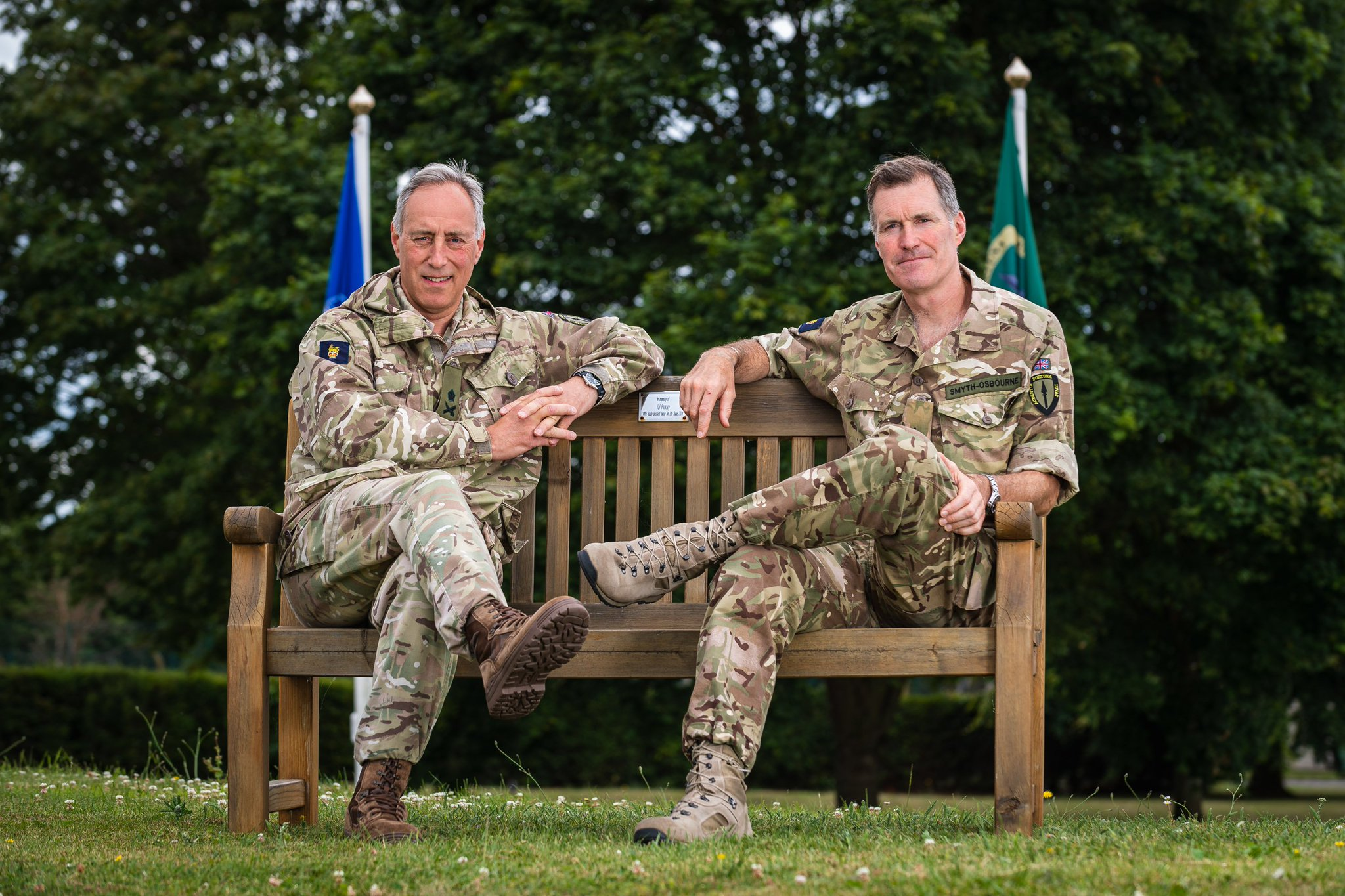
Lt Gen Radford (left) and Lt Gen Smyth-Osbourne

Commanders have included:

- 1992–1994: Lieutenant General Jeremy Mackenzie
- 1994–1997: Lieutenant General Michael Walker
- 1997–2000: Lieutenant General Mike Jackson
- 2000–2002: Lieutenant General Christopher Drewry
- 2002–2005: Lieutenant General Richard Dannatt
- 2005–2007: Lieutenant General David Richards
- 2007–2011: Lieutenant General Sir Richard Shirreff
- 2011–2013: Lieutenant General Sir James Bucknall
- 2013–2016: Lieutenant General Timothy Evans
- 2016–2019: Lieutenant General Timothy Radford
- 2019–2021: Lieutenant General Sir Edward Smyth-Osbourne
- 2021–2024: Lieutenant General Sir Nicholas Borton
- 2024–2026: Lieutenant General Sir Ralph Wooddisse
- 2026–Present: Lieutenant General Michael Elviss
