= 165 Port and Maritime Regiment RLC =

- Active: 1995-present
- Country: United Kingdom
- Branch: British Army
- Role: Logistics
- Size: Regiment; 591 personnel
- Part of: Royal Logistic Corps
- Website: 165 Regiment RLC

165 Port and Maritime Regiment RLC is an Army Reserve regiment of the British Army's Royal Logistic Corps.

== History ==
The regiment was formed in Grantham as 165 Port Regiment, RLC (Volunteers) in 1995. 266 Squadron was re-formed at Southampton in 2006.

In July 2025 former SAS soldier, Phil Campion joined 266 as honorary Squadron Sergeant Major.

== Structure ==
The current structure is as follows:

- Regimental Headquarters, in Derriford, Plymouth
- 142 (Queen's Own Oxfordshire Hussars) Vehicle Squadron RLC - Banbury
- 232 (Cornwall) Port Squadron RLC - Bodmin
- 264 (Plymouth) Headquarters Squadron RLC - Plymouth (Derriford Army Reserve Centre)
- 265 (Devon) Port Squadron RLC - Plymouth (Derriford Army Reserve Centre)
- 266 (Southampton) Port Squadron RLC - Southampton (Blighmont Army Reserve Centre) and Isle of Wight (Newport Army Reserve Centre)
- 710 (Royal Buckinghamshire Hussars) Operational Hygiene Squadron - Aylesbury
