= Imjin Barracks =

Military installation near Innsworth, Gloucestershire, England

- Innsworth
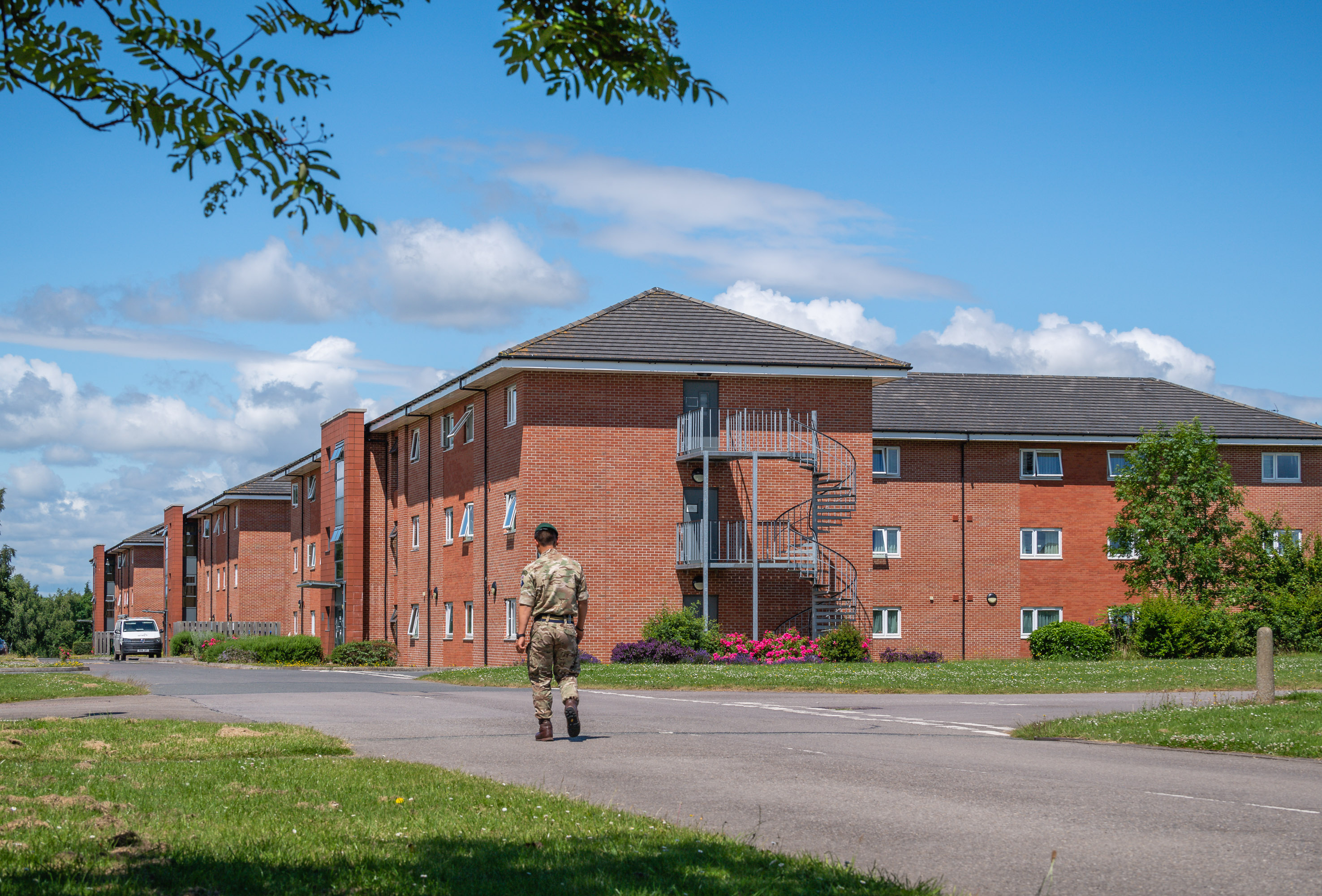
- Accommodation block at Imjin Barracks

Site information
- Type: Barracks; Headquarters
- Owner: Ministry of Defence
- Operator: British Army

Location
- Location within Gloucestershire
- Coordinates: 51°53′35″N 2°11′50″W

Site history
- Built: 1940
- In use: 1940–present

Garrison information
- Occupants: HQ Allied Rapid Reaction Corps; HQ 1st (UK) Signal Brigade; Gurkha ARRC Support Battalion

Imjin Barracks is a British Army installation situated near Innsworth in Gloucestershire, that is home to the headquarters of NATO's Allied Rapid Reaction Corps (ARRC).

== History ==
Imjin Barracks is located at the site of the former RAF Innsworth, which was a non-flying Royal Air Force station between 1940 and 2008.

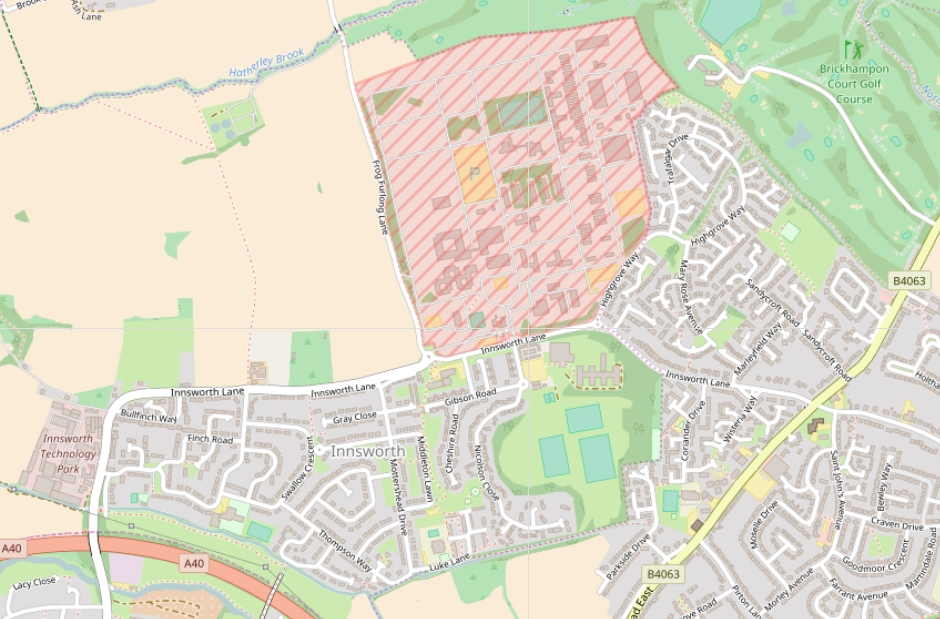
Imjin Barracks (shaded) within Innsworth.

The station opened in 1940, the first unit based there being No 7 School of Technical Training, which trained engine and airframe fitters and mechanics. In December 1941, No 2 WAAF Depot was opened at Innsworth and from then on the station became increasingly associated with the women's branch of the service. Eventually it was decided to reserve the station almost exclusively for WAAF training, including barrage balloon training amongst other vital roles.

In 1951, the headquarters of the RAF Record Office which had been based nearby in Gloucester and Barnwood, moved to the station and gained Group status. Three years later, in 1954, No. 5 Personnel Despatch Unit arrived, charged with the administration and processing of personnel selected for overseas service.

Just after the war ended, the RAF Base Accounts Office moved from York to Gloucester and grew into the Central Pay Office and became part of the RAF Personnel and Training Command, which formed in 1994, based at Innsworth.

In 2005 it was announced that HQ Personnel and Training Command was to co-locate with HQ RAF Strike Command at RAF High Wycombe. The new collocated HQs were subsequently merged to form Air Command and the decision was taken to close RAF Innsworth. The drawdown took place over the next three years with elements of the Personnel Management Agency moved to High Wycombe and RAF Cranwell. RAF Innsworth finally closed on 31 March 2008.

== Army control ==
The Innsworth site is now managed by the Army and has been renamed Imjin Barracks. When the RAF vacated the site in 2008, elements of AFPAA (renamed Defence Business Services in 2014) including the MoD Medal Office and Joint Casualty and Compassionate Centre continued to operate from the site.

In 2010, the barracks also became home to the NATO Allied Rapid Reaction Corps (ARRC), a 3-star headquarters with more than 400 permanent staff from 21 contributing nations, which relocated from the Rheindahlen Military Complex in Germany.

The barracks were named after the Battle of the Imjin River because of the connection with the Gloucestershire Regiment, which formed part of the United Nations contingent in the Korean War, and was thought to be an appropriate name for the headquarters of ARRC, which is a multinational force.

== Based units ==
The following units are based at Imjin Barracks.

=== British Army ===
Allied Rapid Reaction Corps

- 1st (UK) Signal Brigade
  - Headquarters, 1st (UK) Signal Brigade
  - Gurkha ARRC Support Battalion

Royal Corps of Signals

- 22 Signal Regiment
  - 252 Signal Squadron

=== Ministry of Defence ===
Defence Business Services

- MOD Medal Office
- Joint Casualty and Compassionate Centre Commemorations Team

=== NATO ===
Supreme Headquarters Allied Powers Europe

- Allied Rapid Reaction Corps
  - Headquarters, Allied Rapid Reaction Corps
