= 162 Regiment RLC =

Regiment of the Royal Logistic Corps of the British Army

- Active: 1967-present
- Country: United Kingdom
- Branch: British Army
- Role: Logistics
- Size: Regiment; 574 personnel
- Part of: Royal Logistic Corps
- Website: 162 Regiment RLC

162 Regiment RLC is an Army Reserve regiment of the British Army's Royal Logistic Corps.

== History ==
The regiment was formed in the Royal Corps of Transport as 162nd Movement Control Regiment, RCT (Volunteers) in 1967. It absorbed 88 Postal and Courier Regiment RLC and was re-named as 162 Regiment RLC in 2013.

== Structure ==
The current structure is as follows:

- 279 Headquarters Squadron at Nottingham
- 280 Movement Control Squadron at Swindon
- 281 Movement Control Squadron at Nottingham
- 282 Movement Control Squadron at Middlesbrough
