= Land Forces Command (United Kingdom) =

British Army field command

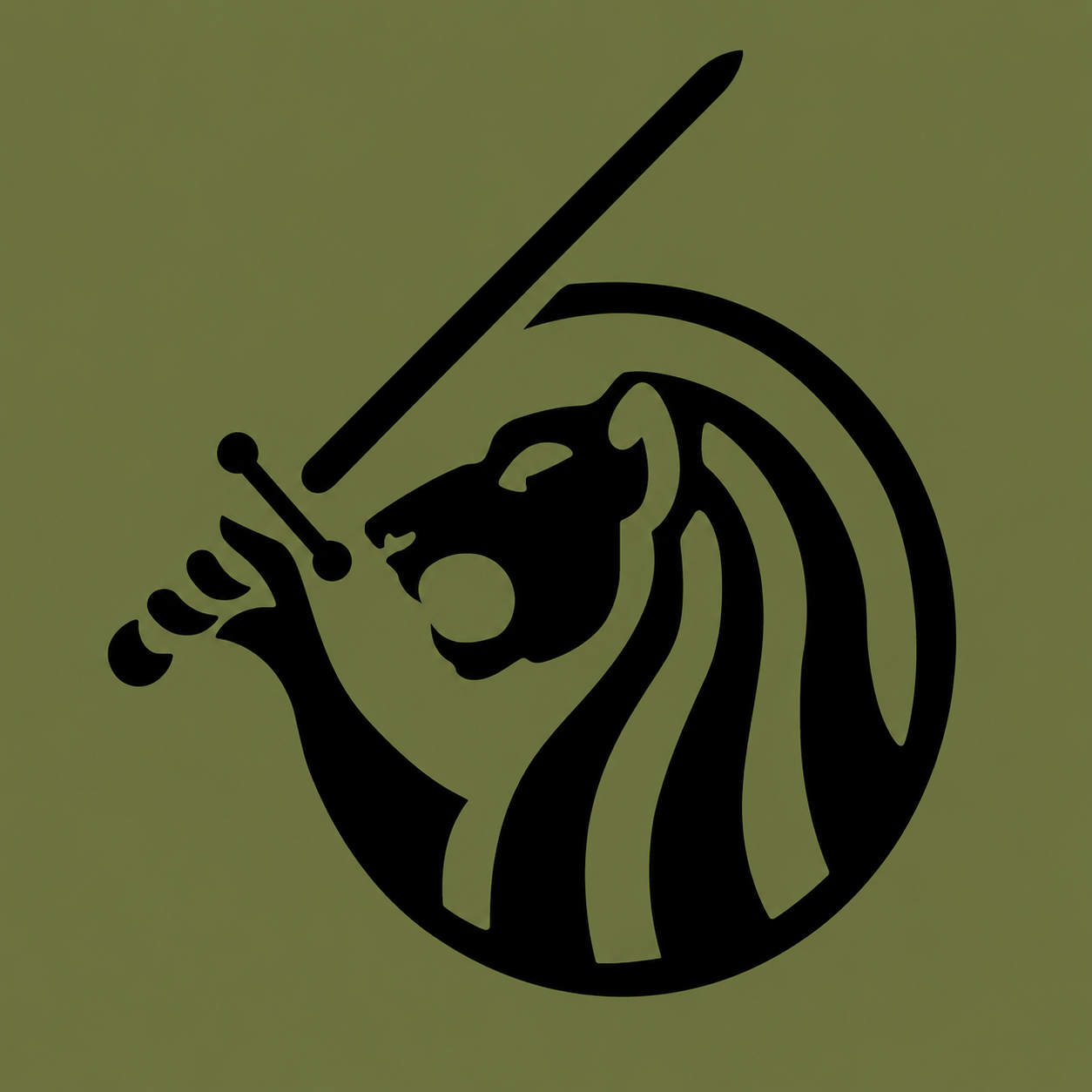
- Tactical Recognition Flash of Field Army
- Active: September 2003 – present
- Country: United Kingdom
- Branch: British Army
- Role: Responsible for "generating and preparing forces for current and contingency operations".
- Part of: Army Headquarters
- Garrison/HQ: Trenchard Lines, Upavon

Commanders
- Commander: Lt Gen Zac Stenning

The Land Forces Command (previously called Field Army until March 2026) is a command of the British Army responsible for generating and preparing forces for current and contingency operations. Commander Land Forces reports to the Chief of the General Staff.

== Background ==
Following the 1966 Defence White Paper, United Kingdom Land Forces was formed, and the post of Deputy Commander-in-Chief, UK Land Forces was created, with the holder having the rank of Lieutenant General. In 1982, as a result of the 1981 Defence White Paper, this post was redesignated as Commander, United Kingdom Field Army, typically shortened to just 'Commander Field Army'. Commander Field Army oversaw corps directors such as Commander, Royal Corps of Signals or Commander, Transport and Movements (Royal Corps of Transport).

United Kingdom Field Army was headquartered at Erskine Barracks in Wilton and responsible for organising home defence forces. The UK Field Army was described by senior officers as "roughly the home equivalent of the British Corps in West Germany", but its commander told Beevor that it was 'not a coherent organisation'. UK Field Army was responsible for all out-of-area operations, training, and home administration. By 1991, the United Kingdom Field Army presided over nearly 40,000 regular soldiers, just over 70,000 members of the Territorial Army (TA), and 6,000 civilians. In addition to the UK Field Army's defence commitments, the Field Army was responsible for aid to the civil authority.

The post was disestablished in 1995 following the Options for Change defence review.

Land Command was later divided in 2003, under the LANDmark reorganisation, into two suborganisations, Field Army and Regional Forces, that paralleled the Cold War structure of UKLF. Commander Field Army had two deployable divisions (1st Armoured Division, 3rd Mechanised Division), Theatre Troops, Joint Helicopter Command, and Training Support under him. In 2007 it was announced that a new deployable divisional HQ would be established until at least 2011, as a means of meeting the UK's commitments to provide divisional HQs on a rotational basis to Regional Command (South) in Afghanistan and as the lead nation of Multi-National Division (South-East) in Iraq. This was based in York and formed around the re-established 6th Division.

=== Field Army ===
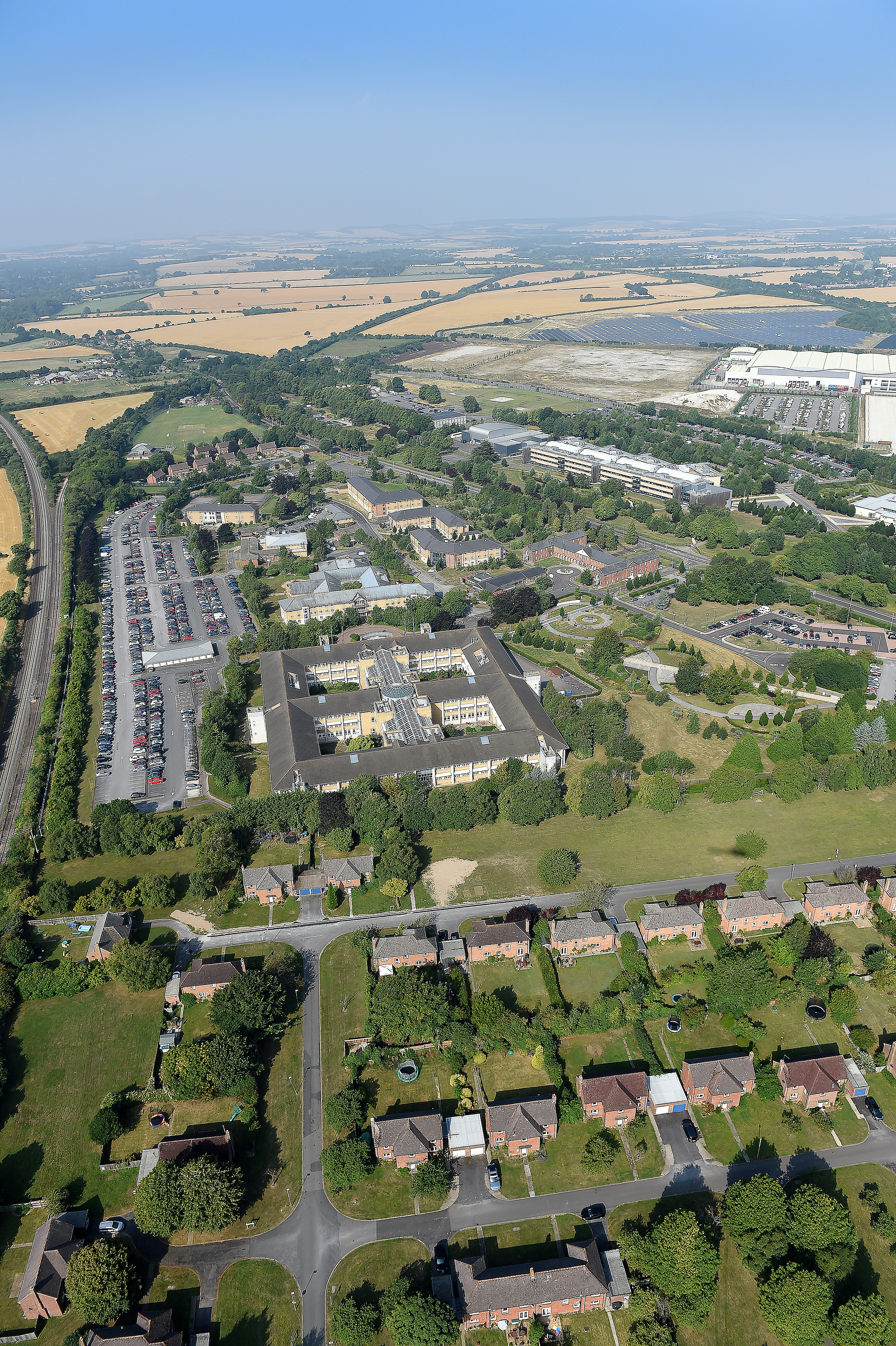
Marlborough Lines, Andover

Under another reorganisation effective from 1 November 2011 the Chief of the General Staff took direct command of the Army through a new structure, based at Andover, known as "Army Headquarters". The post of Commander-in-Chief, Land Forces ceased to exist. In its place a new post of Commander, Land Forces was created, to be held by a lieutenant general (three-star rank).

Following the Strategic Defence and Security Review 2010, the government announced significant changes to the structure of the formations under Land Forces that would be implemented from 2010 - 2020:

- Field Army: By 2020, the total withdrawal of British forces stationed in Germany will be complete, and the Army's operational structure will be formed around a total of five multi-role brigades (MRB); these will be taken from the two brigades currently stationed in Germany under 1st Armoured Division, and three of the four in the UK under 3rd Mechanised Division. To ensure costs are kept down, the MOD's proposal will be to station units as close as possible to training areas. In this process, 19 Light Brigade in Northern Ireland was disbanded.
- Regional Forces: While the regional forces elements have been retained at brigade level, with all ten regional brigades remaining as they are, the regional divisional HQs (2nd Division, 4th Division and 5th Division) were replaced with a single 2-star regional headquarters at Aldershot known as Support Command from Spring 2012.

When Personnel Support Command was established in 2015, it was decided that the role of SJC(UK) Commander was to transfer to Commander PSC in Aldershot. In due course PSC became Home Command.

On 23 November 2015, it was announced that the post of Commander Land Forces would be renamed as Commander Field Army as part of the Army Command Review. CFA will have four brigadiers under their command, namely: Assistant Chief of Staff Commitments, Assistant Chief of Staff Support, Assistant Chief of Staff Warfare and Assistant Chief of Staff Training. During the reorganisation, the post of Assistant Chief of Staff (Warfare) was to be held by the Director, Land Warfare Centre.

Land Operations Command was established on 2 September 2019 as a staff branch within Headquarters Field Army in Andover. Through it, Commander Field Army conducts the planning, generation and operational control of all Field Army deployments.

The Land Special Operations Force (LSOF) was established on 1 December 2023. On 13 October 2025, a response to a Freedom of Information request said that the LSOF comprised the Army Special Operations Brigade, the 11th Brigade, and the 77th Brigade, commanded by a major-general.

Field Army Troops, as of December 2024, included the Surveillance Group; the Understand Group; the Cyber and Electro-Magnetic Activities Effects Group; the Land Warfare Centre; Land Special Operations Force; and 11th Brigade.

=== Reversion to Land Forces ===
In March 2026, it was announced that through further reorganisations within the army, Field Army would once again be renamed to Land Forces Command, with the post of Commander Land Forces being revived for Lieutenant-General Zac Stenning.

== List of structures ==
=== End of Cold War (1989) ===
United Kingdom Field Army Structure in 1989
- Headquarters, United Kingdom Field Army, at Erskine Barracks, Wilton
  - Commander, United Kingdom Field Army Lieutenant General Sir David John Ramsbotham GCB CBE
  - Field Army Troops, at Erskine Barracks, Wilton
    - Commander Electronic Warfare Troops, Royal Corps of Signals
      - 30th Signal Regiment, Royal Corps of Signals, at Evans Lines, Blandford Camp
      - 640 Signal Troop (Electronic Warfare), Royal Corps of Signals, at Blandford Camp
      - 657 Signal Troop (Electronic Warfare), Royal Corps of Signals, at Blandford Camp
      - Bowman Military Requirements Team
      - Electronic Warfare Operational Support Unit
    - Intelligence and Security Group (United Kingdom) (V), HQ in Hackney, London [to BAOR]
      - 8 Intelligence Company, Intelligence Corps [1 x section to 19th Infantry Bde and 2nd Division]
      - 9 Security Company, Intelligence Corps (Note: Sections at Colchester Garrison, Taunton, Bulford, Preston, York, and Edinburgh)
      - 20 Security Company, Intelligence Corps (V), at Saint John's Wood Barracks, London
      - 21 Intelligence Company (Imagery Analysis), Intelligence Corps (V), at Ashford House, London
      - 23 Intelligence Company, Intelligence Corps (V), in Edinburgh
      - 24 Intelligence Company, Intelligence Corps (V), at Ashford House, London [to HQ BAOR]
      - Joint Services Interrogation Organisation [Army Element], at Ashford House, London
        - 22 Intelligence Company, Intelligence Corps (V), at Ashford House, London
      - 162 Special Military Intelligence Training Section
      - 163 (Counter-Intelligence) Section
      - Joint Services Intelligence Office (Corps), Intelligence Corps (V), at Ripon Barracks, Bielefeld, West Germany
      - Joint Service Intelligence Office (British Support Forces), Intelligence Corps (V), at Ripon Barracks, Bielefeld, West Germany
    - Parachute Regiment Group (V), at Arnhem Barracks, Aldershot Garrison (to 1st Armoured Division)
      - Group Signal Troop, Royal Corps of Signals (V), at Bruneval Barracks, Aldershot Garrison
      - 4th (Volunteer) Battalion, The Parachute Regiment (V), at Thornbury Barracks, Pudsey (Parachute Infantry)
      - 10th (Volunteer) Battalion, The Parachute Regiment (V), at the Duke of York's Headquarters, London (Parachute Infantry)
      - 15th (Scottish Volunteer) Battalion, The Parachute Regiment (V), at Yorkhill Parade Glasgow (Parachute Infantry)
    - Special Air Service Group (V), at Baker Barracks, Thorney Island
      - 63 (Special Air Service) Signal Squadron, Royal Corps of Signals (V), at Baker Barracks, Thorney Island
      - 21st Special Air Service Regiment (Artists) (V), in Chelsea, London
      - 23rd Special Air Service Regiment (V), in Birmingham
    - Military Works Force, at Chetwynd Barracks, Chilwell [to Engineer Works Organisation, BAOR]
      - 62nd Chief Royal Engineers (Works)
      - 63rd Chief Royal Engineers (Works)
      - 64th Chief Royal Engineers (Works)
      - 65th Chief Royal Engineers (Works) (V), at Gibraltar Barracks, Minley
    - No. 1 Postal and Courier Group, Royal Engineers (V)
      - Headquarters No. 1 Postal and Courier Group, Royal Engineers (V), at Inglis Barracks, Mill Hill
      - Headquarters Squadron
      - 5th Postal and Courier Regiment, Royal Engineers (V)
      - 6th Postal and Courier Regiment, Royal Engineers (V)
      - 7th Postal and Courier Regiment, Royal Engineers (V)
      - 8th Postal and Courier Regiment, Royal Engineers (V)
    - 3rd Transport Group (Lines of Communications), at McMullen Barracks, Marchwood – formed in 1989
      - Headquarters 3rd Transport Group (Lines of Communications)
      - Headquarters, Port Task Force
      - 17th Port and Maritime Regiment, Royal Corps of Transport, at McMullen Barracks, Marchwood
        - 265 Port Squadron (V), at Prince William of Gloucester Barracks, Grantham
      - 20th Maritime Regiment, Royal Corps of Transport, at Saint George's Barracks, Gosport
      - 25 Freight Distribution Squadron, Royal Corps of Transport, at Saint David's Barracks, Bicester Garrison
      - 53 Port Support Squadron, Royal Corps of Transport
      - Headquarters Solent Station
    - 23rd Pioneer Group, at Saint David's Barracks, Bicester Garrison – battalion sized unit
      - 187 (Tancred) Pioneer Company, Royal Pioneer Corps (V), at Tidworth Camp [to Commander Labour Resources, 1st British Corps]
      - 518 Pioneer Company, Royal Pioneer Corps (V), at Bicester Garrison [to Commander Labour Resources, 1st British Corps]
      - 521 Pioneer Company, Royal Pioneer Corps (V), at Vauxhall Barracks, Didcot
    - Logistic Support Group (LSG, 0155), at Butler Barracks, Aldershot Garrison
      - 524 Specialist Team (Works), Royal Engineers, at Chetwynd Barracks, Chilwell [to Logistic Support Group]
      - 27th Transport Regiment, Royal Corps of Transport, at Ward Barracks, Bulford Camp
      - 29th Transport and Movement Regiment, Royal Corps of Transport, at Duke of Gloucester Barracks, South Cerney
      - 1st Aircraft Support Unit, Royal Army Ordnance Corps, at AAC Middle Wallop
      - Joint Helicopter Support Unit (United Kingdom), at RAF Odiham
      - United Kingdom Mobile Force RHU (vehicles from 44 Sqn RCT)
      - 9th Ordnance Battalion, Royal Army Ordnance Corps, at Basil Hill Barracks, Corsham
      - 22nd Field Hospital, Royal Army Medical Corps, at Aldershot Garrison (cadre, becomes 60 Field Psychiatric Team on mob)
      - 85th Field Medical Equipment Depot, Royal Army Medical Corps
      - Logistic Support Group Information and News Sheet Team, Royal Army Educational Corps
    - 2nd Signal Brigade, at Basil Hill Barracks, Corsham
    - 11th Signal Brigade (Volunteers), at Deysbrook Barracks, Liverpool
    - 12th Signal Brigade (Volunteers), at Duke of York's Headquarters, Chelsea
    - 1st Infantry Brigade, at Jellalabad Barracks, Tidworth Camp
    - 5th Airborne Brigade, at Arnhem Barracks, Aldershot Garrison
    - 12th (Air Support) Engineer Brigade, at RAF Waterbeach
    - 30th Engineer Brigade, at Kitchener House, Stafford
  - Headquarters Scotland, at Craighall Camp, Edinburgh
    - General Officer Commanding Scotland Lieutenant General Sir John Richard Alexander MacMillan
    - 242 Signal Squadron (Scotland), Royal Corps of Signals, at Craighall Camp, Edinburgh
    - 410 Transport Troop, Royal Corps of Transport
    - 26th District Workshop, Royal Electrical and Mechanical Engineers, at Forthside Barracks, Stirling
    - 27 Army Education Centre, Royal Army Educational Corps, at Redford Barracks, Edinburgh
    - 51st (Highland) Infantry Brigade, in Perth
    - 52nd (Lowland) Infantry Brigade, at Redford Barracks, Edinburgh
  - North East District, at Imphal Barracks, York
    - 240 Signal Squadron, Royal Corps of Signals, at Imphal Barracks, York
    - 409 Independent Combat Plant Troop, Royal Engineers (V), at Frenchmans Fort, South Shields [to Commander Royal Engineers, 1st British Corps]
    - 416 Independent Combat Artisan Troop, Royal Engineers (V), at Mona House, Sutton-on-Hull [to 211th Mobile Civilian Artisan Group]
    - 40 Transport Squadron, Royal Corps of Transport, at Catterick Garrison
    - 46 Transport Squadron, Royal Corps of Transport, at Imphal Barracks, York (HQ North East District transport sqn)
    - 124 (Tyne Electrical Engineers) Recovery Company, Royal Electrical and Mechanical Engineers (V), in Newton Aycliffe [to Commander Maintenance, Corps Troops, 1st British Corps]
    - 31st District Workshop, Royal Electrical and Mechanical Engineers, at Catterick Garrison
    - 41st District Workshop, Royal Electrical and Mechanical Engineers, at Queen Elizabeth Barracks, Strensall
    - Duchess of Kent's Military Hospital, Catterick, at Catterick Garrison (400 x beds, becomes 34th Evacuation Hospital, RAMC)
    - 2 Army Education Centre, Royal Army Educational Corps, at Imphal Barracks, York
    - 3 Army Education Centre, Royal Army Educational Corps, at Catterick Garrison
    - 146th (North East) Brigade
  - Eastern District, at Colchester Garrison
    - 239 Signal Squadron, Royal Corps of Signals, at Colchester Garrison
    - 48 Transport Squadron, Royal Corps of Transport, at Colchester Garrison (HQ Eastern District transport sqn)
    - 118 Recovery Company, Royal Electrical and Mechanical Engineers (V), in Northampton [to Commander Maintenance, BAOR]
    - 36th District Workshop, Royal Electrical and Mechanical Engineers, at Colchester Garrison
    - Rear Combat Zone Defence Animal Support Unit, Royal Army Veterinary Corps (V), in Melton Mowbray [to Commander RAVC, BAOR]
    - 4 Army Education Centre, Royal Army Educational Corps, at RAF Waterbeach, Waterbeach
    - 18 Army Education Centre, Royal Army Educational Corps, at Goojerat Barracks, Colchester Garrison
    - Central Volunteer Headquarters, Royal Pioneer Corps (V), at Simpson Barracks, Wootton
    - 54th (East Anglian) Infantry Brigade, at Gibraltar Barracks, Bury Saint Edmunds
    - 161st (East Anglian) Infantry Brigade
  - London District, at Horse Guards, Whitehall, London
    - 238 (London) Signal Squadron, Royal Corps of Signals, at Chelsea Barracks, London
    - 101st (London) Engineer Regiment (Explosive Ordnance Disposal), Royal Engineers (V), in Catford [to British Rear Support Command]
    - 151st (Greater London) Transport Regiment, Royal Corps of Transport (V), in Croydon [to Commander Transport, 1st British Corps]
    - 873 Movement Light Squadron, Royal Engineers (V), in Acton [to 29th Engineer Brigade]
    - 20 Transport Squadron, Royal Corps of Transport, at Regent's Park Barracks, London
    - 56 Transport Squadron, Royal Corps of Transport, at Royal Artillery Barracks, Woolwich Garrison
    - 144th Field Ambulance, Royal Army Medical Corps (V), in Chelsea (22 x Land Rover Ambulances) [to Logistic Support Group]
    - 257th (Southern) General Hospital, Royal Army Medical Corps (V), in London (700 x beds) [to Logistic Support Group]
    - Queen Elizabeth Military Hospital, Woolwich, at Woolwich Garrison (becomes 30th General Hospital, RAMC on mobilisation, 800 x beds) [to Commander Medical, RCZ]
    - Band of the Grenadier Guards, at Wellington Barracks, London (Major Staff Band)
    - Band of the Coldstream Guards, at Wellington Barracks, London (Major Staff Band)
    - Band of the Scots Guards, at Wellington Barracks, London (Major Staff Band)
    - Band of the Irish Guards, at Chelsea Barracks, London (Major Staff Band)
    - Band of the Welsh Guards, at Chelsea Barracks, London (Major Staff Band)
    - 24 Army Education Centre, Royal Army Educational Corps, at Victoria Barracks, Windsor
    - 30 Army Education Centre, Royal Army Educational Corps, at Royal Artillery Barracks, Woolwich Garrison
    - 31 Army Education Centre, Royal Army Educational Corps, at Royal Artillery Barracks, Woolwich Garrison
    - 56th (London) Infantry Brigade, at Horse Guards, Whitehall, London
  - South East District, at Aldershot Garrison
    - General Officer Commanding-in-Chief, South East District Lieutenant General Sir Peter Edgar de la Cour de la Billière
    - 251 Signal Squadron, Royal Corps of Signals, at Duchess of Kent Barracks, Aldershot Garrison
    - 56 Signal Squadron, Royal Corps of Signals (V), in Eastbourne and Sandgate [to Commander Communications, BAOR]
    - 135 Independent Topographic Squadron, Royal Engineers (V), in Ewell [to come under 42 Survey Group on mobilisation, but support HQ AFCENT]
    - 41 Transport Squadron, Royal Corps of Transport, at Mons Barracks, Aldershot Garrison
    - 55 Ordnance Company (Ammo), Royal Army Ordnance Corps (V) [to 5th Ordnance Bn, Commander Supply, 1st British Corps]
    - 93 Ordnance Company (V), in Hilsea [to Logistic Support Group]
    - 9th Field Workshop Company, Royal Electrical and Mechanical Engineers (V), in Hilsea [to Logistic Support Group]
    - 133 (Kent) Corps Troops Workshop Company, Royal Electrical and Mechanical Engineers (V), in Maidstone [to Commander Maintenance, Corps Troops, 1st British Corps]
    - 30th District Workshop, Royal Electrical and Mechanical Engineers, at Inglis Barracks, Mill Hill
    - 43rd District Workshop, Royal Electrical and Mechanical Engineers, at Aldershot Garrison
    - 44th District Workshop, Royal Electrical and Mechanical Engineers, at Templer Barracks, Ashford
    - Joint Air Transport Establishment
    - Cambridge British Military Hospital, Aldershot, at Aldershot Garrison (becomes 33rd Field Hospital, RAMC on mobilisation) [to Commander Medical, 1st British Corps]
    - 8 Army Education Centre, Royal Army Educational Corps, at Princess Royal Barracks, Deepcut
    - 9 Army Education Centre, Royal Army Educational Corps, at Prince Philip Barracks, Bordon Camp
    - 15 Army Education Centre, Royal Army Educational Corps, at Bicester Garrison
    - 22 Army Education Centre, Royal Army Educational Corps, at Brompton Barracks, Chatham
    - 77 Army Education Centre, Royal Army Educational Corps, at Saint Omer Barracks, Aldershot Garrison
    - Central Volunteer Headquarters, Royal Engineers, at Gibraltar Barracks, Minley
    - Central Volunteer Headquarters Royal Engineers, Postal and Courier Service, at Inglis Barracks, Mill Hill
    - Headquarters, Royal Army Ordnance Corps Territorial Army, at Blackdown Barracks, Deepcut
    - Headquarters, Royal Electrical and Mechanical Engineers Territorial Army, at Louisbourg Barracks, Bordon
    - 2nd (Southeast) Infantry Brigade, at Shorncliffe Army Camp, Cheriton
    - 145th (Home Counties) Infantry Brigade, at Aldershot Garrison
  - South West District, at Bulford Camp
    - 243 Signal Squadron, Royal Corps of Signals, at Ward Barracks, Bulford Camp
    - Independent Field Troop (Allied Mobile Force Land Support), Royal Engineers [to Allied Mobile Force Land]
    - 2nd Postal and Courier Regiment, Royal Engineers, at Duke of Gloucester Barracks, South Cerney
    - Allied Mobile Force Land Logistic Support Battalion, Royal Corps of Transport [to Allied Mobile Force Land]
    - 222 Transport Squadron, Royal Corps of Transport, at Bulford Camp (HQ South West District transport sqn)
    - 66 Transport Squadron, Royal Corps of Transport, at Jellalabad Barracks, Tidworth Camp
    - Junior Leaders Regiment, Royal Corps of Transport/Royal Army Ordnance Corps, at Azimghur Barracks, Colerne
    - 27th District Workshop, Royal Electrical and Mechanical Engineers, at Battlesbury Barracks, Warminster [to Allied Mobile Force Land]
    - 609 Tactical Air Control Party, Army Air Corps (RAF Officer manned) [to Allied Mobile Force Land]
    - No. 2 Flight, Army Air Corps, at AAC Netheravon (under admin of 7 Regiment AAC, 6 x Gazelles) [to Allied Mobile Force Land]
    - Defence Medical Equipment Depot, British Army of the Rhine, in Ludgershall (TTW to 4th Garrison Area, becomes 82nd Field Medical Equipment Depot, RAMC) [to Commander Medical, RCZ]
    - 6 Army Education Centre, Royal Army Educational Corps, at Battlesbury Barracks, Warminster
    - 7 Army Education Centre, Royal Army Educational Corps, at Beachley Barracks, Chepstow
    - 10 Army Education Centre, Royal Army Educational Corps, at Candahar Barracks, Tidworth Camp
    - 12 Army Education Centre, Royal Army Educational Corps, at Stirling Barracks, Larkhill Garrison
    - 78 Army Education Centre, Royal Army Educational Corps, at Jellalabad Barracks, Tidworth Camp
    - 43rd (Wessex) Infantry Brigade, at Wyvern Barracks, Exeter
  - Wales District, at The Barracks, Brecon
    - 414 Combat Artisan Troop, Royal Engineers (V), at Monmouth Castle, Monmouth (to 217th Mobile Civilian Engineer Group, Commander Royal Engineers, BAOR)
    - 119 (Holywell) Recovery Company, Royal Electrical and Mechanical Engineers (V), in Prestatyn [to Logistic Support Group]
    - 39th District Workshop, Royal Electrical and Mechanical Engineers, in Bridgend
    - 160th (Wales) Infantry Brigade, at The Barracks, Brecon
  - Western District, at Copthorne Barracks, Shrewsbury
    - 241 Signal Squadron, Royal Corps of Signals, at Parsons Barracks, Donnington
    - 413 Combat Artisan Troop, Royal Engineers (V), at Kitchener House, Stafford (to 232nd Mobile Civilian Engineer Group, Commander Royal Engineers, BAOR)
    - 126 Reclamation Company, Royal Electrical and Mechanical Engineers (V), in Coventry [to Commander Maintenance, Corps Troops, 1st British Corps]
    - 20 Army Education Centre, Royal Army Educational Corps, at Gamecock Barracks, Bramcote
    - 143rd (West Midlands) Infantry Brigade, at Copthorne Barracks, Shrewsbury
  - North West District, at Fulwood Barracks, Preston
    - 55 (Merseyside) Signal Squadron, Royal Corps of Signals (V), at Aintree Barracks, Liverpool
    - 411 Independent Combat Plant Troop, Royal Engineers (V), at Gordon House, Walsall (to Commander Engineers, BAOR)
    - 415 Combat Artisan Troop, Royal Engineers (V), in Failsworth, Oldham (to 221st Mobile Civilian Artisan Group, Commander Engineers, BAOR)
    - 320 Transport Squadron, Royal Corps of Transport (V) (Home Service Force)
    - 42nd District Workshop, Royal Electrical and Mechanical Engineers, in Liverpool
    - 1 Army Education Centre, Royal Army Educational Corps, at Fulwood Barracks, Preston
    - 42nd (North West) Brigade, at Chester Castle, Chester

=== Future Army Structure (2008) ===
Future Army Structure (2008)
The structure of the Field Army by late 2008 was as follows:
- Headquarters, Land Forces, at Erskine Barracks, Wilton
  - Land Forces Troops
    - Director General Training Support – a Major General responsible for "operational military training and overseeing the training areas"
      - Land Accident Prevention and Investigation Team (LAIT)
    - Commander Land Support (Land Support Management Group) – formerly Commander Logistical Support – responsible for the management of the Defence Supply Chain to deployed forces, storage, transportation, distribution, of all the necessities for operations and living
    - Media Operations Group (Volunteers), in Kingston upon Thames – providing media support to HQ Land Forces
    - 16th Air Assault Brigade, HQ at Merville Barracks, Colchester Garrison
  - 1st (United Kingdom) Armoured Division, HQ in Herford, Germany
    - 7th Armoured Brigade, HQ at Bergen-Hohne Garrison
    - 20th Armoured Brigade, HQ at Paderborn Garrison
    - United Kingdom Support Command (Germany)
  - 3rd (United Kingdom) Mechanised Division, HQ at Bulford Camp
    - 1st Mechanised Brigade, HQ at Tidworth Camp
    - 4th Mechanised Brigade, HQ at Catterick Garrison
    - 12th Mechanised Brigade, HQ at Aldershot Garrison
    - 19th Light Brigade, HQ at Thiepval Barracks, Lisburn
    - 52nd Infantry Brigade, HQ at Dreghorn Barracks, Edinburgh
  - 6th Division, HQ at Imphal Barracks, York
  - Theatre Troops, at Airfield Camp, Netheravon
    - 1st (United Kingdom) Signal Brigade, HQ at Joint Headquarters, Rheindahlen Garrison, Germany
    - 2nd (National Communications) Signal Brigade, HQ at Basil Hill Barracks, Corsham
    - 11th Signal Brigade, HQ at Venning Barracks, Donnington
    - 1st Military Intelligence Brigade, HQ at Airfield Camp, Netheravon
    - 1st Artillery Brigade, HQ at Airfield Camp, Netheravon
    - Joint Ground Based Air Defence Headquarters, HQ at RAF High Wycombe
    - 8th Force Engineer Brigade, HQ at Erskine Barracks, Wilton
      - 12th (Air Support) Engineer Group, HQ at Waterbeach Barracks, Waterbeach
      - 29th (Land Support) Engineer Group, HQ at Aldershot Garrison
      - 170th (Infrastructure Support) Engineer Group, HQ at Chetwynd Barracks, Chilwell
    - 101st Logistic Brigade, HQ at Buller Barracks, Aldershot Garrison
    - 102nd Logistic Brigade, HQ at Princess Royal Barracks, Gütersloh Garrison
    - 104th Logistic Support Brigade, HQ at Airfield Camp, Netheravon
    - Headquarters Royal Logistic Corps, Territorial Army, at Prince William of Gloucester Barracks, Grantham
    - Equipment Support, Theatre Troops
    - 2nd Medical Brigade, HQ at Queen Elizabeth Barracks, Strensall
  - Joint Helicopter Command, at Erskine barracks, Wilton
    - 21st Signal Regiment (Air Support), Royal Corps of Signals, at Azimghur Barracks, Colerne (Territorial Army; supporting RAF Support Helicopter Force)
      - 43 (Wessex) Signal Squadron (V), in Bath and Exeter
    - Joint Helicopter Support Squadron, at RAF Benson
    - 5th Regiment, Army Air Corps, at RAF Aldergrove
    - 6th (Volunteer) Regiment, Army Air Corps (V), HQ at Blenheim Camp, Bury Saint Edmunds (Aviation Ground Support)
    - 7th (Volunteer) Regiment, Army Air Corps (V), HQ at AAC Netheravon, Netheravon
    - Central Volunteer Headquarters, Army Air Corps, at AAC Middle Wallop

=== Army 2020 (2015) ===
Army 2020 Structure (2015)

The structure of the Field Army after the Army 2020 reform was as follows by 2015:

- Headquarters, Field Army, at Trenchard Lines, Upavon
  - 16th Air Assault Brigade, HQ at Merville Barracks, Colchester Garrison
  - 1st (United Kingdom) Division, HQ at Imphal Barracks, York – 'Adaptable Force'
    - 4th Infantry Brigade & Headquarters North East, HQ at Bourlon Barracks, Catterick Garrison
    - 7th Infantry Brigade & Headquarters East, HQ at Chetwynd Barracks, Chilwell
    - 11th Infantry Brigade & Headquarters South East, HQ at Aldershot Garrison
    - 38th (Irish) Brigade, HQ at Thiepval Barracks, Lisburn
    - 42nd Infantry Brigade & Headquarters North West, HQ at Fulwood Barracks, Preston
    - 51st Infantry Brigade & Headquarters Scotland, HQ at Forthside Barracks, Stirling
    - 160th Infantry Brigade & Headquarters Wales, HQ at The Barracks, Brecon
    - 102nd Logistic Brigade, HQ at Prince William of Gloucester Barracks, South Cerney
  - 3rd (United Kingdom) Division, HQ at Bulford Camp
    - 1st Armoured Infantry Brigade, HQ at Tidworth Camp
    - 12th Armoured Infantry Brigade, HQ at Bulford Camp
    - 20th Armoured Infantry Brigade, HQ at Antwerp Barracks, Westfalen Garrison, Germany
    - 101st Logistic Brigade, HQ at Saint Omer Barracks, Aldershot Garrison
  - Force Troops Command, at Trenchard Lines, Upavon
    - 1st (United Kingdom) Signal Brigade, HQ at Imjin Barracks, Innsworth
    - 11th Signal Brigade & Headquarters West Midlands, HQ at MoD Donnington
    - 1st Intelligence and Surveillance Brigade, HQ at Trenchard Lines, Upavon
    - 77th Brigade, at Denison Barracks, Hermitage
    - 1st Artillery Brigade & Headquarters South West, HQ at Jellalabad Barracks, Tidworth Camp
    - Joint Ground Based Air Defence Headquarters, HQ at RAF High Wycombe
    - 8th Engineer Brigade, HQ at Gibraltar Barracks, Minley
      - 12th (Force Support) Engineer Group, HQ at RAF Wittering
      - 25th (Close Support) Engineer Group, HQ at Gibraltar Barracks, Minley – under command of HQ 3rd (UK) Division on operations
      - 29th (Explosive Ordnance Disposal & Search) Engineer Group, HQ at Aldershot Garrison
      - 170th (Infrastructure Support) Engineer Group, HQ at Chetwynd Barracks, Chilwell
    - 104th Logistic Support Brigade, HQ at Duke of Gloucester Barracks, South Cerney
    - 2nd Medical Brigade, HQ at Queen Elizabeth Barracks, Strensall
    - 1st Military Police Brigade, HQ at Worthy Down Barracks, Winchester Garrison

=== Army 2020 Refine (2021) ===
Army 2020 Refine Structure (2021)

Structure of Field Army after the Army 2020 Refine and 2019 reorganisation of the Field Army:

- Headquarters, Field Army, at Trenchard Lines, Upavon
  - Land Operations Command, at Trenchard Lines, Upavon
  - Land Warfare Centre, HQ at Waterloo Lines, Warminster Garrison
  - 16th Air Assault Brigade, HQ at Merville Barracks, Colchester Garrison
  - Collective Training Group (also Training Branch, Field Army) (Note: The Collective Training Group is a 1-star command (Brigade-sized) which provides collective training for Commander Field Army.), at Warminster Garrison
  - Field Training Unit (Note: The Field Training Unit is a 1-star command (brigade equivalent) which provides training for the Field Army's light and mechanised battlegroups)
  - 1st (United Kingdom) Division, HQ at Imphal Barracks, York – 'Adaptable Force'
    - 4th Infantry Brigade & Headquarters North East, HQ at Bourlon Barracks, Catterick Garrison
    - 7th Infantry Brigade & Headquarters East, HQ at Chetwynd Barracks, Chilwell
    - 11th Infantry Brigade & Headquarters South East, HQ at Aldershot Garrison
    - 51st Infantry Brigade & Headquarters Scotland, HQ at Forthside Barracks, Stirling
    - 8th Engineer Brigade, HQ at Gibraltar Barracks, Minley
      - 12th (Force Support) Engineer Group, HQ at RAF Wittering
      - 29th (Explosive Ordnance Disposal & Search) Engineer Group, HQ at Aldershot Garrison
      - 170th (Infrastructure Support) Engineer Group, HQ at Chetwynd Barracks, Chilwell
    - 102nd Logistic Brigade, HQ at Prince William of Gloucester Barracks, South Cerney
    - 104th Logistic Support Brigade, HQ at Duke of Gloucester Barracks, South Cerney
    - 2nd Medical Brigade, HQ at Queen Elizabeth Barracks, Strensall
    - 1st Military Police Brigade, HQ at Worthy Down Barracks, Winchester Garrison
  - 3rd (United Kingdom) Division, HQ at Bulford Camp
    - 11th Signal Brigade & Headquarters West Midlands, HQ at MoD Donnington
      - 7th Signal Group, HQ at MoD Stafford
    - 1st Armoured Infantry Brigade, HQ at Tidworth Camp
    - 12th Armoured Infantry Brigade, HQ at Bulford Camp
    - 20th Armoured Infantry Brigade, HQ at Antwerp Barracks, Westfalen Garrison, Germany
    - 1st Artillery Brigade, HQ at Jellalabad Barracks, Tidworth Camp
    - 7th Air Defence Group, HQ at Baker Barracks, Thorney Island
    - 25th (Close Support) Engineer Group, HQ at Picton Barracks, Bulford Camp
    - 101st Logistic Brigade, HQ at Saint Omer Barracks, Aldershot Garrison
      - 29th Pre-Hospital Divisional Medical Group, HQ at Bulford Camp
  - 6th (United Kingdom) Division, at Trenchard Lines, Upavon
    - 1st (United Kingdom) Signal Brigade, HQ at Imjin Barracks, Innsworth
    - 1st Intelligence, Surveillance, and Reconnaissance Brigade, HQ at Trenchard Lines, Upavon
    - 77th Brigade, at Denison Barracks, Hermitage
    - Specialised Infantry Group, HQ at Saint Omer Barracks, Aldershot Garrison

=== Future Soldier (2030) ===
Future Soldier Structure (2030)

The structure of the Field Army by 2023 following the 'Future Soldier' programme:

- Headquarters, Land Forces Command, HQ at Trenchard Lines, Upavon
  - Land Forces Troops, at Marlborough Lines, Andover
    - Cyber and Electro Magnetic Activities Effects Group, at Marlborough Lines, Andover
    - Intelligence, Surveillance, and Reconnaissance Group, at Trenchard Lines, Upavon
    - 2nd Medical Group, at Queen Elizabeth Barracks, Strensall
    - Land Warfare Centre, HQ at Waterloo Lines, Warminster Garrison
  - 1st (United Kingdom) Division, HQ at Catterick Garrison
    - 16th Air Assault Brigade, at Merville Barracks, Colchester Garrison
    - 2nd Signal Regiment, Royal Corps of Signals, at Catterick Garrison
    - 37th Signal Regiment, Royal Corps of Signals (Army Reserve), in Redditch – paired with 2 Signal Regiment
    - 1st Military Intelligence Battalion, Intelligence Corps, at Gaza Barracks, Catterick Garrison
    - 5th Military Intelligence Battalion, Intelligence Corps (Army Reserve), in, Edinburgh – paired with 1 MI Bn
    - 4th Light Brigade, at Munster Barracks, Catterick Garrison
    - 7th Light Mechanised Brigade, at Kendrew Barracks, Cottesmore
    - 11th Security Force Assistance Brigade, at Aldershot Garrison
    - 19th Reserve Brigade, at Imphal Barracks, York – home defence and resilience duties
    - 8th Engineer Brigade, at Gibraltar Barracks, Minley
      - 12th (Force Support) Engineer Group, at RAF Wittering, Cambridgeshire
      - 29th (Explosive Ordnance Disposal and Search) Group, at Montgomery House, Aldershot Garrison
    - 102nd Theatre Sustainment Brigade, at Catterick Garrison
  - 3rd (United Kingdom) Division, HQ at Bulford Camp
    - The Royal Wessex Yeomanry (Army Reserve), HQ at Allenby Barracks, Bovington Garrison
    - 4th Military Intelligence Battalion, Intelligence Corps, at Ward Barracks, Bulford Camp
    - 7th Military Intelligence Battalion, Intelligence Corps (Army Reserve), in Bristol – paired with 4 MI Bn
    - 7th Signals Group, HQ at Swinton Barracks, Perham Down
    - 3rd Deep Reconnaissance Strike Brigade, HQ at Tidworth Camp
    - 12th Armoured Brigade, HQ at Bulford Camp
    - 20th Armoured Brigade, HQ at Bulford Camp
    - 7th Air Defence Group, HQ at Baker Barracks, Thorney Island
    - 25th (Close Support) Engineer Group, HQ at Wing Barracks, Bulford Camp
    - 101st Operational Sustainment Brigade, HQ at Saint Omer Barracks, Aldershot Garrison
    - 1st Royal Military Police Group, HQ at Marlborough Lines, Andover
  - 6th (United Kingdom) Division, HQ at Trenchard Lines, Upavon
    - 77th Brigade, HQ at Pirbright Camp
    - Army Special Operations Brigade, HQ at Saint Omer Barracks, Aldershot Garrison
