= Land Command =

Military command and formation

Land Command (or 'HQ Land') was a military command and formation and part of the structure of the British Army from 1995 to 2008. Its headquarters was at Erskine Barracks, at Fugglestone St Peter, some four kilometres northwest of Salisbury in Wiltshire.

It assumed control of virtually all Army combat and combat support troops on 1 April 1995. Three major exceptions were Cyprus, the Falklands Islands, and Northern Ireland, where the General Officer Commanding reported to the Secretary of State for Northern Ireland for operations in support of the civil power.

== Predecessors ==
Discussion was underway within the Ministry of Defence by 1967 to create a proposed Army Strategic Command.

The headquarters, abbreviated as STRATCO, was established on 1 April 1968 in the wake of the government's decision, announced in January of that year, to withdraw all British troops from bases east of Suez. In future Britain's defence efforts would be concentrated 'mainly in Europe and the North Atlantic area'. Its major task was to direct the strategic reserves of the British Army; its headquarters was formed from HQ Southern Command at Erskine Barracks near Fugglestone (Wilton, Wiltshire). The first Commander-in-chief of the new Command was Lieutenant General Sir John Mogg KCB, CBE, DSO, (previously Commander-in-chief, Southern Command), who described the reasoning behind its formation as being: "to raise the standard and training of field force units to ensure any force sent abroad is correctly prepared, equipped and mounted to carry out its task speedily and successfully".

STRATCO commanded most of the UK-based field forces for all matters except local administration.

The command's tasks outside the British Isles were:

- Central Treaty Organisation and Southeast Asia Treaty Organisation commitments
- Bilateral agreements
- Residual colonial responsibility to the colonial territories
- To NATO, to provide forces in certain circumstances to deter or defend against the Soviet Union/Warsaw Pact.

Army Strategic Command consisted of two divisions, 3rd and 5th Infantry Divisions, and command troops. 3rd Division controlled 5th Infantry Brigade, 19th, 24th Infantry Brigades and 16th Parachute Brigade. 3rd Division was also responsible for training of the British battalion designated for the NATO ACE Mobile Force (Land). Headquarters 1 Signal Group (STRATCO) was formed the same day to coordinate signals units with the same responsibilities.

5th Division comprised 2nd, 8th and 39 Brigades. 2nd and 8th Brigades had skeleton headquarters which were raised at about the same time as the divisional headquarters. However, 5th Infantry Division was little more than a holding organisation for battalions resting between operational commitments abroad. The division was disbanded again in 1970.

From 1971–72 to the mid-1990s, land forces in the British Isles were the responsibility of United Kingdom Land Forces, one of the two foremost Army commands, the other being the British Army of the Rhine.

== HQ Land Command, 1995–2008 ==
In 1995, HQ United Kingdom Land Forces at Wilton assumed control of troops in Germany and most other places. The remaining British Army troops in Germany (including the core of Headquarters Allied Command Europe Rapid Reaction Corps, HQ ARRC) were placed under its command after the disbandment of Headquarters British Army of the Rhine. It became HQ Land Command, and assumed control of almost all British Army combat and combat support units on 1 April 1995. When it was formed it included 69,200 regular troops (6,400 officers and 62,800 other ranks), 59,700 reservists and 14,200 civil servants.

It initially embraced all operational troops in the UK, Germany (including HQ ARRC, 1st Armoured Division, and United Kingdom Support Command (Germany)), Nepal and Brunei, as well as the British Army Training Unit Suffield in Canada; British Army Training Unit Kenya; and the training team in Belize. The command represented 72% of the Army's manpower and virtually all of its fighting forces. Bringing all the army's conventional fighting forces into one command allowed the new commander-in-chief, initially General Sir John Wilsey, to better prioritise operational commitments and to reduce the higher overhead costs previously spent in maintaining four-star operational commands both in the UK and in Germany. HQ Land Command was given control of several functions previously executed by the General Staff within the Ministry of Defence (Army). These include the Operational Tour Plot for duties in Northern Ireland, to the Falkland Islands and in support of the United Nations, and the Arms Plot, the routine rotation of armoured, artillery and infantry units between postings.

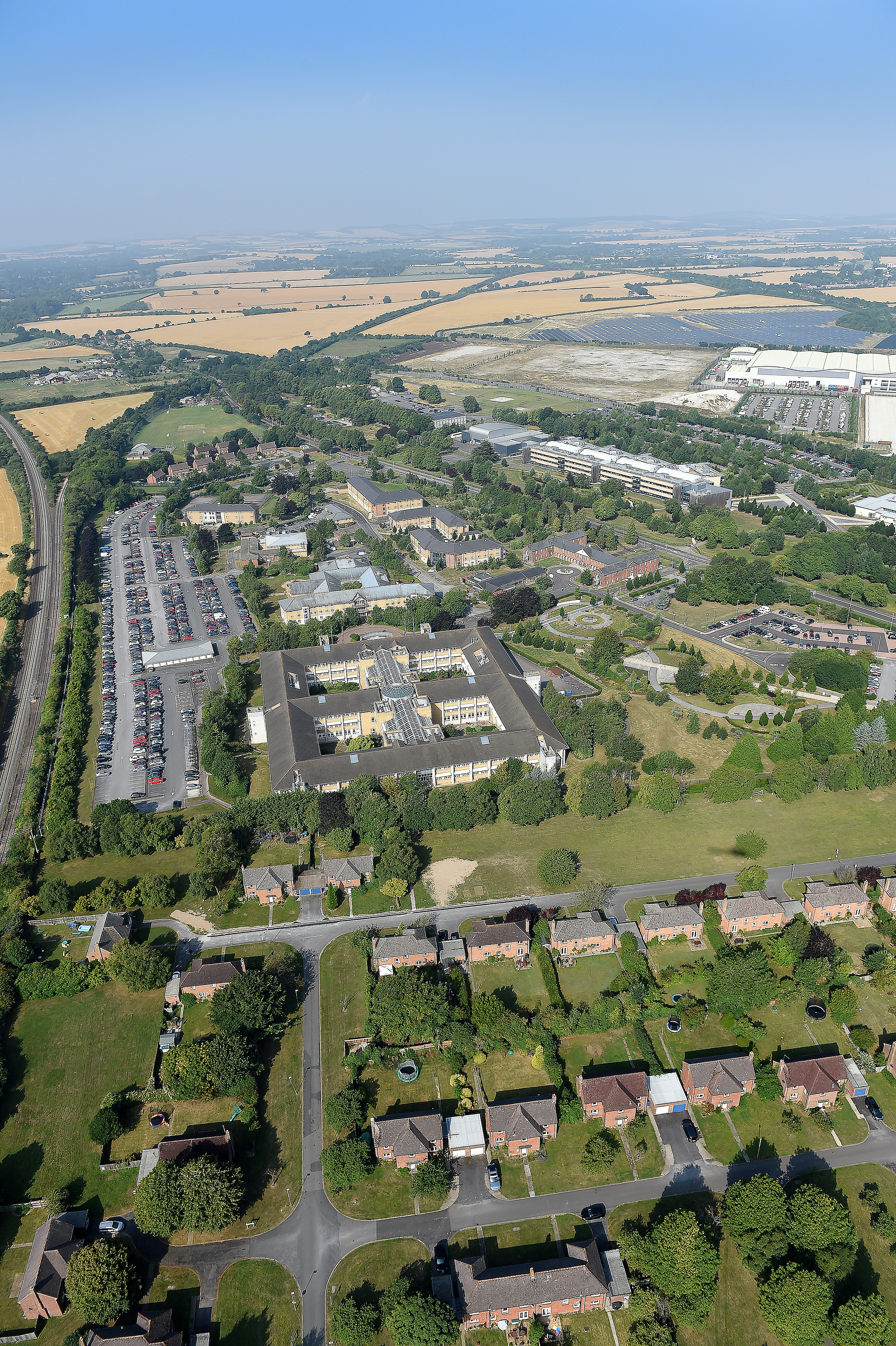
Marlborough Lines, Andover

Major forces not under Land Command's aegis remained British Forces Cyprus (with many units committed to the United Nations), the Falkland Islands, units under Director Special Forces, and Headquarters Northern Ireland. In the last of those, the General Officer commanding reported to the Secretary of State for Northern Ireland for operations in support of the civil power.

Wilsey also became Joint Commander for British military operations in the Former Republic of Yugoslavia including Operation Grapple, UNPROFOR.

On 1 April 2008, HQ Land Command amalgamated with HQ Adjutant General under 'Project Hyperion' and became HQ Land Forces. It moved from Erskine Barracks to the former RAF Andover site now known as Marlborough Lines on 23 June 2010.

== Components of the organisation ==
Land Command was initially divided into eight formations, each one commanded by a Major General, and several smaller units including the training units and training support units in Belize, Brunei, Canada (Suffield for armoured battlegroups and Wainwright for infantry units) and Kenya.

=== Divisions and Districts ===
Land Command was later divided in 2003, under the LANDmark reorganisation, into two suborganisations, Field Army and Regional Forces, that paralleled the Cold War structure of UKLF. Commander Field Army had two deployable divisions (1st Armoured Division, 3rd Mechanised Division), Theatre Troops, Joint Helicopter Command, and Training Support under him, while Commander Regional Forces was responsible for three regenerative Divisions (2nd Division, 4th Division, 5th Division), London District, and United Kingdom Support Command (Germany). In 2007 it was announced that a new deployable divisional headquarters (HQ) would be established until at least 2011, as a means of meeting the UK's commitments to provide divisional HQs on a rotational basis to Regional Command South in Afghanistan and as the lead nation of Multi-National Division (South-East) in Iraq. This headquarters was based in York, the re-established HQ 6th Division.

HQs 2, 4, and 5 Divisions (originally referred to as Regenerative Divisions) effectively used to act as military districts in the UK itself. They would only have been able to generate field formations in the event of a general war. These three divisions were disbanded in Spring 2012 and the component units were transferred to Support Command.

After 2012, British Forces Germany formed the district HQ for personnel based in Germany that were not attached to military formations.

London District's most public concern was the administration of ceremonial units and provision of garrisons for such installations as the Tower of London. However, its primary responsibility was to maintain units directly for the defence of the capital.

=== Brigades ===
By 1999–2000, five years after the command was established, the British Army had only seven genuinely operational, deployable brigade groups – the six incorporated in 1st Armoured Division and 3rd Mechanised Division, plus 16 Air Assault Brigade. 16 Air Assault Brigade was formed as part of the 1999 Strategic Defence Review force reductions. On 1 September 1999, the brigade was formed by merging of 24 Airmobile Brigade and elements of 5th Airborne Brigade.

In November 2007, the Ministry of Defence announced the temporary creation of another deployable brigade, designated as 11 Light Brigade, which commanded the Operation Herrick rotation between October 2009 and April 2010.

3 Commando Brigade, formed predominantly by units of the Royal Marines but with significant army support, was under the direct command of the Commander-in-Chief Fleet (CINCFLEET).

The numerous other ‘brigades’ within the new Support Command were better described as regional districts whose function is to administer all Territorial Army units within their area, and to coordinate the provision of support to the civil authority if necessary, as well as home defence tasks. An example was the coordination of military support the regional brigades did during the foot and mouth disease outbreak in 2001. The fourteen new Civil Contingency Response Forces (CCRFs), each parented by a TA infantry battalion, were also linked into this structure. They form force elements which may be called on, alongside regular units, by the established chain of command (Ministry of Defence, Army Headquarters, HQ Land Forces, Support Command and Regional Brigades) in the event of a request for military assistance by the civil authorities.

There were a number of specialist brigades which bring together under a single administrative apparatus several units performing similar functions. There were two logistic brigades 102 Logistic Brigade in Germany and 101 Logistic Brigade which contained logistic units to support the two deployable divisions directly. They were formed from the original Combat Service Support Groups (Germany) (CSSG (G)) and CSSG (United Kingdom) (CSSG (UK)). Additionally 104th Logistic Support Brigade operated the specialist units needed to deploy a force overseas such as pioneers, movements and port units. These brigades came under the authority of the GOC, Theatre Troops.

== General Officer Commanding-in-Chief, Army Strategic Command ==
See Commander Land Forces

== Commander-in-Chief, United Kingdom Land Forces ==
See Commander Land Forces

== Commander-in-Chief, Land Command ==
See Commander Land Forces
