= Army Headquarters =

Army Headquarters may refer to

- Army Headquarters or GHQ India (General Headquarters India), British India
- Army Headquarters or General Headquarters (Pakistan Army)
- Army Headquarters (Sri Lanka)
- Army Headquarters (United Kingdom)
- Army Headquarters (Australia), Victoria Barracks, Sydney
