= Cyber and Electro Magnetic Activities Effects Group =

Formation of the British Army

Cyber and Electro Magnetic Activities Effects Group (CEMA Effects Gp)
- Cap badge of the Royal Corps of Signals
- Active: from 2022
- Country: United Kingdom
- Branch: British Army
- Role: Cyber and Electronic intelligence
- Size: Group
- Part of: Land Forces Troops
- Group HQ: Marlborough Lines, Andover
- Website: CEMA Effects Group

The Cyber and Electro Magnetic Activities Effects Group (CEMA Effects Group) is a combat support formation of the British Army formed in 2024. The group brings together three specialist regiments of the Royal Corps of Signals under Commander Field Army.

== History ==
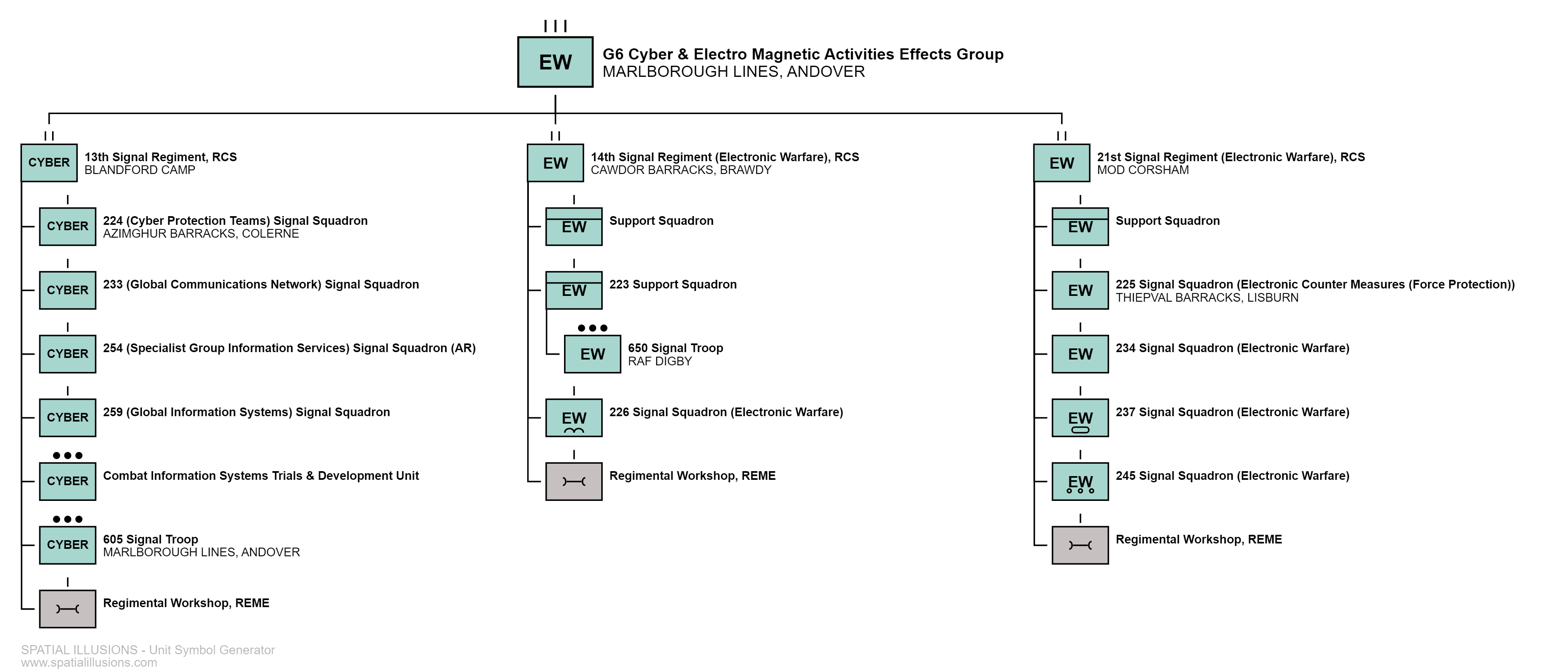
Graphic of the planned structure for the CEMAS Effects Group.

As part of the Army 2020 and subsequently Army 2020 Refine programmes, the 14th Signal Regiment (Electronic Warfare) under control of the 1st Intelligence, Surveillance and Reconnaissance Brigade (6th (UK) Division), while the 13th Signal Regiment was formed in June 2020 under 1st (UK) Signal Brigade (6th (UK) Division) as the first dedicated cyber unit. The last regiment, 21st Signal Regiment was under 7th Signal Group, part of 11th Signal Brigade and Headquarters West Midlands (1st (UK) Division, later 3rd (UK) Division). However, under the Future Soldier programme, these three units will be grouped together into a new Colonel's command (Group) and become the "Cyber and Electro Magnetic Activities Effects Group".

The group will, alongside 16th Air Assault Brigade Combat Team, the Intelligence, Surveillance, and Reconnaissance Group, 2nd Medical Group, and the Land Warfare Centre be part of Field Army Troops, a sub-command of the Field Army which is under direct control of Field Army HQ.

The group's role was described as follows "The Cyber and Electro Magnetic Activities (CEMA) Effects Group will command the Army's two Electronic Warfare and Signals Intelligence (EWSI) regiments; 14th and 21st Signals Regiments, and the cyber regiment, 13th Signals Regiment; delivering cutting edge technical capability to the point of need".

== Structure ==
The structure of the group by 2030 will be as follows:

- Group Headquarters, at Marlborough Lines, Andover
  - 13th Signal Regiment, Royal Corps of Signals, at Basil Hill Barracks, Corsham – cyber operations
  - 14th Signal Regiment, Royal Corps of Signals, at Imjin Barracks, Innsworth – electronic warfare operations
  - 21st Signal Regiment, Royal Corps of Signals, at Colerne Station, Chippenham – electronic warfare operations
