= 1st Military Police Brigade =

- Brigade Tactical Recognition Flash
- Active: 1 December 2014–present
- Country: United Kingdom
- Branch: British Army
- Type: Military Police
- Size: Brigade
- Part of: Army Headquarters
- Brigade HQ: Marlborough Lines, Andover

The 1st Military Police Brigade (1 MP Bde) is a policing formation of the British Army, which is the only one-star command of the Royal Military Police. The brigade was formed in 2014 and is commanded by a brigadier.

== History ==
=== Army 2020 ===
Prior to December 2014, the military police regiments of the Royal Military Police (RMP) were part of their respective commands: 1st Regiment under 1st (UK) Armoured Division; 2nd Regiment under Headquarters Northern Ireland (reformed in 2006, unknown history after 2007); 3rd Regiment under 3rd (UK) Mechanised Division; 4th Regiment under 101st Logistic Brigade; and 5th Regiment under 102nd Logistic Brigade. However, under the Army 2020 programme announced in 2013, following the Strategic Defence and Security Review of 2010, the Royal Military Police was rationalised and completely reorganised, among other things. Under this reform, the 2nd and 5th Regiments were to disband and their companies either disbanded or transferred to the three remaining regiments (1st, 3rd, and 4th). These three regiments would become 'hybrid' and 'integrated' police units, each with two regular provost companies and one territorial (reserve from 2015) company. In addition, the new Special Operations Unit, RMP which stood up in 2014.

On formation on 1 December 2014, the brigade was organised as follows:

- Brigade Headquarters, at Marlborough Lines, Andover
- 1st Regiment, Royal Military Police, at Gaza Barracks, Catterick Garrison
  - 110 Provost Company, at Leuchars Station
  - 150 Provost Company, at Beach Head Lines, Catterick Garrison
  - 243 Provost Company (Army Reserve), in Livingston
    - 252 Platoon, in Stockton-on-Tees
- 3rd Regiment, Royal Military Police, at Wing Barracks, Bulford Camp
  - 158 Provost Company, at Kiwi Barracks, Bulford Camp
  - 174 Provost Company, at Parsons Barracks, Donnington
  - 116 Provost Company (Army Reserve), in Cannock
    - 2 Platoon, in Manchester
- 4th Regiment, Royal Military Police, at Provost Barracks, Aldershot Garrison
  - 160 Provost Company
  - 156 Provost Company, at Goojerat Barracks, Colchester Garrison – supporting 16th Air Assault Bde
  - 253 (London) Provost Company (Army Reserve), in Tulse Hill
- Special Investigation Branch Regiment, Royal Military Police, at Ward Barracks, Bulford Camp
  - No. 1 Investigation Company, at Imphal Barracks, York
  - No. 2 Investigation Company, at Parsons Barracks, Donnington
  - No. 3 Investigation Company
    - 37 Investigations Section, at Parsons Barracks, Donnington
  - No. 4 Investigation (Special Crimes Team) Company
  - 83 Investigations Section (Army Reserve), at Bulford Camp
  - 84 Investigations Section (Army Reserve), at Bulford Camp
  - 85 Investigations Section (Army Reserve), at Bulford Camp
- Special Operations Regiment, Royal Military Police, at Longmoor Army Camp – later moved to Southwick Park
  - Service Police Crime Bureau
  - Royal Military Police Close Protection Unit
- Military Provost Staff Corps, at Colchester Garrison
  - Regimental Headquarters, at Berechurch Hall Camp
  - Military Corrective Training Centre, Colchester Garrison
  - Headquarters Company
  - SCF Company
  - Detention Company
  - No. 1 Company (Army Reserve)

From 2014 until the 2019 Field Army reorganisation, the brigade formed part of Force Troops Command, with the 1st Regiment supporting the 1st UK Division and northern UK operations; 3rd Regiment supporting 3rd UK Division and overseas operations; and 4th Regiment supporting Force Troops command and southern UK operations.

Rather unusually the brigade, unlike the other formations of Force Troops Command, only remained under the command for administrative purposes. Because of the Royal Military Police's special role, the brigade retained investigative independence from the chain of command, thus being part of Army Headquarters operationally.

On 1 December 2014, the brigade headquarters was established with the Provost Marshal (Army) taking control at Marlborough Lines in Andover, Hampshire known as the 1st Military Police Brigade.

=== Army 2020 Refine ===
In 2017, a supplement to the Army 2020 programme was announced entitled the Army 2020 Refine which reversed many of the unit-level changes of the former. Under the 'Refine', the 4th Regiment RMP was disbanded in late 2019 and its companies dispersed to the other two remaining regiments

The brigade's structure by 2021 was now as follows:

- 1st Regiment, Royal Military Police, at Gaza Barracks, Catterick Garrison
  - 110 Provost Company, at Leuchars Station
  - 150 Provost Company, at Beach Head Lines, Catterick Garrison
  - 174 Provost Company, at Parsons Barracks, Donnington
  - 116 Provost Company (Army Reserve), in Cannock
    - 2 Platoon, in Gorton, Manchester
  - 243 Provost Company (Army Reserve), in Livingston
    - 252 Platoon, in Stockton-on-Tees
- 3rd Regiment, Royal Military Police, at Wing Barracks, Bulford Camp
  - 158 Provost Company, at Kiwi Barracks, Bulford Camp
  - 156 Provost Company, at Goojerat Barracks, Colchester Garrison – supporting 16th Air Assault Bde
  - 160 Provost Company, at Provost Barracks, Aldershot Garrison
  - 253 (London) Provost Company (Army Reserve), in Tulse Hill
- Special Investigation Branch Regiment, Royal Military Police, at Ward Barracks, Bulford Camp
  - No. 1 Investigation Company, at Imphal Barracks, York
  - No. 2 Investigation Company, at Parsons Barracks, Donnington
  - No. 3 Investigation Company
    - 37 Investigations Section, at Parsons Barracks, Donnington
  - No. 4 Investigation (Special Crimes Team) Company
  - 83 Investigations Section (Army Reserve), at Bulford Camp
  - 84 Investigations Section (Army Reserve), at Bulford Camp
  - 85 Investigations Section (Army Reserve), at Bulford Camp
- Special Operations Regiment, Royal Military Police, at Longmoor Army Camp – later moved to Southwick Park
  - Service Police Crime Bureau
  - Royal Military Police Close Protection Unit
- Military Provost Staff Corps, at Colchester Garrison
  - Regimental Headquarters, at Berechurch Hall Camp
  - Military Corrective Training Centre, Colchester Garrison
  - Headquarters Company
  - SCF Company
  - Detention Company
  - No. 1 Company (Army Reserve)

In 2019, under the 2019 Field Army reorganisation, the entirety of the army's forces were reorganised. With this reorganisation, the 1st and 3rd Regiments RMP were moved to 101st Logistic Brigade, which was later reverted, and the brigade moved to Regional Command, which was also later reverted. By 2021, the brigade was re-organised into its pre-2019 structure, and the brigade moved under the administrative command of the 1st (United Kingdom) Division.

== Current organisation ==
The Special Investigation Branch Regiment was disbanded in 2022, and was replaced by the new tri-service Defence Serious Crime Unit.

The brigade's structure now consists of:

- 1st Regiment, Royal Military Police, at Gaza Barracks, Catterick Garrison
  - 110 Provost Company, at Leuchars Station
  - 150 Provost Company, at Beach Head Lines, Catterick Garrison
  - 174 Provost Company, at Parsons Barracks, Donnington
  - 116 Provost Company (Army Reserve), in Cannock
    - 2 Platoon, in Gorton, Manchester
  - 243 Provost Company (Army Reserve), in Livingston
    - 252 Platoon, in Stockton-on-Tees
- 3rd Regiment, Royal Military Police, at Wing Barracks, Bulford Camp
  - 158 Provost Company, at Kiwi Barracks, Bulford Camp
  - 156 Provost Company, at Goojerat Barracks, Colchester Garrison – supporting 16th Air Assault Bde
  - 160 Provost Company, at Provost Barracks, Aldershot Garrison
  - 253 (London) Provost Company (Army Reserve), in Tulse Hill
- Special Operations Regiment, Royal Military Police, at Southwick Park
  - Service Police Crime Bureau
  - Royal Military Police Close Protection Unit
- Military Provost Staff Corps, at Colchester Garrison
  - Regimental Headquarters, at Berechurch Hall Camp
  - Military Corrective Training Centre, Colchester Garrison
  - Headquarters Company
  - SCF Company
  - Detention Company
  - No. 1 Company (Army Reserve)

== Commanders ==
Commanders of the brigade have all been Provost Marshals and held the title of Provost Marshal (Army) & Commander, 1st Military Police Brigade.

Provost Marshal (Army) & Commander, 1st Military Police Brigade
Rank	Name	Term began	Term ended	Ref
Brigadier	Robert (Bill) W. Warren MBE	1 December 2014 — (Provost Marshal since 11 October 2012)	22 July 2016	
Brigadier	David Neal	22 July 2016	19 July 2019	
Brigadier	Vivienne Buck	19 July 2019	15 June 2023	
Brigadier	Sarah Pringle-Smith	15 June 2023	—	
