= 1st Regiment, Royal Military Police =

Military policing unit of the British Army

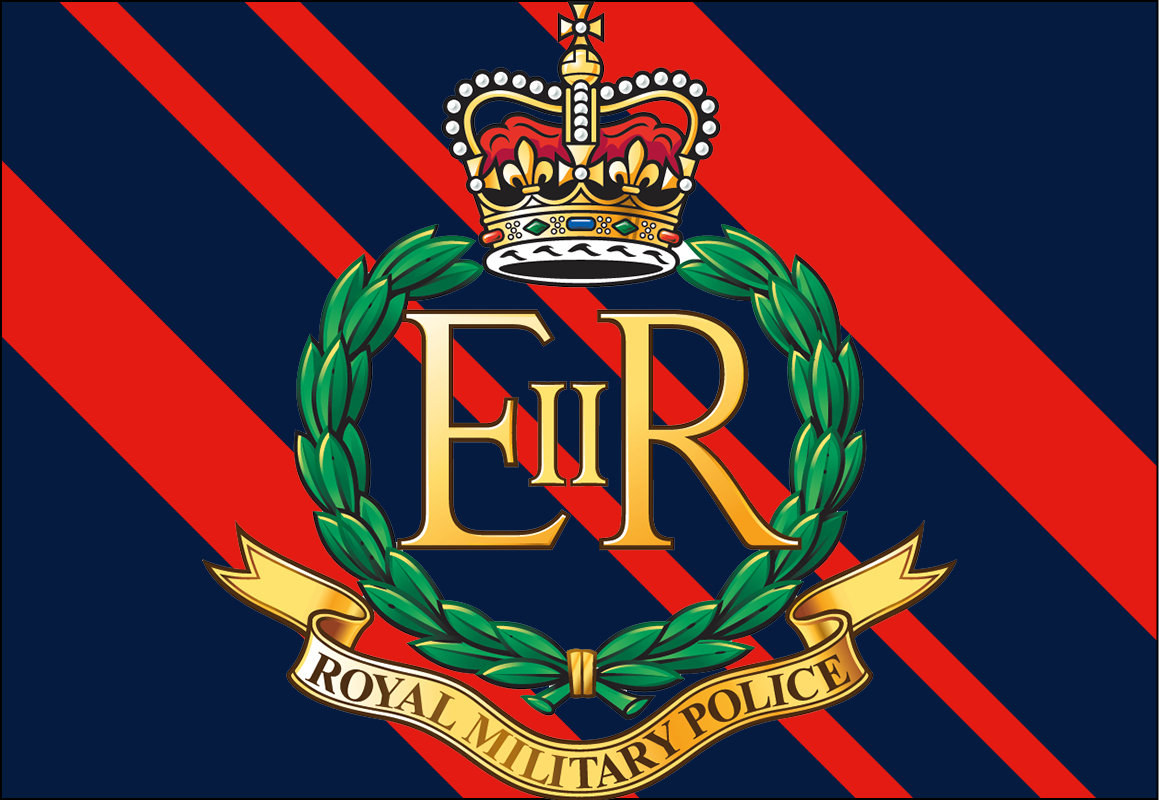
- Backboard of the Royal Military Police
- Active: 1971–1985; 1996–present
- Country: United Kingdom
- Branch: British Army
- Type: Military police
- Size: Regiment (Note: Since the creation of the first regiments in the 1970s, the term 'Regiment' in the Royal Military Police refers to a battalion sized unit commanded by a Lieutenant Colonel.)
- Part of: 1st Military Police Brigade
- Regimental HQ: Catterick Garrison
- Corps: Royal Military Police
- Engagements: Operation Banner; Operation Grapple; Operation Telic; Operation Herrick

Insignia
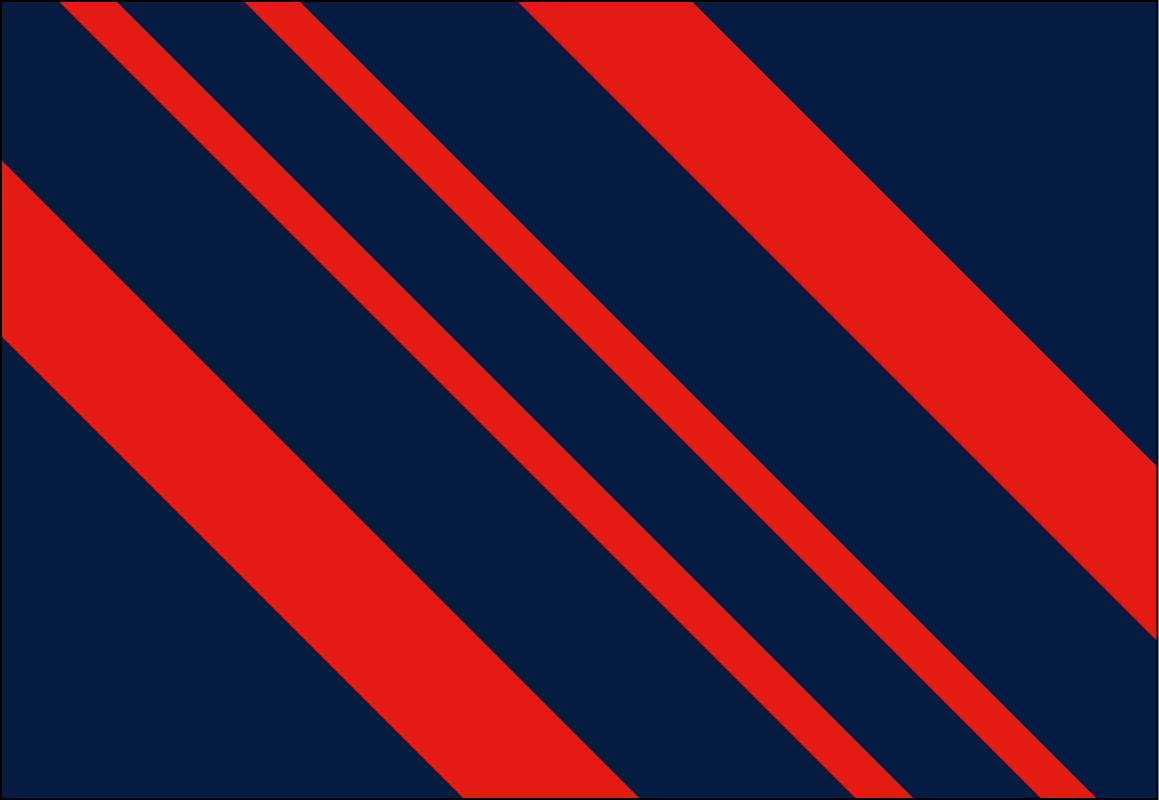
- Heraldic Background

- Tactical Recognition Flash

The 1st Regiment, Royal Military Police (1 RMP) is a military policing unit of the British Army which was formed during the height of the Troubles in Northern Ireland in the 1970s, but disbanded in 1985 following cuts to the RMP in the region. The regiment was then reformed in 1996 following the Options for Change, and since 2014 has been an integral part of the 1st Military Police Brigade and just one of the two remaining RMP regiments since 2019.

== History ==
=== First formation ===
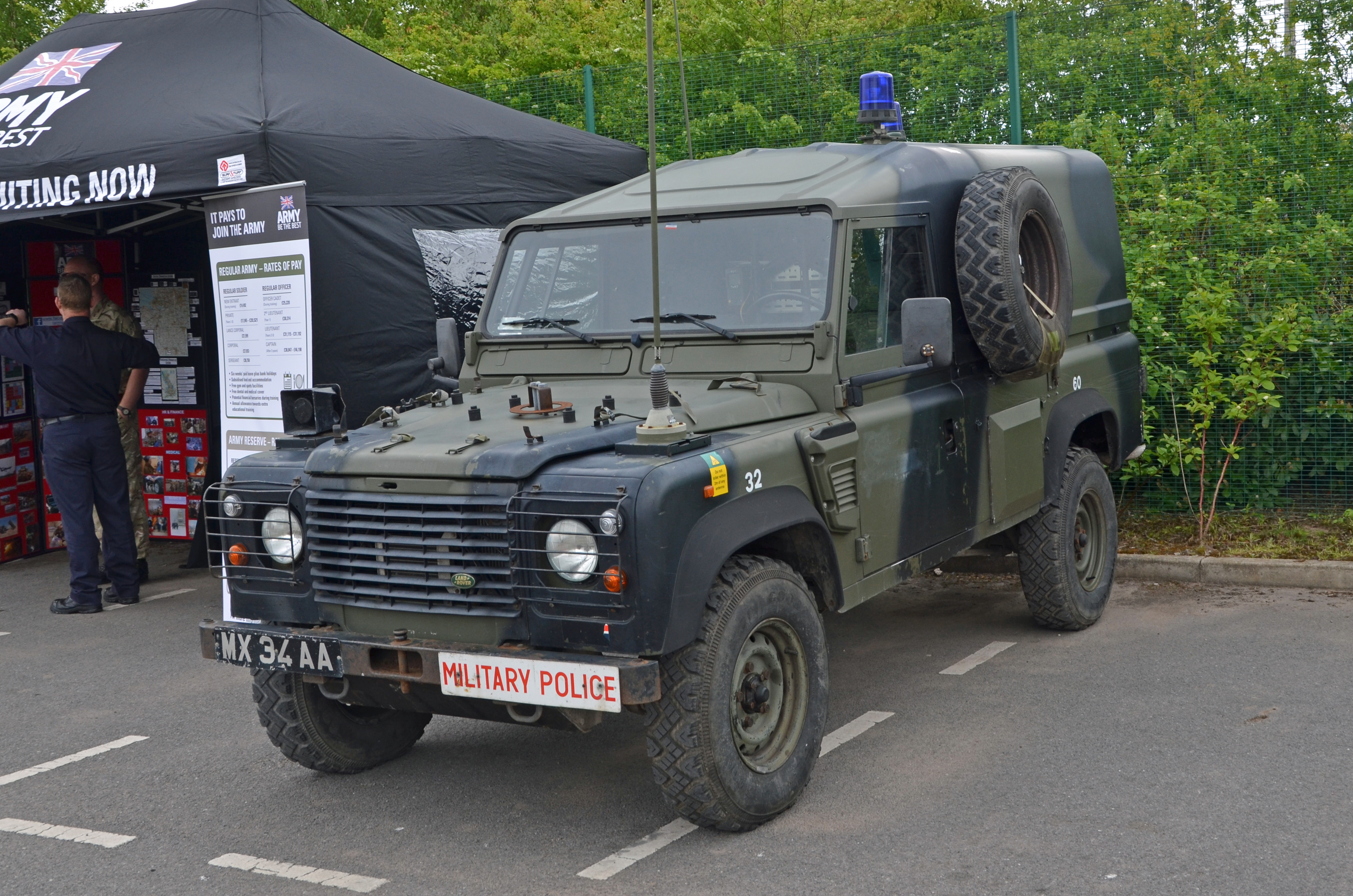
A Land Rover Defender utilised by the Royal Military Police while in Northern Ireland. The RMP is one of the few corps (units) which still uses the Land Rover.

The first time of the 1st Regiment, RMP was formed was on 5 November 1971, when 173 Provost Company based at Thiepval Barracks, Lisburn in Northern Ireland was expanded into a full regiment. Prior to 1971, all provost companies were independent and if grouped were commanded by a 'Deputy Provost Marshal', however the deteriorating situation in Northern Ireland caused this tradition to be dropped. As a result, the first battalion sized unit of the Royal Military Police was created as 173 Provost Company was quickly reinforced within months to become a regiment of seven companies. The regiment was the first of its type, soon after being joined by the 2nd Regiment during the looming Troubles which would occupy the British Army until 2007. The regiment's initial organisation on formation was as follows:

- Regimental Headquarters, at Thiepval Barracks, Lisburn
- 174 Provost Company, at Ardmillan House, Belfast – supporting 39th Infantry Brigade
- 175 Provost Company, at Thiepval Barracks, Lisburn
- 176 Provost Company, at Ebrington Barracks, Derry – supporting 8th Infantry Brigade
- 177 Provost Company, at Thiepval Barracks, Lisburn – providing close protection escorts
- 178 Provost Company, at Thiepval Barracks, Lisburn – investigations unit
- 179 Provost Company, at HMS Hartland Point – formed on 16 January 1972
- 180 Provost Company – formed for Operation Motorman, in June 1972 but disbanded in November of the same year

After a short time in Lisburn, the regimental headquarters moved to Alexander Barracks in Aldergrove on 5 December 1972. In June 1973, 180 Provost Company was reformed bringing the regiment's strength to about 700 personnel. On 1 July 1973, the duties of the regiment was split with the formation of the 2nd Regiment, Royal Military Police with 175, 179, and 180 Provost Companies joining shortly thereafter. However, on 1 April 1978, 2nd Regiment RMP was disbanded and its companies disbanded except for 175 Provost Company which re-joined the 1st Regiment.

In 1978, the regiment was now organised as follows:

- Regimental Headquarters, at Alexander Barracks, Aldergrove (until September), then at Thiepval Barracks, Lisburn
- 174 Provost Company, at Drumadd Barracks, Armagh – supporting 3rd Infantry Brigade since 18 February 1972
- 175 Provost Company, at Thiepval Barracks, Lisburn
- 176 Provost Company, at Ebrington Barracks, Derry – supporting 8th Infantry Brigade
- 177 Provost Company, at Thiepval Barracks, Lisburn – providing close protection escorts
- 178 Provost Company, at Thiepval Barracks, Lisburn – investigations unit

From 1981 till the regiment's disbandment in March 1985, the strength of the unit gradually decreased. On 31 December 1981, 174 Provost Company was disbanded alongside 3rd Infantry Brigade; on 30 September 1983 177 Provost Company was reduced to 177 (Support) Platoon and became independent under Headquarters Northern Ireland; on 12 February 1985 175 and 176 Provost Companies became independent while 178 Provost Company was re-designated as 173 Provost Company; finally in March 1985, 173 Provost Company became independent and the regiment was disbanded.

On 12 February 1985, the regiment was officially removed from the Army's order of battle due to financial reasons following the 1981 Defence White Paper.

=== Second formation ===
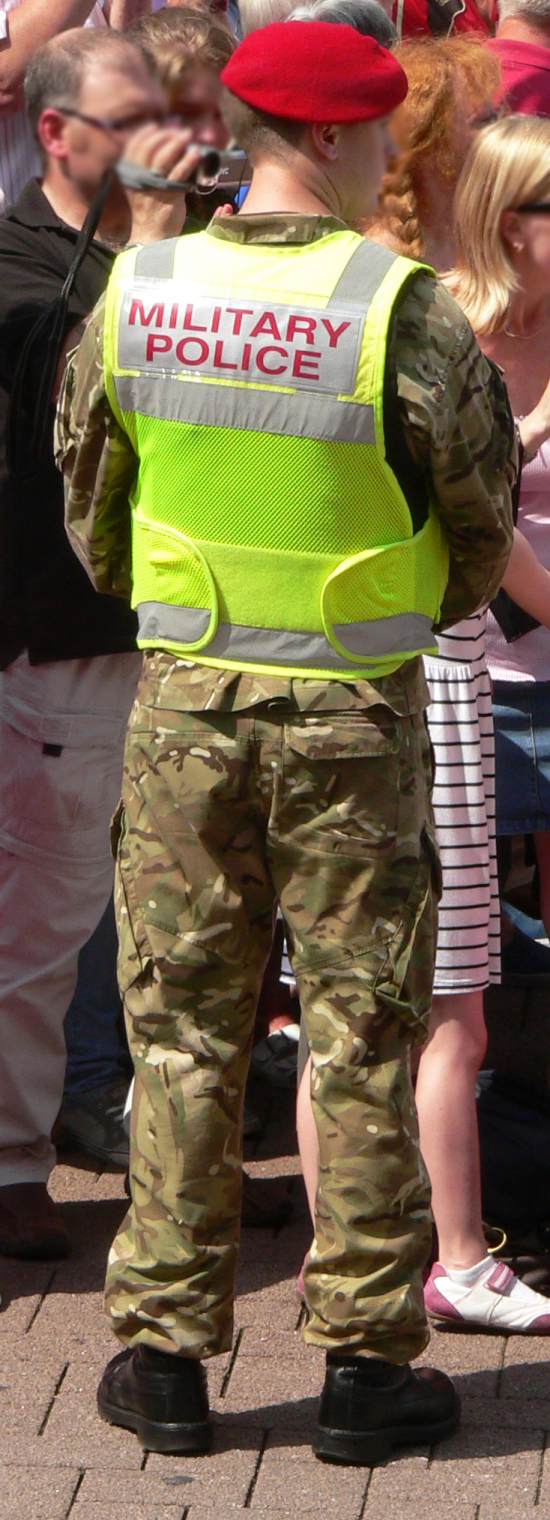
A military policeman of 1st Regiment RMP while deployed in Germany in 2012.

As a result of the Options for Change reforms announced in 1991 following the End of the Cold War, the old 1st Armoured Division was redesignated as the 1st (United Kingdom) Armoured Division and its provost companies reorganised. As a result of the reorganisation, the 1st Regiment, Royal Military Police was stood up at Wentworth Barracks in Herford to oversee these companies with each supporting one of the combat brigades. The regiment's structure after formation on 1 April 1995 was as follows:

- Regimental Headquarters, at Wentworth Barracks, Herford
- 110 Provost Company, at Normandy Barracks, Sennelager – supporting 20th Armoured Brigade and Paderborn Garrison
- 111 Provost Company, at Haig Barracks, Bergen-Hohne – supporting 7th Armoured Brigade and Hohne Garrison (Note: Until 2013, (when the Bergen-Hohne Garrison was reduced to station), the garrison comprised three 'stations': Bergen-Hohne, Celle, and Bad Fallingbostel. The provost company maintained a small detachment at each of these during this time.)
- 115 Provost Company, at Roberts Barracks, Osnabrück – supporting 4th Armoured Brigade

In later 1996, elements of the regiment deployed to Bosnia and Herzegovina as part of the Stabilisation Force in Bosnia and Herzegovina (SFOR). On the regiment's return from Bosnia, during a parade in Herford, the regiment was granted the Wilkinson Sword of Peace.

According to the 1999 Staff Officers' Handbook, the establishment for 1st Regiment RMP was 18 officers and 343 other ranks. The regiment was also equipped with 4 x Leyland 4-tonne trucks, 109 x B-class vehicles including Land Rover Defenders, and 34 x Armstrong-CCM Motorcycles. Following the reformation of the regiment, the commanding officer of the regiment held the position of 'Provost Marshal, 1st (UK) Armoured Division', and was assisted by three other officers at the armoured division headquarters: Staff Officer (SO)2 (Operations/Plans) – rank of Major, SO3 (Investigations) – rank of Captain, and SO3 (Ops/Plans) – rank of Captain. If mobilised, the Special Investigation Branch detachments in Germany would form the nucleus of the Investigations Section of the regiment.

When the 1st (UK) Armoured Division was deployed to Saudi Arabia in 2003 for the impending 2003 Invasion of Iraq (codenamed Operation Telic), the regiment was deployed and involved in provost duties throughout the campaign.

In 2003, as a result of the Future Army Structure programme announced following the Invasion of Iraq, the regiment was effectively reduced to an administrative command and its provost companies moved under the operational control of the 1st (UK) Armoured Division's armoured brigades. The regiment's structure in 2006 was as follows:

- Regimental Headquarters, at Wentworth Barracks, Herford
- 110 Provost Company, in Paderborn – supporting 20th Armoured Brigade
  - Non-established Police Post, in Hameln
- 111 Provost Company, in Bergen-Hohne – supporting 7th Armoured Brigade
  - Non-established Police Post, in Fallingbostel
- 114 Provost Company, at Princess Royal Barracks, Gütersloh – supporting 102nd Logistic Brigade and Gütersloh Garrison (Note: Gütersloh Garrison comprised four stations: Gütersloh, Herford, Bielefeld, and Dülmen. 114 Provost Company provided detachments to each of these stations until 2008, when the company was moved to 1st Regiment RMP from 5th Regiment RMP. From this point, the company also provided support for 102nd Logistic Brigade.)
- 115 Provost Company, at Roberts Barracks, Osnabrück (disbanded in June 2008) – supporting 4th Armoured Brigade (Note: Under the Future Army Structure, the 4th Armoured Brigade was reorganised as a mechanised brigade, thus became the 4th Mechanised Brigade. Until the brigade's conversion in 2008, 115 Provost Company provided support to the brigade, but this was discontinued that year. In 2008, 150 Provost Company took over the 4th Mechanised Brigade support role under 3rd Regiment, RMP.)
  - Non-established Police Post, in Münster

=== Army 2020 ===
In 2012, following the Strategic Defence and Security Review 2010, the radical Army 2020 programme was announced which (among many things), would see the reorganisation of the provost forces and return of all troops based in Germany. As part of the A2020 programme, the three provost regiments alongside the three specialist police groups would be consolidated into the 1st Military Police Brigade. In addition, the Royal Military Police would be consolidated into three regiments, the 1st Regiment: providing support for the 1st (UK) Division based in York; 3rd Regiment: providing support for the 3rd (UK) Division based in Bulford; and the 4th Regiment: providing support for UK operations and Force Troops Command. The structure of all three regiments was also altered, so that there were no longer entirely regular regiments, with each regiment having at least one integrated Territorial (Army Reserve from 2015) company attached, thus making each unit a 'Hybrid' regiment.

The 1st Regiment RMP became an 'Integrated RMP Regiment' as a result of the changes, and transferred from 1st (UK) Division to the 1st Military Police upon that brigade's formation on 1 December 2014. After 2015, the regiment returned from Germany and has been based at Gaza Barracks, Catterick Garrison in the North Riding of Yorkshire ever since.

111 Provost Company was disbanded in June 2014 following their return from Afghanistan. Later 114 Provost Company was also disbanded before the regiment left Germany.

By January 2015, the regiment now oversaw 243 Provost Company, which was formed in January 2015 by merging the former 243 (Scottish) Provost Company based in Livingston with 252 (Northern) Provost Company based in Stockton-on-Tees. The new 243 Provost Coy was now based in Livingston and maintained 252 Platoon in Stockton-on-Tees in County Durham.

In 2015, the regiment was now organised as follows:

- Regimental Headquarters, at Gaza Barracks, Catterick Garrison
- 110 Provost Company, at Leuchars Station (detachment was based in Bergen-Hohne until mid 2015)
- 150 Provost Company
- 243 Provost Company (Army Reserve), in Livingston
  - 252 Platoon, in Stockton-on-Tees

== Today and future ==
In 2017, a supplement to the Army 2020 programme was announced entitled the Army 2020 Refine which reversed many of the unit-level changes of the former. Under the 'Refine', the 4th Regiment RMP was disbanded in late 2019 and its companies dispersed to the other two remaining regiments, including 1st Regiment RMP. The regiment gained the Army Reserve's 116 Provost Company based in Cannock and Gorton, in addition to the regular 174 Provost Company based in Donnington. The regiment is currently organised as follows:

- Regimental Headquarters, at Gaza Barracks, Catterick Garrison
- 110 Provost Company, at Leuchars Station
- 150 Provost Company
- 174 Provost Company, at Parsons Barracks, Donnington
- 116 Provost Company (Army Reserve), in Cannock
  - Platoon, in Gorton, Manchester
- 243 Provost Company (Army Reserve), in Livingston
  - 252 Platoon, in Stockton-on-Tees

In addition to the internal reorganisations, the regiment was transferred to 101st Logistic Brigade, but this decision was reversed during the 2019 Field Army reorganisation.

Under the Future Soldier changes, the regiment will restructure by March 2025, though its future sub-units are unknown at this time.
