= 2nd Medical Group =

- Group Tactical Recognition Flash
- Active: 1 August 2002 – present
- Country: United Kingdom
- Branch: British Army
- Role: Medical services
- Size: Brigade
- Part of: Field Army Troops
- Group HQ: Queen Elizabeth Barracks, Strensall

2nd Medical Group (2 Med Gp) is a formation of the British Army under Field Army Troops. It predominantly provides deployed hospital care via 11 Multi-Role Medical Regiments. It also provides specialist medical capabilities via three Nationally Recruited Reserve Units; 306 Hospital Support Regiment, 335 Medical Evacuation Regiment and the Medical Operational Support Unit.

== History ==
Headquarters 2nd Medical Group, formerly known as 2nd Medical Brigade, was initially formed at Imphal Barracks, York under the title of The Medical Group on 1 April 2002, as a result of the Strategic Defence Review.

In March 2020, as part of Operation Rescript, 256th (London and South East) Multi-Role Medical Regiment, then known as 256 Field Hospital, helped construct a temporary critical care hospital, named NHS Nightingale Hospital London, during the COVID-19 pandemic in the United Kingdom.

Under the Future Soldier programme announced on 25 November 2021, the formation was reduced to a Colonel's Command. Subsequently, many units were moved under direct command of the divisions. The formerly named 2 Medical Brigade became 2 Medical Group. In addition, the group transferred from 1st Division to Field Army Troops, reporting directly to Commander Field Army. The role of the group was described as follows: "The 2nd Medical Group will generate field hospitals and task-organised medical support to the deployed force. It will be significantly reinforced by Army Reserve multi-role medical regiments and specialist medical capabilities.

== Role ==
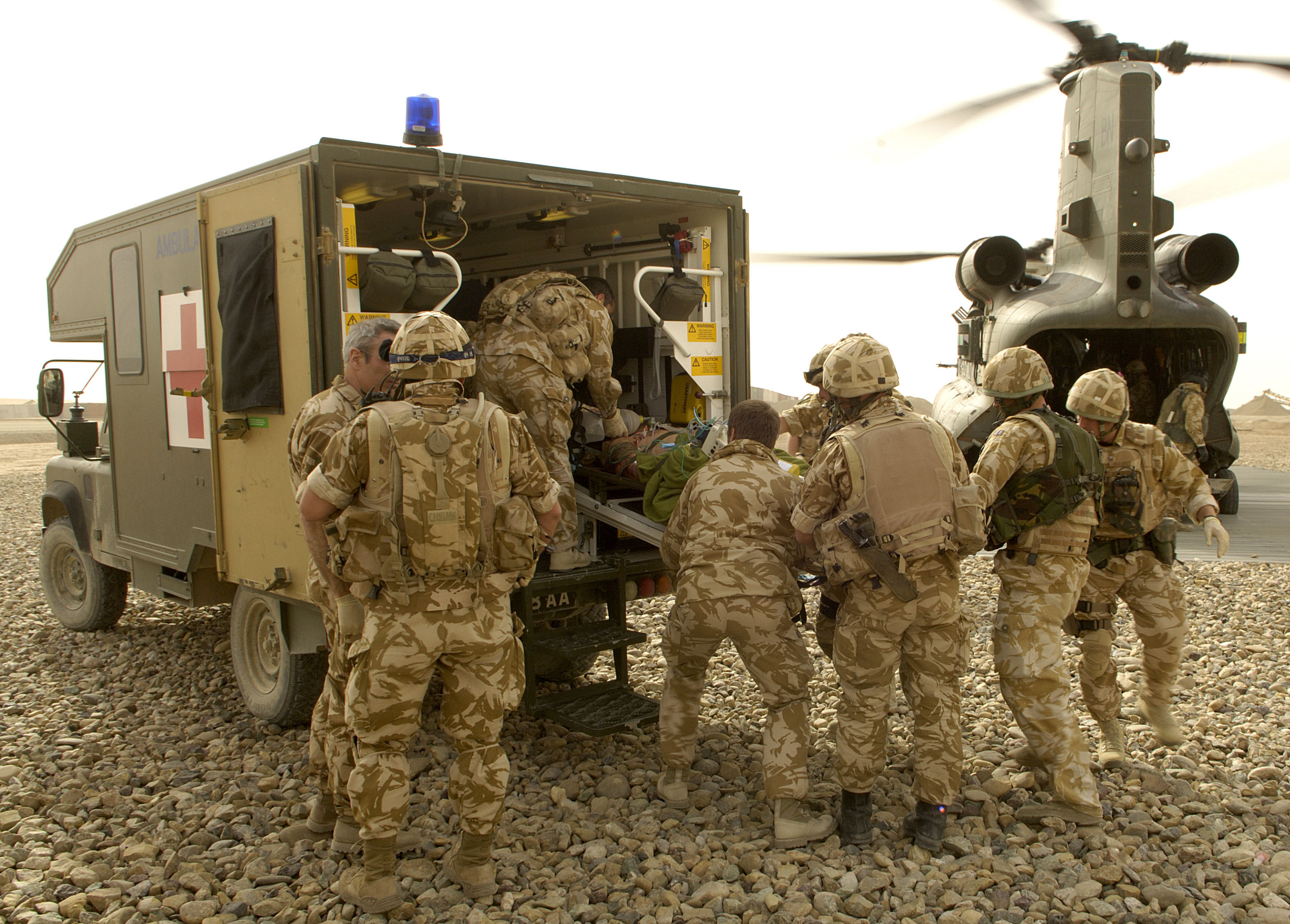
MERT recovering a casualty that had been evacuated via Chinook helicopter in Afghanistan.

The HQ has operational command of 2 Regular Multi-Role Medical Regiments, 9 Reserve Multi-Role Medical Regiments, a Reserve medical evacuation regiment, a Reserve hospital support regiment, and the Reserve Medical Operations Support Unit, which provides small teams of pre-qualified medical staff officers to support operations and exercises. The group also provides the enhanced medical operational command and control (C2) capability lost by the Army Medical Services (AMS). The group has significantly raised the quality of pre-deployment medical training, seeing it previously provide a high standard of field medical care at field hospitals in Afghanistan.

The soldiers and officers of 306 Hospital Support Regiment are all fulltime NHS Consultants and Specialist Nurses, in niche areas such as women's health, paediatrics, head & neck, CT scanning, and neurosurgical, who serve as reservists in their spare time.

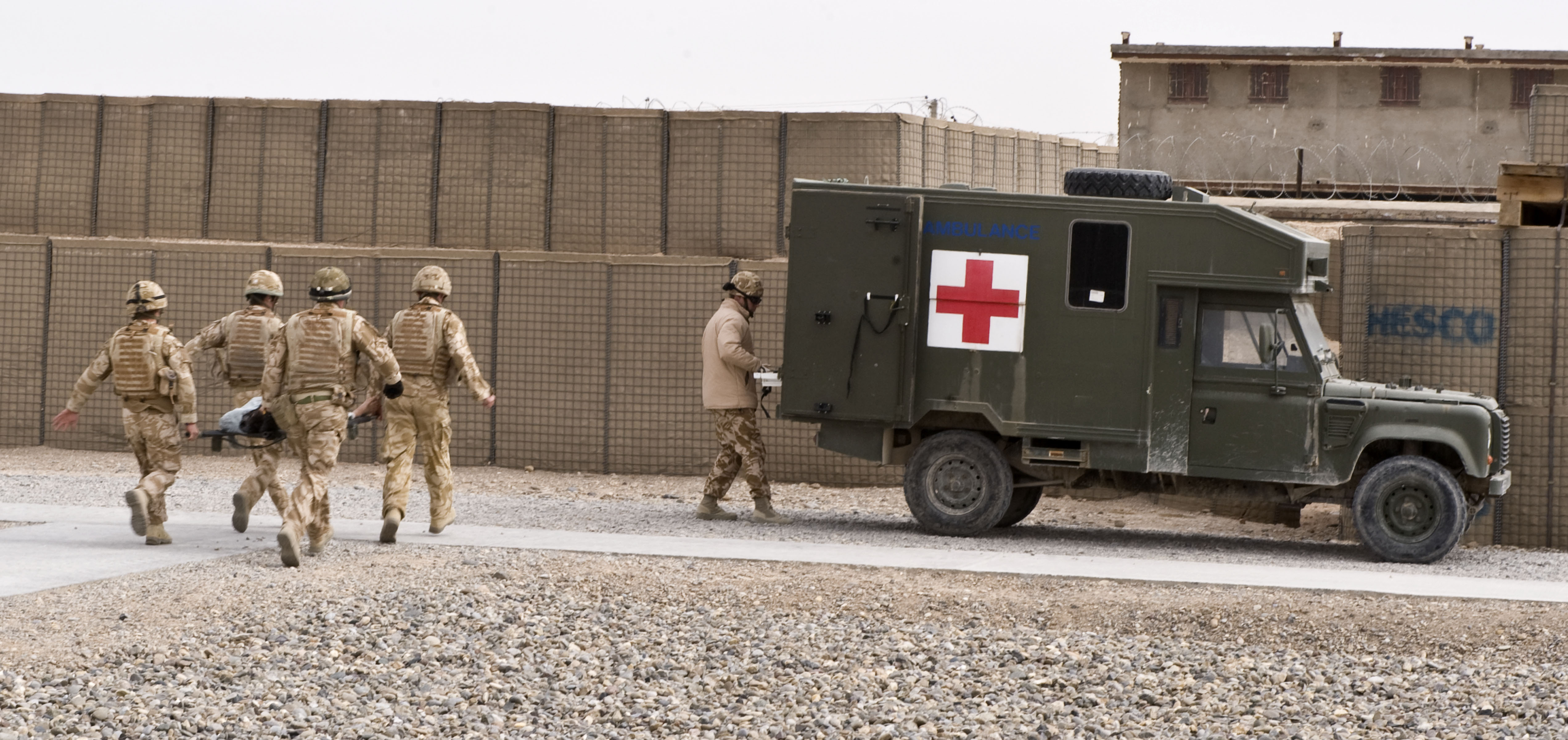
MERT (Medical Emergency Response Team) evacuating a casualty in Lashkar Gar, Helmand, Afghanistan.

335 Medical Evacuation Regiment are specialists in medevac or 'in transit care', moving critical care patients across land operations, providing capabilities such as Medical Emergency Response Teams (MERT), Forward Medical Evacuation Teams, Pre-Hospital Treatment Teams, Tactical Medical Evacuation Teams. It also provides ambulance crews that are trained in all NATO ambulance platforms. The regiment has deployed personnel on every major offensive, peacekeeping and humanitarian operation since its formation in 2005, including Operation GRITROCK (Sierra Leone), Operation HERRICK (Afghanistan), Operation TELIC (Iraq), Operation TOSCA (Cyprus) and Operation TRENTON (South Sudan).

The Group Headquarters is based at Queen Elizabeth Barracks, Strensall, North Yorkshire. The barracks had been planned to close in 2024, however Defence Procurement Minister, James Cartlidge, later announced that the barracks would be retained and receive additional investment to remain home of the 2nd Medical Group for the future.

== Emblem ==
The centre cross within the emblem represents the Red Cross, under which the majority of the AMS operates in accordance with the Geneva Conventions.

The Rod and the Serpent - The centre of the emblem depicts the Rod of Aesculapius who lived in ancient Greece in the year 1256BC. Aesculapius was known in ancient Greece as the father of medicine and was raised to God status according to Greek mythology. The serpent was revered by the ancient Greeks as having healing powers and combined with the Rod of Aesculapius has been recognised as the international symbol of medicine and healing since 1200BC.

== List of structures ==
2nd Medical Brigade (2007)

2nd Medical Brigade, at Queen Elizabeth Barracks, Strensall

- 22nd Field Hospital, Royal Army Medical Corps, at Thornhill Barracks, Aldershot Garrison
- 34th Field Hospital, Royal Army Medical Corps, at Queen Elizabeth Barracks, Strensall
- 201st (Northern) Field Hospital, Royal Army Medical Corps (V), in Newcastle upon Tyne – paired with 34 Field Hospital
- 202nd (Midlands) Field Hospital, Royal Army Medical Corps (V), in Birmingham – paired with 22 Field Hospital
- 203rd (Welsh) Field Hospital, Royal Army Medical Corps (V), in Cardiff – paired with 33 Field Hospital
- 204th (North Irish) Field Hospital, Royal Army Medical Corps (V), in Belfast – paired with 34 Field Hospital
- 205th (Scottish) Field Hospital, Royal Army Medical Corps (V), in Glasgow – paired with 34 Field Hospital
- 207th (Manchester) Field Hospital, Royal Army Medical Corps (V), in Manchester – paired with 22 Field Hospital
- 208th (Liverpool) Field Hospital, Royal Army Medical Corps (V), in Liverpool – paired with 22 Field Hospital
- 212th (Yorkshire) Field Hospital, Royal Army Medical Corps (V), in Sheffield – paired with 34 Field Hospital
- 243rd (Wessex) Field Hospital, Royal Army Medical Corps (V), in Keynsham – paired with 33 Field Hospital
- 256th (City of London) Field Hospital, Royal Army Medical Corps (V), in Walworth, London – paired with 33 Field Hospital
- Central Volunteer Headquarters, Royal Army Medical Corps (V), at Queen Elizabeth Barracks, Strensall
  - 306th Hospital Support Regiment, Royal Army Medical Corps (V), at Queen Elizabeth Barracks, Strensall
  - 335th Medical Evacuation Regiment, Royal Army Medical Corps (V), at Queen Elizabeth Barracks, Strensall
  - Medical Manpower Pool
  - Specialist Surgical Team
  - Ambulance Train Group
  - Field Surgical Team
  - Field Medical Equipment Depot

2nd Medical Brigade (2012)

2nd Medical Brigade, at Queen Elizabeth Barracks, Strensall

- Medical Operational Support Group, Royal Army Medical Corps (V), at Queen Elizabeth Barracks, Strensall
- 22nd Field Hospital, Royal Army Medical Corps, at Duchess of Kent Barracks, Aldershot Garrison
- 33rd Field Hospital, Royal Army Medical Corps, at Fort Blockhouse, Gosport
- 34th Field Hospital, Royal Army Medical Corps, at Queen Elizabeth Barracks, Strensall
- 201st (Northern) Field Hospital, Royal Army Medical Corps (V), in Newcastle upon Tyne – paired with 34 Field Hospital
- 202nd (Midlands) Field Hospital, Royal Army Medical Corps (V), in Birmingham – paired with 22 Field Hospital
- 203rd (Welsh) Field Hospital, Royal Army Medical Corps (V), in Cardiff – paired with 33 Field Hospital
- 204th (North Irish) Field Hospital, Royal Army Medical Corps (V), in Belfast – paired with 34 Field Hospital
- 205th (Scottish) Field Hospital, Royal Army Medical Corps (V), in Glasgow – paired with 34 Field Hospital
- 207th (Manchester) Field Hospital, Royal Army Medical Corps (V), in Manchester – paired with 22 Field Hospital
- 208th (Liverpool) Field Hospital, Royal Army Medical Corps (V), in Liverpool – paired with 22 Field Hospital
- 212th (Yorkshire) Field Hospital, Royal Army Medical Corps (V), in Sheffield – paired with 34 Field Hospital
- 243rd (Wessex) Field Hospital, Royal Army Medical Corps (V), in Keynsham – paired with 33 Field Hospital
- 256th (City of London) Field Hospital, Royal Army Medical Corps (V), in Walworth, London – paired with 33 Field Hospital
- 306th Hospital Support Regiment, Royal Army Medical Corps (V), at Queen Elizabeth Barracks, Strensall
- 335th Medical Evacuation Regiment, Royal Army Medical Corps (V), at Queen Elizabeth Barracks, Strensall

2nd Medical Brigade (2021)

2nd Medical Brigade, at Queen Elizabeth Barracks, Strensall

- Medical Operational Support Group, Royal Army Medical Corps (V), at Queen Elizabeth Barracks, Strensall
- 22nd Field Hospital, Royal Army Medical Corps, at Duchess of Kent Barracks, Aldershot Garrison
- 34th Field Hospital, Royal Army Medical Corps, at Queen Elizabeth Barracks, Strensall
- 201st (Northern) Field Hospital, Royal Army Medical Corps (V), in Newcastle upon Tyne
- 202nd (Midlands) Field Hospital, Royal Army Medical Corps (V), in Birmingham
- 203rd (Welsh) Field Hospital, Royal Army Medical Corps (V), in Cardiff
- 204th (North Irish) Field Hospital, Royal Army Medical Corps (V), in Belfast
- 205th (Scottish) Field Hospital, Royal Army Medical Corps (V), in Glasgow
- 207th (Manchester) Field Hospital, Royal Army Medical Corps (V), in Manchester
- 208th (Liverpool) Field Hospital, Royal Army Medical Corps (V), in Liverpool
- 212th (Yorkshire) Field Hospital, Royal Army Medical Corps (V), in Sheffield
- 243rd (Wessex) Field Hospital, Royal Army Medical Corps (V), in Keynsham
- 256th (City of London) Field Hospital, Royal Army Medical Corps (V), in Walworth, London
- 306th Hospital Support Regiment, Royal Army Medical Corps (V), at Queen Elizabeth Barracks, Strensall
- 335th Medical Evacuation Regiment, Royal Army Medical Corps (V), at Queen Elizabeth Barracks, Strensall
- Central Reserve Headquarters, Royal Army Medical Corps (V), at Queen Elizabeth Barracks, Strensall
- Army Medical Services Training Centre, at Queen Elizabeth Barracks, Strensall

2nd Medical Group (2024)

2nd Medical Group, at Queen Elizabeth Barracks, Strensall

- 21st Multi-Role Medical Regiment, Royal Army Medical Service, at Queen Elizabeth Barracks, Strensall
- 22nd Multi-Role Medical Regiment, Royal Army Medical Service, at The Dale Barracks, Chester
- 202nd (Midlands) Multi-Role Medical Regiment, Royal Army Medical Service (V), in Birmingham
- 203rd (Welsh) Multi-Role Medical Regiment, Royal Army Medical Service (V), in Cardiff
- 206th (North West) Multi-Role Medical Regiment, Royal Army Medical Service (V), in Liverpool
- 210th (North Irish) Multi-Role Medical Regiment, Royal Army Medical Service (V), in Belfast
- 214th (North East) Multi-Role Medical Regiment, Royal Army Medical Service (V), in Newcastle upon Tyne
- 215th (Scottish) Multi-Role Medical Regiment, Royal Army Medical Service (V), in Glasgow
- 225th Medical Squadron (Independent), Royal Army Medical Service (V), in Fife
- 243rd (Wessex) Multi-Role Medical Regiment, Royal Army Medical Service (V), in Keynsham
- 254th (East of England) Multi-Role Medical Regiment, Royal Army Medical Service (V), in Cambridge
- 256th (London and South East) Multi-Role Medical Regiment, Royal Army Medical Service (V), in Walworth
- 306th Hospital Support Regiment, Royal Army Medical Service (V), at Queen Elizabeth Barracks, Strensall
- 335th Medical Evacuation Regiment, Royal Army Medical Service (V), at Queen Elizabeth Barracks, Strensall
- Medical Operations Support Unit, Royal Army Medical Service (V), at Queen Elizabeth Barracks, Strensall
