= Operation Trenton =

British UN mission in South Sudan

- Part of United Nations Mission in South Sudan
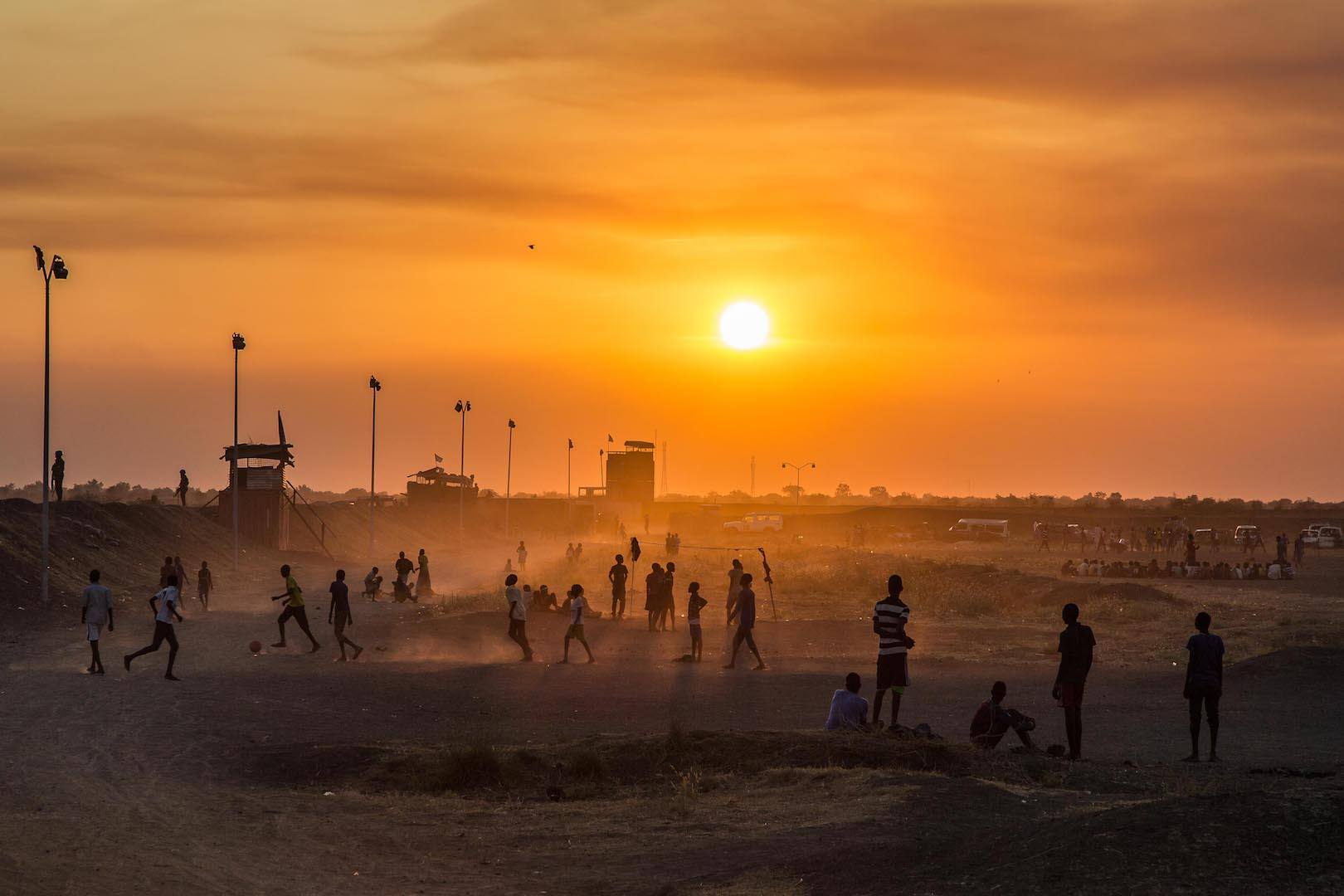
- The UN Compound in Malakal, South Sudan where members of the UK Engineer Task Force were deployed.
- Location: South Sudan
- Objective: Peace and stability in support of United Nations Mission in South Sudan.
- Date: May 2016 – January 2020
- Executed by: United Kingdom

Operation Trenton was the contribution of the United Kingdom in support of the United Nations Mission in South Sudan (UNMISS). It was one of the largest UK operational deployments at the time, with over 300 military personnel committed to it, based within two UN locations in Malakal and Bentiu. The operation consisted of an engineering task force, with the bulk of the units from the Royal Engineers, in addition to military medics, logisticians and force protection personnel. After four years, it ended with the construction of two hospitals and various upgrades to public infrastructure with several units receiving medals for their involvement.

== Background ==
In 2011, South Sudan gained independence from Sudan following 25 years of civil war. The United Nations Security Council announced that the situation represented a threat to international peace and security and established the United Nations Mission in South Sudan to bring about peace and conditions for development. The conflict escalated in 2013 due to clashes between the government and opposition forces and, as a result, 60% of the population experienced food insecurity, with 2.2 million out of its 13 million population becoming refugees and 1.9 million becoming internally displaced. In July 2019, there were 182,050 civilians in the six UN Protection of Civilian sites in South Sudan.

In September 2015, whilst attending a summit at the UN General Assembly, UK Prime Minister David Cameron announced that 300 British troops would be deployed to support the UN in South Sudan.

== Deployment ==
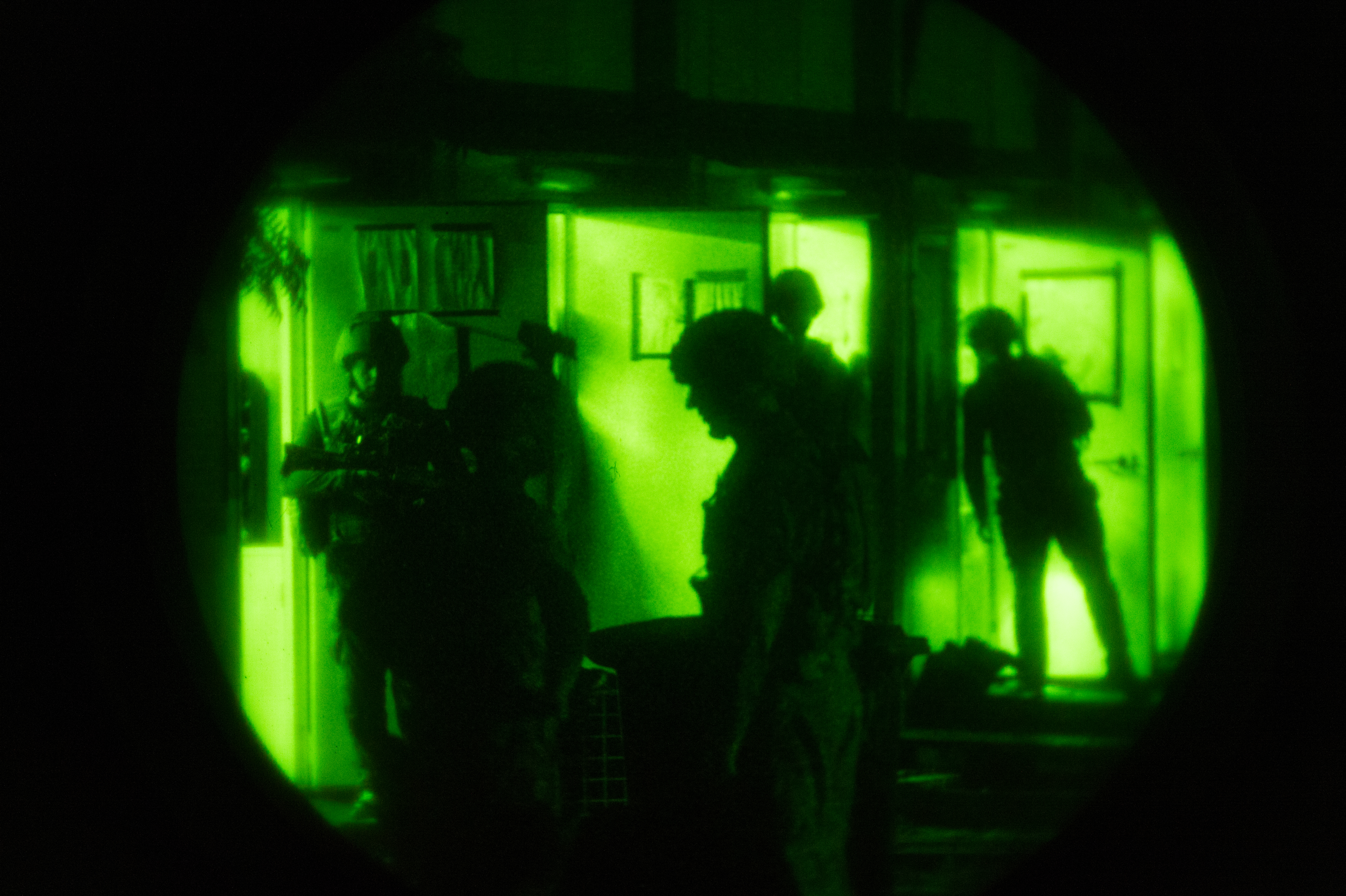
British troops deployed on Operation Trenton.

The deployment began in May 2016 with the UK Engineering Task Force operating in two UN locations; Malakal and Bentiu. The task force comprised 25 units, totaling up to 378 service personnel across all three services. In July 2017, a further 162 personnel were committed to the operation, bringing the total deployed to approximately 400. The UK Engineering Task Force assisted with the development of infrastructure, including roads which were vital to the delivery of humanitarian aid.

The units involved included:

- British Army
  - Royal Engineers
    - 21 Engineer Regiment
    - 32 Engineer Regiment
    - 36 Engineer Regiment
      - 69 Gurkha Field Squadron
    - 39 Engineer Regiment
    - 71 Engineer Regiment
    - 62 Works Group
  - Army Medical Services
    - Royal Army Medical Corps
      - 2 Medical Brigade
        - 335 Medical Evacuation Regiment
      - 16 Medical Regiment
  - The Rifles
  - Royal Logistic Corps
  - Royal Electrical and Mechanical Engineers
  - Royal Corps of Signals
  - Intelligence Corps
  - Royal Military Police
  - Brigade of Gurkhas
  - Mercian Regiment
  - Irish Guards
- Royal Air Force
  - Royal Air Force Medical Service
- Royal Navy
  - Royal Navy Medical Service

== Conclusion ==
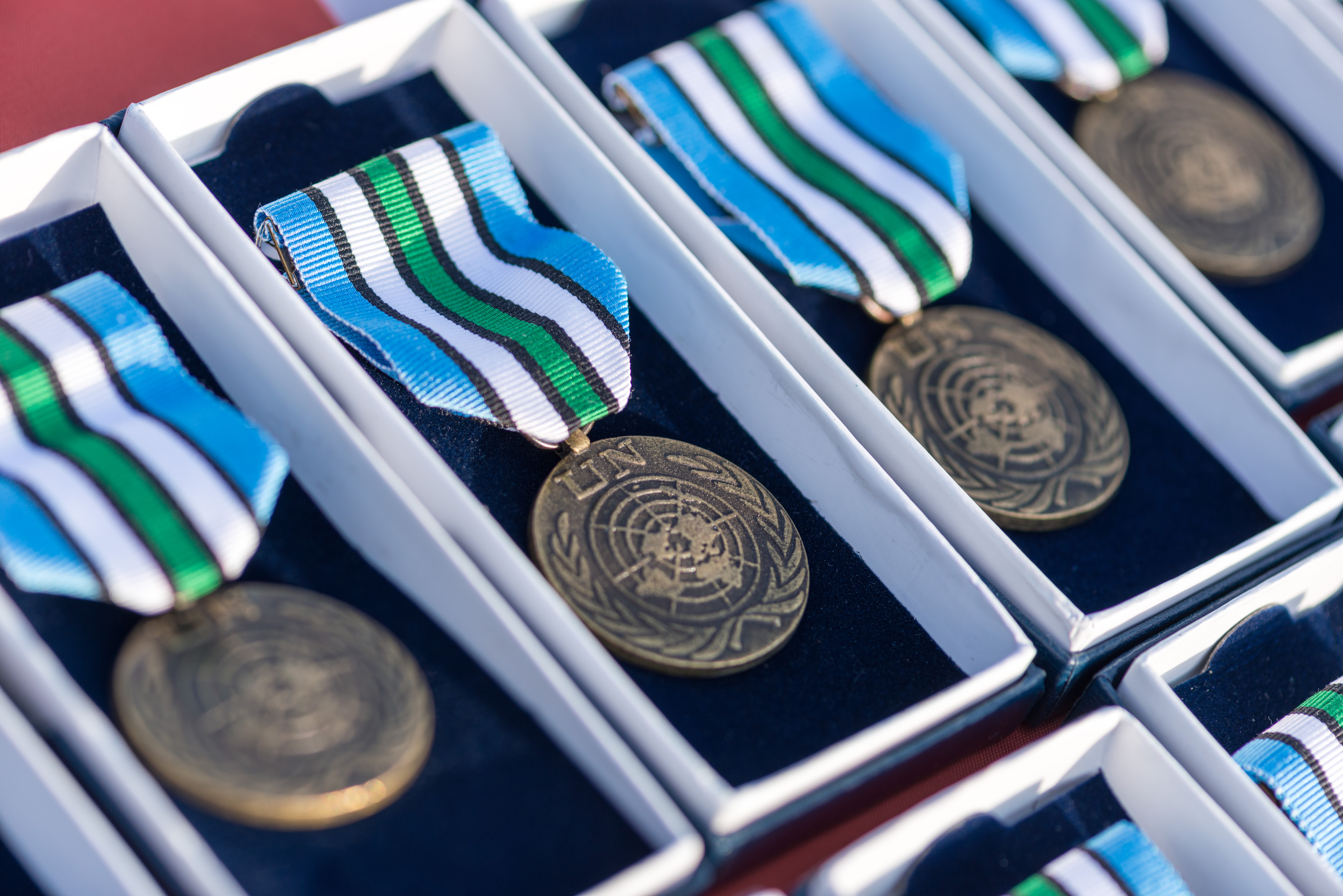
Operation Trenton medals

The operation began winding down in January 2020, four years after it first began. It had resulted in the construction of two hospitals, as well as upgrades to schools, prisons, roads and bridges. Minister for the Armed Forces Anne-Marie Trevelyan praised the "professionalism and skill" of British service personnel, adding "Everyone I’ve met here, from politicians to UN officials have only the highest praise for the work of our armed forces in South Sudan". 160 members of 39 Engineer Regiment were awarded service medals. The UK Engineering Task Force completed its final tour of duty in March 2020. 36 Engineer Regiment were awarded the Firmin Sword of Peace partly due to their role in the operation.
