= Land Forces Troops =

Grouping of British Army units

Field Army Troops Land Forces Troops
- Active: 1 April 2008 – 2012; 2022 – Present
- Country: United Kingdom
- Branch: British Army
- Part of: Land Forces Command
- Field Army HQ: Marlborough Lines, Andover

Land Forces Troops (previously called Field Army Troops until March 2026) is a formation of the British Army under direct control of Land Forces Command. Its purpose is to "centrally command high-demand, low-volume capabilities."

== 2019 reorganisation ==
In 2019, under the Field Army Reorganisation Plan (FARP), the role of Deputy Commander, Field Army was expanded with the moving of several commands and formations (by 2021) coming under direct control of CFA. Those units included the following:

- Land Operations Command, at Trenchard Lines, Upavon
- Land Warfare Centre, HQ at Waterloo Lines, Warminster Garrison
- 16 Air Assault Brigade, HQ at Merville Barracks, Colchester Garrison
- Collective Training Group (also Training Branch, Field Army) (Note: The Collective Training Group is a 1-star command (Brigade-sized) which provides collective training for Commander Field Army.), at Warminster Garrison
- Field Training Unit (Note: The Field Training Unit is a 1-star command (brigade equivalent) which provides training for the Field Army's light and mechanised battlegroups)

== Future Soldier reorganisation ==
On 25 November 2021, the Future Soldier programme was announced, which is due to be completed by 2030 and will reorganise the British Army from bottom to top. The role of "Field Army Troops" has been described as follows: "Field Army Troops – will centrally command high-demand, low-volume capabilities."

Under the new programme, the name 'Field Army Troops' was re-established, but was later renamed to Land Forces Troops in March 2026, upon the Field Army being renamed to Land Forces Command.

== Structure ==
=== Headquarters, Land Forces Troops ===
- Surveillance Group
- Understand Group
- Cyber and Electro-Magnetic Activities Effects Group
- Land Warfare Centre
- Land Special Operations Force
- 11th Brigade
