= 12th Signal Brigade =

Former military communications unit of the British Army

12th Signal Group 12th Signal Brigade
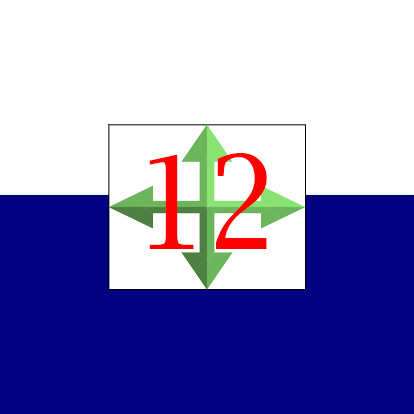
- Brigade patch
- Active: 1967–1992; 2004–2009
- Country: United Kingdom
- Branch: British Army
- Role: Military communications
- Size: Group & Brigade
- Brigade Headquarters (to 1992): Duke of York's Headquarters, Chelsea, London
- Group Headquarters (from 2004): Beacon Barracks, Stafford

Insignia
- Cap badge of the Royal Corps of Signals

- Royal Corps of Signals TRF

The 12th Signal Brigade, later 12th Signal Group was a military communications formation of the British Army commanding regiments of the Royal Corps of Signals. Initially formed in 1967, the brigade would provide rear defence communications for the British Army of the Rhine until its disbandment in 1992. In 2004, the group was reformed to provide territorial army and rear support to the Allied Rapid Reaction Corps in Germany. However, in 2009 the group was disbanded following reductions to the Royal Corps of Signals and Territorial Army.

== History ==
=== First Formation ===
Before the 1966 Defence White Paper and subsequent wide-ranging reorganisation of the Army, signal formations larger than those controlled by a Lieutenant Colonel (i.e.: battalion (regiment in the RCS)) were created. Within the Royal Corps of Signals, eight new 'signal groups', commanded by a Colonel, were formed to oversee specialist units with specific duties, including those tasked with supporting the British Army of the Rhine (BAOR). Among these was the 12th Signal Group, which undertook rear area duties within the BAOR.

A year after the 1966 Defence White Paper, on 1 April 1967, the 12th Signal Group (Volunteers) was formed with its headquarters initially at Erskine Barracks in Wilton. The regiments of the group were tasked with providing support to the logistic units in the rear area of supporting I (BR) Corps in West Germany. Additionally, the group providing rear area duties assistance to the corps. The role of the group was described as follows: "to establish and operate telecommunication connections in the Rear Combat Zone and the Communications Zone".

Eventually, the brigade's headquarters moved from Wilton to the Duke of York's Headquarters in Chelsea, London, where it remained until the brigade's disbandment.

Following the 1981 Defence White Paper, the Territorial Army was given roles of increased priority, and more emphasis was placed on supporting BAOR. As a consequence of this announcement, the Army reorganised many of its old 'Field Forces' and 'Groups' (renamed as such under the 1975 Mason Review), as 'Brigades'. Thus, on 1 January 1982, 12th Signal Group (V) became 12th Signal Brigade (Volunteers).

According to the 1988 Staff Officers' handbook, each regiment had an established strength of appx. 600 personnel. The brigade headquarters totalled around 100 personnel, and 81 Squadron had 100 personnel, leaving a total of 2,000 personnel for the brigade.

Following the Dissolution of the Soviet Union and subsequent End of the Cold War, the Options for Change defence review was announced. Among the massive changes was the wholescale disbandment of many units based in the United Kingdom. Under this review, the 12th Signal Brigade was disbanded on 13 November 1992.

=== Second Formation ===
Following the Future Army Structure changes announced in 2004, as a supplement to the 2003 Defence White Paper, the 11th Signal Brigade would expand from just three regiments in 2004 to six regiments by 2007. On 1 April 2004, the TA regiments equipped with the PTARMIGAN communications system of 11th Signal Brigade (33rd (Lancashire & Cheshire), 34th (Northern), and 35th (South Midlands) Signal Regiments) were grouped into the 12th Signal Group. 12th Signal Group's commander was the deputy commander of 11th Signal Brigade, and was first appointed in 2004. Shortly after formation, the group transferred to 1st (United Kingdom) Signal Brigade providing rear trunk communications.

The group established its headquarters at Beacon Barracks in Stafford and oversaw the TA regiments within the brigade. The group's, and its regiments roles were now to provide support for CIS (Combat Information Systems), EW (Electronic Warfare), and ARRC rear support to Land Forces (established in 2008). Because of their unique role, the group's regiments were equipped with the state-of-the-art, but expensive Ptarmigan communications system.

The new group, however, was only short-lived as in 2009, a 'supplement' to the Future Army Structure was provided. In addition, a reorganisation of the Reserves was announced in 2009, and the Royal Corps of Signals would face the majority of the cuts. As a cost saving measure, the 12th Signal Group with its three regiments (33rd, 34th, and 35th), in addition to several other regiments: 31st, 36th, 38th, and 40th Signal Regiments would all disbanded. As a result, in late 2009, the group headquarters was disbanded and its regiments reduced to squadrons, and in turn their squadrons became signal troops. As part of the review, the 33rd, 34th, and 35th had their equipment 're-allocated [those resources to] higher defence priorities".

== Organisation ==
=== First Formation ===
Following the reorganisation of the Army under the 1966 Defence White Paper, each regiment in the group consisted of a regimental headquarters, headquarter(s) squadron, three signal squadrons, and an attach light aid detachment (LAD) – company sized, commanded by a Major – provided by the Royal Electrical and Mechanical Engineers (REME).

initially, all the regiments were equipped with the C41/R222 communications system, however in 1987 these regiments were re-equipped with the new EUROMUX system. 56 Signal Squadron meanwhile was equipped with the VRC333/BID860 RATT communications system and would be based in the Lines of Communications (between the Channel Ports & Belgium). 81 Signal Squadron provided maintenance work and installation of the STARNET system at RAF airfields in Germany alongside 16th and 21st Signal Regiments.

- 12th Signal Group/Brigade
  - Group Headquarters, at the Duke of York's Headquarters, Chelsea, London
  - 34th (Northern) Signal Regiment, Royal Corps of Signals (V), RHQ in Middlesbrough – on mobilisation to provide communications between the Channel Ports and the rear boundary of 1st British Corps
  - 36th (Eastern) Signal Regiment, Royal Corps of Signals (V), RHQ in Wanstead – providing communications support to 1st British Corps
  - 40th (Ulster) Signal Regiment, Royal Corps of Signals (V), RHQ in Belfast – providing communication support to 1st British Corps
  - 56 Signal Squadron, Royal Corps of Signals (V), in Eastbourne – providing communications between the Channel Ports and the Belgium.
  - 81 Signal Squadron, Royal Corps of Signals (V), in Middlesbrough – initially known as 81 (Northern Ireland) Signal Squadron until 1972, then transferred to Middlesbrough from Belfast under 40th Signal Regiment and made independent. providing air formation signal communications support at RAF Airfields in Germany.

=== Second Formation ===
Following the 2003 Defence White Paper, the 33rd, 34th, and 35th Signal Regiments were all equipped with the PTARMIGAN communications system, which their regular counterparts had been equipped with in Germany.

- 12th Signal Group
  - Group Headquarters, at Beacon Barracks, Stafford
  - 33rd (Lancashire and Cheshire) Signal Regiment, Royal Corps of Signals (V), RHQ in Huyton, Liverpool – providing communications support for the Allied Rapid Reaction Corps
  - 34th (Northern) Signal Regiment, Royal Corps of Signals (V), RHQ in Middlesbrough – provides theatre-level communications support for the Allied Rapid Reaction Corps
  - 35th (South Midland) Signal Regiment, Royal Corps of Signals (V), RHQ in Coventry – provides rear area communications in Europe, supporting Allied Rapid Reaction Corps

== Commanders ==
Commanders of the brigade/group have included:

- April 1967 – December 1968: Brigadier Peter D. Vaigncourt-Strallen
- December 1968 – June 1971: Brigadier Arthur J. Jackson
- June 1971 – August 1972: Brigadier Henry Arthur John Sturge
- August 1972 – October 1974: Brigadier Oliver J. Peck
- October 1974 – January 1978: Brigadier William A. Sykes
- January 1978 – February 1981: Brigadier Ronald L. Stonham
- February 1981 – July 1984: Brigadier John R. Burrows
- July 1984 – May 1988: Brigadier Thomas H. Wheawell
- May 1988 – October 1990: Brigadier Stanley G. McK. Gordon
- October 1990 – November 1992: Brigadier K. P. Burke
