= Erskine Barracks =

- Fugglestone St Peter
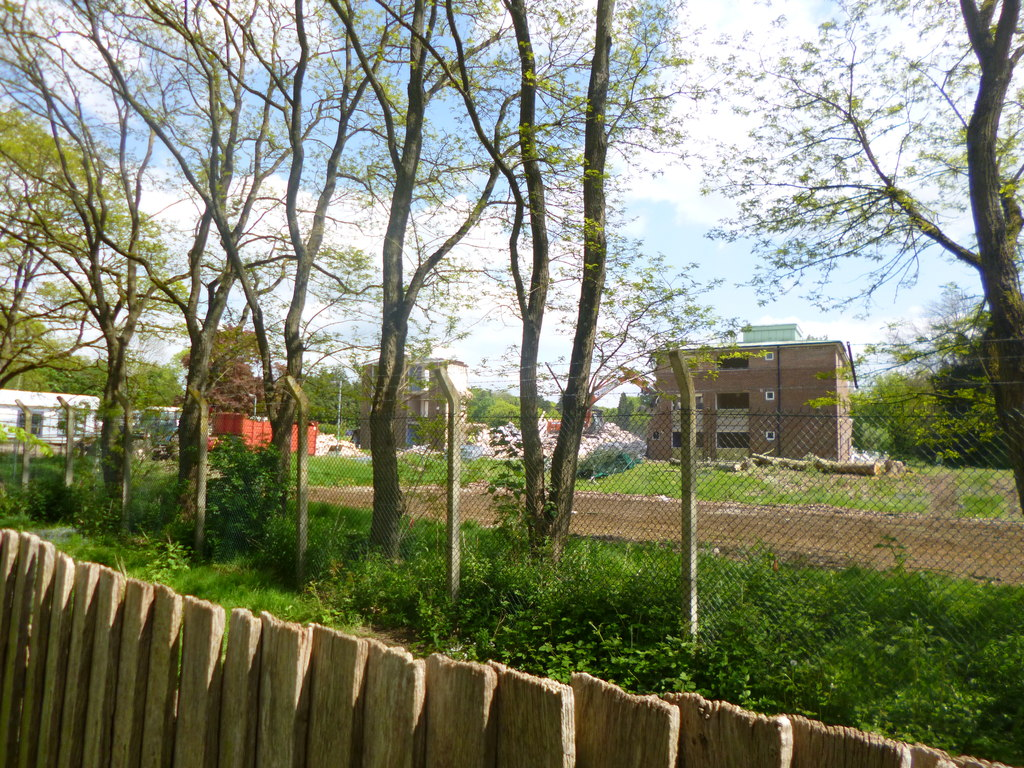
- Erskine Barracks undergoing demolition

Site information
- Type: Barracks
- Owner: Ministry of Defence
- Operator: British Army

Location
- Location within Wiltshire
- Coordinates: 51°5′13″N 01°51′5″W

Site history
- Built: 1949
- Built for: War Office
- In use: 1949-2010

Garrison information
- Occupants: Headquarters Land Forces

Erskine Barracks was a military installation at Fugglestone St Peter, in Wilton parish some 2 3/4 miles (4 km) northwest of Salisbury in Wiltshire, England.

== History ==
The site, which had been farmland until used for temporary army buildings during World War II, was acquired by the British Army for use as a headquarters for Southern Command in 1949. The establishment was centred on Fugglestone Farmhouse and an Ordnance Survey map of 1958 labels it as Fugglestone Camp.

The barracks were later named after General Sir George Erskine, who had been GOC Southern Command from 1955 until his retirement in 1958. The site went on to become in 1968 the headquarters of Army Strategic Command, which was renamed UK Land Forces in 1972 and Land Command in 1995. On 1 April 2008 Land Command amalgamated with Headquarters Adjutant General under 'Project Hyperion' and became Land Forces. Land Forces moved from Erskine Barracks to the former RAF Andover site now known as Marlborough Lines on 23 June 2010, and the site became vacant.

At time, that the site covered 9.6 hectares to the north of the railway line and 3.8 hectares (less fully developed) to the south. The former farmhouse had been demolished by 1968 and all standing structures were from 1950 or later. In 2014 the headquarters building was described as "an impressive example of brutal modernism".

== Post-Army use ==
The site was sold to housebuilder Redrow in March 2013, and all its buildings were demolished in 2014. Besides housing, the site has Erskine House which provides 44 flats for former military personnel, and offers training for their return to civilian work.

== Legacy ==
The National Army Museum has a Bath stone fireplace salvaged during the demolition in 2001 of Bridge End House, a building of c.1900 used as an administrative block by the Army.

During demolition in 2014, a photographic record of selected buildings – including the Sergeants' Mess and the Headquarters – was made by Wessex Archaeology to form a historic building record, as required by Wiltshire Council under a planning condition. No archaeological features were found during a simultaneous watching brief.
