= Deysbrook Barracks =

Coordinates: 53°26′5.3″N 2°53′19.3″W

Deysbrook Barracks was a regular army barracks in West Derby in Liverpool. The barracks was used by 59th (Volunteers) Signal Squadron of the Royal Signals until around 2000.

== Today ==
The last remains of the barracks are a few houses that were part of the quarters.
