= Army Headquarters (United Kingdom) =

Headquarters of the British Army

Coordinates: 51.20909°N 1.52157°W

- Active: 2011–present
- Country: United Kingdom
- Branch: British Army
- Type: Headquarters
- Location: Marlborough Lines, Andover, Hampshire

Commanders
- Current commander: General Sir Roland Walker

Army Headquarters is a British Army organisation based at Marlborough Lines, Hampshire. It is the name given to the staff supporting the Chief of the General Staff, currently General Sir Roland Walker. However, a significant staff remains at Ministry of Defence Main Building, in Whitehall.

The equivalent in the Royal Navy is Navy Command Headquarters at Portsmouth, and the equivalent in the Royal Air Force is Headquarters Air Command at High Wycombe.

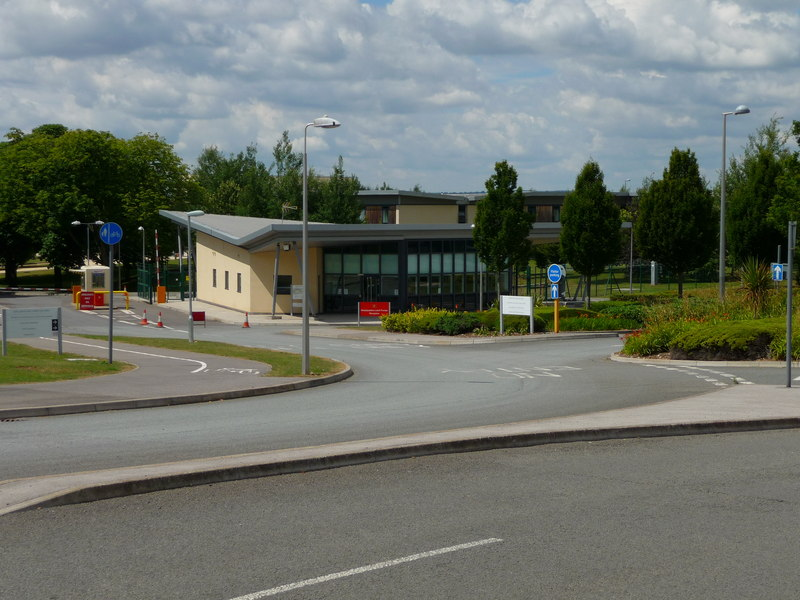
Entrance to Army Headquarters

== History ==
Until 31 October 2011, British Army field forces were commanded by a four-star general titled Commander-in-Chief, Land Forces. Under a major army reorganisation effective 1 November 2011, the Chief of the General Staff took direct command of the Army through a new structure known as Army Headquarters. Army Headquarters, which started to take responsibility for more than 2,000 military and civilian personnel, was established at Marlborough Lines near Andover.

The two main buildings constructed at Marlborough Lines were named as Blenheim (named after the Battle of Blenheim in 1704) and Ramillies (named after the Battle of Ramillies in 1706).

Functions established at Marlborough Lines include elements of Home Command as well as Headquarters Field Army.

== Structure ==
The British Army is commanded by the Chief of the General Staff. Under the Army 2020 Refine command structure, four lieutenant-general posts report to the Chief of the General Staff: Deputy Chief of the General Staff, Commander Field Army, Commander Home Command and Commander Allied Rapid Reaction Corps. Commander Joint Helicopter Command, now Commander Joint Aviation Command, was added to the list around September 2020.

On formation of Army Headquarters in 2011, those reporting to the Chief of the General Staff were: the Deputy Chief of the General Staff, the Commander Land Forces, the Adjutant-General to the Forces and the Commander Force Development and Capability. At that time the Commander Land Forces was responsible for generating and preparing forces for current and contingency operations, the Adjutant-General for developing the Army's personnel policies, recruiting and supporting its people, and the Commander Force Development and Capability for developing its capability, sustainability and doctrine.

In 2026 the newly appointed DCGS was described as taking responsibilities as "personnel lead for the Army, and [would also] enhance the relationship between the Army, Industry, and the National Armaments Directorate." Thus over fifteen years, the responsibilities of the Adjutant-General have been subsumed into the DCGS's role.
