= Marlborough Lines =

British Army installation

- Near Andover in England
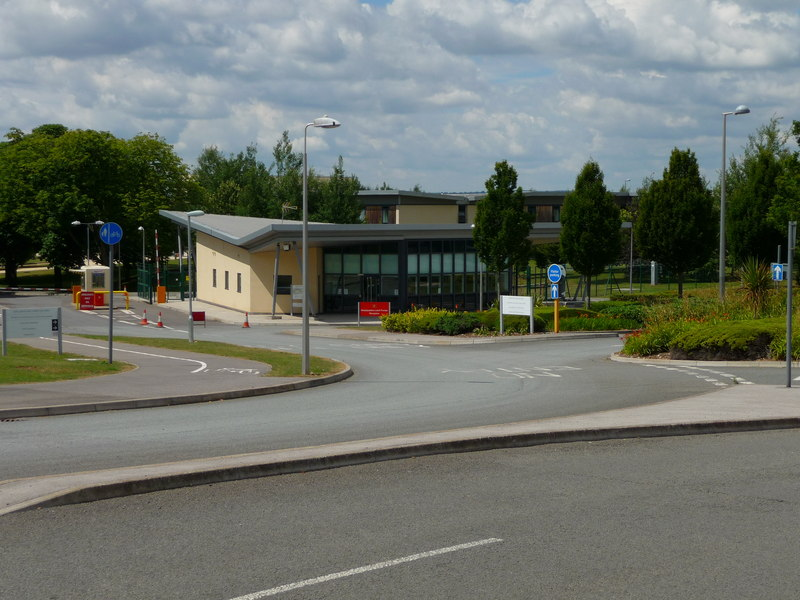

Site information
- Type: Headquarters
- Owner: Ministry of Defence
- Operator: British Army

Location
- Shown within Hampshire
- Coordinates: 51°12′31″N 001°31′31″W

Site history
- Built: 2009
- In use: 2009-present

Garrison information
- Garrison: Army Headquarters

Airfield information
- Elevation: 78 metres (256 ft) AMSL
Helipads
Number	Length and surface
01	10 metres (33 ft) Concrete

Marlborough Lines is a British Army installation on the former site of RAF Andover in Hampshire, England.

The site is the location of Army Headquarters, the most senior headquarters in the British Army, led by the Chief of the General Staff, as well as Headquarters, Field Army Troops, Headquarters, Joint Aviation Command, and Headquarters, 1st Military Police Brigade, led by the Provost Marshal (Army).

== History ==
Marlborough Lines was built on the former airfield of RAF Andover, on the western outskirts of the town of Andover, which had been established in 1917 and closed in 2009. The site was renamed Marlborough Lines in honour of John Churchill, the 1st Duke of Marlborough, who has been described as Britain’s greatest-ever general.

The main buildings constructed at Marlborough Lines were named as Blenheim (named after the Battle of Blenheim in 1704), Sedgemoor (named after the Battle of Sedgemoor in 1685) and Ramillies (named after the Battle of Ramillies in 1706). The garden outside Blenheim is called the Churchill Garden.

In 2011, Army Headquarters was established at Marlborough Lines.

On 1 December 2014, Headquarters, 1st Military Police Brigade was established, commanded by the Provost Marshal (Army), at Marlborough Lines.

The Army Families Federation's central office is also based in the Ramillies Building.
