= Force Troops Command =

Former combat support and combat service support command of the British Army

- Active: 1 April 2014 – 1 August 2019
- Branch: British Army
- Role: Combat Service Support
- Size: 8 brigades and 1 group
- Part of: Field Army
- Garrison/HQ: Trenchard Lines, Upavon

Commanders
- Current commander: Major General James Bowder

Force Troops Command was a combat support and combat service support command of the British Army. Its headquarters was at Upavon, Wiltshire. It was formed in 2013 as a re-designation of the previous Headquarters Theatre Troops. Force Troops Command was renamed as 6th (United Kingdom) Division in August 2019.

== History ==
Previously, General Officer Commanding, Theatre Troops was a senior British Army officer responsible for the provision of Combat Support and Combat Service Support operations worldwide in support of the UK's Defence Strategy. On formation in 2003 it included 1st Artillery Brigade; 7th Air Defence Brigade; Commander Royal Engineers (CRE) HQ RE Theatre Troops with 12th and 29th Engineer Brigades; 1st, 2nd, and 11th Signal Brigades; and two logistic brigades 102 Logistic Brigade in Germany and 101 Logistic Brigade in the United Kingdom which contained logistic units to support the two deployable divisions (1st Armoured Division in Germany and 3rd Mechanised Division in the United Kingdom). 104th Logistic Support Brigade with the specialist units needed to deploy a force overseas such as pioneers, movements and port units was also part of Theatre Troops. The final two components were 2 Medical Brigade and Commander, Equipment Support.

Theatre Troops became Force Troops Command under Army 2020 in 2013 and reached Full Operating Capability (FOC) on 1 April 2014. 101 or 102 Logistic Brigades subsequently left Force Troops Command.

The Joint Ground-Based Air Defence Command, which was jointly controlled by RAF Air Command, was replaced by 7 Air Defence Group on 1 April 2019.

Force Troops Command was renamed as 6th (United Kingdom) Division on 1 August 2019, with sub-units consisting of 1st Signal Brigade, 11th Signal Brigade, 1st Intelligence Surveillance and Reconnaissance Brigade, 77th Brigade and the Specialised Infantry Group. It will sit alongside restructured 1st UK Division and 3rd UK Division.

== Structure ==
=== Formation ===
Structure before Army 2020
- Headquarters, Theatre Troops, at Trenchard Lines, Upavon
  - 1st Military Intelligence Brigade, at Chicksands Station
    - 1st Military Intelligence Battalion, at Joint Headquarters Rheindahlen, Germany (supporting 1st (United Kingdom) Armoured Division)
    - 2nd Military Intelligence Battalion, at AAC Netheravon (Intelligence Exploitation)
    - 3rd Military Intelligence Battalion (TA), HQ in London (supporting HQ ARRC, Permanent Joint Headquarters, and Defence Intelligence Staff)
    - 4th Military Intelligence Battalion, at Ward Barracks, Bulford Camp (supporting 3rd (United Kingdom) Mechanised Division)
    - 5th Military Intelligence Battalion (TA), HQ in Edinburgh
    - 15 Psychological Operations Group, at the Chicksands Station (Joint Tri-Services)
  - 1st (United Kingdom) Signal Brigade, at Joint Headquarters Rheindahlen, Germany
    - 7th (Allied Rapid Reaction Corps) Signal Regiment, Royal Corps of Signals, at Javelin Barracks, Niederkrüchten
    - 16th Signal Regiment, Royal Corps of Signals, at Javelin Barracks, Niederkrüchten
    - Allied Rapid Reaction Corps Support Battalion, Royal Logistic Corps, at Ripon Lines, Joint Headquarters Rheindahlen
    - Royal Signals System Support Team (Germany)
  - 2nd (National Communications) Signal Brigade
    - 1 (Royal Buckinghamshire Yeomanry) Signal Squadron (Special Communications), Royal Corps of Signals (V), at John Howard Barracks, Bletchley
    - 2 (City of Dundee) Signal Squadron, Royal Corps of Signals (V), in Dundee
    - 10th Signal Regiment, Royal Corps of Signals, at Basil Hill Barracks, Corsham
    - 31st (City of London) Signal Regiment, Royal Corps of Signals (V), in London
    - 32nd (Scottish) Signal Regiment, Royal Corps of Signals (V), in Glasgow
    - 36th (Eastern) Signal Regiment, Royal Corps of Signals (V), in Ilford
    - 37th Signal Regiment, Royal Corps of Signals (V), at Kohima House, Redditch
    - 38th (City of Sheffield) Signal Regiment, Royal Corps of Signals (V), in Sheffield
    - 39th Signal Regiment (The Skinners), Royal Corps of Signals (V), in Bristol
    - 40th (Ulster) Signal Regiment, Royal Corps of Signals (V), in Belfast
    - 71st (City of London) Yeomanry Signal Regiment, Royal Corps of Signals (V), in Bexleyheath
    - Central Volunteer Headquarters, Royal Corps of Signals (V), at Basil Hill Barracks, Corsham
  - 11th Signal Brigade, at Venning Barracks, MoD Donnington
    - 2nd Signal Regiment, Royal Corps of Signals, at Imphal Barracks, York Garrison
    - 14th Signal Regiment (Electronic Warfare), Royal Corps of Signals, at Cawdor Barracks, Brawdy
    - 30th Signal Regiment, Royal Corps of Signals, at Gamecock Barracks, Bramcote Station
    - Unified Systems Support Organisation, at Venning Barracks, MoD Donnington
    - 12th Signal Group (V), at Beacon Barracks, Stafford
      - 33rd (Lancashire and Cheshire) Signal Regiment, Royal Corps of Signals (V), in Huyton, Liverpool
      - 34th (Northern) Signal Regiment, Royal Corps of Signals (V), in Middlesbrough
      - 35th (South Midland) Signal Regiment, Royal Corps of Signals (V), in Coventry
  - 1st Reconnaissance Brigade, at Trenchard Lines, Upavon
  - 1st Artillery Brigade, at AAC Netheravon
    - 5th Regiment, Royal Artillery, at Marne Barracks, Catterick Garrison (Surveillance and Target Acquisition)
    - 32nd Regiment, Royal Artillery, at Roberts Barracks, Larkhill Garrison (Mini UAS)
    - 39th Regiment, Royal Artillery, at Albemarle Barracks, Stamfordham (MLRS and MUAs) – supporting 3 UK Division
    - Honourable Artillery Company (V), at Finsbury Barracks, City of London (Forward Observation Posts)
    - 101st (Northumbrian) Regiment, Royal Artillery (V), HQ at Fenham Barracks, Newcastle upon Tyne (MLRS and MUAs)
    - Royal School of Artillery, at Stirling Barracks, Larkhill Garrison
      - 14th Regiment Royal Artillery, at Stirling Barracks, Larkhill Garrison
  - Joint Ground-Based Air Defence Headquarters, at RAF High Wycombe
    - 16th Regiment Royal Artillery, at St George's Barracks, North Luffenham (Air defence)
    - 22nd Regiment Royal Artillery, at Napier Barracks, Kirton in Lindsey (Air defence)
  - 8th Force Engineer Brigade, at Trenchard Lines, Upavon
    - Combat Information Systems (CIS) Troop, 8th Engineer Brigade, Royal Engineers (Army Reserve), at Aldershot Garrison
    - Central Volunteer Headquarters, Royal Engineers, at Gibraltar Barracks, Minley
    - 12 (Air Support) Engineer Group, at Waterbeach Barracks, Waterbeach
      - 20 Works Group (Air Support), Royal Engineers, at RAF Wittering (Hybrid) (Air, Aviation, and UAS tasks support.)
        - 510 Specialist Team (Airfields), Royal Engineers (Army Reserve)
      - 25th Engineer Regiment (Air Support), Royal Engineers, at Waterbeach Barracks, Cambridge
      - 39th Engineer Regiment (Air Support), Royal Engineers, at RAF Waterbeach
    - 29 (Explosive Ordnance Disposal and Search) Engineer Group, at Montgomery House, Aldershot Garrison
      - Brigade Headquarters and Signal Troop, Royal Corps of Signals (V), at Seely House, Aldershot Garrison
      - 29 (Explosive Ordnance Disposal and Search) Group Support Unit, at Carver Barracks, Wimbish
      - 33rd Engineer Regiment (Explosive Ordnance Disposal), Royal Engineers, at Carver Barracks, Wimbish
      - 101st (City of London) Engineer Regiment (Explosive Ordnance Disposal and Search), Royal Engineers, (V) HQ in Catford (EOD, Army Reserve) — paired with 33 Engineer Regiment
      - 11th Explosive Ordnance Disposal and Search Regiment, Royal Logistic Corps, at Vauxhall Barracks, Didcot
      - 1st Military Working Dog Regiment, Royal Army Veterinary Corps, at St George's Barracks, North Luffenham (Hybrid)
    - 170 (Infrastructure Support) Engineer Group, at Chetwynd Barracks, Chilwell
      - 62 Works Group, Royal Engineers
      - 63 Works Group, Royal Engineers
      - 64 Works Group, Royal Engineers
      - 65 Works Group, Royal Engineers (V)
  - 101st Logistic Brigade, at Saint Omer Barracks, Aldershot Garrison
    - 101st Logistic Brigade Headquarters and 261 Signal Squadron, Royal Corps of Signals, at Saint Omer Barracks, Aldershot Garrison
    - 604 (Aldershot) Signal Troop, Royal Corps of Signals
    - 661 Signal Troop, Royal Corps of Signals, at Aldershot Garrison
    - 9th Regiment Royal Logistic Corps, at Buckley Barracks, Hullavington
    - 10th (Queen's Own Gurkha) Logistic Regiment, Royal Logistic Corps, at Roman Barracks, Colchester Garrison
    - 27th Regiment, Royal Logistic Corps, at Travers Barracks, Aldershot Garrison
    - 225th (Scottish) Medical Regiment, Royal Army Medical Corps (V), in Edinburgh
    - 4th General Support Medical Regiment, Royal Army Medical Corps, at Keogh Barracks, Aldershot Garrison
    - 4th Regiment Royal Military Police, at Arnhem Barracks, Aldershot Garrison
    - 101 Military Working Dog Support Unit, Royal Army Veterinary Corps, at Puckridge Barracks, Aldershot Garrison
  - 102nd Logistic Brigade, at Princess Royal Barracks, Gütersloh
    - 102nd Logistic Brigade Headquarters and 262 Signal Squadron, Royal Corps of Signals, at Princess Royal Barracks, Gütersloh
    - 6th Supply Regiment, Royal Logistic Corps, at Princess Royal Barracks, Gütersloh and Münster
    - 7th Regiment Royal Logistic Corps, at Catterick Barracks, Bielefeld
    - 8th Regiment Royal Logistic Corps, at Marne Barracks, Catterick Garrison
    - 5th General Support Medical Regiment, Royal Army Medical Corps, at Fulwood Barracks, Preston
    - 254th (City of Cambridge) Medical Regiment, Royal Army Medical Corps (V), in Cambridge
    - 5th Regiment Royal Military Police, at Princess Royal Barracks, Gütersloh
    - 102 Military Working Dog Support Unit, Royal Army Veterinary Corps, in Sennelager
  - 104th Logistic Support Brigade, at Prince William of Gloucester Barracks, Grantham
    - 17th Port and Maritime Regiment, Royal Logistic Corps, at McMullen Barracks, Marchwood
    - 23rd Pioneer Regiment, Royal Logistic Corps, at Saint David's Barracks, Bicester Garrison
    - 29th Postal, Courier, and Movements Regiment, Royal Logistic Corps, at Duke of Gloucester Barracks, South Cerney
    - 88th Postal and Courier Regiment, Royal Logistic Corps (V), at Prince William of Gloucester Barracks, Grantham
    - Catering Support Regiment, Royal Logistic Corps (V), at Prince William of Gloucester Barracks, Grantham
  - 2nd Medical Brigade, at Queen Elizabeth Barracks, Strensall
    - Central Volunteer Headquarters, Army Medical Services (V)
    - 22nd Field Hospital, Royal Army Medical Corps, at Keogh Barracks, Aldershot Garrison
    - 34th Field Hospital, Royal Army Medical Corps, at Queen Elizabeth Barracks, Strensall
    - 201st (Northern) Field Hospital, Royal Army Medical Corps (V), at Fenham Barracks, Newcastle upon Tyne
    - 202nd (Midlands) Field Hospital, Royal Army Medical Corps (V), in Birmingham
    - 203rd (Welsh) Field Hospital, Royal Army Medical Corps (V), in Cardiff
    - 204th (North Irish) Field Hospital, Royal Army Medical Corps (V), in Belfast
    - 205th (Scottish) Field Hospital, Royal Army Medical Corps (V), in Glasgow
    - 207th (Manchester) Field Hospital, Royal Army Medical Corps (V), in Manchester
    - 208th (Liverpool) Field Hospital, Royal Army Medical Corps (V), in Liverpool
    - 212th (Yorkshire) Field Hospital, Royal Army Medical Corps (V), in Sheffield
    - 243rd (The Wessex) Field Hospital, Royal Army Medical Corps (V), in Keynsham, Bristol
    - 256th (City of London) Field Hospital, Royal Army Medical Corps (V), in London
    - 306th Field Hospital, Royal Army Medical Corps (V), at Queen Elizabeth Barracks, Strensall
    - 335th Medical Evacuation Regiment, Royal Army Medical Corps (V), at Queen Elizabeth Barracks, Strensall
    - Army Medical Services Manpower Pool (V), at Queen Elizabeth Barracks, Strensall

=== Largest ===
Force Troops Command comprised nine ‘functional’ brigades. The various units included: The Intelligence and Surveillance Brigade which provided integrated intelligence surveillance and reconnaissance capabilities, drawing specifically on lessons from Afghanistan. 1st Artillery Brigade delivered both close support artillery and precision fires, as well as leading Air-Land Integration. The 8 Engineer Brigade commanded the close support engineer units, as well as Explosive Ordnance Disposal and Search, Force Support and Infrastructure Groups. The 77th Brigade was involved in conflict prevention and stabilisation through the projection of soft power.

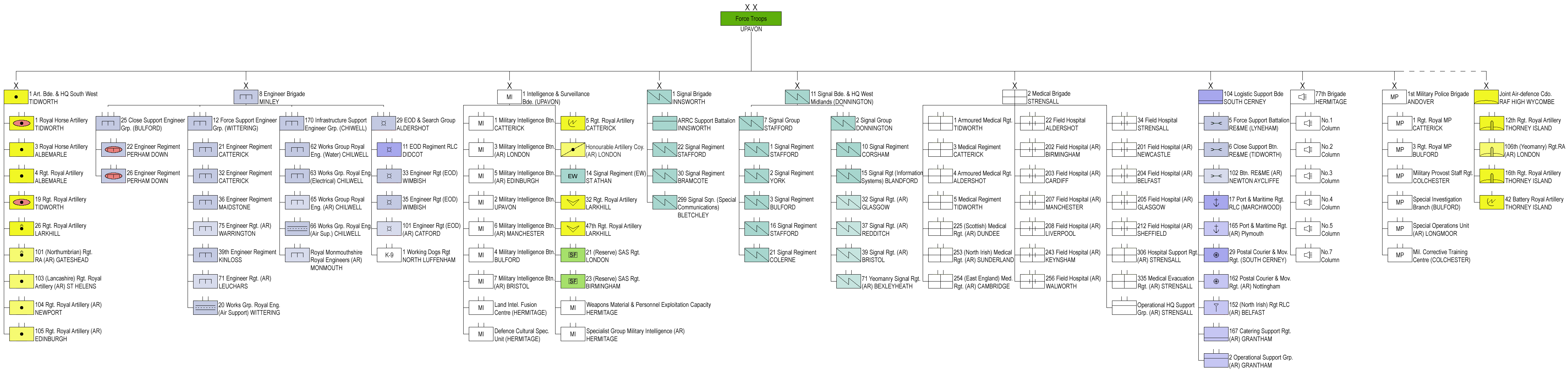
Structure of the Force Troops Command 2018 (click image to enlarge)

== Commanders ==
Commanders have included:
General Officer Commanding, Theatre Troops

- 2001–2004 Major General James Shaw
- 2004–2006 Major General Tim Cross
- 2006–2008 Major General Hamish Rollo
- 2008–2011 Major General Bruce Brealey
- 2011–2013 Major General Shaun Burley

General Officer Commanding, Force Troops Command

- 2013–2015 Major General Tim Radford
- 2015–2017 Major General Tyrone Urch
- 2017–2019 Major General Tom Copinger-Symes
- July 2019–August 2019 Major General James Bowder
