= Tim Cross =

Army officer (born 1951)

Major General Tim Cross CBE
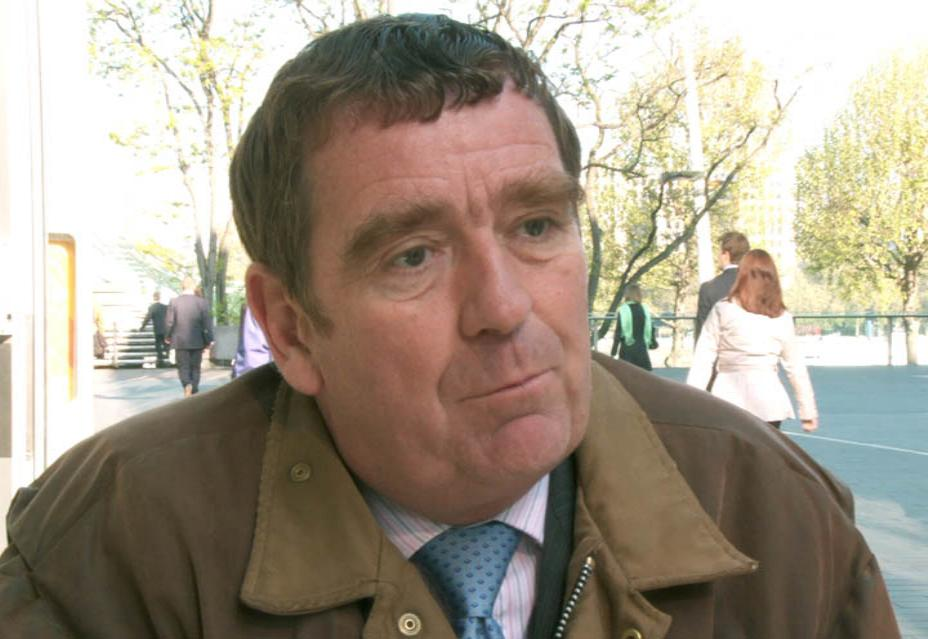
- Tim Cross in May 2009
- Born: 19 April 1951 (age 75)
- Military career
- Allegiance: United Kingdom
- Branch: British Army
- Service years: 1971–2007
- Rank: Major General
- Units: Royal Army Ordnance Corps; Royal Logistic Corps
- Commands: 1 Ordnance Battalion; 101 Logistic Brigade; General Officer Commanding, Theatre Troops, Iraq
- Conflicts: The Troubles; Gulf War; Kosovo War; Iraq War
- Awards: Commander of the Order of the British Empire
- Other work: Army Advisor, Defence Select Committee; Defence and security consultant Lecturer

Major General Timothy Cross, CBE (born 19 April 1951) is a retired British Army officer and military logistics expert. He was commissioned in 1971 into the Royal Army Ordnance Corps and went on to serve in Germany, Northern Ireland and Cyprus, interspersed with staff duties and further education. He was posted to Paris in 1984, where he was involved in the development of the MILAN anti-tank weapon, before returning to his regiment as a company commander. He took command of 1 Ordnance Battalion in 1990 and was tasked with running logistics for 1st Armoured Division during the Gulf War. He went on to serve as Commander, Logistic Support for 3rd Infantry Division in 1992.

Cross served his first of three tours in the Balkans, attached to the Implementation Force (IFOR), in 1995–1996. His second was in 1997, with the Stabilisation Force (SFOR), where he commanded 101 Logistic Brigade, and his third in 1999 with the Kosovo Force (KFOR). During his tour with KFOR, he was responsible for co-ordinating multinational troops and civilian agencies in establishing refugee camps in the aftermath of the Kosovo War. He was later appointed a Commander of the Order of the British Empire (CBE) for his service with KFOR. Cross was promoted to major general (two-star rank in NATO terms) in 2000 and served as Director General, Defence Supply Chain until 2002, when he became involved in planning for the forthcoming invasion of Iraq. He was the most senior British officer involved in the planning and in the Coalition Provisional Authority.

His last command was as General Officer Commanding, Theatre Troops, Iraq. Since retiring from the Army in 2007, Cross has been critical of the planning for Iraq after the removal of Saddam Hussein's government, giving evidence to the Iraq Inquiry that he urged politicians to delay the invasion, and calling the post-war planning "woefully thin". He serves as an advisor to the House of Commons Defence Select Committee and to several private companies, and is a visiting lecturer at several British universities. A convert to Christianity, he is a licensed lay reader in the Church of England and affiliated with several Christian organisations. Cross is married, with three children.

== Early life ==
Cross is the son of Sidney George and Patricia Mary Cross. Having always wanted to be a soldier, he applied to join the Army at the age of fourteen, but was rejected due to his age. He joined the Army Cadet Force in 1964 and, after his secondary education, was accepted to study at Welbeck Defence Sixth Form College, before attending the Royal Military Academy Sandhurst in 1969.

== Early military career ==
Cross started at Sandhurst in 1969 and was commissioned into the Royal Army Ordnance Corps as a second lieutenant on 30 July 1971. His first tour was in West Germany, with the British Army of the Rhine (BAOR) in 1971, after which he undertook an in-service degree at the Royal Military College of Science. He was promoted to lieutenant in 1973. Having graduated as a Bachelor of Science in 1975, he served a tour with 22 Air Defence Regiment, Royal Artillery, with responsibility for the regiment's new Rapier missiles. Promoted to captain in 1977, he went on to train as an Ammunition Technical Officer (ATO) and was posted to Northern Ireland in 1978, where he was involved in explosive ordnance disposal along with inspection duties.

Returning to the BAOR in 1979, Cross served as Adjutant to 1 Ordnance Battalion, before a tour in Cyprus, attached to the United Nations peace-keeping force in 1981. He studied for an MSc in guided weapons at Staff College, Camberley from 1982 to 1983 and was promoted major on 30 September 1983. Between 1984 and 1985, he was posted to Paris as a British liaison to the MILAN anti-tank missile programme, after which he rejoined 1 Ordnance Battalion as the company commander of 12 Ordnance Company. He was promoted to lieutenant-colonel on 30 June 1988. Returning to Staff College, Camberley later that year as a member of the Directing Staff, he was heavily involved in the modernisation of the Command and Staff Course. In 1990, Cross returned again to Germany to take command of 1 Ordnance Battalion, in which he had previously been adjutant and a company commander, and, in a double-hatted post, was appointed Commander Supply, 1st Armoured Division. In the latter role, he was posted to Kuwait and later Iraq, as part of Operation Granby during the Gulf War.

After Iraq, Cross was appointed the first Commander, Logistic Support for 3rd Infantry Division in late 1992. During a re-organisation of the Army in 1993, the Royal Army Ordnance Corps was amalgamated to become part of the newly formed Royal Logistic Corps (RLC), into which Cross transferred and was promoted to colonel. Having completed the Higher Command and Staff Course earlier in 1995, he returned to 3rd Division and served in Bosnia as part of NATO's Implementation Force in 1995 and 1996.

== High command ==
Cross was promoted to brigadier on 30 June 1996. He was appointed Director, Materiel Supply and Distribution (Army), a post which became Director, Materiel Support (Army) in 1997 as a result of re-organisation, based in Andover, Hampshire. At the end of 1997, he took command of the British National Support Element in the Balkans, responsible for supplying the British contingent of the NATO-led Stabilisation Force (SFOR). At the same time, he commanded the Combat Service Support Group, later renamed 101 Logistic Brigade. He returned to the UK in April 1998, only to be told that he would be returning to the Balkans in January 1999 as part of the Kosovo Force (KFOR). In this role, he was responsible for the humanitarian effort in the aftermath of the Kosovo War, establishing and maintaining refugee camps in Macedonia and Albania. He was tasked with commanding multinational troops, as well as coordinating the humanitarian efforts of personnel from the British Department for International Development, United Nations High Commissioner for Refugees (UNHCR) and multiple non-governmental organisations. Speaking about his service with KFOR, he later called it a "challenging and demanding deployment" and "the first time that I have come face to face with a large-scale humanitarian crisis." He went on to say that the most challenging part was the military working alongside large numbers of civilian agencies and that the Army needed to learn how to better work with such organisations—a need he said was "widely recognised" outside the military. In recognition of his service in the Balkans, Cross was appointed Commander of the Order of the British Empire (CBE) in the 2000 New Year Honours List.

From January to August 2000, Cross attended the Royal College of Defence Studies, after which he was promoted to major general (two-star rank) and appointed Director General, Defence Supply Chain. While Director General, he was responsible for the establishment of the United Kingdom's Joint Force Logistic Component for the forthcoming operations in Iraq and became involved in planning for the invasion of the country. In early 2003, he became the British representative to the United States Department of Defense's Office for Reconstruction and Humanitarian Assistance, later the Coalition Provisional Authority following the invasion, and one of three deputies to American Lieutenant General Jay Garner.

Cross was involved in coordinating the reconstruction of the country following the fall of Saddam Hussein's government, and was the most senior British officer involved in post-war planning for the country. Shortly after the invasion of Iraq, he appeared on BBC Breakfast with Frost, speaking to presenter Peter Sissons about his role. He praised the military campaign and went on to talk about the challenges of rebuilding the country, saying "I think in relative terms we are not as badly off as we might have feared", but agreed that there were insufficient "people on the ground" to ensure security in the aftermath of the invasion and removal of Saddam Hussein's government. He was later deeply critical of the planning made for post-war Iraq, and stated that he attempted to raise the issue of insufficient planning with politicians. However, he was never "overly concerned" by warnings from aid agencies of a massive humanitarian crisis in the aftermath of the invasion which, in the event, never materialised, though he admitted he had been too optimistic about the state of the Iraqi infrastructure. In the Breakfast with Frost interview, he drew an analogy with London, "if you imagine going into London and every Ministry building is completely empty of furniture, completely empty of people, most of the windows blown out, just trying to find the people who work in those Ministries, the equivalent of the Home Office and [finding] out who worked there, getting them back to work, beginning to pay their salaries which we're now beginning to do, and encouraging them to come back and work with us is bound to take a bit of time."

Cross was given the honorary title of Colonel Commandant, Royal Logistic Corps, on 5 April 2003. On 9 October 2004, he was appointed General Officer Commanding, Theatre Troops. He retired from active service on 20 January 2007, retaining the honorary title of Colonel Commandant, Royal Logistic Corps, and, in April 2007, was given the further ceremonial appointment of Honorary Colonel, 168 Pioneer Regiment (Volunteers), Royal Logistic Corps.

== Retirement ==
Cross has lectured both in the UK and elsewhere since his retirement and is a visiting professor at several British universities including the University of Nottingham, University of Reading and Cranfield University. He serves as an advisor to a number of organisations. Since 2007, he has been army advisor to the House of Commons Defence Select Committee, as well as a defence advisor for Fujitsu and other companies. He is a non-executive chairman at Asuure Ltd, a British security company, and serves as a director at the Centre for International Humanitarian Cooperation and the Humanitarian International Services Group.

Following his retirement, Cross attacked US foreign policy on Iraq, calling the plans "fatally flawed" shortly after General Sir Mike Jackson—Chief of the General Staff at the time of the invasion and also recently retired—called the same plans "intellectually bankrupt". In a 2009 interview, Cross praised the planning for the invasion and the removal of Saddam Hussein, but said that he "was very keen that we thought through carefully the postwar aspects of what we were going to do once the military campaign was over. And I think it's now very public knowledge that that was not well handled. It was not well thought through, it was not well executed. And we lived with the consequences of that."

On 7 December 2009, Cross publicly testified before the Iraq Inquiry, having previously argued that the proceedings should be held in public as, eventually, they were. He gave evidence about the post-war planning done prior to the invasion of Iraq, stating that he had urged Prime Minister Tony Blair and his aide, Alastair Campbell, to delay the invasion two days prior to the beginning of the conflict. Cross told Sir John Chilcot, the inquiry chairman, that preparations for Iraq after the removal of Saddam Hussein were "woefully thin". He went on to tell the inquiry that "although I was confident that we would secure a military victory, I offered my view that we should not begin that campaign until we had a much more coherent postwar plan."

In an interview for The Independent in January 2010, Cross, speaking again about post-war Iraq, claimed "A lot of senior generals were frustrated that they didn't have sufficient resources", and singled out both Blair and Clare Short, Secretary of State for International Development at the time of the invasion, as well as criticising the system in which funding was allocated for the Iraq campaign.

== Christianity ==
Cross, a Christian, converted to Christianity while on leave from a posting to Cyprus in 1981. He visited Jerusalem over the Easter weekend and was inspired by a retired British Army officer he met there to convert. After converting, he considered leaving the Army, but has said in interviews that he reconciled his beliefs with his military service, contending that "the British Army as a community [...] recognises the issue of spirituality and goodness and righteousness and justice and evil and wrong probably far more than most".

He is a licensed lay minister in the Church of England, serving at St Paul's Church, Camberley, in the Diocese of Guildford. He is also involved with a number of Christian organisations, including as a trustee of the British and Foreign Bible Society and a former president of the Armed Forces Christian Union. In an interview for the Christian Broadcasting Network in 2009, he said "The moral component of fighting power is about leadership, it's about ethics, it's about culture, it's about how do you get people to fight and embedded within that is an element of justice and righteousness. [I]f you lose the moral component, you lose everything. I think we – collectively in the West – have gone through 30–40 years really of pretending that this moral component is not important, and that I don't need to have a biblical foundation in my life. And I challenge that." He has written on the subject in the British Army Review, an in house publication aimed at generating professional debate, where he described ideas of a secular Army as 'tripe' and 'dangerously wrong' and the rewrite of the motto of the Girl Guides, removing reference to God, as 'vapid and anodyne'.

== Personal life ==
He married Christine in 1972. The couple live in Surrey and have two sons—one of whom served in the Royal Navy—one daughter and five grandchildren. Cross lists his interests as golf, sailing, walking, reading and writing—having written chapters and introductions for several books and papers.

Military offices
Preceded by James Shaw	General Officer Commanding, Theatre Troops; 2004–2006	Succeeded by Hamish Rollo
