= General Rollo =

General Rollo may refer to:

- Andrew Rollo, 5th Lord Rollo (1703–1765), British Army brigadier general
- Bill Rollo (fl. 1970s–2010s), British Army lieutenant general
- Hamish Rollo (1955–2009), British Army major general
