= General Shaw =

General Shaw may refer to:

- Anthony Shaw (British Army officer) (1930–2015), British Army major general
- Charles Shaw (British Army officer) (1794—1871), British Army brigadier general
- David Shaw (British Army officer) (born 1957), British Army major general
- Frederick Shaw (British Army officer) (1861–1942), British Army lieutenant general
- Frederick B. Shaw (1869–1957), U.S. Army brigadier general
- Hugh Shaw (British Army officer) (1839–1904), British Army major general
- James Shaw (British Army officer, 19th century) (1788-1865), British army general
- James Shaw (British Army officer, 20th century) (fl. 1972–2005), British army general
- John E. Shaw (born 1968), U.S. Space Force lieutenant general
- Jonathan Shaw (British Army officer) (born 1957), British Army major general
- Samuel R. Shaw (1911–1989), U.S. Marine Corps brigadier general

== See also ==
- Jeff Shaw (politician) (1949–2010), Attorney General of New South Wales
