= Shaun Burley =

British Army officer

Major General Shaun Burley CB MBE
- Born: 4 March 1962 (age 64); Shipston on Stour, United Kingdom
- Military career
- Allegiance: United Kingdom
- Branch: British Army
- Service years: 1982 –
- Rank: Major-General
- Commands: 8 Force Engineer Brigade; Theatre Troops
- Conflicts: Afghanistan War; Iraq War
- Awards: Companion of the Order of the Bath; Member of the Order of the British Empire

Major General Shaun Alex Burley, CB, MBE (born 4 March 1962) is a British Army officer who served as Military Secretary.

== Military career ==
Burley was commissioned into the Royal Engineers in 1982. He became Commander of 8 Force Engineer Brigade (undertaking work at Camp Bastion and then in Basra) as well as Commander Royal Engineers for the Field Army before being appointed Chief of Staff at the Land Warfare Centre. After a tour as Deputy Assistant Chief of Staff for Organisation in Headquarters Land Command, he went on to be Assistant Commandant (Land) at the Joint Services Command and Staff College in December 2009 and General Officer Commanding, Theatre Troops in 2011. He became Military Secretary in March 2013.

Military offices
Preceded by Bruce Brealey	General Officer Commanding, Theatre Troops; 2011–2013	Succeeded by Tim Radford
Preceded by Andrew Gregory	Military Secretary; 2013–2015	Succeeded by Nicholas Ashmore
