= Robert Gordon (British Army officer) =

Major General Robert Gordon CMG CBE
- Born: 23 November 1950 (age 75)
- Military career
- Allegiance: United Kingdom
- Branch: British Army
- Service years: 1970–2005
- Rank: Major General
- Commands: United Nations Mission in Ethiopia and Eritrea; 2nd Division; 19th Mechanised Brigade; 17th/21st Lancers
- Conflicts: Operation Banner; Gulf War; Bosnian War
- Awards: Companion of the Order of St Michael and St George; Commander of the Order of the British Empire

Major General Robert Duncan Seaton Gordon, CMG, CBE (born 23 November 1950) is a former British Army officer who commanded the 2nd Division from 1999 to 2002 and served as Force Commander of the United Nations Mission in Ethiopia and Eritrea from 2002 to 2005.

== Military career ==
Educated at Wellington College and St Catharine's College, Cambridge, Gordon was commissioned into the 17th/21st Lancers in 1970 and subsequently saw operational service in Cyprus and Northern Ireland. He was made commanding officer of his regiment in 1990 and saw service in the Gulf War. He was made Secretary to the Chiefs of Staff Committee at the Ministry of Defence in 1992 and commander of the 19th Mechanised Brigade in 1994 and then commanded the South West Sector during the Bosnian War. He was appointed Director of Army Public Relations at the Ministry of Defence in 1997, General Officer Commanding 2nd Division in 1999 (also becoming Governor of Edinburgh Castle in 2000) and Force Commander of the United Nations Mission in Ethiopia and Eritrea in October 2002, before he retired in 2005.

In retirement Gordon has become a consultant as well as a trustee of the Kohima Education Trust.

== Family ==
Gordon is married to Gina; they have two sons.

Military offices
Preceded by Dair Farrar-Hockley	GOC 2nd Division; 1999–2002	Succeeded by Nick Parker
