= Anthony Farrar-Hockley =

British Army general (1924–2006)

General Sir Anthony Farrar-Hockley GBE KCB DSO & Bar MC
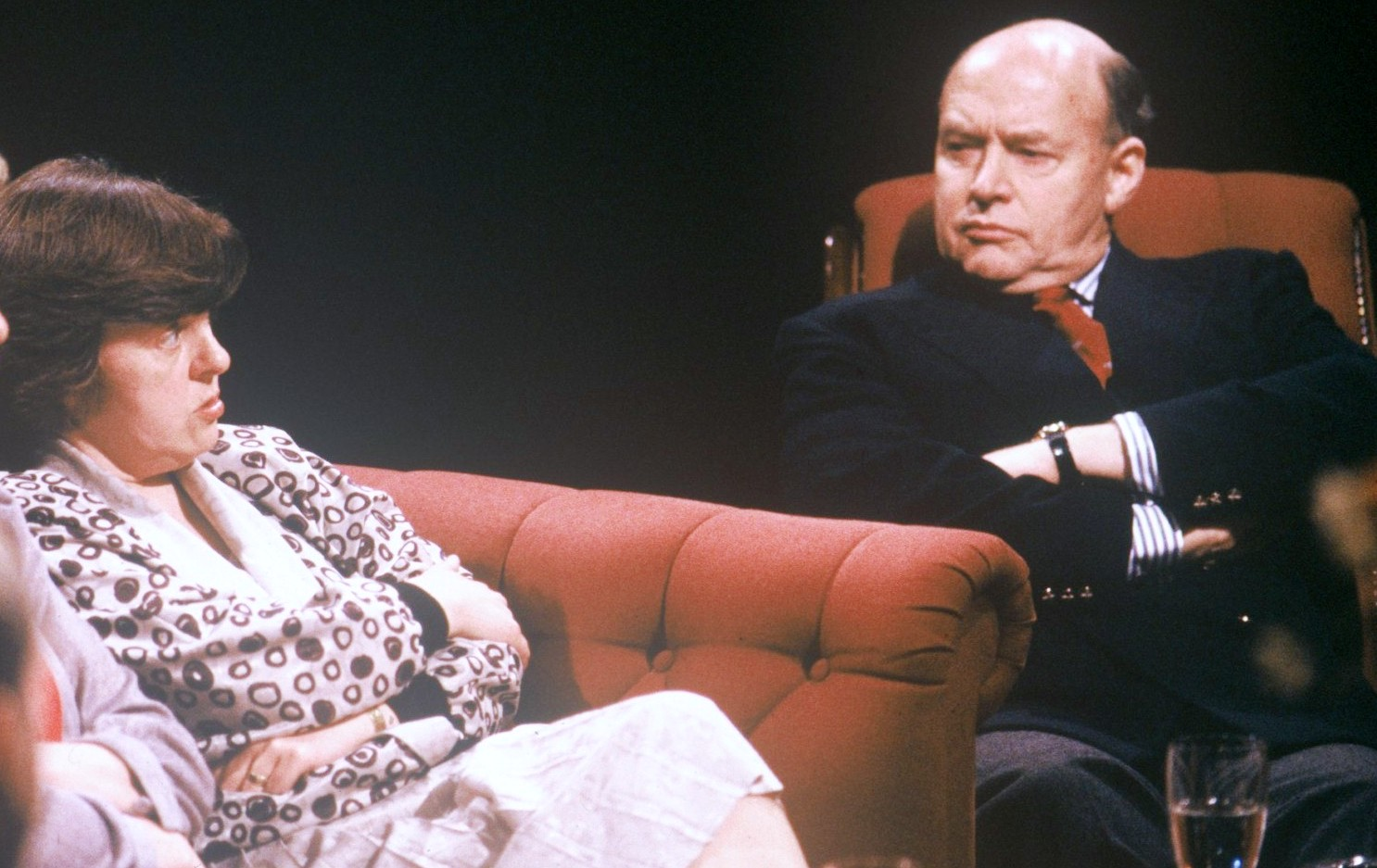
- Appearing with Bernadette McAliskey on After Dark, 18 March 1988: "Licensed to Kill?"
- Born: Anthony Heritage Farrar-Hockley; 8 April 1924; Coventry, Warwickshire, England
- Died: 11 March 2006 (aged 81); Moulsford, Oxfordshire, England
- Burial place: St John the Baptist, Moulsford
- Education: Exeter College, Oxford
- Spouses: Margaret Bernadette Wells (m. 1945; died 1981); Linda Wood (m. 1983)
- Children: 3 including Charles Dair Farrar-Hockley
- Military career
- Allegiance: United Kingdom
- Branch: British Army
- Service years: 1941–1982
- Rank: General
- Nickname: "Farrar the Para"
- Service number: 251309
- Units: Gloucestershire Regiment; Wiltshire Regiment; Parachute Regiment
- Commands: Allied Forces Northern Europe; South East District; 4th Division; 16th Parachute Brigade; 3rd Battalion, Parachute Regiment
- Conflicts: Second World War; Greek Civil War; Palestine Emergency; Korean War; Cyprus Emergency; Indonesian Confrontation; Aden Emergency
- Awards: Knight Grand Cross of the Order of the British Empire; Knight Commander of the Order of the Bath; Companion of the Distinguished Service Order & Bar; Military Cross; Mentioned in Despatches (2)
- Other work: ADC General to the Queen; Military historian

General Sir Anthony Heritage Farrar-Hockley (8 April 1924 – 11 March 2006), nicknamed Farrar the Para, was a British Army officer and a military historian who fought in a number of conflicts and ended his career as Commander-in-Chief of NATO's Allied Forces Northern Europe. Throughout his four decades of army life, he spoke plainly; and both before and after his retirement in 1982, he wrote on the conflicts he had experienced and the Second World War.

== Personal life ==
Anthony Farrar-Hockley was born in Coventry, Warwickshire, England, on 8 April 1924, the son of Arthur Farrar-Hockley, a journalist, and Agnes Beatrice (née Griffin).

On 7 July 1945 in St Peter's Church, Ealing, Farrar-Hockley married Margaret Bernadette Wells with whom he had three sons (two of whom survive). His first wife died in 1981 and he married Linda Wood in 1983. Following in father's footsteps his elder son Charles Dair Farrar-Hockley also won an MC fighting with the Parachute Regiment in the Falklands War.

During his mid-career Farrar-Hockley was carrying out research and publishing. He established a reputation as an authority on the First World War, publishing The Somme (1964) and Death of an Army (1968). By way of sabbatical during his military career he spent time (1968–1970) at Exeter College, Oxford as a Defence Fellow, working on a research project into the social effects of National Service in Britain and publishing two other books. He gained a BLitt at Oxford University.

== Military career ==
At the outbreak of the Second World War in September 1939, at the age of 15, Farrar-Hockley ran away from school and enlisted in the ranks with the Gloucestershire Regiment. After the discovery of his age he was discharged. In 1941 he enlisted again and was posted to the 70th (Young Soldiers) Battalion, Glosters. He was promoted to sergeant while still aged 17 and only 18 when he was commissioned into the Wiltshire Regiment, before transferring to the Parachute Regiment in November 1942. In November 1942 he was commissioned and posted to the new 1st Airborne Division seeing action with the Parachute Regiment in Italy and Southern France and Greece. He was still only 20 in 1944 when he was given command of a company in the 6th (Royal Welch) Parachute Battalion and later won a Military Cross in Greece whilst resisting the communist rebellion in Athens during the Greek Civil War.

After post-war service with the Gloucestershire Regiment, having gained a permanent commission in that regiment in April 1945, in Palestine during the Palestine Emergency, Farrar-Hockley fought in the Korean War, still with the Glosters as adjutant. He provided inspiring leadership during the Battle of the Imjin River and fight for Hill 235. "A" Company had undergone lengthy attack, taken severe officer casualties and was struggling. Farrar-Hockley volunteered to reinforce the company and his presence had an immediate effect. The company were able to retrench and hold on for some time. Nevertheless, they became surrounded, ran out of ammunition, and after hand-to-hand fighting with bayonets were ordered to withdraw. Farrar-Hockley organised an orderly withdrawal, but as one of the last to leave the position he was captured. The Glosters became known as the Glorious Glosters and he was appointed a Companion of the Distinguished Service Order (DSO), although he was a captain and being appointed a DSO was usually reserved for more senior ranks. His citation stated:

Throughout this desperate engagement on which the ability of the Battalion to hold its position entirely depended, Captain Farrar-Hockley was an inspiration to the defenders. His outstanding gallantry, fighting spirit and great powers of leadership heartened his men and welded them into an indomitable team. His conduct could not have been surpassed.

Farrar-Hockley spent two years as a prisoner of war. He was mentioned in despatches for his conduct. After active service in the Cyprus Emergency (1956), Egypt (1956) and Jordan (1958), he spent some time at Royal Military Academy Sandhurst as chief instructor (1959–1961)

In 1962 Farrar-Hockley took command of 3rd Battalion, Parachute Regiment in the Persian Gulf. While there possibly the greatest feat of arms of his career took place in 1964 during the Aden Emergency when his battalion captured a stronghold held by nationalist and tribesmen in the Radfan mountains of north of Aden at Wadi Dhubsan. For this action Farrar-Hockley was awarded a Bar to his DSO.

In 1965 Farrar-Hockley was posted as chief of staff to the director of operations in Borneo in the Far East. Indonesia under President Sukarno was confronting Malaysia. Secret and unattributable cross-border operations which Farrar-Hockley helped to organise on Indonesian territory helped bring the military confrontation to an end.

After commanding (1966–1968) the 16th Parachute Brigade and his fellowship at Exeter College, Oxford (1968–1970), Farrar-Hockley was promoted to major general and appointed as the first commander Land Forces in Belfast, where he was the first senior officer to acknowledge publicly that the IRA was behind the violence. After this he commanded the 4th Division in BAOR (1971–1973) before returning to the Ministry of Defence, where he was put in charge of combat development for the Army.

After a period as general officer commanding South East District (1977–1979), Farrar-Hockley was appointed commander in chief of Nato's Allied Forces Northern Europe. He held this appointment until his retirement from the army in 1982.

== Later life ==
Other positions held by Farrar-Hockley included: ADC general to the Queen (1981–1983), colonel-commandant of the Prince of Wales's Division (1974–1980) and of the Parachute Regiment (1977–1983). He was colonel of his Gloucestershire Regiment 1978–1984.

During his retirement Farrar-Hockley carried out historical research and published campaign histories and biographies, he acted as a consultant and was a frequent pundit in the newspapers and on television and radio. He commanded the French at Waterloo in an episode of the brief TV series A Game of War in 1997.

Farrar-Hockley is known to have been a target for the IRA after his name was found on an hitlist in the 1980s. In 1990, his 5-year-old grandson found a bomb attached to a hose in his garden. The bomb failed to explode.

Farrar-Hockley declared to The Guardian that a secret arms network was established in Britain after the war, but declined to say if it still existed. He aroused controversy in 1983 when he became involved trying to organise a campaign for a new home guard against possible Soviet invasion and in 1990, following Italian prime minister Giulio Andreotti's October 1990 revelations concerning Operation Gladio, a NATO stay-behind network, he said that the armed anti-communist secret resistance network across western European had involved Britain.

His honours included: Mentioned in despatches 1943, MC 1944, DSO 1953, Mentioned in despatches 1954, MBE 1957, DSO bar 1964, KCB 1977, GBE 1982.

== Works ==
From British Library catalogue (October 2006).

=== By himself ===
- 1954. The Edge of the Sword. London: Frederick Muller. (later edition ISBN 0-352-30977-6).
- 1959. True Book about the Second World War. London: Frederick Muller: London.
- 1966. The Somme. London: Pan. (later edition ISBN 0-330-28035-X).
- 1967. Death of an army. London : Barker. (later edition ISBN 1-85326-698-1).
- 1969. The war in the desert. London: Faber & Faber. ISBN 0-571-08949-6.
- 1970. Airborne carpet: Operation Market Garden. London: Macdonald & Co. ISBN 0-356-03037-7.
- 1972. Arnhem : parachutisten vallen uit de hemel. Antwerpen : Standaard.
- 1975. Goughie. The life of General Sir Hubert Gough. London: Hart-Davis, MacGibbon. ISBN 0-246-64059-6.
- 1976. Infantry tactics. London: Almark Publishing. ISBN 0-85524-255-8
- 1988. Opening rounds: lessons of military history 1918–1988. London: Deutsch. ISBN 0-233-98009-1.
- 1990. The British part in the Korean War: Vol.1, A distant obligation. London: HMSO. ISBN 0-11-630953-9.
- 1994. The army in the air: the history of the Army Air Corps. Far Thrupp, Stroud: A. Sutton Publishing. ISBN 0-7509-0617-0.
- 1995. The British part in the Korean War: Vol 2, An honourable discharge. London: HMSO. ISBN 0-11-630958-X.
- to be published 2007. MacArthur (Great Commanders S.). London: Weidenfeld & Nicolson. ISBN 0-297-84684-1

=== With others ===
- Brown, Neville and Farrar-Hockley, Anthony. (1985). Nuclear first use. Buchan & Enright. ISBN 0-907675-26-3
- Farrar-Hockley, Anthony chapter in: Daniell, David S. (2005). Cap of honour: the 300 years of the Gloucestershire Regiment. Stroud: Sutton. ISBN 0-7509-4172-3.
- Hamilton, Ian S. M. (ed. Farrar-Hockley, Anthony). (1957). The Commander. London: Hollis & Carter.

Military offices
Preceded by David Fraser	GOC 4th Division; 1971–1973	Succeeded by Michael Gow
Preceded by Sir James Wilson	GOC South East District; 1977–1979	Succeeded by Sir George Cooper
Honorary titles
Preceded by Anthony Arengo-Jones	Colonel of the Gloucestershire Regiment; 1978–1984	Succeeded by Sir John Waters
Military offices
Preceded by Sir Peter Whiteley	C-in-C Allied Forces Northern Europe; 1979–1982	Succeeded by Sir Richard Lawson
