= 19th Light Brigade =

British army unit

19th Brigade 19th Infantry Brigade 19th Light Brigade
- Tactical Recognition Flash of 19 Light Brigade
- Active: 1892–1901; 1914–1919; 1938–1939; 1950–2013; 2022–
- Country: United Kingdom
- Branch: British Army
- Type: Infantry
- Role: Reserve Light Infantry
- Size: Brigade
- Part of: 1st (UK) Division
- Garrison/HQ: Imphal Barracks
- Engagements: Second Boer War; First World War; Second World War; War in Afghanistan; Operation Telic

Commanders
- Current commander: Brigadier Lisa Brooks
- Notable commanders: Horace Smith-Dorrien; General Sir Mark Carleton-Smith

The 19th Brigade is an Army Reserve formation of the British Army. As the 19th Infantry Brigade, it fought in the South African War, First and Second World War.

The formation became 19th Light Brigade in 2005, and moved to Northern Ireland following the end of Operation Banner and "normalisation" of British military operations in the province. Following the 2010 Strategic Defence and Security Review (SDSR), the brigade entered suspended animation in March 2013. As part of the Future Soldier reform, the brigade was reactivated in 2022.

== Second Boer War ==
19th Brigade was assembled on 12 February 1900 as part of Lieutenant-General Thomas Kelly-Kenny’s operations following the Relief of Kimberley. From late February 1900 the brigade formed part of Lieutenant General Sir Henry Edward Colvile's 9th Division, alongside Major-General Hector MacDonald’s 3rd (Highland) Brigade. It was initially composed of the 1st Battalion, Gordon Highlanders; the 2nd Battalion, Duke of Cornwall’s Light Infantry; the 2nd Battalion, King’s Shropshire Light Infantry; and the 2nd (Special Service) Battalion, Royal Canadian Regiment.

The brigade’s first major operation was the Battle of Paardeberg. It moved up to the south of Paardeberg Drift on 17 February 1900 and helped enclose General Piet Cronjé’s Boer force, which surrendered on 27 February 1900. Contemporary accounts described the 19th Brigade as among the strongest infantry formations in Lord Roberts’s army. At Paardeberg, the brigade comprised the Gordons, Canadians, Shropshires, and Cornwall Light Infantry. The Canadian battalion was later selected to lead the decisive night attack that preceded Cronjé’s surrender.

After Paardeberg, the brigade advanced with the 9th Division toward the Orange Free State capital of Bloemfontein. It took part in the Battle of Poplar Grove on 7 March 1900 and the Battle of Driefontein on 10 March 1900, before Bloemfontein was occupied on 13 March. During the advance, the brigade operated on the left of Lord Roberts’s three-column formation at Driefontein. The Royal Canadian Regiment was detached at times to escort naval guns and to support the Highland Brigade’s rapid movement toward Poplar Grove Drift.

In late April 1900, the brigade was transferred from the 9th Division to a mobile column commanded by Lieutenant-General Ian Hamilton. The column also included the 21st Brigade, mounted infantry, and artillery, and was intended to counter Boer commandos operating around Thabanchu and Sannah’s Post. The brigade fought at Israel’s Poort on 25 April 1900, where the RCR led the assault and its commanding officer, Lieutenant-Colonel William Otter, was wounded but remained in command. It subsequently fought at Hout Nek on 1 May and helped force the Boer position on the Zand River on 16 May.

The brigade crossed the Vaal River into the South African Republic in late May 1900 as part of Hamilton’s column. On 29 May it fought at Doornkop (also called the Battle of Florida), where the Gordon Highlanders and RCR assaulted the Boer left while the 21st Brigade attacked the right. The position was cleared by about 5 p.m., helping open the way to Johannesburg. The brigade then advanced on Pretoria, which British forces occupied on 5 June 1900. On arrival, the original brigade was temporarily dissolved; the RCR was unbrigaded for two days before the formation was reconstituted on 7 June.

After its reformation, the 1st Battalion, Suffolk Regiment replaced the Shropshire Light Infantry. From 8 June 1900 the brigade was assigned to protect the line of communication between Kroonstad and Pretoria, supported by the 74th Battery, Royal Field Artillery, and half a company of Royal Engineers. Smith-Dorrien recorded that, between its formation on 12 February and the fall of Pretoria, the brigade had marched 620 miles, fought in ten general engagements and on 27 other days, and helped capture ten towns. He noted that in one 30-day period it fought on 21 days and marched 327 miles.

=== Order of battle ===
The brigade's composition was as follows:

- 2nd Battalion, Duke of Cornwall’s Light Infantry
- 2nd Battalion, King’s Shropshire Light Infantry (12 February-5 June 1900)
- 1st Battalion, Gordon Highlanders
- 2nd (Special Service) Battalion, The Royal Canadian Regiment
- 1st Battalion, Suffolk Regiment (Joined on 7 June 1900 during the brigade’s reorganisation after Pretoria, replacing the 2nd Battalion, King’s Shropshire Light Infantry)

=== Commanders ===
Major-General Horace Smith-Dorrien commanded the brigade from its formation until late April 1900. When the brigade was temporarily grouped with the 21st Infantry Brigade in Ian Hamilton’s column, Smith-Dorrien took tactical command of both brigades, and Colonel James Spens of the King’s Shropshire Light Infantry assumed command of the 19th Brigade.

== First World War ==
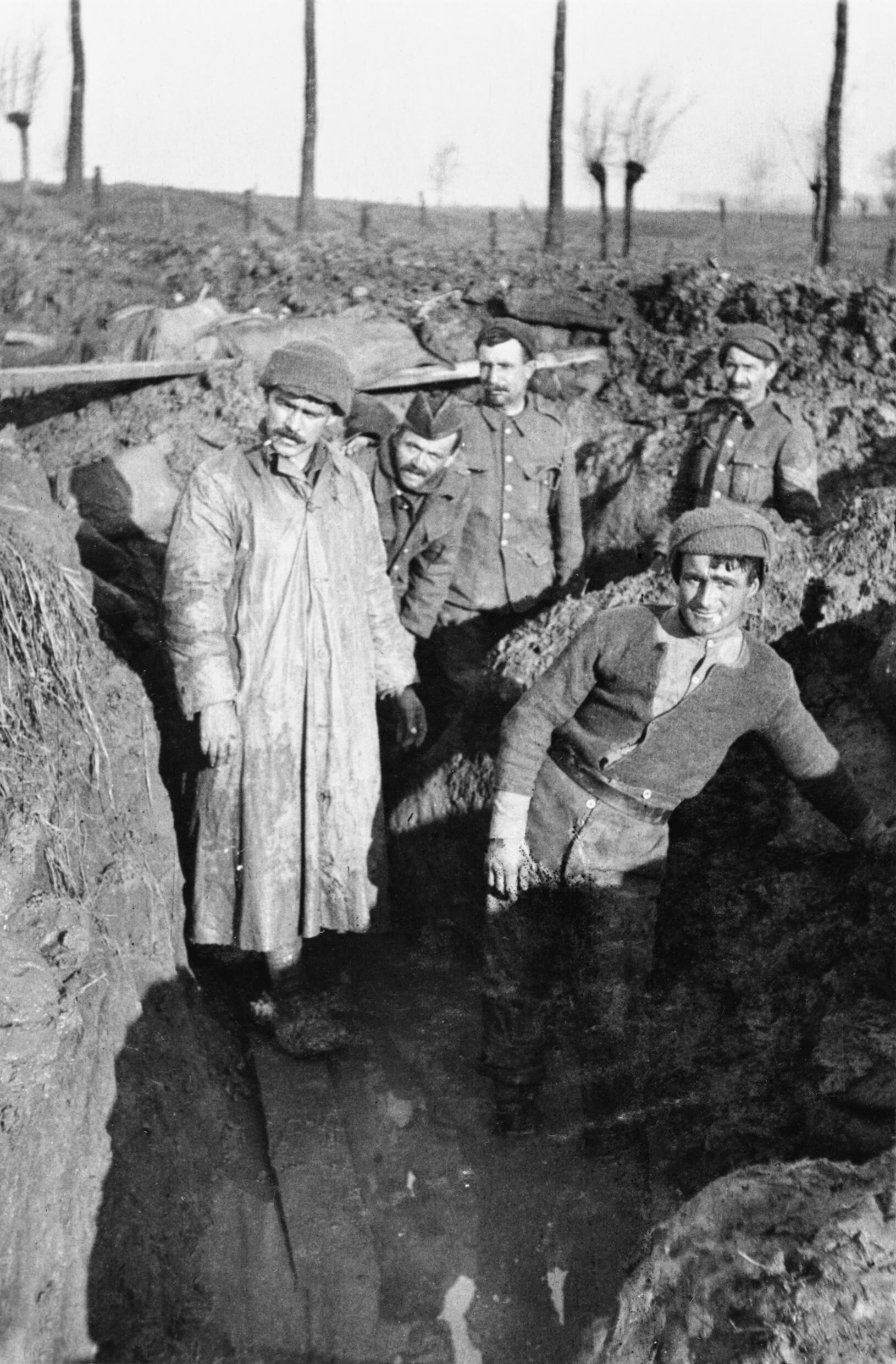
Soldiers of "A" Company, 1st Battalion, Cameronians (Scottish Rifles) in the trenches at Houplines during December 1914.

19th Infantry Brigade was not part of the original British Expeditionary Force (BEF) but was formed in France between 19 and 22 August 1914 from line of communication defence battalions as an independent brigade. It immediately went into action at the Battle of Mons on 23 August, then participated in the Retreat from Mons and subsequent battles under various corps headquarters.

From 12 October 1914 the brigade was attached to 6th Division at the time of the Battle of Armentières, transferring to 27 Division on 31 May 1915. On 19 August 1915, 19th Bde formally joined 2nd Division (replacing 4th (Guards) Bde, which had left to join the new Guards Division). It served with 2nd Division at the Battle of Loos.

These attachments had all been to formations of the Regular Army, but on 25 November 1915, 2nd Division exchanged 19th Bde with a brigade from 33rd Division, a newly-arrived 'New Army' ('Kitchener's Army') formation. The intention was to share experience, and as soon as it joined 33rd Division, the brigade exchanged one of its veteran battalions with one of the newcomers. It remained with 33rd Division on the Western Front until the Armistice with Germany. Like the rest of the BEF, it was reduced from a four-battalion to a three-battalion establishment in February 1918.

=== Order of battle ===
The independent brigade's initial composition was as follows:

- 2nd Battalion, Royal Welch Fusiliers – to 38th (Welsh) Division 4 February 1918
- 1st Battalion, Cameronians (Scottish Rifles)
- 1st Battalion, Middlesex Regiment – to 98th Bde in 33rd Division 27 November 1915
- 2nd Battalion, Argyll and Sutherland Highlanders – to 98th Bde 27 November 1915
- 19th Bde Ammunition Column, Royal Field Artillery – probably absorbed into 2nd Divisional Ammunition Column
- 19th Field Ambulance, Royal Army Medical Corps
- No 8 Company, Army Service Corps (ASC) – to 33rd Divisional Train, ASC, 25 November 1915

Subsequent additions:

- 1/5th Battalion, Cameronians (Scottish Rifles) (later 5th/6th Battalion) (Territorial Force) – joined 19 November 1914
- Section, 2nd Division Signal Company, Royal Engineers (RE) – transferred with brigade to 33rd Division
- 11th Field Company, RE – transferred with brigade to 33rd Division
- 20th (Service) Battalion, Royal Fusiliers (3rd Public Schools) – from 98th Bde 27 November 1915; disbanded 2–15 February 1918
- 1/6th Battalion, Cameronians (Scottish Rifles) (TF) – joined from 100th Bde, 33rd Division, and amalgamated with 1/5th Bn 29 May 1916
- 1st Battalion Queen's (Royal West Surrey Regiment) – joined from 100th Bde 5 February 1918
- 19th Bde Machine Gun Company, Machine Gun Corps (MGC) – formed in the brigade 24 February 1916; joined No 33 Battalion, MGC, 9–19 February 1918
- A/19 Light Trench Mortar Battery – formed by 26 January 1916; became 19/1 LTMB 23 March 1916; amalgamated by 24 June 1916
- B/19 Light Trench Mortar Battery – formed by 15 March 1916; became 19/2 LTMB 23 March 1916; amalgamated by 24 June 1916'
- 19 Light Trench Mortar Battery – formed by 24 June 1916

=== Commanders ===
The following officers commanded the brigade:

- Maj-Gen L.G. Drummond, 22 August 1914, sick 27 August 1914
- Lt-Col B.E. Wards, acting 27 August–5 September 1914
- Brig-Gen Hon F. Gordon, 5 September 1914 – 14 June 1915
- Brig-Gen P.R. Robertson, 14 June 1915 – 13 July 1916
- Brig-Gen C.R.G. Mayne, 13 July 1916–Armistice
- Lt-Col J.G. Chaplin, acting 28–31 August 1916
- Lt-Col St B.R. Sladen, acting 8 March, killed 12 March 1918
- Lt-Col H. Storr, acting 12 March, wounded 13 March 1918
- Lt-Col H.B. Spens, acting 13–25 March 1918

== Second World War ==
The 19th Infantry Brigade was a regular British Army formation at the beginning of the Second World War. It had been raised in 1938 for Internal Security in Palestine, and appears to have joined the 7th Infantry Division on its reformation in September–October 1938. On 3 September 1939, it was converted to HQ Jerusalem Area.

== Post-1945 ==
In the late 1970s, as 19 Airportable Brigade, throughout the 1980s, as 19 Infantry Brigade the 19th Brigade was based at Colchester as part of the 3rd Infantry Division.

=== Structure 1989 ===
Component units in 1989:

- Headquarters 19th Infantry Brigade and 209th Signal Squadron, Royal Corps of Signals
- The Royal Hussars (PWO) (Tidworth)
- 1st Battalion, King's Own Royal Border Regiment
- 1st Battalion, Royal Anglian Regiment
- 3rd Battalion, Royal Anglian Regiment
- 34 Field Squadron, Royal Engineers

It would have had to cross the English Channel to join the rest of the division, stationed with the British Army of the Rhine in Germany. Following the disbandment of the 3rd Armoured Division following the end of the Cold War, the brigade joined the new 3rd Mechanised Division, and moved to Catterick Garrison in Yorkshire in April 1993. The brigade signal squadron was based at Gaza Barracks, Catterick Garrison. The brigade deployed as part of Operation Grapple 5, the UK contribution to the United Nations Protection Force (UNPROFOR) in the former Yugoslavia, between November 1994 and May 1995. They were replaced by 20 Armoured Brigade HQ and Signal Sqn.

In September 1995, the HQ and Signal Sqn deployed on Exercise SUMAN WARRIOR at Canberra Lines, Terendak Camp, Malaysia. Members of the Signal Sqn also deployed on EX Med Man 5 in 1996 as part of the 1KORBR battle group at British Army Training Unit Suffield, Canada. The HQ and Signal Sqn then deployed to Operation Lodestar in the Former Yugoslavia between November 1997 and May 1998. This was as part of the NATO SFOR deployment. The brigade HQ and Signal Squadron were part of MND SW HQ AND SIGNAL SQN based at the Banja Luka metal factory and other locations.

As part of the Delivering Security in a Changing World review in 2003, it was announced that the brigade was to become a 'light' formation. The brigade deployed on Operation Telic 2 between May and November 2003 taking over from 7 Armoured Brigade. The brigade became 19 Light Brigade as of 1 January 2005, and deployed to Iraq on Operation Telic 9 (November 2006 – May 2007) for an unusually long 7-month tour before handing over to 1 Mechanised Brigade and returning to Catterick. It then began moving to Northern Ireland following the end of Operation Banner and "normalisation" of British military operations in the province.

The brigade deployed on Operation Herrick 10 in April 2009, replacing 3 Commando Brigade, where it planned and executed Operation Panther's Claw – named after Bagheera, the panther forming the brigade insignia. The brigade returned to the UK in October 2009 having taken over 70 fatalities --- significantly more than seen in previous operational tours of Afghanistan.

Secretary of Defence Liam Fox announced on 18 July 2011 that the 19th Brigade was to be disbanded as part of the 2010 Strategic Defence and Security Review (SDSR) in March 2013.

=== Brigade Commanders ===
Recent commanders have included:

19th Infantry Brigade

- 1967–1969 Brigadier WNR Scotter, Late KORBR
- 1969–1971 Brigadier GLC Cooper, Late RE
- 1973–1975 Brigadier JM Glover, Late RGJ
- 1975–1977 Brigadier RF Vincent, Late RA
- 1985–1987 Brigadier TP Toyne Sewell, Late KOSB
- 1989–1991 Brigadier CD Farrar-Hockley, Late PARA
- 1991–1993 Brigadier EJ Webb-Carter, Late GREN GDS
- 1994–1995 Brigadier RDS Gordon, Late 17/21L
- 1995–1997 Brigadier ADA Duncan, Late PWO
- 1997–2000 Brigadier PTC Pearson, Late RGR
- 2000–2001 Brigadier NH Rollo, Late RE
- 2001–2003 Brigadier WH Moore, Late RA

19th Light Brigade

- 2003–2005 Brigadier C Chapman, Late PARA
- 2005–2007 Brigadier TP Evans, Late RIFLES
- 2007–2010 Brigadier TB Radford, Late RIFLES
- 2010–2012 Brigadier SR Skeates, Late RA
- 2012–2013 Brigadier EJR Chamberlain, Late RIFLES

19th Brigade

- 2022–2024 Brigadier O Lyttle, Late R IRISH
- 2024-present Brigadier L Brooks, Late RA

== Reformation ==
In 2021, as part of the Future Soldier initiative, it was announced that the 19th Brigade would be reformed with its headquarters at Imphal Barracks, York. The brigade, tasked with home defence and resilience duties, officially re-formed on 23 July 2022 under the command of the 1st (United Kingdom) Division.

On its reformation in July 2022 the brigade's units were listed as:

- Queen's Own Yeomanry, at Fenham Barracks, Newcastle upon Tyne
- Scottish and North Irish Yeomanry, at Redford Barracks, Edinburgh
- 52nd Lowland Volunteers, 6th Battalion, Royal Regiment of Scotland, at Walcheren Barracks, Glasgow
- 51st Highland Volunteers, 7th Battalion, Royal Regiment of Scotland at Queen's Barracks, Perth
- 4th Battalion, Duke of Lancaster's Regiment (King's, Lancashire and Border), at Kimberley Barracks, Preston
- 3rd Battalion, Royal Anglian Regiment, in Bury St Edmunds
- 4th Battalion, The Royal Yorkshire Regiment (14th/15th, 19th and 33rd/76th Foot), at Worsley Barracks, York
- 2nd Battalion, Royal Irish Regiment (27th (Inniskilling), 83rd, 87th and Ulster Defence Regiment), at Thiepval Barracks, Lisburn
- 6th Battalion, The Rifles, at Wyvern Barracks, Exeter
- 8th Battalion, The Rifles, in Bishop Auckland

== Bibliography ==
- A.F. Becke,History of the Great War: Order of Battle of Divisions, Part 1: The Regular British Divisions, London: HM Stationery Office, 1934/Uckfield: Naval & Military Press, 2007, ISBN 1-847347-38-X.
- A.F. Becke,History of the Great War: Order of Battle of Divisions, Part 3b: New Army Divisions (30–41) and 63rd (R.N.) Division, London: HM Stationery Office, 1939/Uckfield: Naval & Military Press, 2007, ISBN 1-847347-41-X.
- James E. Edmonds, History of the Great War: Military Operations, France and Belgium, 1914, Vol I, 3rd Edn, London: Macmillan,1933/Woking: Shearer, 1986, ISBN 0-946998-01-9.
- Joslen, H. F. (2003) [1960]. Orders of Battle: Second World War, 1939–1945. Uckfield, East Sussex: Naval and Military Press. ISBN 978-1-84342-474-1.
