= Tim Radford (British Army officer) =

British army officer

General Sir Tim Radford KCB DSO OBE
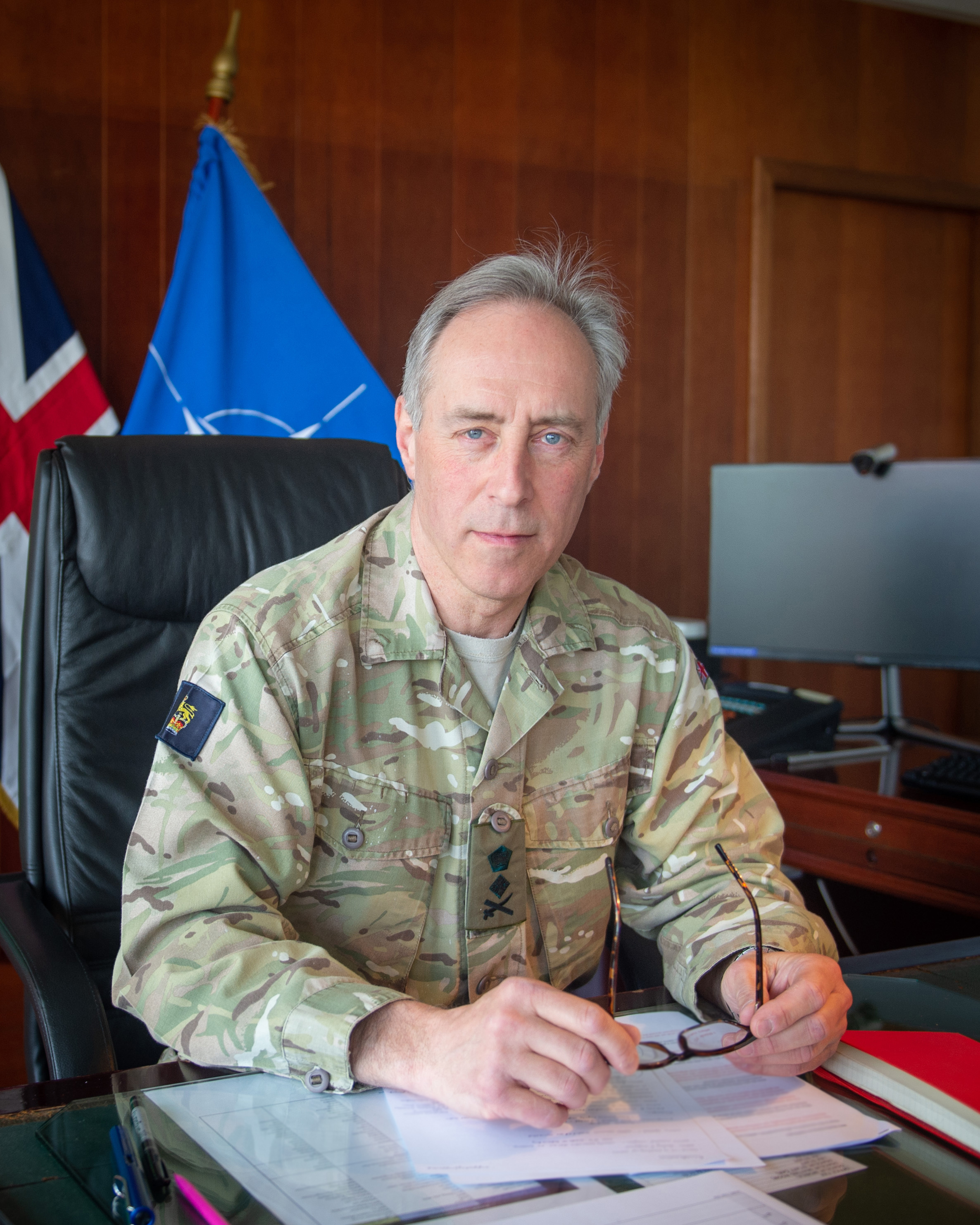
- Radford in uniform, 2020
- Born: 23 February 1963 (age 63)
- Alma mater: St Chad's College, Durham (BA); King's College London (MA)
- Military career
- Allegiance: United Kingdom
- Branch: British Army
- Service years: 1984–2024
- Rank: General
- Commands: Allied Rapid Reaction Corps; Force Troops Command; Task Force Helmand; 19 Light Brigade
- Conflicts: The Troubles; Iraq War; War in Afghanistan; Sierra Leone Civil War
- Awards: Knight Commander of the Order of the Bath; Distinguished Service Order; Officer of the Order of the British Empire; Queen's Commendation for Valuable Service; Officer of the Legion of Merit (United States)

General Sir Timothy Buchan Radford, KCB, DSO, OBE (born 23 February 1963) is a retired British Army officer who served as Deputy Supreme Allied Commander Europe, Commander Allied Rapid Reaction Corps and Deputy Commander Resolute Support Mission.

== Early life and education ==
Radford was born on 23 February 1963 in Dalton, Lancashire, England. His father, Colin Buchanan Radford (1931–2022), was an academic who specialised in French drama, and his mother, Inge Radford (née Frankel; 1932–2016), escaped the Holocaust via the Kindertransport and went on to become a social worker in her adopted country, the UK. He was educated at Methodist College Belfast, a co-educational grammar school in Belfast, Northern Ireland, and at Rugby School, then an all-boys public school (i.e. independent boarding school). He studied politics at Durham University, graduating with a Bachelor of Arts (BA) degree. He later attended King's College London as a postgraduate, completing a Master of Arts (MA) degree in war studies.

== Military career ==
Radford was commissioned into The Light Infantry on 31 August 1984. He spent four years in command appointments before joining the School of Infantry as an instructor in 1989. He attended Staff College, Camberley in 1995. As a lieutenant colonel, he developed the British Army's leadership doctrine at the Royal Military Academy Sandhurst and was the founding commanding officer of the Special Reconnaissance Regiment.

On promotion to colonel in 2005 he was appointed as Assistant Director of Counter Terrorism and United Kingdom Operations at the Ministry of Defence. He went on to command 19 Light Brigade in 2008, during which he deployed as Commander of Task Force Helmand between April and October of that year and led the major offensive Operation Panther's Claw in Summer 2009. Before Panther's Claw, Radford clashed with Lieutenant Colonel Rupert Thorneloe, who argued that it was flawed in concept and that there were not enough British forces to hold the ground.

In January 2010 Radford was made Head of Overseas Operations in the Ministry of Defence and, on promotion to major general in November 2011, he assumed the position of Chief of Staff of the ISAF Joint Command in Kabul, Afghanistan. He took over as General Officer Force Troops Command in February 2013, and in this capacity he oversaw the operation to provide medical assistance for the Ebola outbreak in West Africa in 2014. On promotion to lieutenant general in July 2015 he was selected as Deputy Commander Resolute Support Mission, and then as Commander Allied Rapid Reaction Corps in July 2016. He was promoted to general and assumed the appointment of Deputy Supreme Allied Commander Europe on 2 April 2020. His term as DSACEUR ended in July 2023, and he retired from the army on 11 January 2024.

Author Toby Harnden has described Radford, during his time as a Brigade commander in Afghanistan, as "a softly spoken, cerebral officer, [with] piercing blue eyes and an understated manner honed during years of operations in Northern Ireland and Iraq...a listener rather than a talker. His thoughtful, considered approach, [was] underpinned by great compassion "

== Honours and decorations ==
Radford was appointed Member of the Order of the British Empire (MBE) in April 1994, and Officer of the Order of the British Empire (OBE) in the 2007 New Year Honours. He was awarded the Distinguished Service Order (DSO) in March 2010. Radford was appointed Companion of the Order of the Bath (CB) in the 2016 Birthday Honours. On 23 November 2018, Radford was awarded the US Legion of Merit with the degree of officer. He was appointed Knight Commander of the Order of the Bath (KCB) in the 2021 Birthday Honours.

== Sources ==
- Harnden, Toby (2011). Dead Men Risen: The Welsh Guards and the Real Story of Britain's War in Afghanistan. Quercus. ISBN 978-1849164238.

Military offices
Preceded by Shaun Burley	General Officer Commanding, Force Troops Command; 2013–2015	Succeeded by Tyrone Urch
Preceded by Carsten Jacobson	Deputy Commander Resolute Support Mission; 2015–2016	Succeeded by Sandy Storrie
Preceded by Tim Evans	Commander Allied Rapid Reaction Corps; 2016–2019	Succeeded by Sir Edward Smyth-Osbourne
Preceded by James Everard	Deputy Supreme Allied Commander Europe; 2020–2023	Succeeded by Sir Keith Blount
