= Tom Copinger-Symes =

British Army officer (born 1969)

Lieutenant General Sir Tom Copinger-Symes KCB CBE
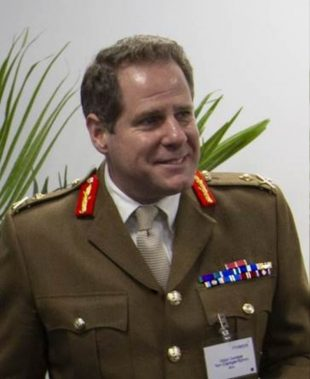
- Copinger-Symes in 2020
- Born: 18 November 1969 (age 56)
- Military career
- Allegiance: United Kingdom
- Branch: British Army
- Service years: 1992–2026
- Rank: Lieutenant General
- Unit: Royal Green Jackets
- Commands: Force Troops Command; 1st Intelligence, Surveillance and Reconnaissance Brigade; 5th Battalion, The Rifles
- Conflicts: Iraq War; War in Afghanistan
- Awards: Knight Commander of the Order of the Bath; Commander of the Order of the British Empire; Queen's Commendation for Valuable Service

Lieutenant General Sir Tom Richardson Copinger-Symes, KCB, CBE (born 18 November 1969) is a former senior British Army officer, who last served as the deputy commander, Strategic Command from May 2022 to November 2025. He previously served as general officer commanding Force Troops Command and Director of Military Digitisation, Strategic Command.

== Early life and education ==
Of Anglo-Irish descent, Copinger-Symes is the youngest son of Colonel Wilfred Copinger-Symes and his wife Susan née Richardson. Educated at Pangbourne College, Copinger-Symes went up to the University of Warwick, as a cadetship officer.

== Military career ==
Copinger-Symes was commissioned into the Royal Green Jackets in 1992. He deployed to Iraq in 2007, for which he was awarded a Queen's Commendation for Valuable Service. Under ISAF, he served as commanding officer of the 5th Battalion, The Rifles in Afghanistan from November 2011 to April 2012, for which he was appointed an Officer of the Order of the British Empire (OBE). He became commander of the 1st Intelligence, Surveillance and Reconnaissance Brigade in April 2014 and assistant chief of staff (operations) at Army Headquarters in June 2016. Copinger-Symes was advanced to Commander of the Order of the British Empire (CBE) in the 2017 Birthday Honours, and became general officer commanding Force Troops Command that December. He went on to be Director of Military Digitisation at Joint Forces Command in 2019. In May 2022 he was promoted lieutenant general, and was appointed deputy commander of Strategic Command. He stepped down from Strategic Command in November 2025, and retired from the British Army in May 2026.

== Honorary appointments ==
Copinger-Symes was appointed an Knight Commander of the Order of the Bath (KCB) in the 2025 New Year Honours.

Copinger-Symes was assistant colonel commandant of The Rifles from 2019 to 2023, and colonel commandant of the regiment from 2023 to 2026. In the former position he was present at Windsor Castle in 2020 to offer the salute to the outgoing colonel-in-chief of The Rifles, Prince Philip, Duke of Edinburgh.

Copinger-Symes serves on the advisory board of "Nimbus Ninety", the community for disruptive business and technology leaders, since 2018. A Freeman of the City of London, he is also a Liveryman of the Wax Chandlers' Company.

Military offices
Preceded by Sir Tyrone Urch	General Officer Commanding, Force Troops Command; 2017–2019	Succeeded by James Bowder
Preceded by Sir Robert Magowan	Deputy Commander Strategic Command; 2022–2025	Succeeded by Suraya Marshall
