= Dair Farrar-Hockley =

British Army general (born 1946)

Major General Dair Farrar-Hockley MC
- Born: 2 December 1946 (age 79); Brentford, Middlesex, England
- Military career
- Allegiance: United Kingdom
- Branch: British Army
- Service years: 1967–1999
- Rank: Major General
- Commands: 2nd Division; 19th Infantry Brigade; 3rd Battalion, Parachute Regiment
- Conflicts: The Troubles; Falklands War
- Awards: Military Cross

Major General Charles Dair Farrar-Hockley, MC (born 2 December 1946) is a retired British Army officer, and a former Director General of the Chartered Institute of Arbitrators. He is the son of General Sir Anthony Farrar-Hockley.

== Military career ==
Farrar-Hockley was born in Brentford. After schooling at Beaudesert Park and Exeter School, Farrar-Hockley was commissioned in The Parachute Regiment in 1967 and served in Malta, Libya, Cyprus and Northern Ireland. As Officer Commanding A Company, 2nd Battalion, The Parachute Regiment he fought at the battles of Goose Green and Wireless Ridge and also led the heli-borne assault to secure Bluff Cove – a crucial first step in developing a southern flank in the battle for Port Stanley – during the Falklands War where he was awarded the Military Cross for gallantry in action. He was made commanding officer of 3rd Battalion, The Parachute Regiment in 1984.

Farrar-Hockley was appointed Special Briefer to the Supreme Allied Commander Europe in 1986. After that he was appointed commander of the 19th Infantry Brigade at Colchester in 1989 and commander of Infantry Training at Warminster in 1993. From 1995 he assisted the Czech government in developing a new security policy. He was general officer commanding 2nd Division from 1996 until May 1999.

Farrar-Hockley is currently a patron of the Second World War Experience Centre.

== Works ==
- 'Future Instability In The Mediterranean Basin'
- ‘Lessons Learned by Britain’s Armed Forces After Bloody Sunday’ RUSI 7 October 2022
- 'Essays on the Falklands War'

== Sources ==
Military offices
Preceded by Patrick Cordingley	General Officer Commanding the 2nd Division; 1996–1999	Succeeded by Robert Gordon
