= Bruce Brealey =

Major-General of the British Army

Major General Bruce Brealey CB
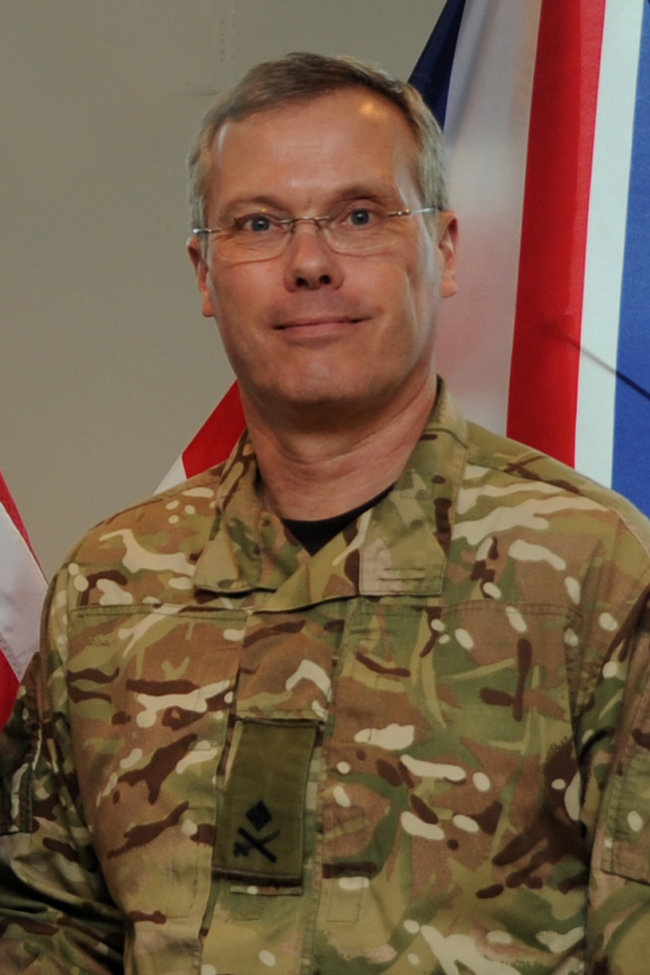
- Bruce Brealey in 2013
- Born: 1959 (age 66–67)
- Military career
- Allegiance: United Kingdom
- Branch: British Army
- Service years: 1984 – 2014
- Rank: Major General
- Commands: Theatre Troops
- Conflicts: Iraq War
- Awards: Companion of the Order of the Bath

Major General Bruce Brealey CB (born 8 February 1959) is a British Army officer who served as Deputy Commanding General of the Multi-National Corps – Iraq from 2007 to 2008.

== Military career ==
Educated at St Olave's Grammar School in Orpington, Brealey was commissioned into the Royal Artillery in 1984. He became Commander, Royal Artillery in December 2002, Assistant Chief of Staff, Plans at the Headquarters Land Command in January 2005 and Deputy Commanding General of the Multi-National Corps – Iraq in October 2007. He went on to be General Officer Commanding, Theatre Troops in November 2008 and Director-General, Capability in November 2011. He was made a companion of the Order of the Bath in 2012.

Military offices
Preceded by Gerald Berragan	Deputy Commanding General Multi-National Corps – Iraq; 2007–2008	Succeeded by Richard Barrons
Preceded by Hamish Rollo	General Officer Commanding, Theatre Troops; 2008–2011	Succeeded by Shaun Burley
