= Tim Evans (British Army officer) =

British Army officer (born 1962)

Lieutenant General Tim Evans CB CBE DSO
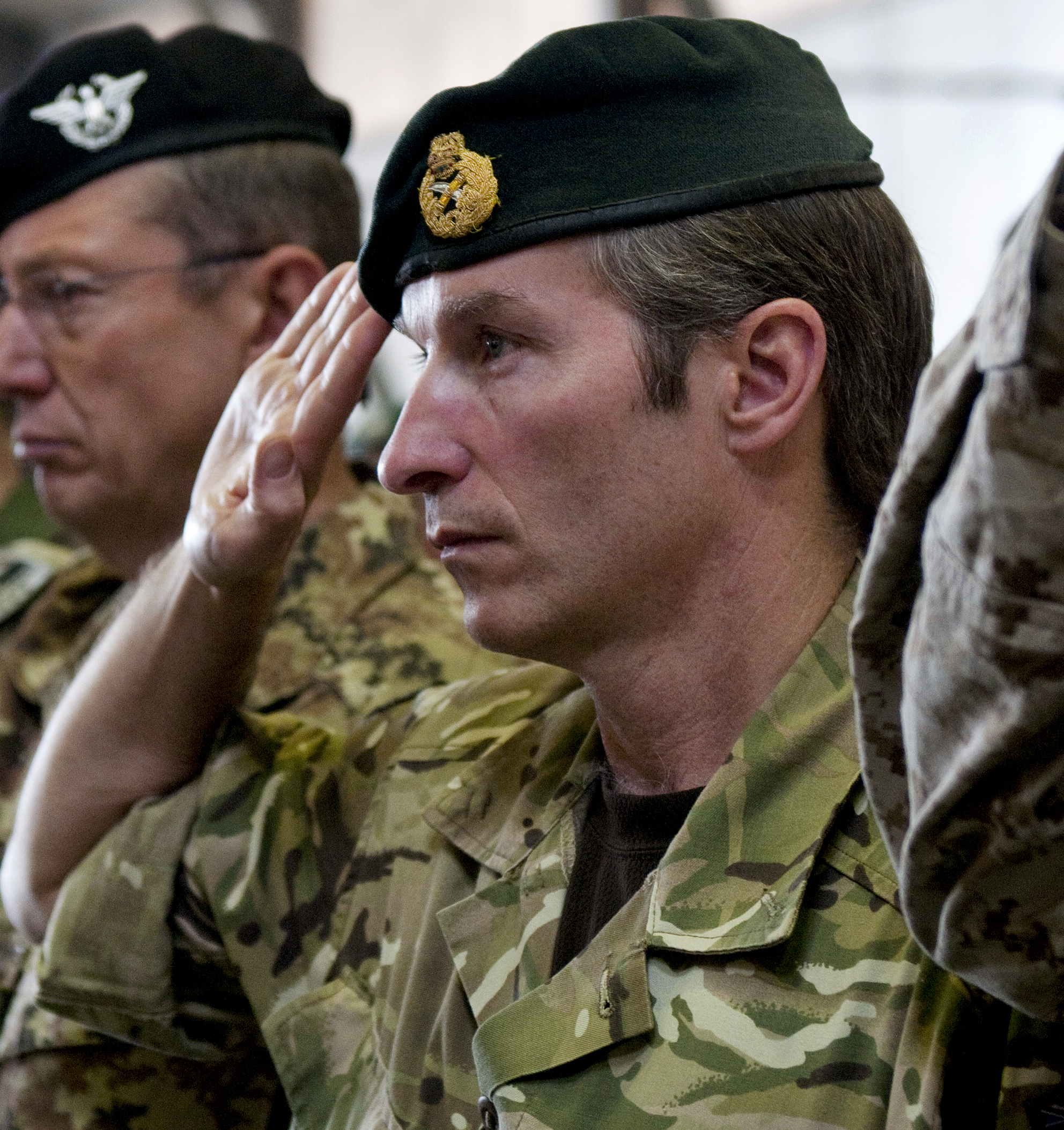
- Evans in uniform, 2011
- Born: 21 September 1962 (age 64); Iserlohn, West Germany
- Military career
- Allegiance: United Kingdom
- Branch: British Army
- Service years: 1980–2016
- Rank: Lieutenant General
- Service number: 511527
- Commands: Allied Rapid Reaction Corps; Royal Military Academy Sandhurst; 19th Light Brigade; 1st Battalion the Light Infantry
- Conflicts: Gulf War; Iraq War; War in Afghanistan
- Awards: Companion of the Order of the Bath; Commander of the Order of the British Empire; Companion of the Distinguished Service Order; Mentioned in Despatches

Lieutenant General Timothy Paul Evans, CB, CBE, DSO (born 21 September 1962) is a retired British Army officer, who served as Commandant of the Royal Military Academy Sandhurst from 2012 to 2013 and then commander of the Allied Rapid Reaction Corps from 2013 to 2016.

== Early life ==
Evans was educated at Monkton Combe School, near Bath in Somerset.

== Military career ==
From 5 September 1980, while studying at university, Evans was a second lieutenant (on probation) (University Cadetship). His commission was terminated on 16 October 1981. On 7 August 1982, upon graduation from the Royal Military Academy Sandhurst, he was commissioned into the Light Infantry as a second lieutenant. He was promoted to lieutenant on 7 August 1984, and to captain on 7 August 1988.

Evans passed Special Forces Selection in 1990. He served as a troop commander in 22 Special Air Service Regiment. He attended the Army Command and Staff College and was promoted to major on 30 September 1994.

Evans was promoted to lieutenant colonel on 30 June 2000 with seniority from that date, and posted to the newly opened Development, Concepts and Doctrine Centre. He was appointed commanding officer of 1st Battalion the Light Infantry in July 2001, after which he became chief of staff at Headquarters 3rd (UK) Division which was deployed to Southern Iraq. He was promoted to colonel on 30 June 2004 with seniority from 30 June 2004, and to brigadier on 31 December 2005 with seniority from 30 June 2005. He was then made commander of 19th Light Brigade, which was deployed to Iraq in 2006. He became Chief of Joint Force Operations at Permanent Joint Headquarters Northwood in 2008.

On 30 September 2009, Evans was promoted to major general and appointed chief of staff of the Allied Rapid Reaction Corps (ARRC). The ARRC was deployed to Afghanistan in January 2011 with Evans taking over as chief of staff at ISAF Joint Command. On 20 April 2012, he was appointed Commandant of the Royal Military Academy Sandhurst. He took over as commander of the Allied Rapid Reaction Corps in August 2013. Evans handed over his command on 25 July 2016 to Lieutenant General Tim Radford.

Evans retired from the British Army on 1 November 2016.

== Honours and decorations ==
On 29 June 1991, the then Captain Evans was Mentioned in Despatches "in recognition of gallant and distinguished services in the Gulf".

He was appointed Member of the Order of the British Empire (MBE) in the 2001 Birthday Honours and Commander of the Order of the British Empire (CBE) on 28 September 2012, "in recognition of gallant and distinguished services in Afghanistan during the period 1 October 2011 to 31 March 2012". He was appointed Companion of the Order of the Bath (CB) in the 2016 New Year Honours.

On 9 January 2006, he was appointed to the honorary position of Deputy Colonel of The Light Infantry. He relinquished the appointment on 1 February 2007. He was appointed Deputy Colonel of The Rifles on 1 April 2008.

Military offices
Preceded by Patrick Marriott	Commandant of the Royal Military Academy Sandhurst; 2012–2013	Succeeded by Stuart Skeates
Preceded by Sir James Bucknall	Commander Allied Rapid Reaction Corps; 2013–2016	Succeeded by Tim Radford
