= Sandy Storrie =

British Army officer (born 1962)

Lieutenant General Sandy Storrie CB CBE
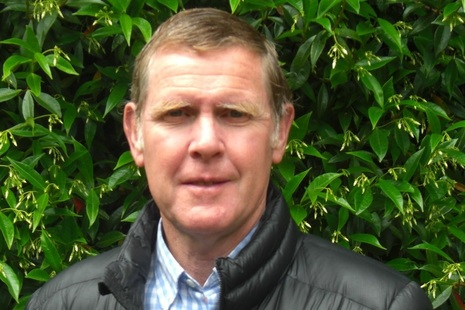
- Storrie in 2020
- Born: Alexander James Sanson Storrie; 1962 (age 63–64); Exeter, Devon, England
- Military career
- Allegiance: United Kingdom
- Branch: British Army
- Service years: 1982–2017
- Rank: Lieutenant General
- Nickname: Sandy
- Service number: 515787
- Commands: Devonshire and Dorset Regiment; 7th Armoured Brigade
- Conflicts: The Troubles; Iraq War; War in Afghanistan
- Awards: Commander of the Order of the British Empire; Companion of the Order of the Bath

Lieutenant General Alexander James Sanson Storrie, CB, CBE (born 1962) is a former senior British Army officer who served as Deputy Commander of the NATO-led Resolute Support Mission in Afghanistan.

== Early life and education ==
Storrie was born in Exeter and educated at Pembroke College, Oxford.

== Military career ==
Storrie was commissioned into the Devonshire and Dorset Regiment on 3 September 1982. He became commanding officer of the Devonshire and Dorset Regiment in 2002 and led the regiment while serving in Northern Ireland. He went on to be commander of 7th Armoured Brigade in 2007 and commanded it in Southern Iraq the following year. After that he became Assistant Chief of the Defence Staff (Military Strategy) in 2011, Deputy Commandant of the Royal College of Defence Studies in October 2013 and Deputy Commander Resolute Support Mission in April 2016.

== Honours ==
Storrie was appointed Commander of the Order of the British Empire (CBE) on 11 September 2009 in recognition of his contribution to Operation Telic XII. He was appointed Companion of the Order of the Bath (CB) in the 2017 New Year Honours.

Military offices
Preceded by Tim Radford	Deputy Commander Resolute Support Mission; 2016–Present	Succeeded by Richard Cripwell
