= 29 (Explosive Ordnance Disposal and Search) Group =

29th Engineer Group 29th Engineer Brigade
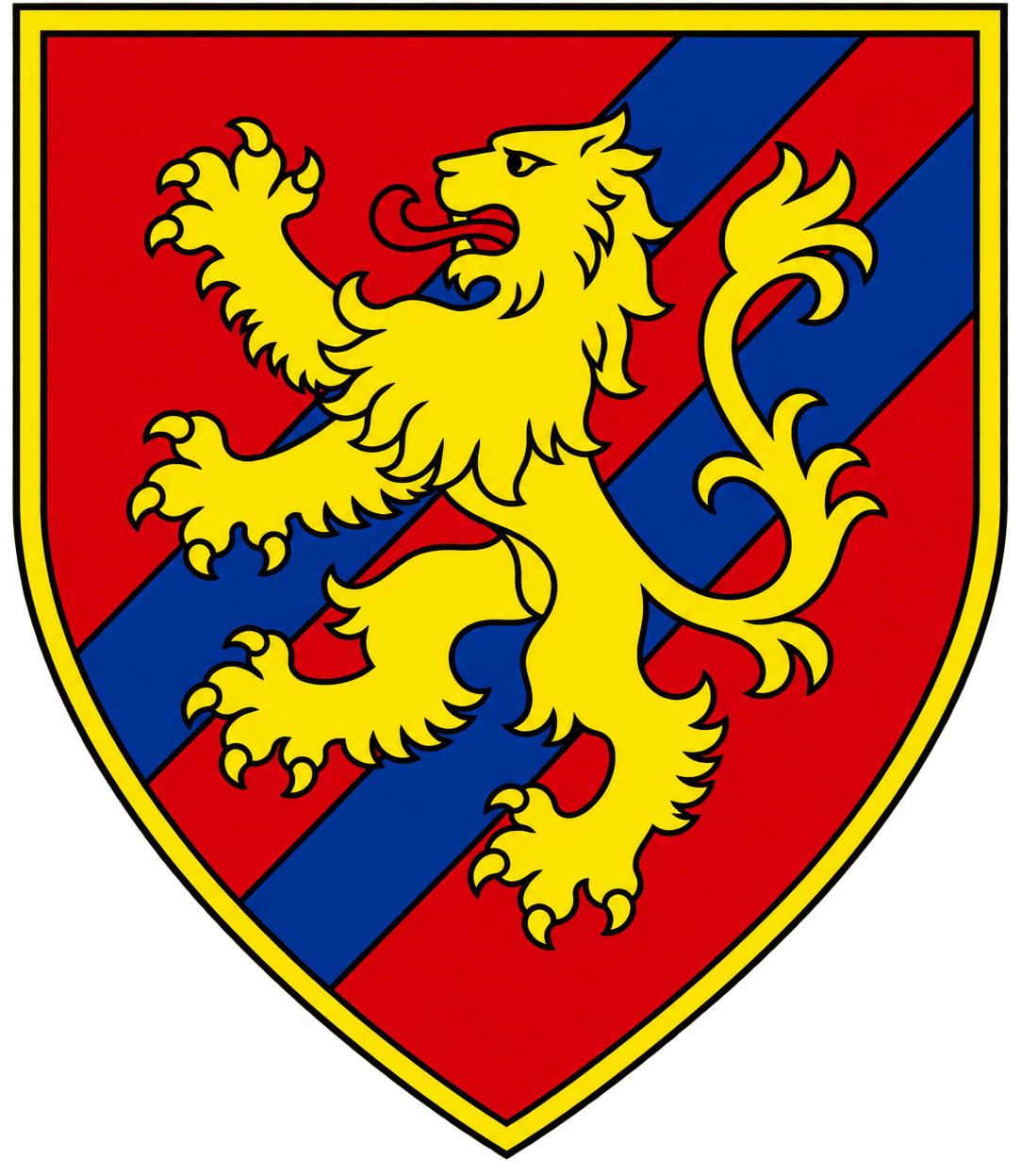
- Brigade badge during the Cold War
- Active: 1967–1992; 1997–present
- Country: United Kingdom
- Branch: British Army
- Type: Engineers
- Role: Corps Support Engineers
- Size: Brigade
- Part of: United Kingdom Land Forces (1972-1995)
- Garrison/HQ: Didcot

The 29 (Explosive Ordnance Disposal and Search) Group, formerly 29 Engineer Brigade, is an engineer formation of the British Army responsible for Explosive Ordnance Disposal and Search. Its headquarters are in Aldershot.

== History ==
The brigade had its origins as 29 Engineer Group formed in Glasgow in 1961. It was expanded and became 29th Engineer Brigade in 1967. By 1982, the brigade headquarters moved from Edinburgh to Imphal Barracks York with signals support at Fenham Barracks in Newcastle-upon-Tyne. Isby and Kamps wrote that around 1984-85 the brigade consisted of 72 Engineer Regiment, 73 Engineer Regiment, 74 Engineer Regiment and 105 (V) Plant Squadron, with 72 and 73 Regiments supporting 2nd Infantry Division and 74 Regiment supporting 1st Infantry Brigade.

In around 1989, the brigade's units included 71, 72, 73 Engineer Regiments, 105 Plant Squadron, 117 Field Support Squadron, and 873 Movement Lights Squadron. After the Options for Change reforms, the brigade disbanded.

In 1997, the brigade was reformed as 29 (Corps Support) Engineer Brigade from the Central Volunteer Headquarters, Royal Engineers. It was given responsibility for administering a series of Specialist Teams Royal Engineers ('STRE's). Its headquarters was established at Aldershot. It had been renamed 29 (Land Support) Engineer Group by 2008 and, because its main capability was Explosive Ordnance Disposal (EOD), it had been renamed 29 (Explosive Ordnance Disposal and Search) Group by 2011.

== Structure in 1997 ==
The following was the structure when it was reformed as a corps support engineer brigade in 1997:

- Royal Monmouthshire Militia Regiment, Royal Engineers
  - 101 Militia Headquarters Squadron
  - 100 Militia Field Squadron
  - 108 (Welsh) Militia Field Support Squadron
  - 225 (City of Birmingham) Militia Construction Squadron
  - 143 Plant Squadron
- 75 (Lancashire and Cheshire) Engineer Regiment, (Volunteers), Royal Engineers
  - 201 Headquarters Squadron
  - 107 (Lancashire and Cheshire) Field Squadron
  - 202 Field Squadron
  - 125 (Staffordshire) Field Support Squadron
- 101 (City of London) Engineer Regiment, Royal Engineers
  - 233 EOD Headquarters Squadron
  - 222 Field EOD Squadron
  - 221 Field EOD Squadron
  - 220 EOD Field Squadron
- 135 Topographical Squadron, Royal Engineers
- Military Works Force, Royal Engineers

After reformed as an engineer brigade for the ACE Rapid Reaction Corps, plans were made for the brigade to take under command other units from other ARRC engineer regiments. Therefore, under an operational deployment 101st (Netherlands) Engineer Battalion, 5th (Polish) Engineer Regiment (two battalions), 6th (Italian) Engineer Regiment, and A (Turkish) Engineer Company would all fall under its operational control.

== Organisation ==
The brigade existed as 29 (Explosive Ordnance Disposal and Search) Group under 8th Engineer Brigade. The structure is as follows:

- Headquarters at Didcot
- 11 (Explosive Ordnance Disposal & Search) Regiment, Royal Logistic Corps
  - Regimental Headquarters at Didcot
  - 421 Explosive Ordnance Disposal & Search Squadron at Didcot
  - 321 Explosive Ordnance Disposal & Search Squadron at Joint Helicopter Command Flying Station Aldergrove
  - 521 Explosive Ordnance Disposal Squadron at Catterick, Chester and Edinburgh
  - 621 Explosive Ordnance Disposal Squadron at RAF Northolt, Shorncliffe, Aldershot and Colchester
  - 721 Explosive Ordnance Disposal Squadron at Ashchurch, Tidworth and Nottingham
- 29 EOD&S Group Support Unit, Royal Engineers
  - Regimental Headquarters at Wimbish
  - Operational Support Group
  - Training Support Group
  - 29 Group REME Workshop
- 33 (Explosive Ordnance Disposal) Regiment, Royal Engineers
  - Regimental Headquarters at Wimbish
  - 49 Explosive Ordnance Disposal & Search Squadron (New Squadron)
  - 58 Field Squadron
  - 821 Field Squadron
- 35 Engineer Regiment, Royal Engineers (Note: Originally the regiment was supposed to disband, but did not happen.)
  - Regimental Headquarters at Wimbish
  - 15 EOD Field Squadron
  - 17 Field EOD Squadron
  - 21 EOD Field Squadron
- 101 (City of London) Explosive Ordnance Disposal and Search Engineer Regiment, Royal Engineers (V)
  - Regimental Headquarters at Catford
  - 217 (London) Explosive Ordnance Disposal Field Squadron at Ilford, Southend, and White City
  - 221 Explosive Ordnance Disposal Field Squadron at Catford and Rochester
  - 579 Explosive Ordnance Disposal Field Squadron at Royal Tunbridge Wells, Reigate, and Rochester
- 1st Military Working Dog Regiment
  - Regimental Headquarters at Luffenham
  - 101 Squadron at Aldershot
  - 102 Squadron
  - 103 Squadron at North Luffenham
  - 104 Squadron (V) at North Luffenham
  - 105 Squadron (V) at North Luffenham

The group is tasked with "[Supporting] both deployed operations and Homeland Defence. The Group locates and disposes of conventional and improvised explosive threats. It provides technical expertise to ensure that the Army's ammunition is fit for purpose and all forms of Search capability including Military Working Dog support."

== Group Commanders ==
Group Commanders included:

- 1997–1998: Col. Robert J. Griffiths
- 1998–2005: Col. John M. Heron
- 2005–2007: Col. Nigel H.W. Fenn
- 2007–2008: Col. Stephen P. Hodder
- 2009–2012: Col. Jonathan A.H. Welch
- 2012–2017: Col. A. Gareth Bex
- 2017–2018: Col. Adam D. McRae MBE
- 2018–2021: Col. Daniel A. Reyland
- 2021–2024: Col. Brian K. Howard OBE
- 2024–2026: Col. Darren J. Fisher MBE

== Sources ==
- Hewitson, T L (2006). Weekend Warriors. Tempus Publishing. ISBN 0-7524-3756-9.
- Isby, David C.; Kamps, Charles Jr. (1985). Armies of NATO's Central Front. Jane's Publishing Company Ltd. ISBN 0-7106-0341-X.
- Rinaldi, Richard A.; Watson, Graham E. (29 August 2018). The Corps of Royal Engineers: Organization and Units 1889-2018. Independently Published. ISBN 978-1-7179-0180-4.
