= James Shaw (British Army major general) =

Major General James Shaw CBE
- Military career
- Allegiance: United Kingdom
- Branch: British Army
- Service years: 1972–2005
- Rank: Major General
- Commands: 14 Signal Regiment; 1st Signal Brigade; Theatre Troops
- Conflicts: Gulf War; Bosnian War
- Awards: Commander of the Order of the British Empire

Major General James Michael Shaw CBE is a former British Army officer who became General Officer Commanding, Theatre Troops.

== Military career ==
Shaw was commissioned into the Royal Corps of Signals in 1972. He served as commanding officer of 14 Signal Regiment (Electronic Warfare) during the Gulf War in 1991. He went on to be commander of 1st Signal Brigade which was deployed to Bosnia in 1996, Commander Communications and Information Systems at Headquarters Land Command in 1998 and then became General Officer Commanding, Theatre Troops in 2001 before retiring in January 2005.

Military offices
Preceded by New Post	General Officer Commanding, Theatre Troops; 2001–2004	Succeeded by Tim Cross
