= 101st Operational Sustainment Brigade =

101st Logistic Brigade 101st Operational Sustainment Brigade
- Brigade tactical recognition flash
- Active: 1999 – present
- Country: United Kingdom
- Branch: British Army
- Type: Logistics Support Brigade
- Size: Brigade
- Part of: 3rd (United Kingdom) Division
- Brigade HQ: Saint Omer Barracks, Aldershot Garrison

101st Operational Sustainment Brigade is a logistic brigade within 3rd (United Kingdom) Division of the British Army, formed from the Combat Service Support Group in 1999. The brigade is held in high readiness and is described as a "vanguard support brigade".

== History ==
In 1999, Combat Service Support Group (United Kingdom) was formed under operational command of 3rd (United Kingdom) Mechanised Division.

Under the LANDmark reorganisation from 2002, the group was redesignated as 101st Logistic Brigade and placed under Force Troops Command, but remained under operational command of the 3rd (UK) Mechanised Division still. Under the Army 2020 plan, the Brigade re-subordinated from HQ Force Troops Command to 3rd (United Kingdom) Division permanently on 1 December 2014.

== Future ==
Under the Future Soldier programme, the brigade will be redesignated as the 101st Operational Sustainment Brigade. The future role of the brigade has been described as follows: "101st Operational Sustainment Brigade will provide the 3rd Division's logistics and equipment support. It will include the Army's heavy equipment transport and powerpack repair capability; ensuring the armoured BCTs can deploy rapidly and sustain high intensity operations."

== List of structures ==
Combat Service Support Group (United Kingdom) (2002)

Combat Service Support Group (United Kingdom), at Buller Barracks, Aldershot Garrison

- 101st Logistic Brigade Headquarters and 261 Signal Squadron, Royal Corps of Signals, at Buller Barracks, Aldershot Garrison
- 9th Supply Regiment, Royal Logistic Corps, at Buckley Barracks, Chippenham
- 10th Queen's Own Gurkha Transport Regiment, Royal Logistic Corps, at New Normandy Barracks, Aldershot Garrison
- 27th Transport Regiment, Royal Logistic Corps, at Ward Barracks, Bulford Camp
- 4th General Support Medical Regiment, Royal Army Medical Corps, at Browning Barracks, Aldershot Garrison
  - B (220 (1st Home Counties)) Medical Squadron (V), in Maidstone
  - C (222nd (East Midlands)) Medical Squadron (V), in Leicester
- 101 Military Working Dogs Support Unit, Royal Army Veterinary Corps, at Buller Barracks, Aldershot Garrison
- 4th Regiment, Royal Military Police, at Arnhem Barracks, Aldershot Garrison
  - 160 Provost Company, at Provost Barracks, Aldershot Garrison
  - 116 Provost Company (V), in Cannock and Belle Vue, Manchester
  - 253 (London) Provost Company (V), in Tulse Hill and Southampton

101st Logistic Brigade (2012)

101st Logistic Brigade, at Saint Omer Barracks, Aldershot Garrison

- 1st Close Support Logistic Regiment, Royal Logistic Corps, at Saint David's Barracks, Bicester Garrison – tasked with supporting 12th Armoured Infantry Bde
- 3rd Close Support Logistic Regiment, Royal Logistic Corps, at Aldershot Garrison – tasked with supporting 1st Armoured Infantry Bde
- 4th Close Support Logistic Regiment, Royal Logistic Corps, at Dalton Barracks, Abingdon-on-Thames – tasked with supporting 12th Armoured Infantry Bde
- 9th Theatre Logistic Regiment, Royal Logistic Corps, at Buckley Barracks, Chippenham – tasked with supporting 20th Armoured Infantry Bde
- 10th Queen's Own Gurkha Theatre Logistic Regiment, Royal Logistic Corps, at Gale Barracks, Aldershot Garrison – tasked with supporting 1st Armoured Infantry Bde
- 27th Theatre Logistic Regiment, Royal Logistic Corps, at Abingdon – tasked with supporting 12th Armoured Infantry Bde
- 151st (Greater London) Transport Regiment, Royal Logistic Corps (V), in Croydon – paired with 3 & 10 Regiments RLC
- 154th (Scottish) Transport Regiment, Royal Logistic Corps (V), in Dunfermline – paired with 4 & 27 Regiments RLC
- 156th (North West) Supply Regiment, Royal Logistic Corps (V), in Liverpool
- 157th (Welsh) Transport Regiment, Royal Logistic Corps (V), in Cardiff – paired with 1 & 9 Regiment RLC
- 3rd Armoured Close Support Battalion, Royal Electrical and Mechanical Engineers, at Assaye Barracks, Tidworth Camp – tasked with supporting 20th Armoured Infantry Bde
- 4th Armoured Close Support Battalion, Royal Electrical and Mechanical Engineers, at Jellalabad Barracks, Tidworth Camp – tasked with supporting 12th Armoured Infantry Bde
- 5th Force Support Battalion, Royal Electrical and Mechanical Engineers, at Kewndrew Barracks, Cottesmore
- 6th Armoured Close Support Battalion, Royal Electrical and Mechanical Engineers, at Delhi Barracks, Tidworth Camp – tasked with supporting 1st Armoured Infantry Bde
- 103rd Battalion, Royal Electrical and Mechanical Engineers (V), in Crawley – paired with 4 Battalion REME
- 105th Battalion, Royal Electrical and Mechanical Engineers (V), in Bristol – paired with 3 Battalion REME
- 1st Armoured Medical Regiment, Royal Army Medical Corps, at Bhurtpore Barracks, Tidworth Camp
- 4th Armoured Medical Regiment, Royal Army Medical Corps, at Normandy Barracks, Aldershot Garrison
- 5th Armoured Medical Regiment, Royal Army Medical Corps, at Tidworth Camp

101st Logistic Brigade (2022)

101st Logistics Brigade, at Saint Omer Barracks, Aldershot Garrison

- 1st Close Support Logistic Regiment, Royal Logistic Corps, at Saint David's Barracks, Bicester (supporting 1 Armoured Infantry Brigade)
- 3rd Close Support Logistic Regiment, Royal Logistic Corps, at Dalton Barracks, Abingdon-on-Thames (supporting 20 Armoured Infantry Brigade)
- 9th Theatre Logistic Regiment, Royal Logistic Corps, at Buckley Barracks, Chippenham (supporting 20 Armoured Infantry Brigade)
- 10th (Queen's Own Gurkha) Theatre Logistic Regiment, Royal Logistic Corps, at Gale Barracks, Aldershot Garrison (supporting 12 Armoured Infantry Brigade)
- 27th Theatre Logistic Regiment, Royal Logistic Corps, at Travers Barracks, Aldershot Garrison (supporting 1 Armoured Infantry Brigade)
- 151st (Greater London) Transport Regiment, Royal Logistic Corps (V), in Croydon – paired with 10 Regiment RLC
- 154th (Scottish) Transport Regiment, Royal Logistic Corps (V), in Dunfermline – paired with 27 Regiment RLC
- 157th (Welsh) Transport Regiment, Royal Logistic Corps (V), in Cardiff – paired with 9 Regiment RLC
- 156th (North West) Transport Regiment, Royal Logistic Corps (V), in Liverpool
- 4th Armoured Close Support Battalion, Royal Electrical and Mechanical Engineers, at Jellalabad Barracks, Tidworth Camp (supporting 12 Armoured Infantry Brigade)
- 6th Armoured Close Support Battalion, Royal Electrical and Mechanical Engineers, at Delhi Barracks, Tidworth Camp (supporting 1 Armoured Infantry Brigade)
- 102nd Force Support Battalion, Royal Electrical and Mechanical Engineers (V), in Newton Aycliffe – paired with 4 Armoured Close Support Battalion REME
- 103rd Force Support Battalion, Royal Electrical and Mechanical Engineers (V), in Nottingham – paired with 3 Armoured Close Support Battalion REME
- 29th Pre-Hospital Divisional Medical Group, at Bulford Camp – led by a Colonel, "Responsible for the maintenance of combat effectiveness of Force Elements at Readiness and oversight of medical provision to 3rd (United Kingdom) Division, and the outputs of 1, 4 and 5 Armoured Medical Regiments."
  - 1st Armoured Medical Regiment, Royal Army Medical Corps, at Bhurtpore Barracks, Tidworth Camp
  - 4th Armoured Medical Regiment, Royal Army Medical Corps, at Bhurtpore Barracks, Tidworth Camp
  - 5th Armoured Medical Regiment, Royal Army Medical Corps, at Gaza Barracks, Catterick Garrison

101st Operational Sustainment Brigade (2024)

101st Operational Sustainment Brigade, at Saint Omer Barracks, Aldershot Garrison

- 10th Queen's Own Gurkha Divisional Logistic Regiment, Royal Logistic Corps, at Gale Barracks, Aldershot Garrison
- 27th Divisional Logistic Regiment, Royal Logistic Corps, at Travers Barracks, Aldershot Garrison (+1 squadron by Jan. 2023)
- 151st (Greater London) Transport Regiment, Royal Logistic Corps (V), in Croydon
- 156th (North West) Supply Regiment, Royal Logistic Corps (V), in Liverpool
- 157th (Welsh) Transport Regiment, Royal Logistic Corps (V), in Cardiff
- 5th Force Support Battalion, Royal Electrical and Mechanical Engineers, at Prince Philip Barracks, Lyneham (to join in 2023, from 104 Logistic Support Brigade)
- 103rd Force Support Battalion, Royal Electrical and Mechanical Engineers (V), in Northampton – paired with 5 Force Support Battalion REME
- 253 (London) Provost Company, Royal Military Police (V), in Tulse Hill
