= Hamish Rollo =

Major General Hamish Rollo CBE
- Born: 21 May 1955
- Died: 26 March 2009 (aged 53)
- Military career
- Allegiance: United Kingdom
- Branch: British Army
- Service years: 1973 - 2009
- Rank: Major General
- Commands: 22 Engineer Regiment; 19th Mechanized Brigade; Theatre Troops
- Conflicts: Gulf War; Bosnian War; Kosovo War
- Awards: Commander of the Order of the British Empire

Major General Norman Hamish Rollo CBE (21 May 1955 – 26 March 2009) was a British Army officer who became General Officer Commanding, Theatre Troops.

== Military career ==
Educated at Radley College and the Royal Military College of Science at Shrivenham, Rollo was commissioned into the Royal Engineers in 1973. He served in the Gulf War in 1990 before becoming commanding officer of 22 Engineer Regiment in January 1995 in which role he was deployed to Bosnia with IFOR. He went on to be Chief of Staff at Headquarters 3rd Mechanised Division in January 1997 and returned to Bosnia before being deployed to Kosovo. He became commander of 19th Mechanized Brigade in April 2000, commander of the Multi-National Brigade (Centre) in Kosovo in 2001 and Assistant Chief of Staff Crisis and Deliberate Planning at Permanent Joint Headquarters in Northwood in December 2001. He went on to be Assistant Commandant (Land) at the Joint Services Command and Staff College in November 2003 and General Officer Commanding, Theatre Troops in November 2006. In 2006 he was given the colonelcy of the Duke of Lancaster's Regiment.

He died of natural causes on 26 March 2009 and was buried at Tidworth Military Cemetery.

Military offices
Preceded by Tim Cross	General Officer Commanding, Theatre Troops; 2006–2008	Succeeded by Bruce Brealey
