= St George's Barracks, North Luffenham =

British Army installation in Rutland, England

St George's Barracks
- North Luffenham
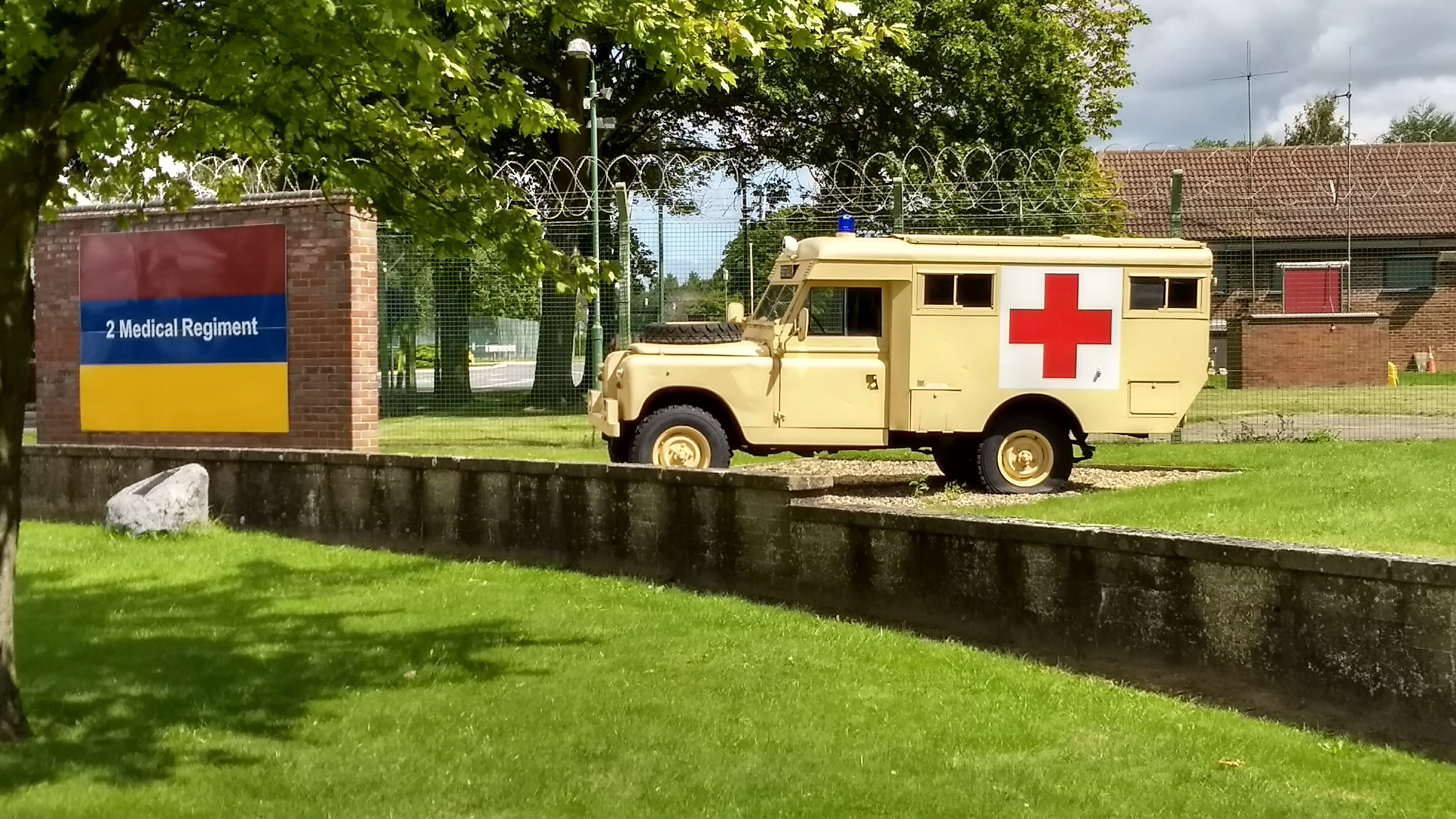
- Gate Guardian Military ambulance, St George's Barracks

Site information
- Type: Barracks
- Owner: Ministry of Defence
- Operator: British Army

Location
- Location within Rutland
- Coordinates: 52°37′56″N 00°36′38″W

Site history
- Built: 1998
- In use: 1998-Present

Garrison information
- Occupants: 1 Military Working Dog Regiment

St George's Barracks is a British Army installation near to the village of North Luffenham in Rutland, England. It is set to close in 2026.

== History ==
The barracks was established on the site of the former RAF North Luffenham airfield in 1998. It became the home of the Royal Regiment of Fusiliers in 1999, of the King's Own Royal Border Regiment in 2003 and of the 16th Regiment Royal Artillery in 2007. In April 2013, 16th Regiment Royal Artillery received the Freedom of Oakham while based at the barracks. In July 2014, 16th Regiment Royal Artillery moved to Baker Barracks, Thorney Island.

In late 2014, 2 Medical Regiment, Royal Army Medical Corps and 1 Military Working Dogs Regiment, Royal Army Veterinary Corps moved into St George's Barracks.

2 Medical Regiment was disbanded in 2018 at St George's Barracks, leaving the 1st Military Working Dog Regiment as the sole occupants.

== Future ==
In November 2016, the Ministry of Defence announced that the site would close between 2020 and 2021. This was later extended to 2022, and once more to 2026.

It is planned to relocate 1st Military Working Dogs Regiment to Kendrew Barracks, also in Rutland.

== Current units ==
The following notable units are based at St George's Barracks.

Royal Army Veterinary Corps

- 1st Military Working Dog Regiment
  - 101 Military Working Dog Squadron (Reserves)
  - 102 Military Working Dog Squadron
  - 103 Headquarters & Support Military Working Dog Squadron
  - 104 Military Working Dog Squadron
  - 105 Military Working Dog Squadron
