= 1st Military Working Dog Regiment =

British military unit

1st Military Working Dog Regiment, RAVC
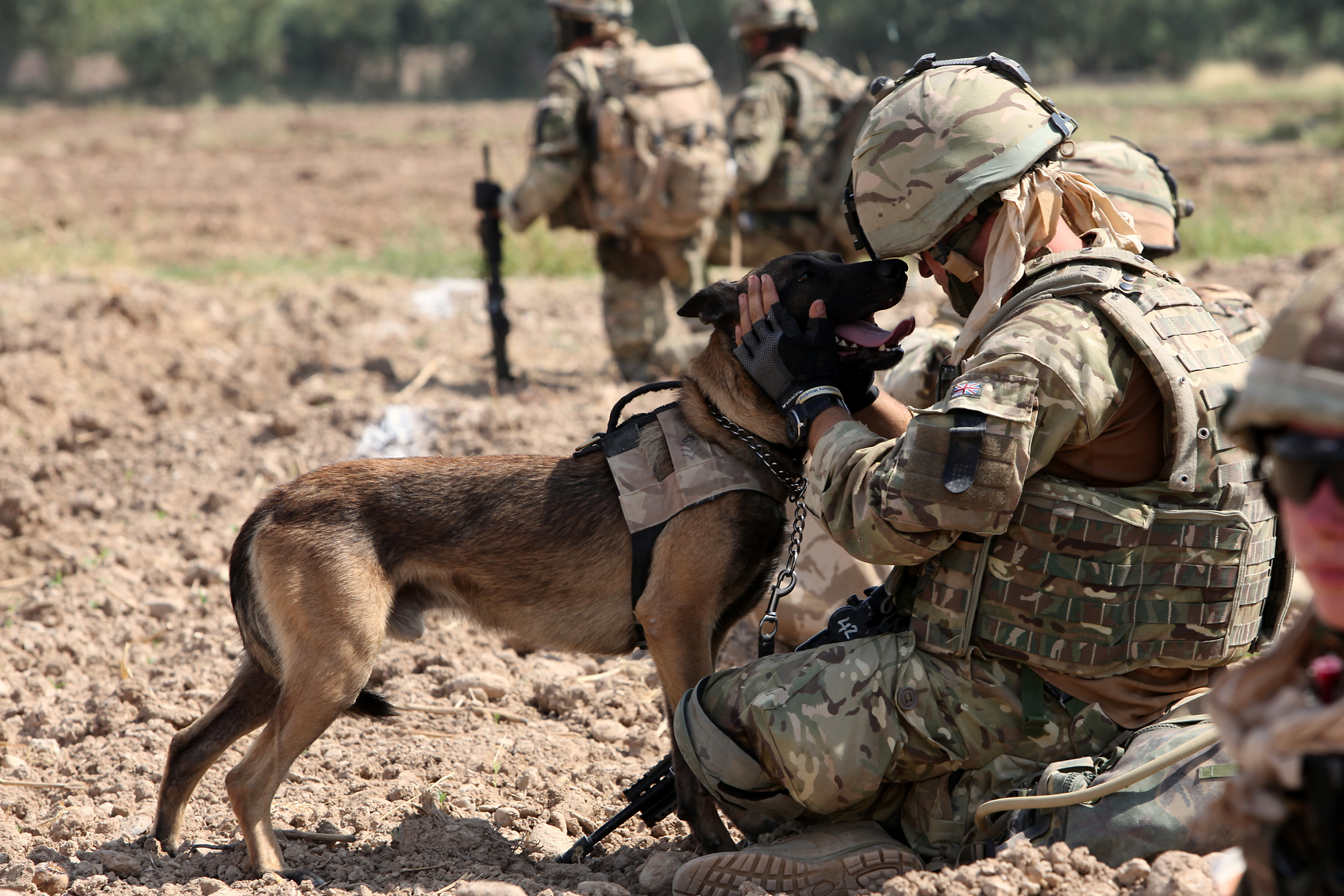
- A dog handler and dog from 103 Military Working Dog Squadron in Afghanistan during 2011
- Active: 2010–present
- Country: United Kingdom
- Branch: British Army
- Size: 284 regular personnel, 112 reservists, and 125 military working dogs.
- Part of: 8th Engineer Brigade
- Regimental Headquarters: St George's Barracks, North Luffenham
- Motto: Vires in Varietate - Strength in Diversity
- Engagements: Iraq War; War in Afghanistan
- Website: Regimental webpage

The 1st Military Working Dog Regiment, Royal Army Veterinary Corps is a British Army working dog unit. It is responsible for providing trained dogs and handlers to support British Armed Forces on operations in the UK and overseas. The regiment holds the Army’s only deployable MWD and veterinary capability.

The regiment was formed on 26 March 2010, and its headquarters is located at St George's Barracks, North Luffenham.

== History ==
The 1st Military Working Dog Regiment was established in 2010 to command the Army's five military working dog support units. Until the regimental headquarters had been established, these units were independent.

=== Deployments ===
==== Cyprus ====
The Cyprus Military Working Dog Troop is based at Episkopi Garrison and provides protection tasks, vehicle search tasks and arms and explosives search tasks.

==== Afghanistan ====
The regiment was deployed to Afghanistan on Operation Herrick, carrying out a range of tasks in theatre that included patrolling the bases where fellow British soldiers were based, searching vehicles at checkpoints and going out on patrol on the front line. At Camp Bastion, the main UK base in Helmand Province, the dogs were housed in air-conditioned kennels, which also had heating for the cold winter nights, and each dog had a run area and covered sleeping area in their individual kennel. When based out of forward operating bases, the dogs slept with their handlers. Numerous working dogs from 1MWD have received the Dickin Medal for conspicuous gallantry or devotion to duty while serving in Afghanistan.

==== Mali ====
The regiment supported Operation Newcombe in Mali, deploying with a High Assurance Search Dog Team.

==== Fall of Kabul ====
During the fall of Kabul, the regiment deployed eight teams and one veterinary officer as part of an Air Manoeuvre Battle Group from 16 Air Assault Brigade Combat Team in August 2021. The teams engaged in crowd control at Kabul International Airport and also patrolled the airport perimeter and deployed specialist arms explosives search teams to search a large volume of baggage.

== Roles ==
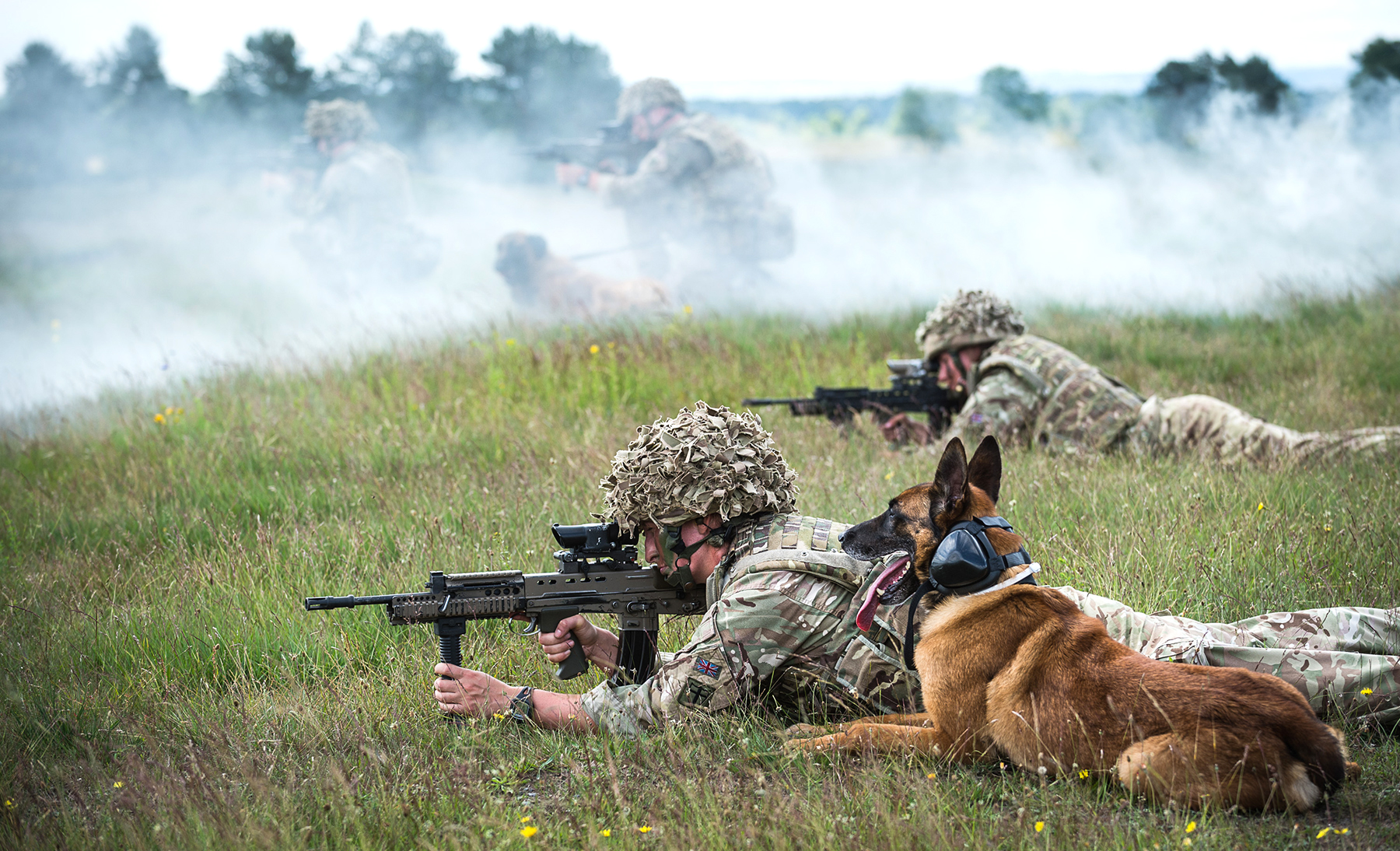
102 Military Working Dogs Squadron taking part in a live fire exercise on the Sennelager Ranges in Germany.

The regiment forms part of 29 (Explosive Ordnance Disposal and Search) Group, under 8th Engineer Brigade. Each military working dog has a name, service number, health and training record, and assigned military veterinarian. The dogs, handlers, and vets are trained at the Defence Animal Training Regiment.

=== Arms Explosive Search ===
1MWD utilise AES dogs, primarily Labradors and Spaniels, to provide commanders with additional assurance during routine patrolling or deliberate strike operations and allow freedom of movement. They can be used to search urban and rural areas, buildings, compounds, vehicles, routes, roads, railways, and personal effects to detect the presence of weapons, explosives, and ammunition. AES can assist in searching at vehicle check points (VCP), incident control points (ICP), helicopter landing sites (HLS), and cordon positions.

=== High Assurance Search ===
1MWD utilise HAS dogs, primarily Belgian Malinois, within a Defence Advanced Search Team. They provide the detection capability of Improvised Explosive Devices during high-risk search operations, delivering a high intensity slow and systematic search of given areas, routes, train lines, vulnerable points and areas, and compound exteriors.

=== Patrol ===
1MWD utilise Patrol dogs, primarily Belgian Malinois and German Shepherds, as a Force Protection asset, providing commanders with a high-profile visual deterrent that can detect, pursue, and detain an intruder with sub-lethal force. Patrol dogs use their superior visual, audio, and olfactory senses to highlight the presence of enemy forces or unidentified personnel within an area of responsibility. They can be employed as static or patrolling sentry, within an ambush, crowd control or as an escort for detainees.

== Structure ==
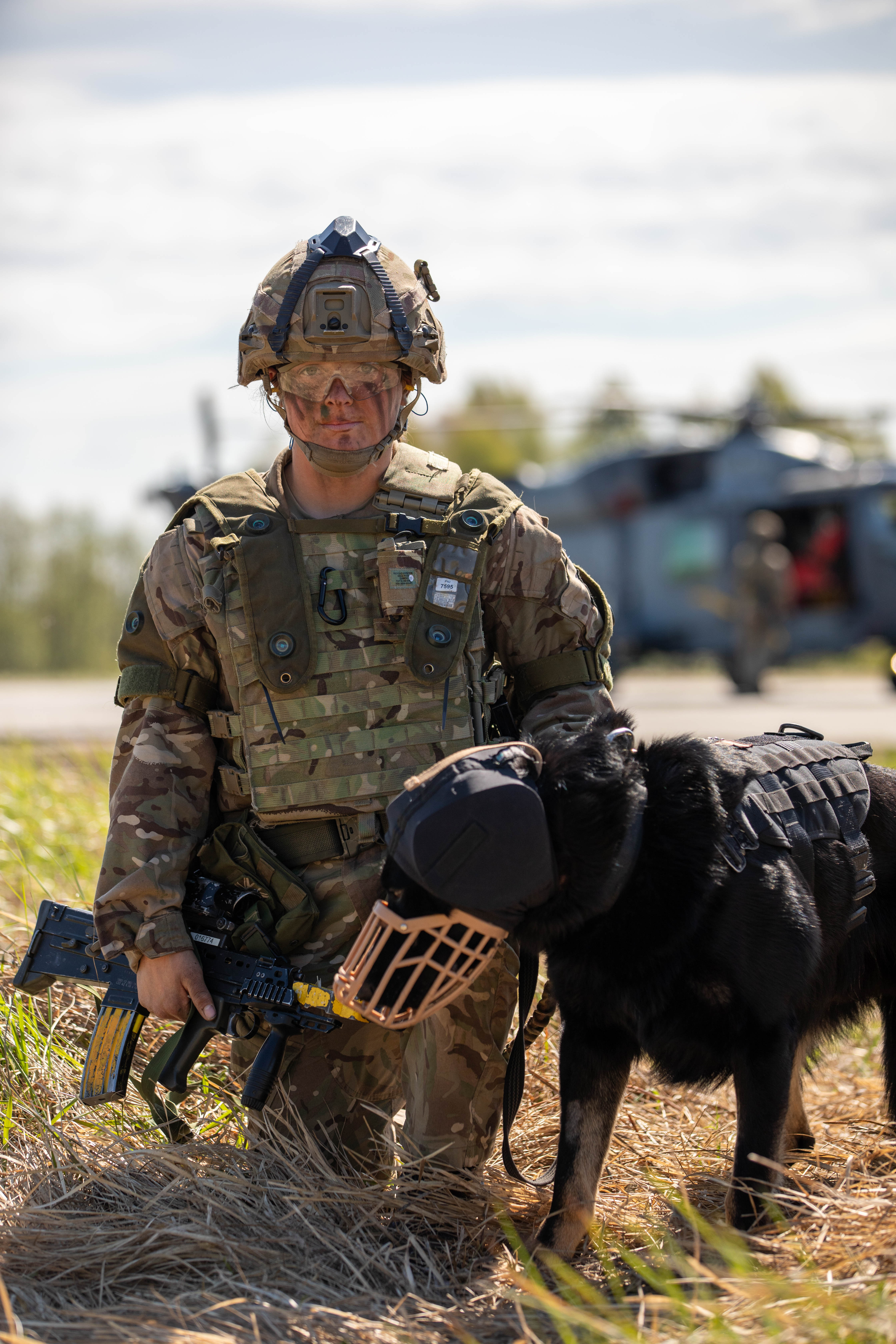
A dog handler and dog prior to boarding a helicopter during an exercise in 2024

The regiment currently comprises the following sub-units:

- Regimental Headquarters, at St George's Barracks, North Luffenham.
- 101 Military Working Dog Squadron. (Nationally recruited Army Reserves)
- 102 Military Working Dog Squadron.
- 103 HQ & Support Military Working Dog Squadron.
  - Cyprus Military Working Dog Troop, at Episkopi Garrison
- 104 Military Working Dog Squadron.

== Future ==
By 2026, the regiment will relocate to Kendrew Barracks in Cottesmore, Rutland. 1MWD will be based alongside 1st and 2nd Battalions Royal Anglian Regiment and 7 Regiment RLC. To enable their relocation, 15 new buildings will be constructed on the site, including a veterinary centre, kennels, accommodation blocks, squadron offices, gym, and training facilities. This is expected to complete in December 2025, to enable the permanent disposal of St George's Barracks in 2026.

== See also ==
- Dogs in warfare
