= Headquarters South East (United Kingdom) =

Regional command based in North East England

- Active: 2015—Present
- Country: United Kingdom
- Branch: British Army
- Type: Regional Point of Command
- Part of: Regional Command
- Garrison/HQ: Aldershot

Headquarters South East is a regional point of command based in South East England. The command administers the reserve units based in its area and also provided the military support HQ for the police and civilian population in the area.

== History ==
Under the Army 2020, the 2nd (South East) Brigade, which had regional responsibility for the south east counties (Kent, Surrey, and Sussex), and 145th (South) Brigade, which had regional responsibility for the south-central region (Thames Valley (Berkshire, Buckinghamshire, and Oxfordshire), Hampshire, and the Isle of Wight) were merged to form the new 11th Infantry Brigade and Headquarters South East. Under the Army 2020 Refine reorganisation, 11th Infantry Brigade and Headquarters South East remained responsible for reserve units in the south east of England.

On 30 November 2021, the Future Soldier changes were announced, under which 11th Infantry Brigade became 11th Security Force Assistance Brigade and dropped its regional commitments, which were placed under a colonel's command.

== Structure ==
=== Headquarters South East ===
- Headquarters South East, at Montgomery House, Aldershot Garrison
  - Headquarters South East Cadet Training Team (East), at Longmoore Barracks, Longmoor
  - Headquarters South East Cadet Training Team (West), at Worth Down Barracks, Winchester
  - Buckinghamshire Army Cadet Force, in Buckingham
  - Hampshire and Isle of Wight Army Cadet Force, in Winchester
  - Kent Army Cadet Force, in Maidstone
  - Oxfordshire Army Cadet Force, in Bicester
  - Royal County of Berkshire Army Cadet Force, at Brock Barracks, Reading
  - Surrey Battalion, Army Cadet Force, in Farncombe
  - Sussex Army Cadet Force, in Brighton
