= Headquarters East (United Kingdom) =

Regional command based in the East of England

- Active: 2015—2024
- Country: United Kingdom
- Branch: British Army
- Type: Regional Point of Command
- Part of: Regional Command
- Garrison/HQ: Chilwell

Headquarters East was a regional point of command based in the East Midlands and East of England. The command administered the reserve units based in its area and also provided the military support HQ for the police and civilian population in the area.

== History ==
Under Army 2020, 7th Armoured Brigade merged with 49 (East) Brigade on 13 February 2015. The latter became "Headquarters East" which was the regional point of contact for the following counties: Lincolnshire, South Yorkshire, Nottinghamshire, Leicestershire, Rutland, Northamptonshire, Bedfordshire, Hertfordshire, Essex, Suffolk, Norfolk, and Cambridgeshire. Under the Army 2020 Refine reorganisation, 7th Infantry Brigade and Headquarters East remained responsible for reserve units in the East Midlands and East of England.

In 2024, under the Future Soldier reforms, the unit merged with Headquarters West Midlands to form Headquarters Centre at Kendrew Barracks.

== Structure ==
- Headquarters East, Chetwynd Barracks, Chilwell
  - Cambridge University Officers' Training Corps (Army Reserve), in Cambridge
  - East Midlands University Officers' Training Corps (Army Reserve), in Nottingham
  - 7th Infantry Brigade & Headquarters East Cadet Training Team, at Kendrew Barracks, Cottesmore
  - Bedfordshire and Hertfordshire Army Cadet Force, in Hertford
  - Cambridgeshire Army Cadet Force, in Waterbeach
  - Essex Army Cadet Force, in Chelmsford
  - Leicestershire, Northamptonshire, and Rutland Army Cadet Force, in South Wigston
  - Lincolnshire Army Cadet Force, at Sobraon Barracks, Lincoln
  - Norfolk Army Cadet Force, in Dereham
  - Northamptonshire Army Cadet Force, in Northampton
  - Suffolk Army Cadet Force, in Ipswich
