= Kent Army Cadet Force =

Cadet force county of the United Kingdom

- Active: March 1963?–present
- Country: United Kingdom
- Branch: British Army: Army Cadet Force
- Type: Registered Volunteer Youth Organisation
- Role: To provide pre-training and experience of life in the British Army
- Size: County (Note: In the Army Cadet Force, a 'County' is equivalent to an army battalion)
- Part of: Headquarters South East
- County HQ: Maidstone
- Website: Kent Army Cadets

Commanders
- Honorary Colonel: Sir Hugh Robertson

Insignia
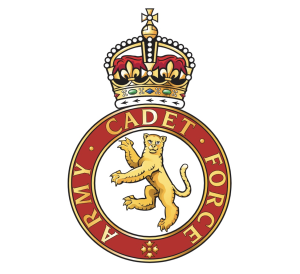
- Army Cadet Force Badge

The Kent Army Cadet Force (Kent ACF) is the county cadet force for Kent and Medway which operates as part of the Army Cadet Force. Since 2014, the county has been part of Headquarters South East, and is divided into four companies (one entitled a squadron for the Royal Engineers).

== Background ==
In 1863, along with the formation of the Volunteer Force, the first government sanctioned cadet groups were allowed to be formed. These groups would mostly be formed in connection with existing volunteer companies and battalions. Following the Territorial and Reserve Forces Act 1907 which organised the former Volunteer Force into a coherent organisation, known as the Territorial Force (TF), the cadets were expanded. Each company consisted of no less than 30 cadets, and four of these companies formed a "Cadet Battalion", the predecessors to the modern "Cadet County".

Unlike their modern successors, the first cadet battalions were administered by their local County Territorial Force Associations, and rarely ever came under an "army command". However, following changes to the organisation of the Cadets, in 1923 all cadet forces were taken under complete control of the County Associations.

Below is a list of the cadet battalions which had been formed in Kent during the reorganisation of the TF and into 1939:

- Kent Public Secondary Schools Cadet Battalion
- Kent Fortress Royal Engineers 1st Cadet Battalion
- Kent Fortress Royal Engineers 2nd Cadet Battalion
- 1st Volunteer Cadet Corps Battalion, East Kent Regiment (The Buffs)
- 1st Cadet Battalion, The Queen's Own Royal West Kent Regiment
- 2nd Cadet Battalion, The Queen's Own Royal West Kent Regiment

The first mention of the Kent Army Cadet Force was in 1964 in the London Gazette. The supplement for 9 October 1964 states the restoration of the former commander of the county to the Territorial Army, but does not provide an appointment date. A further mention is made in the 15th March 1963 supplement showing an officer commissioned from the county.

Under the Army 2020 programme, the 2nd (South East) Infantry Brigade was merged with 145th (South) Brigade to form the new 11th Infantry Brigade and Headquarters South East on 1 April 2014. Following these changes, the county left the control of 2nd (South East) Brigade and joined 11th Infantry Brigade as part of Headquarters South East.

As of December 2021, each Army Cadet Force county reports to their local brigade deputy commander, or in the case of independent regional headquarters the commander. However, for administrative duties each cadet county reports to Commander Cadets, who is a senior 1* Brigadier part of Headquarters, Regional Command.

== Organisation ==
As of December 2021, the Kent Army Cadet Force consists of appx. 850 cadets and 200 adult volunteers in 35 detachments spread throughout the county of Kent. Each Army Cadet Force 'county' is in-fact a battalion, and each 'detachment' equivalent to that of a platoon.

The organisation of the county in 2021 was as follows:

- County Headquarters, at Yeomanry House, Maidstone
  - Kent Army Cadet Force County Training Team

| Detachment | Affiliation | Location | Borough/District | County | Postal Code |
A Company
| A Company Headquarters | Encompassing East Kent (Borough of Swale, City of Canterbury, Thanet District, and Dover District) | | | Kent | |
| Broadstairs Detachment | Royal Tank Regiment | 185 Westwood Road, Broadstairs | Thanet District | Kent | CT10 2NT |
| Canterbury Detachment | Princess of Wales's Royal Regiment | Leros Barracks, Sturry Road, Canterbury | City of Canterbury | Kent | CT1 1HR |
| Deal Detachment | Royal Tank Regiment | Middle Deal Road, Deal | Dover District | Kent | CT14 9SN |
| Faversham Detachment | Princess of Wales's Royal Regiment | Stone Street, Faversham | Borough of Swale | Kent | ME13 8PH |
| Herne Bay Detachment | Princess of Wales's Royal Regiment | William Street, Herne Bay | City of Canterbury | Kent | CT6 5NY |
| Margate Detachment | Royal Tank Regiment | Victoria Road Drill Hall, Margate | Thanet District | Kent | CT9 1NA |
| Whitstable Detachment | Princess of Wales's Royal Regiment | Cromwell Road, Whitstable | City of Canterbury | Kent | CT5 1NN |
B Company
| B Company Headquarters | Encompassing South Kent (Borough of Ashford, Folkestone and Hythe District, and southern part of Dover District) | | | Kent | |
| Ashford (Alamein) Detachment | Royal Electrical and Mechanical Engineers | Chart Road, Ashford | Borough of Ashford | Kent | TN23 3HX |
| Ashford (Tobruk) Detachment | Royal Electrical and Mechanical Engineers | Chart Road, Ashford | Borough of Ashford | Kent | TN23 3HX |
| Dover Detachment | Royal Tank Regiment | London Road, Dover | Dover District | Kent | CT17 0SZ |
| Folkestone Detachment | Princess of Wales's Royal Regiment | Ship Street, Folkestone | Folkestone and Hythe District | Kent | CT19 5BE |
| Shorncliffe Detachment | Princess of Wales's Royal Regiment | Church Road, Shorncliffe Army Camp | Folkestone and Hythe District | Kent | CT20 3EL |
| Saint Mary's Bay Detachment | Princess of Wales's Royal Regiment | Jefferstone Road, Saint Mary's Bay, Romney Marsh | Folkestone and Hythe District | Kent | TN29 0SG |
| Tenterden Detachment | Princess of Wales's Royal Regiment | Appledore Road, Tenterden | Borough of Ashford | Kent | TN30 7BD |
D Company
| D Company Headquarters | Encompassing West Kent (Sevenoaks District, Tonbridge and Malling, Borough of Maidstone, and Borough of Tunbridge Wells) | | | Kent | |
| Boxley Detachment | Kent and County of London Yeomanry (Sharpshooters) – Royal Yeomanry | Yeomanry House, Boxley Road, Maidstone | Borough of Maidstone | Kent | TN17 3ES |
| Cranbrook Detachment | Princess of Wales's Royal Regiment | Causton Road, Cranbrook | Tunbridge Wells | Kent | ME14 2AR |
| Ditton Detachment | Princess of Wales's Royal Regiment | London Road, Ditton | Tonbridge and Malling | Kent | ME20 6DB |
| Mascalls Detachment | Princess of Wales's Royal Regiment | Mascalls School, Paddock Wood | Tunbridge Wells | Kent | TN12 6NB |
| Moncktons Detachment | Princess of Wales's Royal Regiment | College Avenue, Maidstone | Borough of Maidstone | Kent | ME15 6YJ |
| Sevenoaks Detachment | Princess of Wales's Royal Regiment | Argyle Road, Sevenoaks | Sevenoaks District | Kent | TN13 1HJ |
| Snodland Detachment | Princess of Wales's Royal Regiment | Lee Road, Snodland | Tonbridge and Malling | Kent | ME6 5NN |
| Tonbridge Detachment | Princess of Wales's Royal Regiment | Hectorage Road, Tonbridge | Tonbridge and Malling | Kent | TN9 2DR |
| Royal Tunbridge Wells Detachment | Princess of Wales's Royal Regiment | Saint John's Road, Royal Tunbridge Wells | Borough of Tunbridge Wells | Kent | TN4 9UU |
| Wrotham Detachment | Princess of Wales's Royal Regiment | Wrotham | Tonbridge and Malling | Kent | TN15 7RA |
Royal Engineers Squadron
| Royal Engineers Squadron Headquarters | Encompassing North Kent and Medway (Borough of Dartford, Gravesham, Medway, and Borough of Swale) | | | | |
| Dartford Detachment | Corps of Royal Engineers | Mead Crescent, Dartford | Borough of Dartford | Kent | DA1 2SH |
| Gillingham Detachment | Corps of Royal Engineers | Watling Street, Gillingham | Medway | Kent | ME7 2AA |
| Gravesend Detachment | Corps of Royal Engineers | Grande Road, Gravesend | Borough of Gravesham | Kent | DA11 0EU |
| Rochester Detachment | Corps of Royal Engineers | Fort Clarence, Rochester | Medway | Kent | ME1 3BG |
| Sheerness Detachment | Corps of Royal Engineers | The Bungalow, New Road, Sheerness | Medway | Kent | ME12 1BW |
| Strood Detachment | Corps of Royal Engineers | Tamar Drive, Strood | Medway | Kent | ME2 2EA |
| Swanley Detachment | Royal Regiment of Artillery | Swanley Lane, Swanley | Sevenoaks District | Kent | BR8 7LH |
| Walderslade Detachment | Corps of Royal Engineers | Walderslade School, Bradfield Avenue, Walderslade | Medway | Kent | ME5 0LE |
| Woodlands Detachment | Corps of Royal Engineers | Watling Street, Gillingham | Medway | Kent | ME7 2AA |
| Sittingbourne Detachment | Royal Regiment of Artillery | Crown Quay Lane, Sittingbourne | Borough of Swale | Kent | ME10 3SL |

== Honorary Colonels ==
- Sir Hugh Robertson, KCMG 1 June 2026–Present

== ACF Mission ==
The Army Cadet Force is a national, voluntary, uniformed youth organisation. It is sponsored by the British Army but not part of it and neither the cadets nor the adult volunteer leaders are subject to military call-up. They offer a broad range of challenging adventurous and educational activities, some of them on a military theme. Their aim is to inspire young people to achieve success in life and develop in them the qualities of a good citizen.

The ACF can be compared to their counterparts in the Junior Reserve Officers' Training Corps (USA), Hong Kong Adventure Corps, and Canadian Army Cadets, amongst others.

== See also ==
- List of Army Cadet Force units
- Combined Cadet Force
