= Headquarters West Midlands (United Kingdom) =

Regional command based in the West Midlands of England

- Active: 2014—2024
- Country: United Kingdom
- Branch: British Army
- Type: Regional Point of Command
- Part of: Regional Command
- Garrison/HQ: Donnington

Headquarters West Midlands was a regional point of command based in West Midlands of England. The command administered the reserve units based in its area and also provided the military support HQ for the police and civilian population in the area.

== History ==
Under the Army 2020 reorganisation, 11th Signal Brigade amalgamated with 143 (West Midlands) Brigade. The latter became "Headquarters West Midlands" with responsibility for units in the following counties: Shropshire, Herefordshire, Worcestershire, Warwickshire, Staffordshire, and West Midlands County. A formation parade took place at Donnington on 15 November 2014. Under the Army 2020 Refine reorganisation, 11th Signal and West Midlands Brigade remained responsible for reserve units in the West Midlands of England.

In 2024, under the Future Soldier reforms, the unit merged with Headquarters East to form Headquarters Centre at Kendrew Barracks.

== Structure ==
- Headquarters West Midlands, at Venning Barracks, Donnington
  - Birmingham University Officers' Training Corps (Army Reserve), at Montgomery House, Birmingham
  - 11th Signal Brigade & Headquarters West Midlands Cadet Training Team, in Dawley Bank, Telford
  - Derbyshire Army Cadet Force, in Derby
  - Herefordshire and Worcestershire Army Cadet Force, at Suvla Barracks, Hereford
  - Shropshire Army Cadet Force, at Copthorne Barracks, Shrewsbury
  - Staffordshire and West Midlands (North Sector) Army Cadet Force, at Beacon Barracks, Stafford
  - Warwickshire and West Midlands (South Sector) Army Cadet Force, in Harborne
