= 2nd Infantry Brigade (United Kingdom) =

British Army reserve formation

2nd Brigade 2nd Infantry Brigade 2 (South East) Brigade
- Insignia of 2nd (South East) Brigade.
- Active: 1908–2014
- Country: United Kingdom
- Branch: British Army
- Type: Infantry; Regional
- Size: Brigade
- Part of: Support Command
- Garrison/HQ: Shorncliffe Army Camp
- Engagements: First World War * Battle of Mons * First Battle of the Marne * First Battle of the Aisne * First Battle of Ypres * Battle of Aubers Ridge * Battle of Loos * Battle of the Somme * Battle of Pozières * Battle of Passchendaele * Battle of Épehy; Second World War * Battle of France * Tunisia Campaign * Italian Campaign

Commanders
- Notable commanders: Sir Edward Bulfin; Sir John Dill; Charles Hudson; Sir Arthur Dowler; Sir Richard Anderson

The 2nd Infantry Brigade (later 2 (South East) Brigade) was a regional brigade of the British Army, active since before the First World War. It was the regional formation of the Army in the South East of England–the Brigade commanded and administered soldiers throughout Kent, Surrey and Sussex–but also Brunei. In December 2014 the Brigade merged with 145 (South) Brigade to form Headquarters 11th Infantry Brigade and Headquarters South East.

== Early history ==
Following the end of the Second Boer War in 1902 the army was restructured, and the 2nd Infantry Brigade was established as part of the 1st Division in the 1st Army Corps, stationed at Aldershot Garrison.

== First World War ==
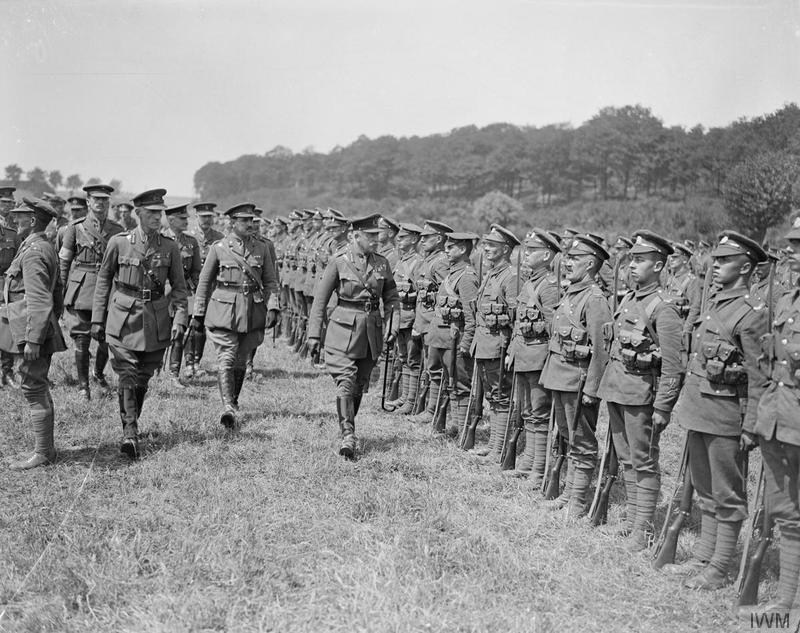
Prince Arthur, the Duke of Connaught, inspecting troops of the 1st Battalion, Northamptonshire Regiment, 2nd Brigade. Near Bruay, 1 July 1918.

The brigade, initially commanded by Brigadier-General Edward Bulfin, served with the 1st Division during the First World War, from 1914 to 1918 and served throughout the war on the Western Front as part of the British Expeditionary Force (BEF). The brigade fought in many of the major battles of the war, first fighting at Mons where they were forced to retreat, and later the First Battle of Ypres, the Second Battle of Ypres and later the Battle of the Somme and Battle of Passchendaele, the German spring offensive and the Hundred Days Offensive.

=== Order of Battle ===
The 2nd Brigade was constituted as follows during the war:

- 2nd Battalion, Royal Sussex Regiment
- 1st Battalion, Loyal Regiment (North Lancashire) (left February 1918)
- 1st Battalion, Northamptonshire Regiment
- 2nd Battalion, King's Royal Rifle Corps
- 1/5th (Cinque Ports) Battalion, Royal Sussex Regiment (from February to August 1915)
- 1/9th Battalion, King's (Liverpool Regiment) (from March to November 1915)
- 1/5th Battalion, King's Own Royal Regiment (Lancaster) (from October 1915 until January 1916)
- 2nd Machine Gun Company, Machine Gun Corps (formed 26 January 1916, moved to 1st Battalion, Machine Gun Corps 28 February 1918)
- 2nd Trench Mortar Battery (formed 27 November 1915)

=== Commanders ===
The following officers commanded 2nd Brigade during the First World War:

- Brigadier-General E. S. Bulfin (At mobilization)
- Colonel C. Cunliffe-Owen (10 November 1914 - acting)
- Brigadier-General C. B. Westmacott (23 November 1914)
- Brigadier-General G. H. Thesiger (5 May 1915)
- Brigadier-General J. H. W. Pollard (22 August 1915)
- Brigadier-General H. F. Thuillier (5 October 1915)
- Brigadier-General A. B. Hubback (10 March 1916)
- Brigadier-General G. C. Kemp (6 July 1917)
- Lieutenant-Colonel R. Bellamy (2 March 1918 - acting)
- Brigadier-General Sir W. A. I. Kay, Bt. (5 March 1918)
- Lieutenant-Colonel R. Bellamy (17 March 1918 - acting)
- Lieutenant-Colonel G. St. G. Robinson (21 March 1918 - acting)
- Brigadier-General G. C. Kelly (23 March 1918)
- Lieutenant-Colonel D. S. Johnson (26 September 1918 - acting)
- Brigadier-General G. C. Kelly (21 November 1918)

== Second World War ==
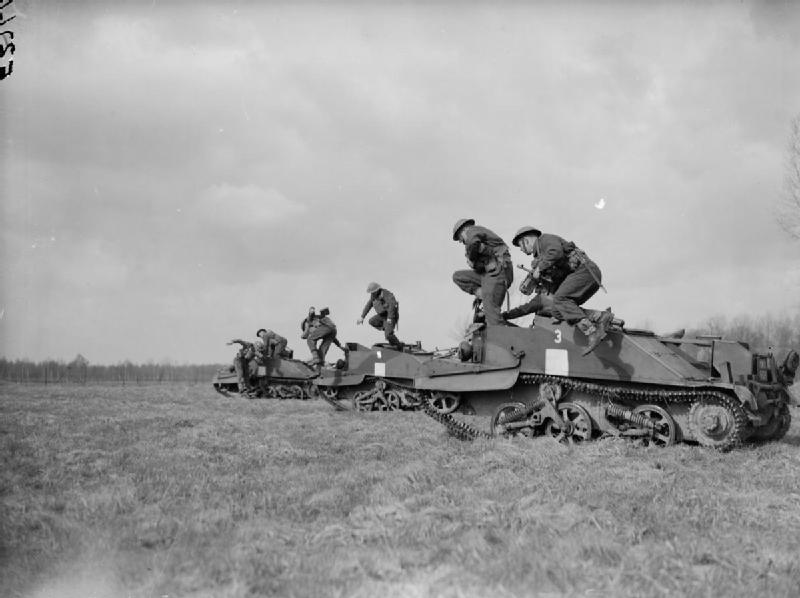
Troops from the 1st Battalion, Loyal Regiment (North Lancashire) leap from their Bren gun carriers while training at Bourghelles, 21 March 1940.

During the Second World War the 2nd Infantry Brigade saw active service in many of the major campaigns that the British Army fought in, from France with the BEF to Tunisia in North Africa and finally Italy and saw some extremely hard fighting at the Battle of Anzio where, during a German counterattack, the brigade was surrounded and nearly destroyed. In April 1943, during the fighting in Tunisia, Lieutenant Willward Alexander Sandys-Clarke of the 1st Battalion, Loyal Regiment (North Lancashire) was posthumously awarded the brigades' only Victoria Cross (VC) of the war.

=== Order of battle ===
The 2nd Infantry Brigade was constituted as follows during the war:

- 1st Battalion, Loyal Regiment (North Lancashire)
- 2nd Battalion, North Staffordshire Regiment
- 1st Battalion, Gordon Highlanders (left 7 March 1940)
- 2nd Infantry Brigade Anti-Tank Company (formed 3 September 1939, disbanded 28 December 1940)
- 6th Battalion, Gordon Highlanders (from 7 March 1940)

=== Commanders ===
The following officers commanded 2nd Infantry Brigade during the war:

- Brig. Charles Hudson; 1938 - 1940
- Brig. Arthur Dowler; 1940 - 1941
- Brig. Eric Edward James Moore; 1941 - 1944
- Brig. Adrian Clements Gore; 1944
- Brig. Charles Edward Anson Firth; 1944
- Brig. Richard Neville Anderson; 1944 - 1945

== Post-Second World War ==
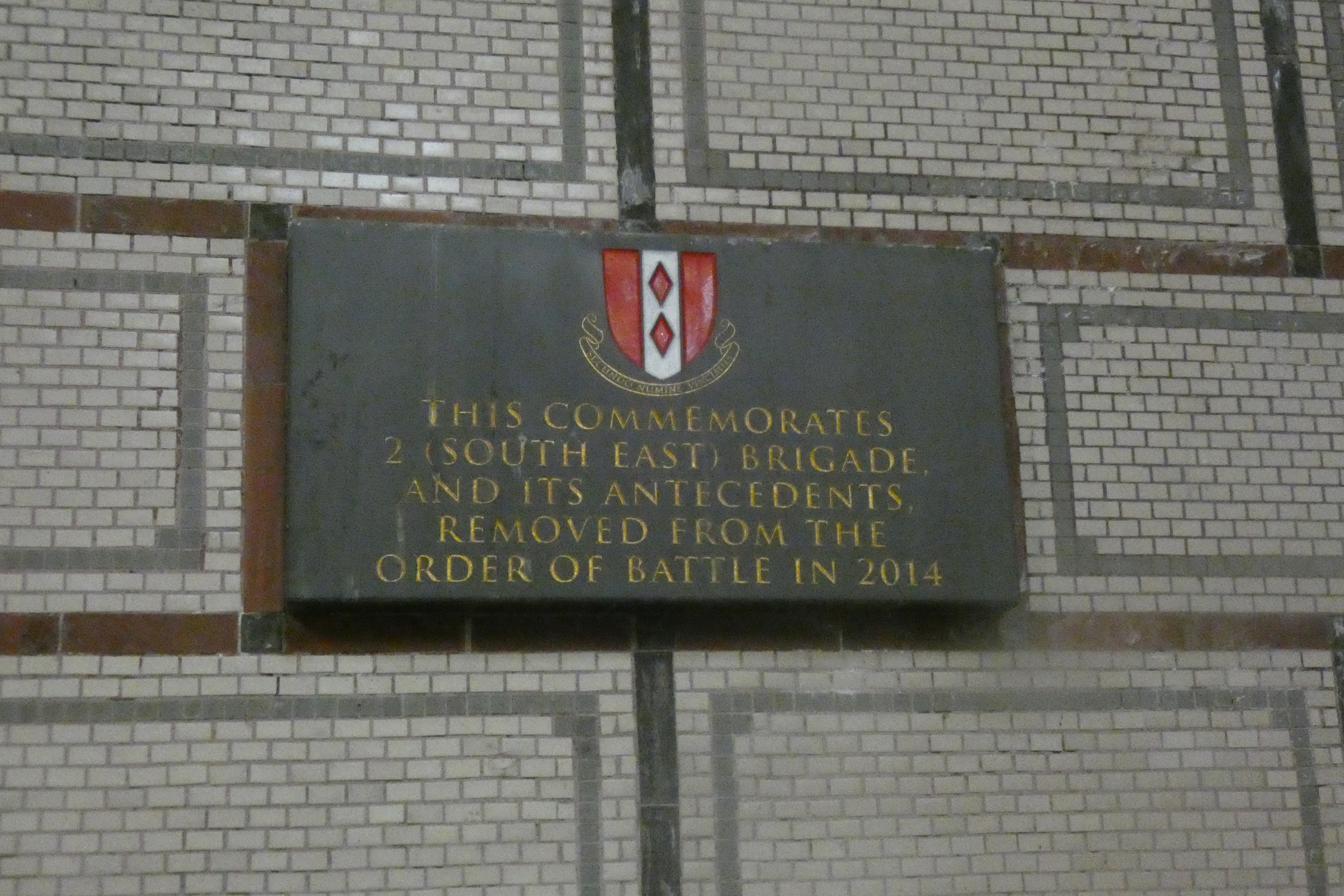
Commemorative plaque to 2 (SE) Brigade placed in the garrison church of St Mary sub Castro in Dover Castle after it was disbanded in 2014.

By 1952 the 1st Infantry Division in Middle East Land Forces in Egypt was made up of the 1st, 2nd, and 3rd Infantry Brigades, each with three battalions, plus divisional troops.

On the division's return home to the UK in November-December 1955, it took with it 2nd and 3rd Brigades.

The brigade was disestablished in April 1976, last commander being Brig B.N.L. Fletcher, and was reformed in October 1981.

By 1984 it was in South-Eastern District.

In the House of Commons on 8 January 2002 the Secretary of State for Defence said that "The two light infantry brigade headquarters (52 Lowland) Brigade and 2 (South East) Brigade) are being re-roled from regional brigade headquarters to provide better command and control arrangements for the light infantry role battalions, all of which are currently deployable. Thus the reorganisation of the two brigades will not result in an increase in the number of deployable troops. The change will bring greater coherence to the way that these units prepare for operations, through improved co-ordination of training".

Following broad reorganisation under the Future Army Structures, 2nd Infantry Brigade was renamed 2nd (South East) Brigade in 2007. The name was in line with its revised role as a Regional Brigade, responsible largely for Territorial Army units. The brigade became part of the United Kingdom's Support Command as the 2nd (South East) Brigade. It was not listed under the Army 2020 plan. In December 2014 the Brigade merged with 145 (South) Brigade to form Headquarters 11th Infantry Brigade and Headquarters South East.
