= James Senior =

Major General James Senior CBE
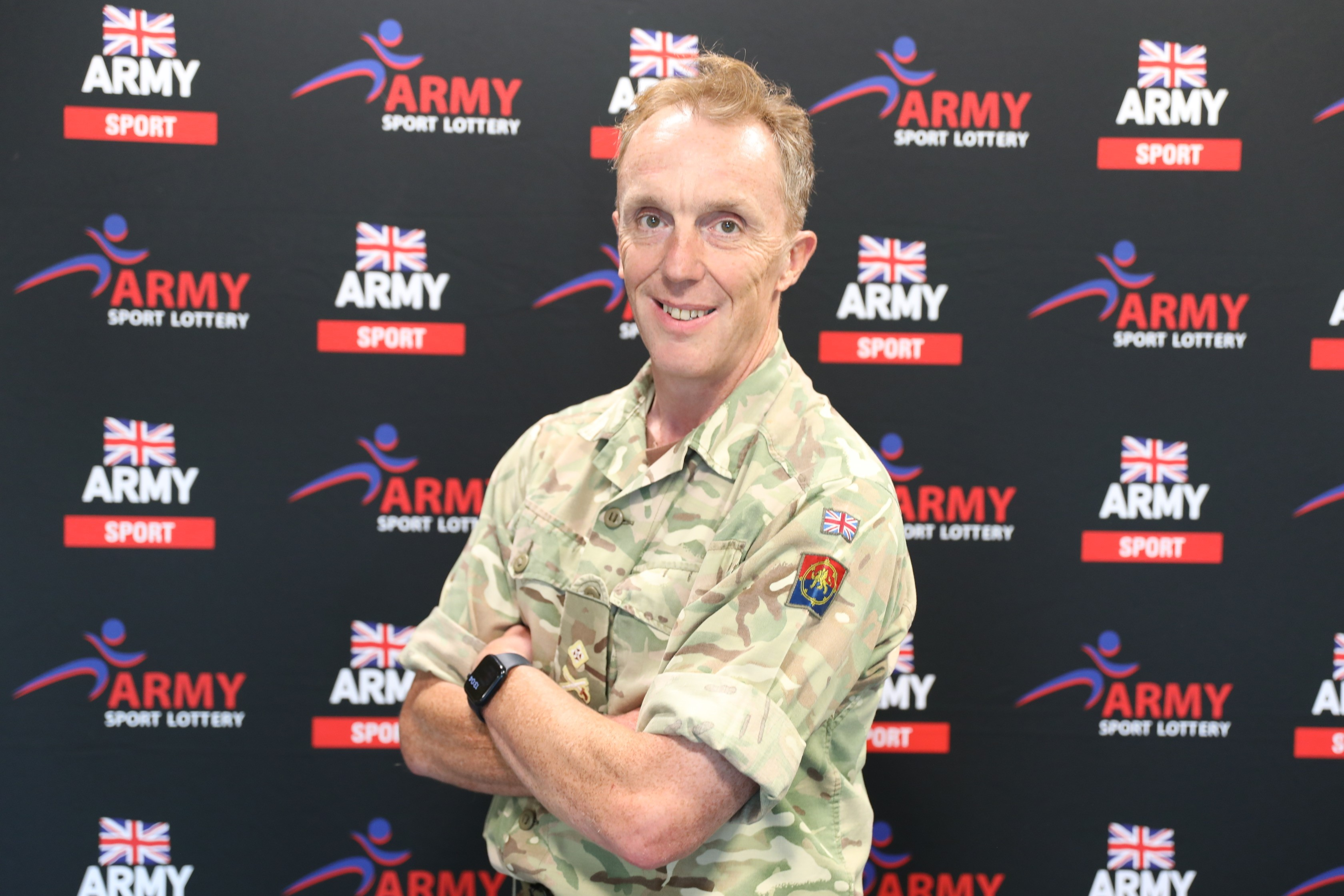
- Military career
- Allegiance: United Kingdom
- Branch: British Army
- Service years: 1993–present
- Rank: Major General
- Commands: 38th (Irish) Brigade; Regional Command
- Conflicts: War in Afghanistan
- Awards: Commander of the Order of the British Empire

Major General James Matthew Senior CBE is a senior British Army officer who served as General Officer Commanding Regional Command from September 2023 to July 2026.

== Military career ==
Having attended the Royal Military Academy Sandhurst, Senior was commissioned in the Educational and Training Services Branch on 14 December 1996 as a subaltern (second lieutenant) with seniority in that rank from 11 December 1993 and immediately promoted to subaltern (lieutenant) with seniority from 11 December 1995. On 15 January 1999, he transferred to the King's Royal Hussars. He was promoted to captain on 17 June 1999.

He went on to be commanding officer of the Light Dragoons. After that, he became commander of 38th (Irish) Brigade in August 2021, and General Officer Commanding Regional Command from September 2023 to July 2026. He is Commander Army Cadet Force.

He was appointed a Commander of the Order of the British Empire in the 2021 Birthday Honours.

Military offices
Preceded by Jonathan Swift	GOC Regional Command; 2023–2026	Succeeded by Justin Stenhouse
