= Jonathan Swift (British Army officer) =

British army officer

Major General Jonathan Swift OBE
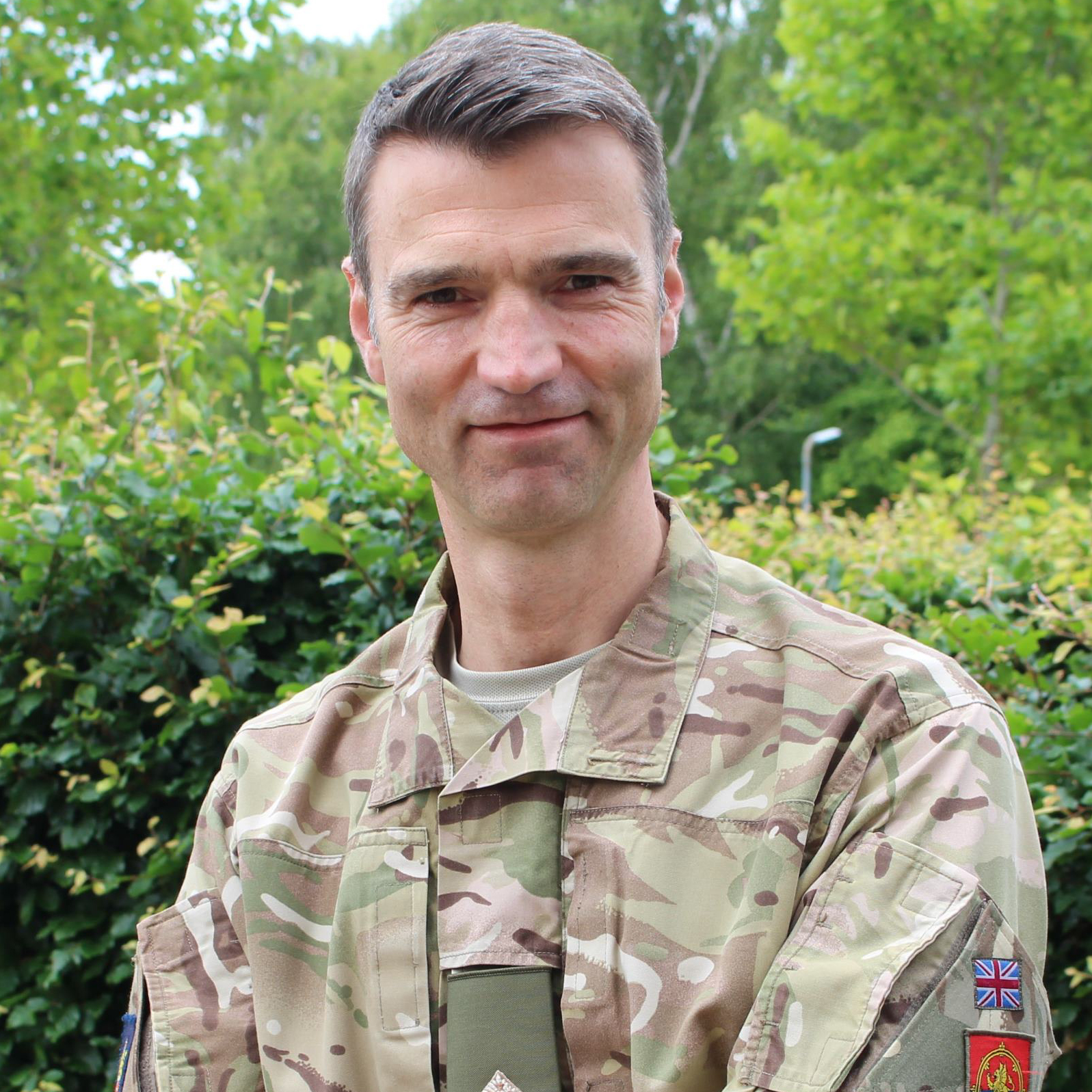
- Swift, c. before 2023
- Military career
- Allegiance: United Kingdom
- Branch: British Army
- Service years: 1995–present
- Rank: Major General
- Commands: 1st Battalion, Royal Regiment of Fusiliers; 38 (Irish) Brigade; Regional Command; Assistant Chief of the General Staff
- Conflicts: War in Afghanistan
- Awards: Officer of the Order of the British Empire

Major General Jonathan Swift, OBE is a senior British Army officer. He served as General Officer Commanding, Regional Command from July 2022 to August 2023; and currently serves as the Assistant Chief of the General Staff.

== Military career ==
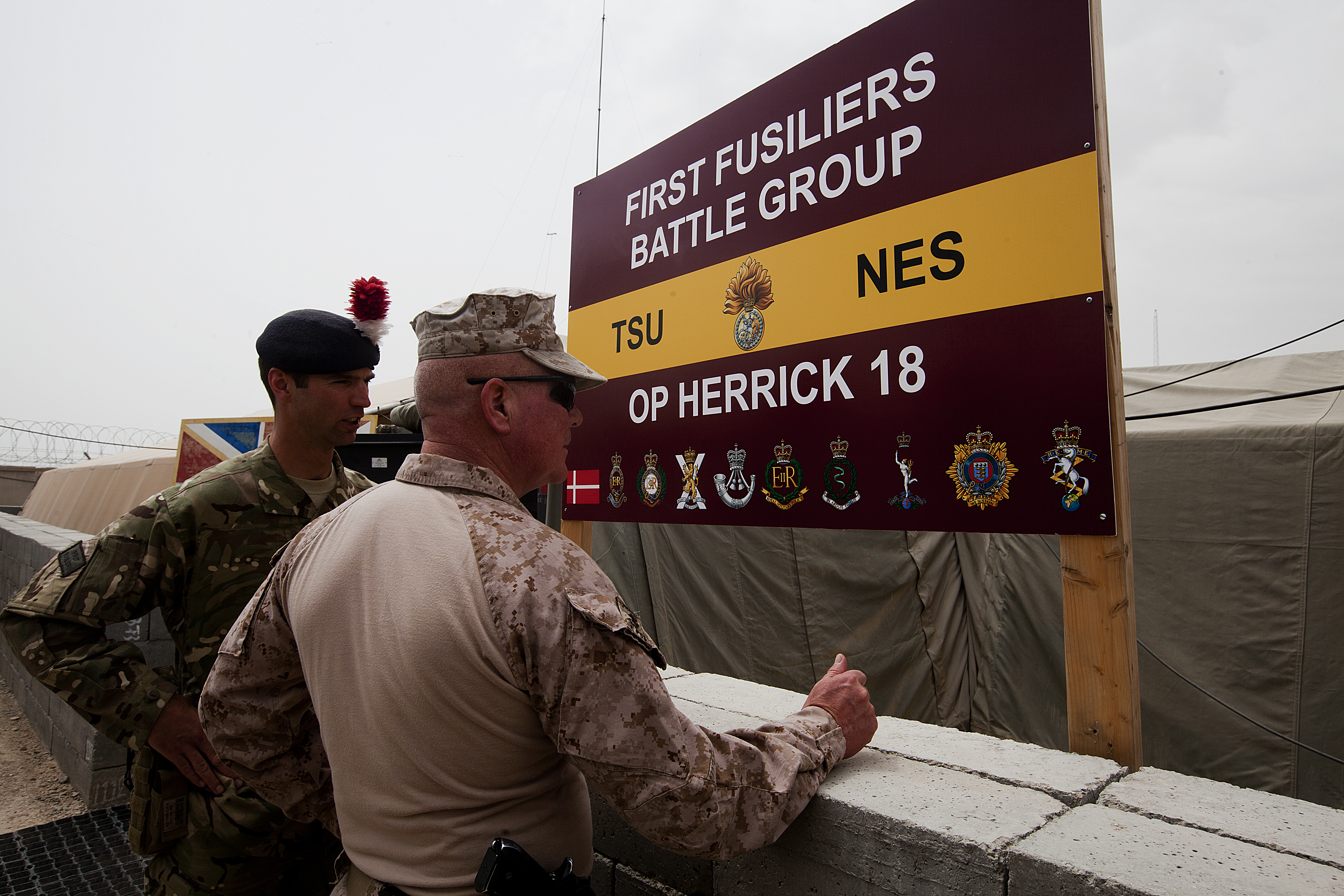
Swift in Afghanistan in 2013

Swift was commissioned into the Royal Regiment of Fusiliers in 1995. He became commanding officer of the 1st Battalion, Royal Regiment of Fusiliers in 2011, in which capacity he was deployed to Afghanistan on Operation Herrick 18 as commander of Transition Support Unit Nahr-e-Saraj. He went on to become senior requirements manager for armoured vehicles in Defence Equipment and Support in 2014, Assistant Head for Capability Plans in Army Headquarters in 2015 and commander, 38 (Irish) Brigade in September 2017.

After that, he became Head of Ground Manoeuvre Capability at Army Headquarters in October 2019. He was made colonel of The Royal Regiment of Fusiliers on 1 September 2020, an honorary post. On 6 July 2022, he was appointed General Officer Commanding, Regional Command, which is the Army head quarter for the UK, Nepal and Brunei, and promoted to major general. During his visit to BFB Tuker Lines in May 2023, he planted plants, spoke to spouses, and officially launched the BFB Community Library.

Swift became Director of Programmes at Army Headquarters in August 2023 and Assistant Chief of the General Staff in September 2025.

Swift was Honorary Colonel of the Manchester and Salford Universities Officers' Training Corps until November 2023, when his tenure expired.

== Awards and honours ==
Swift was appointed an Officer of the Order of the British Empire for services in Afghanistan in March 2014.

Military offices
Preceded by David Eastman	GOC Regional Command; 2022–2023	Succeeded by James Senior
Preceded by Paul Griffiths	Assistant Chief of the General Staff; 2025–present	Incumbent
