= Colin Boag =

British Army officer

Major General Colin Boag CB CBE
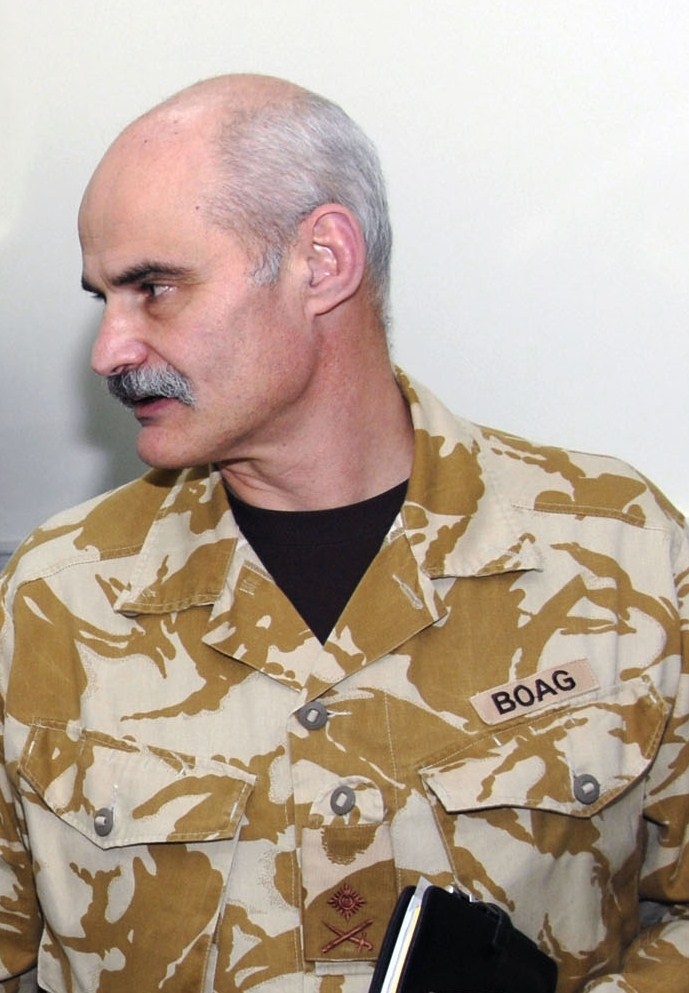
- Boag in uniform, 2011
- Military career
- Allegiance: United Kingdom
- Branch: British Army
- Service years: 1981–present
- Rank: Major General
- Unit: Royal Engineers
- Conflicts: War in Afghanistan
- Awards: Companion of the Order of the Bath; Commander of the Order of the British Empire (CBE); Officer of the Legion of Merit (United States)

Major General Colin James Boag CB CBE is a senior British Army officer.

== Military career ==
Boag graduated from the Royal Military Academy Sandhurst and was commissioned at the rank of second lieutenant in the Corps of Royal Engineers on 6 August 1983, with seniority from 3 May 1981, and immediately promoted to lieutenant, with seniority from 3 May 1983. He was promoted to captain on 3 November 1987 and attained field officer status with promotion to major on 30 September 1991.

Having served in the Balkans in 1995, Boag was awarded the Queen's Commendation for Valuable Service, in recognition of "gallant and distinguished services in the former Republic of Yugoslavia" in 1996. Boag was promoted to lieutenant colonel in June 1997, colonel in June 2001 and to brigadier, the British Army's highest field officer rank, on 31 December 2003. Boag was appointed Commander of the Order of the British Empire (CBE) in the 2006 Queen's Birthday Honours.

Boag attained general officer status with promotion to the substantive rank of major general on 25 January 2008, whereupon he assumed the appointment of Headquarters Land Command/Headquarters Adjutant General's Command Collocation Programme Team Leader. He was awarded the American Legion of Merit (Degree of Officer), "in recognition of gallant and distinguished services during coalition operations in Iraq", in March 2008 and granted unrestricted permission to wear the decoration on his uniform.

In 2010, Boag served as Chief of Staff to the International Security Assistance Force (ISAF) Joint Command, in which capacity he gave a lecture to personnel at Headquarters Allied Rapid Reaction Corps, who were preparing for deployment to Afghanistan. He became General Officer Commanding Support Command at Aldershot in 2011.

Boag was appointed Companion of the Order of the Bath (CB) in the 2013 Birthday Honours.

Military offices
Preceded by New Post	GOC Support Command; 2011–2013	Succeeded by Robert Nitsch
