= Government House, Aldershot =

Coordinates: 51.2724°N 0.7593°W

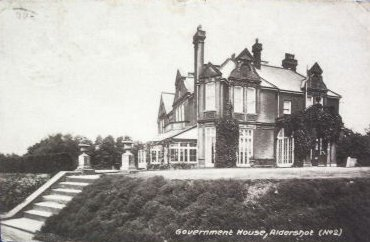
Government House circa 1890

Government House is a building in Aldershot Garrison near Aldershot, Hampshire, England.

== History ==
The house was built in Queen Anne revival style as the garrison commander's house in 1883. A military horse cemetery was created in the grounds of the house in the late 1880s. Most of the house was destroyed in a serious fire in January 1903, but there were no casualties and soldiers from nearby barracks managed to salvage much of the furniture and valuables. The new house was remodelled internally and it became the garrison officers' mess. In May 1904, shortly after the house re-opened, Lieutenant General Sir John French, Commanding the Troops at Aldershot, hosted a visit by the Prince and Princess of Wales there and in July 1914 Lieutenant General Sir Douglas Haig, Commander-in-Chief Aldershot Command, was waiting anxiously inside the house when he heard that the First World War had broken out.

In the 1920s and 1930s searchlight military tattoos were held in the grounds of Government House. The house was designated as Grade II listed in 2002. The building was again extensively refurbished in 2012 by Rydon and the Queen's Dining Room continues to be used to entertain important visitors to the garrison. The stables at the house will be converted for use as accommodation as part of the Army 2020 plan.

== Sources ==
- Rowlands, Murray (2015). Aldershot in the Great War: The Home of the British Army. Pen & Sword Military. ISBN 978-1783832026.
