= Richard Stanford (British Army officer) =

British Army officer (born 1966)

Major General Richard Stanford CB MBE
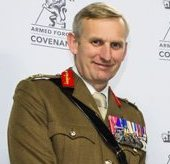
- Stanford in 2015
- Born: 1966 (age 59–60); Luton, Bedfordshire, England
- Military career
- Allegiance: United Kingdom
- Branch: British Army
- Service years: 1987–2021
- Rank: Major General
- Service number: 526327
- Unit: Welsh Guards
- Commands: Support Command; 1st Battalion, Welsh Guards
- Conflicts: The Troubles; Iraq War
- Awards: Companion of the Order of the Bath; Member of the Order of the British Empire

Major General Richard James Æthelstan Stanford, CB, MBE (born 1966) is a retired senior British Army officer who served as General Officer Commanding Support Command from 2015 to 2017.

== Early life and education ==
Stanford was born in 1966 in Luton, England. He joined the British Army after finishing school, and attended the Royal Military Academy Sandhurst for officer training. He later attended Cranfield University, graduating with a Master of Arts degree in 1999, and studied with the Open University, completing a Master of Business Administration degree in 2003.

== Career ==
=== Military career ===
Stanford was commissioned into the Welsh Guards in 1987, and saw active service during the Troubles in Northern Ireland, for which he was appointed a Member of the Order of the British Empire in October 1993. He went on to become commanding officer of the 1st Battalion the Welsh Guards, in which capacity he was deployed to Bosnia and Herzegovina on peace keeping duties in 2006. He was the Field Officer in Brigade Waiting and commanded the parade in Trooping the Colour 2007.

In 2009 Stanford was succeeded by Rupert Thorneloe just prior to the battalion's deployment to Afghanistan; Thorneloe was killed in action during Operation Panther's Claw. Stanford saw active service during the Iraq War, where he served as an advisor to the Head of the Iraqi Army in 2009. He became Chief of Joint Fires and Influence Branch at Headquarters Allied Rapid Reaction Corps in March 2012, and General Officer Commanding Support Command in June 2015. He became Senior British Loan Services Officer, Oman in October 2017.

He was appointed a Companion of the Order of the Bath in the 2021 New Year Honours.

=== Forestry Commission ===
Stanford became the Chief Executive of the Forestry Commission in August 2021.

== Personal life ==
Stanford has been married to his wife Fiona since 1995; they have a son and a daughter. Fiona wrote the book Don't Say Goodbye: Our Heroes and the Families They Leave Behind, which is a compilation of her experience as a military wife and stories of wives, girlfriends and children of other Welsh Guards deployed to Afghanistan. He held the ceremonial appointment of Regimental Lieutenant Colonel of the Welsh Guards from 7 June 2015 to 7 June 2020.

Military offices
Preceded by Robert Nitsch	GOC Regional Command; 2015–2017	Succeeded by Duncan Capps
