= Robert Nitsch =

Major General Robert Nitsch CBE
- Military career
- Allegiance: United Kingdom
- Branch: British Army
- Service years: 1983–present
- Rank: Major General
- Conflicts: War in Afghanistan
- Awards: Member of the Order of the British Empire

Major General Robert Malcolm Bowstead Nitsch CBE is a retired British Army officer who served as General Officer Commanding Support Command.

== Military career ==
Nitsch was commissioned into the Royal Electrical and Mechanical Engineers in 1983. He became Commander of 102nd Logistic Brigade and went on to be head of logistics for UK forces in Afghanistan.

In February 2011 he took part in the joint US-UK investigation into the unsuccessful operation to release Scottish aid worker Linda Norgrove. He became Director of Army Manning in April 2012 and General Officer Commanding Support Command in August 2013.

Already a Member of the Order of the British Empire (MBE), Nitsch was appointed Commander of the Order of the British Empire (CBE) in the 2014 New Year Honours. He was Honorary Colonel of Southampton UOTC from 2014 to 2024.

Military offices
Preceded by Colin Boag	GOC Support Command; 2013–2015	Succeeded by Richard Stanford
