= Thiepval Barracks =

- Lisburn
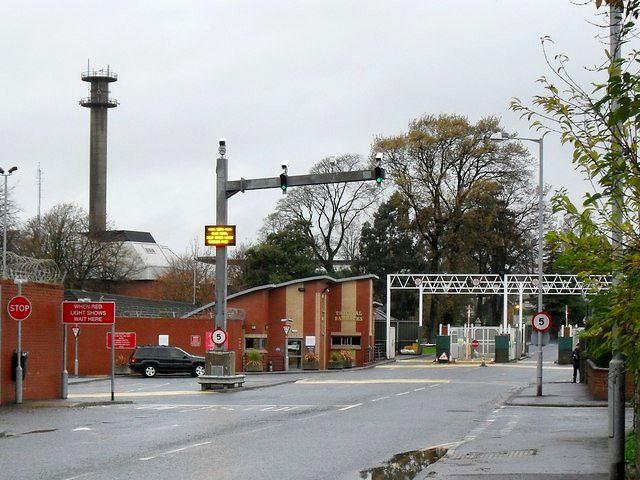
- Thiepval Barracks

Site information
- Type: Barracks
- Owner: Ministry of Defence
- Operator: British Army

Location
- Location within Northern Ireland
- Coordinates: 54°31′27″N 06°3′6″W

Site history
- Built: 1940
- Built for: War Office
- In use: 1940-Present

Garrison information
- Occupants: Headquarters, 38th (Irish) Brigade Headquarters, 2nd Battalion, Royal Irish Regiment 2nd Battalion, The Rifles

Thiepval Barracks is a British Army barracks and headquarters in Lisburn, County Antrim. It is also the site of the stone frigate HMS Hibernia, Headquarters of the Royal Naval Reserve in Northern Ireland.

== History ==
The barracks were built in 1940. They are named after the village of Thiepval in northern France, an important site in the Battle of the Somme and site of the Thiepval Memorial to the Missing of the Somme.

From 1954, the barracks contained the operational headquarters of No 31 Belfast Group Royal Observer Corps (ROC) who operated from a protected nuclear bunker on Knox Road within Thiepval Barracks. Converted from a 1940s anti-aircraft operations room (AAOR), the bunker would support over one hundred ROC volunteers and a ten-man United Kingdom Warning and Monitoring Organisation warning team, responsible for the famous four-minute warning in the event of a nuclear strike on the UK. The ROC would also detect radioactive fallout from the nuclear bursts and warn the public of approaching fallout. The two organisations were stood down at the end of the Cold War.

In early 1970, the barracks also became home to 39 Infantry Brigade and provided the headquarters for the Ulster Defence Regiment. The brigade, as 39 Airportable Brigade, was involved in The Troubles in Northern Ireland, eventually taking on responsibility under HQ Northern Ireland for an area including Belfast and the eastern side of the province, but excluding the South Armagh border region. For most of the conflict, signals support for the brigade was provided by 213 Signal Squadron. From September 1970, the brigade was commanded by (then) Brigadier Frank Kitson.

On 7 October 1996 the Provisional Irish Republican Army penetrated the heavily fortified base to detonate two car bombs. The first detonated at 15:35 GMT followed by the second around ten minutes later close to the base's medical facilities where victims were gathering. Warrant Officer James Bradwell (43) was killed and 21 soldiers and 10 civilians were injured. This bombing was the first major attack on a military base in Northern Ireland since the ending of the IRA's ceasefire with the 1996 Docklands bombing.

The 39 Infantry Brigade took on some units from 3 Brigade when that brigade was disbanded on 1 September 2004. The HQ 8 Infantry Brigade, based in Shackleton Barracks, Ballykelly, County Londonderry, was disbanded and handed over responsibility to HQ 39 Infantry Brigade at Thiepval Barracks on 1 September 2006.

On 1 August 2007, the brigade was amalgamated with 107 (Ulster) Brigade when the new non-deployable brigade HQ, the 38 (Irish) Brigade, was formed in the province.

HMS Hibernia
- Active: September 2010–present
- Country: United Kingdom
- Branch: Royal Navy
- Type: Stone frigate
- Role: Regional headquarters & reserve unit
- Part of: Royal Naval Reserve

=== HMS Hibernia ===
HMS Hibernia is the name given to a stone frigate of the Royal Navy, which serves as the headquarters of the Royal Naval Reserve in Northern Ireland and is Northern Ireland's only Royal Navy stone frigate. It was commissioned in 2009 to replace the C-class cruiser HMS Caroline as the training establishment for the RNR in Northern Ireland, Hibernia is located within Thiepval Barracks. The unit numbers approximately 100 officers and ratings and is also home to University Royal Naval Unit (URNU) Belfast.

== Current units ==
The barracks remain home to:

=== British Army ===
- Headquarters, 38th (Irish) Brigade
- 2nd Battalion, The Rifles
- Battalion Headquarters & HQ Company, 2nd Battalion Royal Irish Regiment
- 157 Coy (Det), 102 Battalion, REME
- 54 MI Coy, 5 Military Intelligence Battalion, Int Corps
- 32 AEC Gp, Educational and Training Services Branch

=== Royal Navy ===
- HMS Hibernia
  - URNU Belfast

== Bibliography ==
- Potter, John (2001). A testimony to courage : the regimental history of the Ulster Defence Regiment. London: Leo Cooper. ISBN 978-0-85052-819-0. OCLC 854583867.
