= Thiepval barracks bombing =

1996 IRA attack in Lisburn, Northern Ireland

- Part of the Troubles
- Location: 54°31′31.15″N 6°02′52.96″W; Lisburn, County Antrim, Northern Ireland
- Date: 7 October 1996; 15:35 (UTC)
- Target: British Army headquarters in Northern Ireland
- Attack type: Bombing
- Weapon: 2 car bombs
- Deaths: 1 soldier
- Injuries: 21 soldiers, 10 civilians
- Perpetrator: Provisional IRA

The Thiepval Barracks bombing was a double car bomb attack carried out by the Provisional Irish Republican Army (IRA) on 7 October 1996. The bombs exploded inside Thiepval Barracks, the British Army headquarters in Northern Ireland. One British soldier was killed and 31 people were injured. This bombing was the first major attack on a military base in Northern Ireland since the end of the IRA's ceasefire eight months earlier.

== Background ==
The Provisional IRA ended its 1994 ceasefire on 9 February 1996, when a massive truck bomb went off in the London Docklands area, resulting in two deaths and causing huge damage, especially around the South Quay railway station. The IRA strategy was to pressure the British government by bombing England, but without rejecting the peace process and without returning to full-scale operations. At first, there were no prospects of resuming the campaign in Northern Ireland, to defuse potential all-out sectarian violence. However, a series of successful police raids in England led to a decision by the IRA to restart its operations in Northern Ireland.

== Barracks bombing ==
On 7 October 1996, two Provisional IRA volunteers gained access to the base using forged passes based on the identity card of a former British soldier who had joined the IRA. They drove two 800-pound (360 kg) car bombs several hundred yards into the Thiepval Barracks in Lisburn, which housed the British Army headquarters in Northern Ireland. The first car bomb detonated near a travel arrangement centre, injuring many people. When the wounded were moved to the military medical centre, the second car bomb detonated there, catching the victims of the first blast as well as the medical staff helping them. The medical centre was reduced to rubble. There was a lapse of 12 minutes between the first and the second blast. There were 31 injured, four of them seriously. A British soldier, Warrant Officer James Bradwell, died four days later of multiple wounds. He was the first soldier to be killed in Northern Ireland since 1994.

The attack coincided with the beginning of the Conservative Party conference in Bournemouth and a meeting between loyalist prisoners and members of the Progressive Unionist Party (PUP) in the Maze prison. The IRA claimed responsibility on 8 October, in a telephone call to RTÉ news in Dublin. The IRA statement said the target had been barracks personnel and said injuries to civilians were regretted. According to one source, the main security failure that allowed the IRA to penetrate the base was the external security checkpoints and cameras. At first, the RUC's main suspect was a man in his 40s "with a black beard, dark hair and blackrimmed glasses", although investigators thought it was a disguise. A north Belfast man was eventually charged for the bombing on 1 November 1996.

== Aftermath ==
Sinn Féin leader Gerry Adams was reluctant to confirm whether or not the IRA was involved, and vowed for talks with the British government and the unionist parties. He warned however that "There has been a protracted political vacuum here. If we don't fill that vacuum with real talks then it will be filled with the sort of serious incidents we saw yesterday".

John Bruton, then Taoiseach of the Republic of Ireland, called the bombing a "cynical betrayal of the peace process" by the IRA, while PUP leader David Ervine appealed to loyalists not to seek retaliation for the bombing. John Major, the British prime minister, made clear that "the IRA would not bomb its way into the Stormont talks".

The attack was seen as a confirmation that the IRA had given up any hope of achieving a political breakthrough until the next British general elections in 1997.

== See also ==
- Provisional IRA chronology 1992-1999
- Glenane barracks bombing
- Deal barracks bombing
