= Headquarters Centre (United Kingdom) =

Regional command based in the Midlands of England

- Active: 2024—Present
- Country: United Kingdom
- Branch: British Army
- Type: Regional Point of Command
- Part of: Regional Command
- Garrison/HQ: Kendrew Barracks

Headquarters Centre is a regional point of command based in Midlands of England. The command administers the reserve units based in its area and also provides the military support HQ for the police and civilian population in the area.

== History ==
In 2024, under the Future Soldier reforms, Headquarters East merged with Headquarters West Midlands to form Headquarters Centre at Kendrew Barracks.

== Structure ==
- Headquarters Centre, Kendrew Barracks, Cottesmore
  - Headquarters Centre (East) Cadet Training Team, at Chetwynd Barracks, Chilwell
  - Headquarters Centre (West) Cadet Training Team, in Dawley Bank, Telford
  - Colonel Cadets (East Midlands)
    - Derbyshire Army Cadet Force, in Derby
    - Leicestershire, Northamptonshire, and Rutland Army Cadet Force, in South Wigston
    - Lincolnshire Army Cadet Force, at Sobraon Barracks, Lincoln
    - Nottinghamshire Army Cadet Force, in Nottingham
  - Colonel Cadets (East Anglia)
    - Bedfordshire and Hertfordshire Army Cadet Force, in Hertford
    - Cambridgeshire Army Cadet Force, in Waterbeach
    - Essex Army Cadet Force, in Chelmsford
    - Norfolk Army Cadet Force, in Dereham
    - Suffolk Army Cadet Force, in Ipswich
  - Colonel Cadets (West Midlands)
    - Herefordshire and Worcestershire Army Cadet Force, at Suvla Barracks, Hereford
    - Shropshire Army Cadet Force, at Copthorne Barracks, Shrewsbury
    - Staffordshire and West Midlands (North Sector) Army Cadet Force, at Beacon Barracks, Stafford
    - Warwickshire and West Midlands (South Sector) Army Cadet Force, in Harborne
