= Justin Stenhouse =

British major-general

Major General Justin Stenhouse CBE DSO
- Military career
- Allegiance: United Kingdom
- Branch: British Army
- Service years: 1998–present
- Rank: Major General
- Commands: 1st The Queen's Dragoon Guards; 11th Security Force Assistance Brigade; Regional Command
- Conflicts: Kosovo War; Bosnian War; Iraq War; War in Afghanistan
- Awards: Commander of the Order of the British Empire; Distinguished Service Order

Major General Justin George Edward Stenhouse CBE DSO is a senior British Army officer who currently serves as General Officer Commanding Regional Command.

== Military career ==
Stenhouse was commissioned into the 1st The Queen's Dragoon Guards in 1998. He became commanding officer of his regiment in 2017, Assistant Head of Capability Plans in Army Headquarters in 2019 and commander of 11th Security Force Assistance Brigade in May 2022, with promotion to brigadier on 30 June 2022.

Stenhouse oversaw the training programme for the Armed Forces of Ukraine under Operation Interflex in 2022. After that he was appointed Head of Capability Plans – Force Development in the Ministry of Defence in June 2024 and General Officer Commanding Regional Command with promotion to major general in July 2026.

He was appointed a Member of the Order of the British Empire in the 2018 Birthday Honours and a Companion of the Distinguished Service Order for services in Afghanistan in September 2012. He was advanced to Commander of the Order of the British Empire in the 2024 Birthday Honours.

Military offices
Preceded by James Senior	GOC Regional Command; 2026–present	Incumbent
