= 145th Infantry Brigade (United Kingdom) =

South Midland Brigade 145th (South Midland) Brigade 145th Infantry Brigade 145th (South) Brigade
- Insignia of 145 (South) Brigade
- Active: 1908–1919; 1920–1943; 1995–2014
- Country: United Kingdom
- Branch: British Army
- Type: Territorial Army; Regular and Army Reserve
- Size: Brigade
- Part of: Support Command
- Garrison/HQ: Aldershot Garrison

Insignia
- Identification symbol: Roebuck

The 145th Infantry Brigade was a regional brigade of the British Army that saw active service in both the First and the Second World Wars, disbanding in 1943 and being reformed in the 1990s. The Brigade was renamed Headquarters 11th Infantry Brigade and Headquarters South East in October 2014.

== Formation ==
The South Midland Brigade was first formed on the creation of the Territorial Force in 1908 by the amalgamation of the Volunteer Force and the Yeomanry. The South Midland Brigade was composed of four Volunteer battalions: the 5th Battalion, Gloucestershire Regiment, the 4th Battalion, Oxfordshire and Buckinghamshire Light Infantry and the Buckinghamshire Battalion, Ox and Bucks and the 4th Battalion, (Princess Charlotte of Wales's) Royal Berkshire Regiment. The brigade was assigned to the South Midland Division, which was one of fourteen divisions of the peacetime Territorials.

== First World War ==
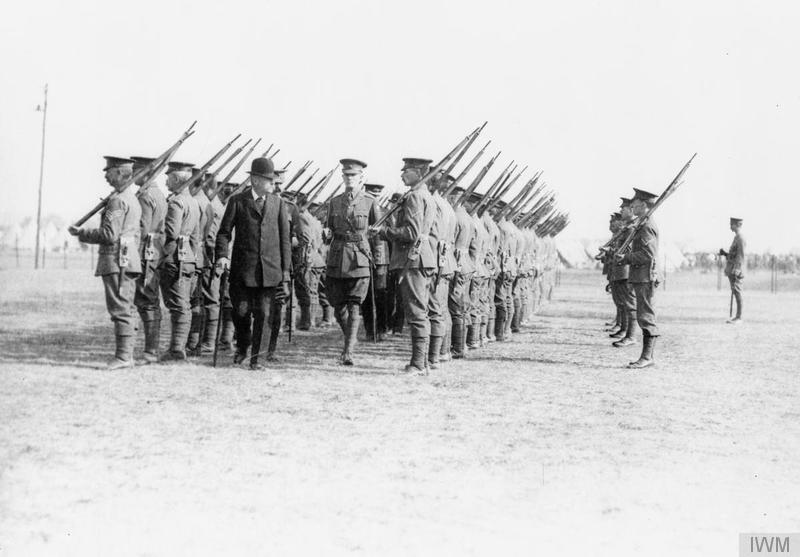
James Herbert Benyon, lord lieutenant of Berkshire, inspects men of the 4th Battalion, Royal Berkshire Regiment at Newbury Racecourse, October 1914.

The division was mobilised on 4 August 1914, the day after the outbreak of the First World War. Most of the men of the division volunteered for overseas service and the ones who didn't were formed into 2nd Line units, the 2nd South Midland Brigade, part of the 2nd South Midland Division.

The brigade was numbered as the 145th (South Midland) Brigade (along with the 143rd (Warwickshire) Brigade and 144th (Gloucester and Worcester) Brigade) in the 48th (South Midland) Division. The battalions, like all other TF battalions, were redesignated with the '1/' prefix (1/4th Ox and Bucks, for example) to distinguish them from the 2nd Line units, formed of those men who did not originally volunteer to serve overseas, who were designated with the '2/', and were later numbered 184th (2/1st South Midland) Brigade, 61st (2nd South Midland) Division.

The brigade was in continuous service in France on the Western Front in battles at Albert and in 1916 at Bazentin Ridge, Pozières Ridge, Ancre, all part of the Somme offensive.

The 145th Brigade, with 48th Division, later pursued the German Army in the retreat to the Hindenburg Line and again fought in the Battle of Langemarck and later at Polygon Wood, both part of the Passchendaele and later on the Italian Front until the Armistice in 1918 with Germany.

=== Order of battle ===
- 1/5th Battalion, Gloucestershire Regiment (left September 1918)
- 1/4th Battalion, Oxfordshire and Buckinghamshire Light Infantry
- 1/1st (Buckinghamshire) Battalion, Oxfordshire and Buckinghamshire Light Infantry
- 1/4th Battalion, Princess Charlotte of Wales's (Royal Berkshire Regiment)
- 145th Machine Gun Company, Machine Gun Corps (formed 11 January 1916, moved to 48th Battalion, Machine Gun Corps 22 March 1918)
- 145th Trench Mortar Battery (formed 14 June 1916)

== Between the wars ==
The brigade and division were disbanded in 1919, along with the rest of the Territorial Force, which later reformed in 1920 and was renamed as the Territorial Army. Both the 48th Division and the 145th Brigade was subsequently reconstituted, now as 145th (South Midland) Infantry Brigade, and comprised the same four battalions it had before the Great War, remaining this way for most of the inter-war period.

Sometime between the wars, the 5th Battalion, Gloucestershire Regiment was transferred to 144th (Gloucester and Worcester) Infantry Brigade, replacing the 6th Battalion which subsequently joined the 145th Brigade. In 1938, when British infantry brigades were reduced from four to three battalions, the 6th Battalion, Gloucestershire Regiment was transferred to the Royal Tank Regiment, converting into an armoured role as 44th Battalion, Royal Tank Regiment (44 RTR), later becoming part of 21st Army Tank Brigade. In 1939 the brigade was redesignated the 145th Infantry Brigade.

== Second World War ==
The Second World War began on 3 September 1939, although the division had been mobilised two days earlier, along with the rest of the Territorial Army due to the German invasion of Poland. Soon after mobilisation the division began training and preparing for overseas service.

In early January 1940 the 145th Brigade, commanded at the time by acting Brigadier Archibald Cecil Hughes, and the rest of 48th Division, was sent to France in early January 1940 to join the rest of the British Expeditionary Force (BEF) which was stationed on the Franco-Belgian border, alongside the French Army. The 145th Brigade landed in France on 18 January 1940 and was the last brigade of 48th Division to land. Soon after arrival of the division, it became part of BEF policy to integrate Regular Army units into Territorial Army formations and so the 4th Battalion, Royal Berkshire Regiment was exchanged for the 2nd Battalion, Gloucestershire Regiment, a Regular battalion, from the 8th Infantry Brigade of the 3rd Infantry Division.

The brigade, with the rest of the 48th Division, fought in the battles of Belgium and France, and at the battle of the Ypres-Comines Canal and had to retreat to Dunkirk be evacuated to England after the German Army threatened to cut off the entire BEF from the main French Armies. Following its withdrawal from France (where the 4th Ox and Bucks was surrounded and virtually destroyed as a fighting force near Watou) the brigade was reformed, as with most units that had fought in France, with large numbers of men who had been conscripted. With the rest of the division, the brigade was stationed in Cornwall on home defence, anticipating a possible German invasion which, fortunately, never arrived due to the attempt to gain air superiority which failed during the Battle of Britain.

In late December 1942 the division and brigade were reduced to a Lower Establishment and became a training formation in the United Kingdom. However, 7 November 1943, the 145th Brigade HQ was disbanded, and its component units were transferred elsewhere. Neither the brigade nor the 48th Division were reformed when the Territorial Army was reconstituted in 1947.

=== Order of battle ===
The 145th Infantry Brigade was constituted as follows during the war:

- 4th Battalion, Oxfordshire and Buckinghamshire Light Infantry (until 2 November 1943)
- 1st Buckinghamshire Battalion, Oxfordshire and Buckinghamshire Light Infantry (until 12 December 1942)
- 4th Battalion, Royal Berkshire Regiment (until 5 February 1940)
- 145th Infantry Brigade Anti-Tank Company (formed 4 October 1939, disbanded 11 January 1941)
- 2nd Battalion, Gloucestershire Regiment (from 5 February 1940 until 10 December 1942)
- 6th Battalion, King's Own Royal Regiment (Lancaster) (from 12 December 1942 until 6 November 1943)
- 5th Battalion, Royal Inniskilling Fusiliers (from 3 January until 6 November 1943)

=== Commanders ===
The following officers commanded 145th Infantry Brigade during the war:

- Brigadier A.C. Hughes (until 16 May 1940)
- Brigadier N.F. Somerset (from 16 May, captured 29 May 1940)
- Brigadier The O'Donovan (from 29 June until 13 August 1940)
- Brigadier Viscount Bridgeman (from 13 August to 27 November 1940)
- Brigadier G.C. Thorne (from 27 November 1940 until 3 May 1941)
- Lieutenant-Colonel P.P. King (Acting, from 3 to 7 May 1941)
- Brigadier J.W.N. Haugh (from 7 May 1941 until 11 February 1942)
- Lieutenant-Colonel P.P. King (Acting, from 11 to 14 February 1942)
- Brigadier W.A.M. Stawell (from 14 February until 19 November 1942)
- Brigadier C.W.G. Grimley (from 19 November 1942 until 7 October 1943)
- Lieutenant-Colonel F.L. Norris (Acting, from 7 October 1943)

== Post-war ==
In 1994, 145 Brigade was reformed through the renaming of Aldershot Area, part of the old South East District, assuming responsibility for all army units in the Isle of Wight, Hampshire, Berkshire, Oxfordshire, Buckinghamshire, Hertfordshire and Bedfordshire. In doing so it joined 4th Division.

It became 145 (South) Brigade in 2007 and had its headquarters in Aldershot, Hampshire, England. It administered the counties of Oxfordshire, Buckinghamshire, Berkshire, Hampshire and the Isle of Wight. It also directly commanded Regular Army and Territorial Army (TA) soldiers and Army cadets. These comprised one TA infantry battalion (7 Rifles), two University Officers' Training Corps (Oxford and Southampton Universities) and four Army County Cadet Forces. The Brigade moved into a new headquarters building, named Roebuck House, in November 2011. The building was officially opened in 2012. With the disbandment of 4th Division, the brigade came under the control of the new Support Command on 2 April 2012. Under Army 2020, the Brigade was renamed Headquarters 11th Infantry Brigade and Headquarters South East in October 2014.

== Bibliography ==
- Joslen, H. F. (2003) [1960]. Orders of Battle: Second World War, 1939–1945. Uckfield, East Sussex: Naval and Military Press. ISBN 978-1-84342-474-1.
- David Fraser (1999) [1983]. And We Shall Shock Them: The British Army in the Second World War. Cassell military. ISBN 978-0-304-35233-3.
