= Regional Command (British Army) =

Two-star command of the British Army

- Active: Regional Command 2015–present Support Command 2011–2015
- Country: United Kingdom
- Branch: British Army
- Type: Command
- Part of: Standing Joint Command
- Garrison/HQ: Aldershot Garrison

Commanders
- Current commander: Major-General Justin G. E. Stenhouse

Regional Command, formerly Support Command until 2015, is a two-star command of the British Army. It is the Army's HQ for the UK, Nepal and Brunei. It delivers Real Life Support to the Army and controls the UK Stations and Garrisons. It is also responsible for engagement with the civilian community and acts as the proponent for UK Operations.

== History ==
Support Command was formed on 1 November 2011 and absorbed the functions of the 4th Infantry Division on 1 January 2012 and of 2nd Infantry Division and 5th Infantry Division from 1 April 2012. Support Command was headquartered at Aldershot Garrison in South East England. Initial published tasks included:

- Lead on the Firm Base Concept for Commander Land Forces from 1 November 2011.
- Deliver Firm Base support as defined by Project AVANTI from 3 January 2012 within 2nd (South East) Brigade, 43rd (Wessex) Brigade and 145 (South) Brigade boundaries and for the remainder within boundaries from 3 April 2012.
- Assume command of British Gurkhas Nepal and British Forces Brunei from 3 January 2012.
- Provide the Land Forces link to the Reserve Forces and Cadets Associations (RFCA) in order to ensure its outputs match the LF requirement. In order to provide land military capability in the most effective and efficient manner.

On 1 September 2015 Support Command was renamed Regional Command. The main duties of GOC Regional Command is to:

- Provide the necessary support to the successful delivery of both UK and overseas operations
- Achieve the specified tasks in support of the achievement of Firm Base Outputs
- Deliver the Firm base, championing overseas support, whilst managing the drawdown in Germany
- Support the sustainment of the Army's Moral Component in order to deliver success on operations, at home, and thereafter the Army of the future.

=== Components ===
==== 2011–2015 ====
In 2014, before Support Command became Regional Command, the command had administrative control of the following units:

- 2 (South East) Brigade
- 15 (North East) Brigade
- 38 (Irish) Brigade
- 42 (North West) Brigade
- 43 (Wessex) Brigade
- 49 (East) Brigade
- 51 (Scottish) Brigade
- 143 (West Midlands) Brigade
- 145 (South) Brigade
- 160 (Welsh) Brigade
- British Forces Brunei
- British Gurkhas Nepal
- Aldershot Garrison
- Colchester Garrison
- Catterick Garrison

==== 2015–2024 ====
Under the Army 2020 reorganisation programme, the command began assisting 1st (UK) Division in managing the seven infantry brigades in the Adaptable Force. In late 2014 / early 2015, 2nd, 15th, 43rd, 49th, 143rd and 145th Brigades merged with the other brigades, leaving seven brigades in the Adaptable Force and two other Regional Points of Command in Force Troops Command. The command remains based at Aldershot and, from Spring 2015, had operational control of the nine Regional Points of Command which are:

- Headquarters North East
- Headquarters East
- Headquarters South East
- Headquarters North West
- Headquarters Scotland
- Headquarters West Midlands
- Headquarters South West
- 38th (Irish) Brigade
- 160th (Welsh) Brigade

==== 2024–Present ====
The current organisation is as follows:

- Headquarters Centre
- Headquarters South East
- Headquarters South West
- Headquarters North
- 38th (Irish) Brigade
- 51st Infantry Brigade and Headquarters Scotland
- 160th (Welsh) Brigade

== Commanders ==
Commanders include:

- January 2012 - August 2013 Major-General Colin Boag
- August 2013 - June 2015 Major-General Robert Nitsch
- June 2015 - June 2017 Major-General Richard Stanford
- June 2017 - February 2020 Major-General Duncan Capps
- February 2020 - July 2022 Major-General David Eastman
- July 2022 – August 2023 Major-General Jonathan Swift
- August 2023 – July 2026 Major General James Senior
- July 2026 – present Major General Justin Stenhouse
