= Kendrew Barracks =

British Army barracks in Rutland, England

- Near Cottesmore, Rutland in England
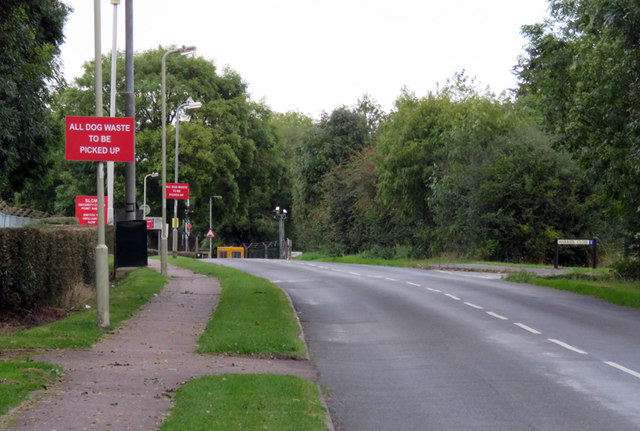
- The approach road to Kendrew Barracks in 2016

Site information
- Type: Army Barracks
- Owner: Ministry of Defence
- Operator: British Army
- Controlled by: 1st (UK) Division
- Condition: Operational

Location
- Location in Rutland
- Coordinates: 52°43′46″N 000°39′5″W
- Area: 379 hectares (940 acres)

Site history
- Built: 1938 (as RAF Cottesmore)
- In use: 2012 – present (as barracks)

Garrison information
- Garrison: 7th Light Mechanised Brigade Combat Team

Kendrew Barracks is a British Army barracks located 1.1 miles (1.8 km) north east of Cottesmore, Rutland, England. The barracks opened in 2012, at the site of former RAF Cottesmore.

== History ==
=== RAF Cottesmore ===
RAF Cottesmore opened in 1938 and operated until 2012. It was home to both the Royal Air Force and the United States Army Air Forces during its lifetime. Cottesmore was the home of the Tri-National Tornado Training Establishment which trained Panavia Tornado crews, and was the last operational home of the British Aerospace Harrier II.

=== Transfer to British Army ===
In July 2011, Defence Secretary Liam Fox announced that Cottesmore would house the British Army's East of England Multi-Role Brigade. The Army took over the site in April 2012 and Kendrew Barracks was officially opened in October 2012 by the Duke of Gloucester. The new barracks were named after Major General Sir Douglas Kendrew.

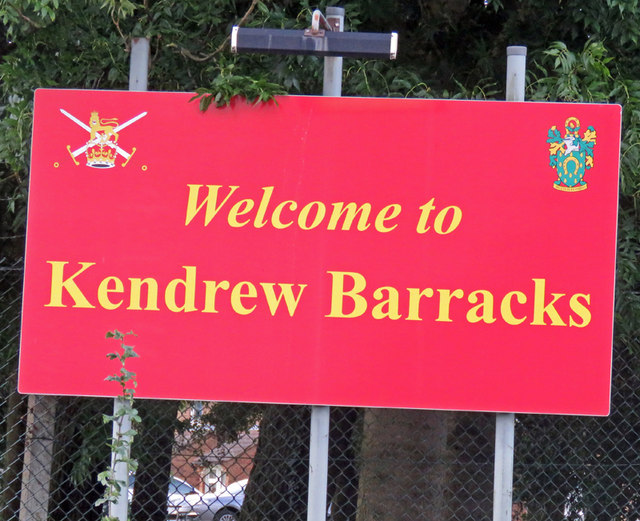
Sign at the entrance to Kendrew Barracks

The barracks became home to the 2nd Battalion, Royal Anglian Regiment, which moved from Dhekelia Garrison, Cyprus in 2012. A second regiment, 7 Regiment, Royal Logistic Corps, moved to the base in June 2013.

From 2017 to 2019, the barracks was home to 2nd Battalion, Princess of Wales's Royal Regiment.

As of 1 November 2018, there were 1,127 troops assigned to the units based at the barracks.

On completion of their Cyprus tour in 2023, the 1st Battalion, Royal Anglian Regiment (known as the Vikings) moved to the barracks to join the 2nd Battalion (known as the Poachers), which will remain at Kendrew Barracks. In the future, the Royal Anglian Regiment will no longer participate directly in Cyprus rotations, and therefore will be based at Kendrew Barracks for the foreseeable future.

== Future ==
Work to construct new facilities for the 1st Military Working Dog Regiment of the Royal Army Veterinary Corps is expected to be completed in December 2025. The regiment will relocate from St George's Barracks, North Luffenham, which is expected to close in 2026. Eleven new buildings are to be constructed, with four being refurbished or retrofitted, providing 173 kennels for permanent, isolation and quarantine requirements. The £61 million project also includes a veterinary centre and training facilities, squadron offices, stores, gym and the repurposing of hanger B as a regimental headquarters and quartermaster stores.

== Based units ==
The following notable units are based at Kendrew Barracks.

=== British Army ===
- Queen's Division
  - 1st Battalion, Royal Anglian Regiment
  - 2nd Battalion, Royal Anglian Regiment

- 7th Light Mechanised Brigade Combat Team
- Headquarters Centre

== See also ==
- List of British Army installations
