= 38th (Irish) Brigade =

38th (Irish) Brigade 38th (Irish) Brigade & HQ Northern Ireland 38th Infantry Brigade
- Brigade insignia
- Active: 1942–1947; 2007–present
- Country: United Kingdom
- Branch: British Army
- Size: Brigade
- Part of: Regional Command
- Garrison/HQ: Thiepval Barracks, Lisburn
- Motto: "Ubique et Semper Fidelis"
- Engagements: Second World War

Commanders
- Current commander: Brigadier Jamie Murray
- Notable commanders: Morgan John Winthrop O'Donovan

The 38th (Irish) Brigade, is an administrative headquarters of the British Army that served in the Second World War as a fully functional infantry brigade. It was composed of Northern Ireland line infantry regiments and served with distinction in the Tunisian and Italian Campaigns. Following the end of the war, the brigade was disbanded, but was reformed in sixty years later in 2007 and remains the regional formation for Northern Ireland.

== Second World War ==
The 38th Brigade came into existence in 1914, as one of the brigades of 13th (Western) Division, one of the Kitchener's Army war-raised formations. It fought through the war as part of 13th Division.

It was reformed on 13 January 1942 by the re-designation of the 210th Independent Infantry Brigade (Home), a Home Defence formation organised in October 1940. The 210th Brigade had been serving in the Dorset County Division. When that division was disbanded on 24 November 1941, 210 Brigade transferred to the 1st Infantry Division. By then, all of 210 Brigade's English home defence battalions had been posted away and were replaced by the 1st Battalion, Royal Irish Fusiliers, the 6th Battalion, Royal Inniskilling Fusiliers and the 2nd Battalion, London Irish Rifles. Of the three battalions, only the 1st Royal Irish Fusiliers had seen active service, fighting in the Battle of France where they were forced to retreat to Dunkirk and were subsequently evacuated to England.

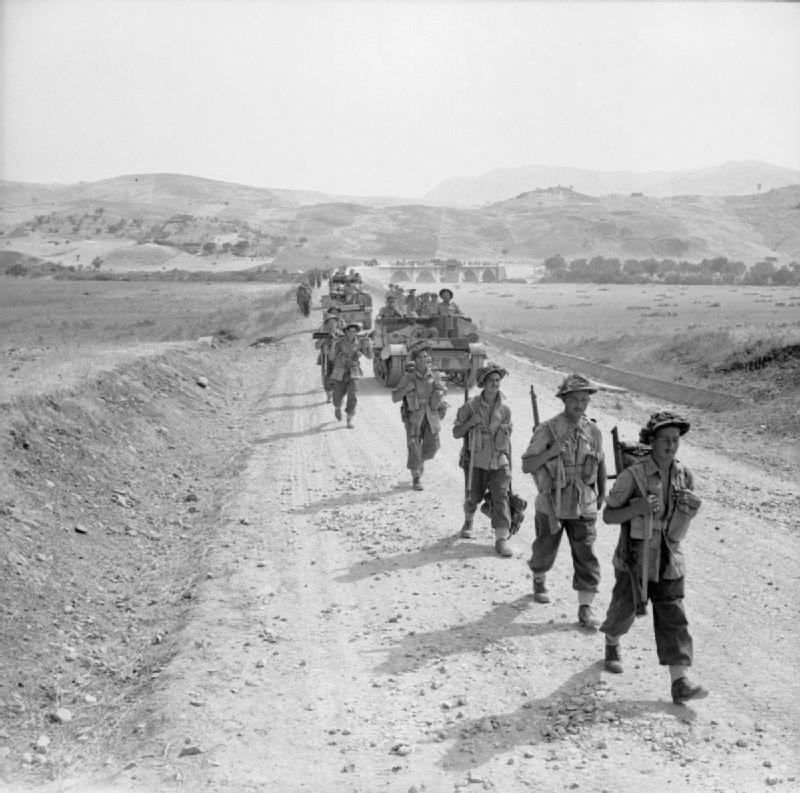
Universal Carriers and troops of the 6th Battalion, Royal Inniskilling Fusiliers, move up to Catenanuova, Sicily, August 1943.

In June 1942, the brigade was transferred from the 1st Infantry Division to the 6th Armoured Division and it landed in North Africa with the division on 22 November 1942, as part of the British First Army. In March 1943, it exchanged with the 1st Guards Brigade and joined the 78th Battleaxe Infantry Division and fought with distinction throughout the rest of the Tunisian Campaign. In late April, the 38th (Irish) Brigade played a lead role in the capture of the German defensive positions in the mountains north of Medjez-el-Bab and the campaign ended in mid-May, with almost 250,000 Axis soldiers surrendering. The brigade were the first marching troops to enter Tunis on 8 May 1943.

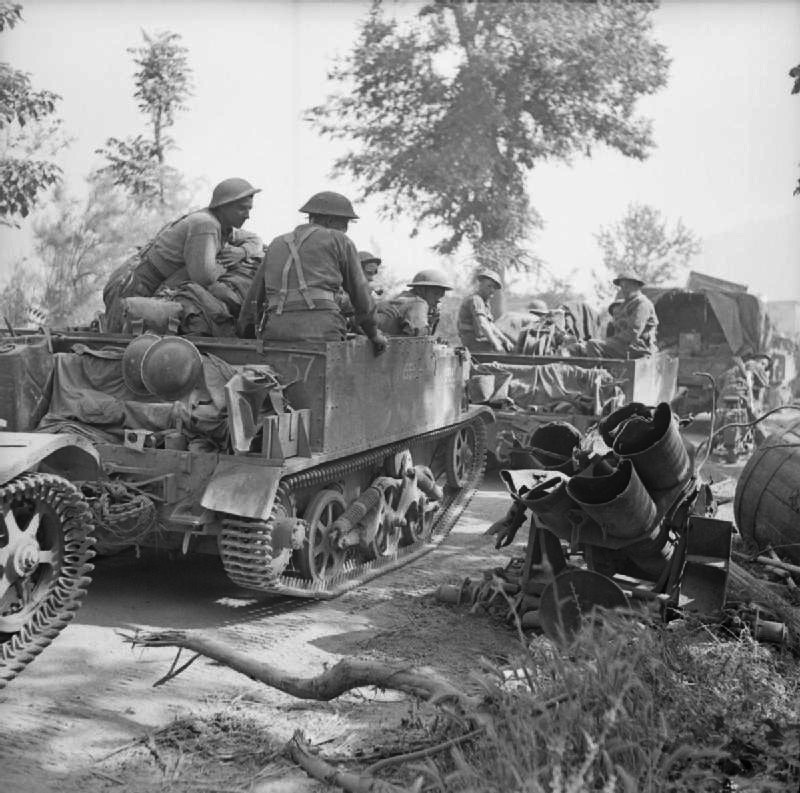
Universal Carriers of the 1st Battalion, Royal Irish Fusiliers pass a wrecked German Nebelwerfer rocket launcher near Ceprano, Italy, 28 May 1944.

After a short rest, the brigade again saw action in the Allied invasion of Sicily (in particular the capture of Centuripe), and in the Italian Campaign, spearheading the British Eighth Army's advance to the Volturno Line, and later at the Battle of Monte Cassino and at Lake Trasimene. Shortly afterwards, the brigade was sent to rest in Egypt. While there, the 6th Inniskillings was disbanded and the men transferred to the 2nd Battalion, another Regular Army unit, which had arrived from 13th Brigade of the 5th Division, and the surplus men were transferred to fill gaps in the other battalions of the brigade.

The rest was short-lived, however, and the brigade soon returned to Italy where it was involved in fighting north of Florence, followed later by Operation Grapeshot. During May 1945, it was (briefly) detached to both 46th Infantry and 6th Armoured Divisions and the brigade then was allotted occupation duties in Carinthia in southern Austria, before being formally disbanded in April 1947.

=== Order of battle ===
The 38th Brigade was constituted as follows during the war:

- 1st Battalion, Royal Irish Fusiliers
- 2nd Battalion, London Irish Rifles
- 6th Battalion, Royal Inniskilling Fusiliers (disbanded 5 August 1944)
- 2nd Battalion, Royal Inniskilling Fusiliers (from 26 July 1944)

=== Commanders ===
The following officers commanded the 38th Brigade during the war:

- Brigadier Morgan O'Donovan (12 January 1942 – 1 July 1942)
- Brigadier Nelson Russell (1 July 1942 – 20 February 1944)
- Brigadier Thomas (Pat) Scott (from 20 February 1944)

=== Formations served under ===
Formations that the brigade served under included:

- 1st Infantry Division 25 November 1941 – 7 June 1942
- 6th Armoured Division 9 June 1942 – 16 February 1943
- 'Y" Division 16 Feb 43 – 15 March 1943
- 78th Infantry Division 15 March 1943 – 28 March 1943
- 46th Infantry Division 29 March 1943 – 6 April 1943
- 78th Infantry Division 7 April 1943 – 10 May 1945
- 6th Armoured Division 10 May 1945 – 13 May 1945
- 46th Infantry Division 13 May 1945 – 18 May 1945
- 78th Infantry Division 18 May 1945 – 31 August 1945

== Twenty-first century ==
38th (Irish) Brigade reformed on 1 August 2007, as part of a new combined divisional / brigade structure called HQ Northern Ireland and 38th (Irish) Brigade after the disbandment of HQ Northern Ireland and has its headquarters at Thiepval Barracks in Lisburn.

The 38th Brigade subsequently came under command of the 2nd Division, the regional division for Scotland, the North of England and Northern Ireland, on 1 January 2009. it was now the regional brigade responsible for administering the Army within Northern Ireland. This was the culmination of a drawdown of military headquarters in Northern Ireland, which had seen the disbandment of 3rd Infantry Brigade, 8th Infantry Brigade, 39th Infantry Brigade and 107th (Ulster) Brigade.

Today the Army Reserve soldiers from the brigade have served on operations supporting the Regular Army in the Balkans, on Operation Tosca in Cyprus, on Operation Herrick in Afghanistan and Operation Telic in Iraq. At home the brigade has the key role of providing the Civil Contingency Reaction Force for Northern Ireland. The Brigade Headquarters is also regionally aligned with the Republic of Ireland as part of defence engagement.

=== Current organisation ===
Under the Army 2020 programme, 38th (Irish) Brigade moved from 2nd Division to 1st (United Kingdom) Division and was reorganised into an infantry brigade with three units: Royal Scots Borderers, 1st Battalion Royal Regiment of Scotland, 2nd Battalion The Rifles, and 7th Battalion, The Rifles all in the light infantry role.

However, under the Army 2020 Refine, the brigade was completely reorganised. The following changes occurred: Royal Scots Borderers, 1st Battalion Royal Regiment of Scotland moved to the Specialised Infantry Group; 1st Battalion, Royal Anglian Regiment joined from 7th Infantry Brigade as Light Mechanised Infantry; 7th Battalion, The Rifles joined 20th Armoured Infantry Brigade; and the 8th Battalion, The Rifles was formed and joined the brigade in 2018 as light infantry.

Under the 2019 Field Army reorganisations, the brigade dropped its infantry commitments with the units moving to other commands: 2nd and 8th Battalions, The Rifles joining 51st Infantry Brigade, and 1st Battalion, Royal Anglian Regiment re-joining 7th Infantry Brigade.

- 38th (Irish) Brigade, at Thiepval Barracks, Lisburn
  - 38th (Irish) Brigade Cadet Training Team, at Palace Barracks, Holywood
  - 1st Northern Ireland Battalion, Army Cadet Force, in Belfast
  - 2nd Northern Ireland Battalion, Army Cadet Force, in Belfast

== Bibliography ==
- Ford, Ken (2003) [1999]. Battleaxe Division. Stroud, UK: Sutton Publishing. p. 273 pages. ISBN 0-7509-3199-X.
- Doherty, Richard (1994) [1993]. Clear The Way! History of the 38th (Irish) Brigade. Dublin, Ireland: Irish Academic Press. p. 336 pages. ISBN 0-7165-2542-9.
- O'Sullivan, Edmund (2007) [2007]. All My Brothers. Slough, UK: Edmund O'Sullivan & Family. p. 232 Contains an eyewitness account of serving in the 2nd Battalion of the London Irish Rifles from October 1939 March 1946 including O'Sullivan's involvement in Irish Brigade battles in Tunisia, Sicily and Italy, including at the Battle of Cassino in May 1944.
- Joslen, H. F. (2003) [1960]. Orders of Battle: Second World War, 1939–1945. Uckfield, East Sussex: Naval and Military Press. ISBN 978-1-84342-474-1.
