= Aldershot Garrison =

Military installation in Hampshire, England

Coordinates: 51.2599°N 0.7598°W

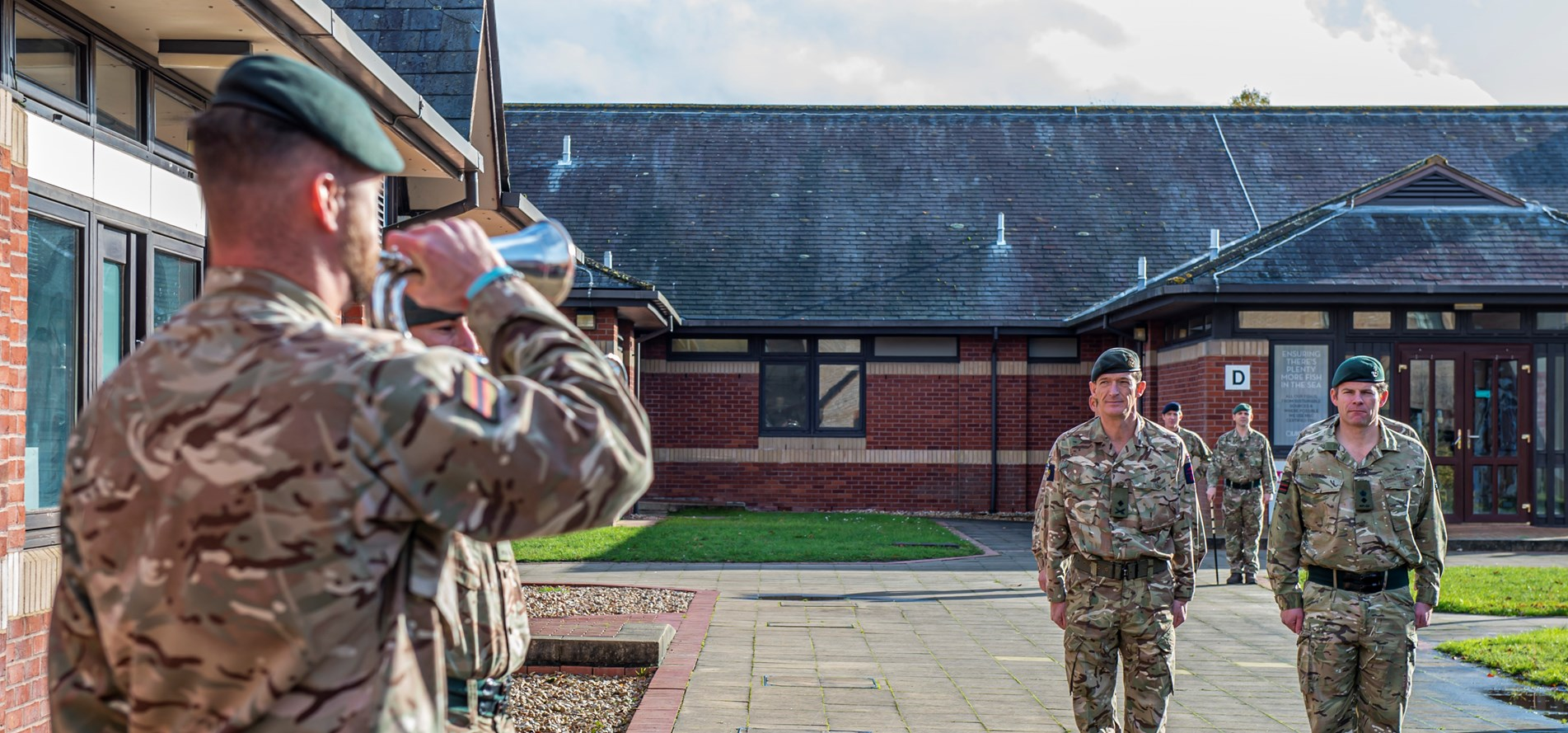
- Maj Gen Rupert Jones awarding operational medals at New Normandy Barracks, Aldershot Garrison

- Location within Hampshire
- Population: 10,500
- District: Rushmoor
- Shire county: Hampshire
- Region: South East
- Country: England
- Sovereign state: United Kingdom
- Post town: ALDERSHOT
- Postcode district: GU11 and GU12
- Dialling code: 01252
- Police: Hampshire and Isle of Wight
- Fire: Hampshire and Isle of Wight
- Ambulance: South East Coast
- UK Parliament: Aldershot

Aldershot Garrison is a major garrison in South East England, between Aldershot and Farnborough in Hampshire. The garrison was established when the War Department bought a large area of land near the village of Aldershot, with the objective of establishing a permanent training camp for the Army. This camp grew into a military town and continues to be used by the Army. It is home to the headquarters of the Army's Regional Command and Home Command. The garrison plays host to around 70 military units and organisations.

In 1972, the garrison was the site of 1972 Aldershot bombing one of the worst UK mainland IRA attacks, when a car bomb was detonated outside the headquarters mess of 16 Parachute Brigade, killing seven and injuring nineteen people. The Official IRA claimed responsibility, stating that the attack was in revenge for the shootings in Derry that came to be known as Bloody Sunday. Following the attack the Army took steps to secure the garrison by erecting security fences around most of the barracks and lines, as well as introducing armed security patrols.

The garrison area covers approximately 200 hectares (490 acres) and its population is about 10,500. Adjacent to the military town is some 2,700 hectares (6,700 acres) of open military training area.

== History ==
Established in 1854, Aldershot has long been seen as the home of the British Army. The garrison was established when the War Department bought a large area of land near to the village of Aldershot, with the objective of establishing a permanent training camp for the British Army. Over time, this camp grew into a military town and continues to be used by the Army to the present day.

=== Beginnings ===
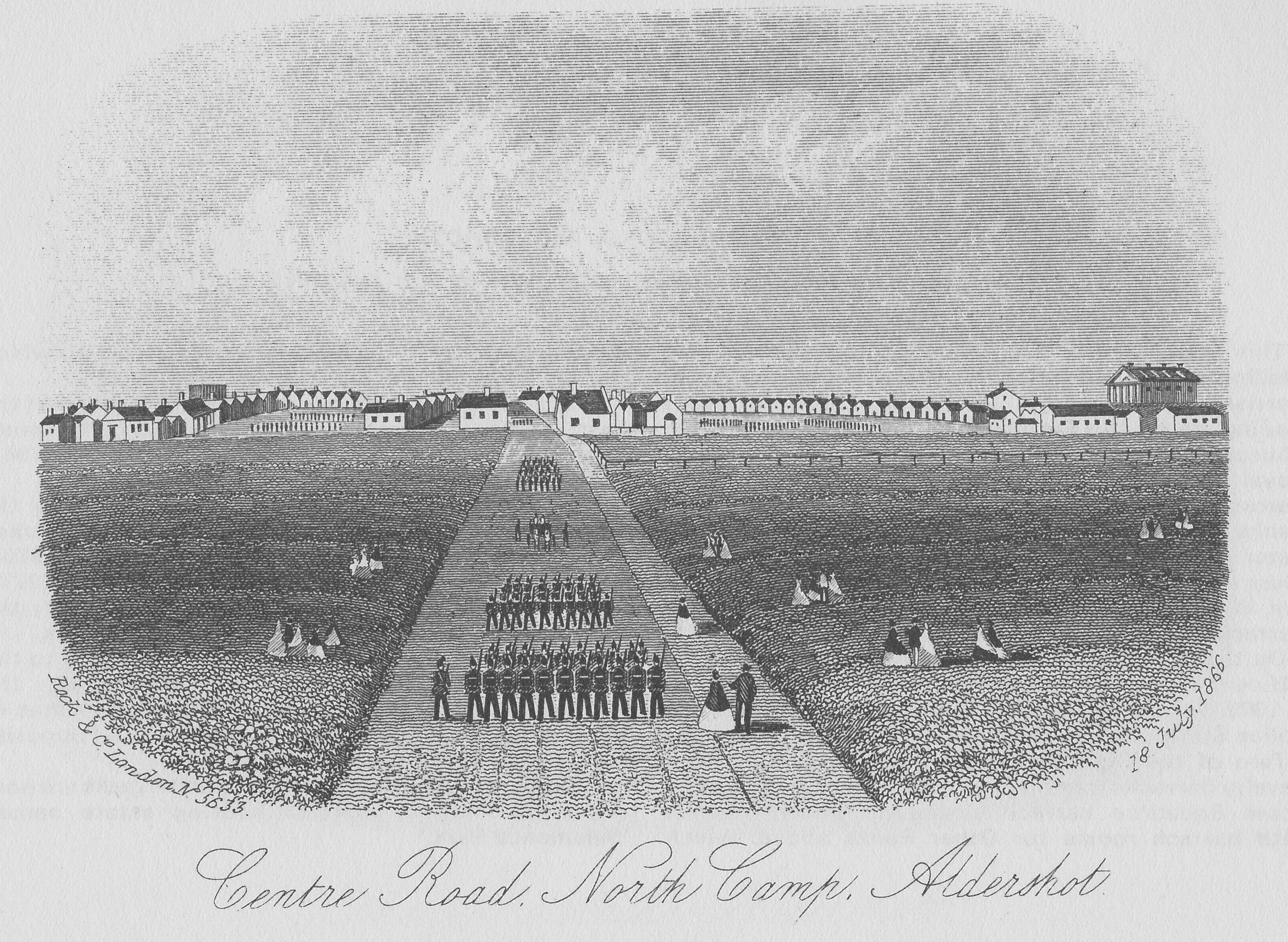
Print showing the wooden barracks of North Camp in 1866

Before the establishment of the 'Camp at Aldershot', the British Army did not have any single permanent camp for training troops on a large scale. Historically, troops had been stationed in long established garrisons, many of which could trace their histories back as mediaeval, or earlier, defensive positions. In 1852, following the death of The Iron Duke, a group of reformers, which included Prince Albert, forged an alliance that would seek to improve the training of the Army. In 1853, a summer camp was established at Chobham Common and two divisional size military exercises were conducted. Following the success of these manoeuvres, it was decided that a permanent camp was needed where such exercises could be regularly conducted. Initially, Reigate was selected as a location that was strategically sound, and close enough to London, to defend against invasion from across the English Channel. Despite its obvious advantages, Reigate was situated in prime agricultural land that would prove too expensive to purchase. Lord Hardinge suggested Aldershot Heath as the location for the new training area, as land was less expensive, but still close enough to the South Coast to defend London. In January 1854, the British Government's War Department purchased areas of heathland around the small village of Aldershot at £12 an acre. By 1861, around 8,000 acres had been purchased.

It was originally only envisaged to set up a tented camp for summer use; however, following the outbreak of the Crimean War, it was necessary to accommodate a large number of troops, over a longer period of time and so two hutted camps, one north and one south of the Basingstoke Canal, were constructed. Between 1854 and 1859, around 1,200 wooden huts were constructed by a local civilian contractor, at a cost of £100,263.

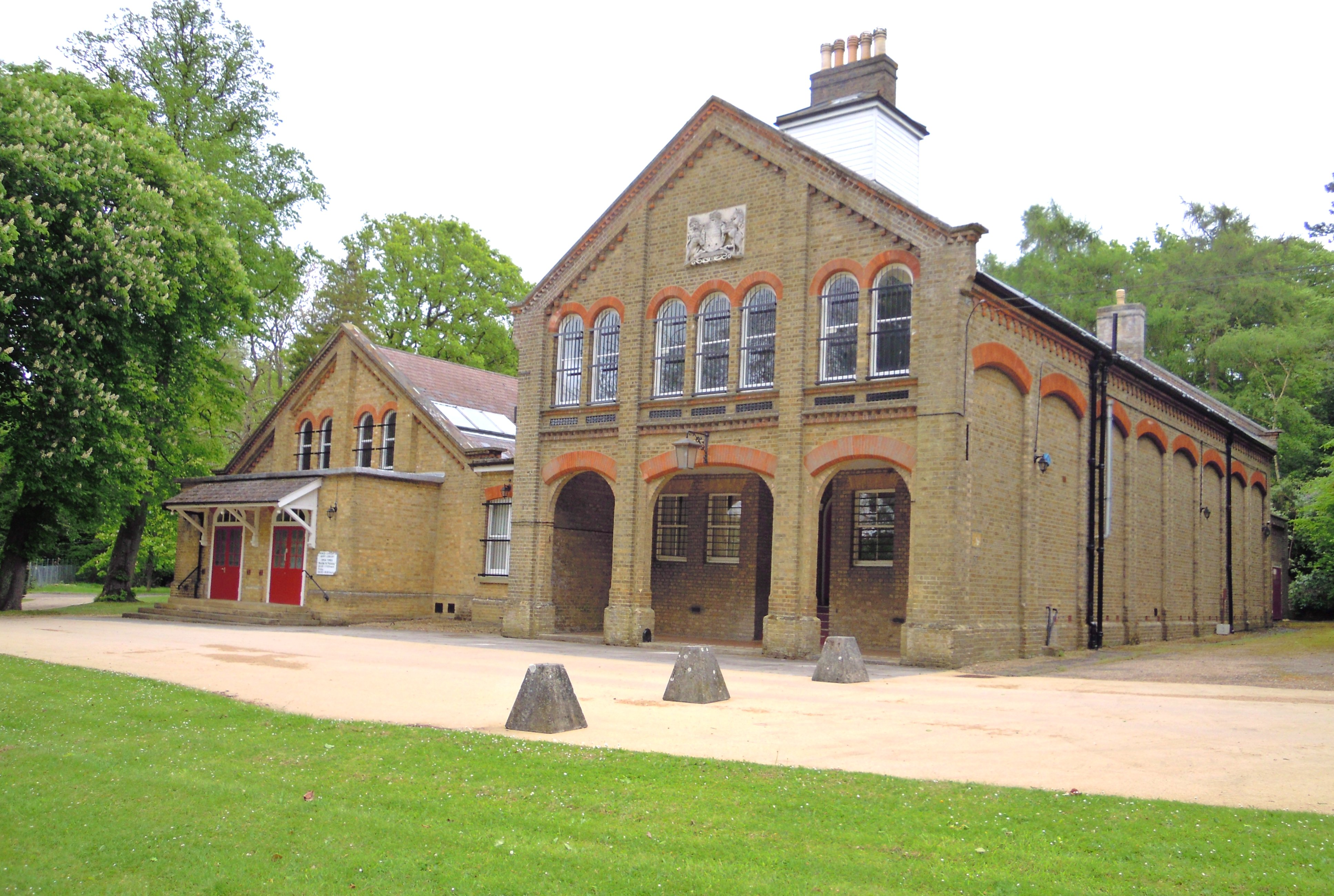
The Prince Consort's Library in 2014

Queen Victoria and Prince Albert showed a keen interest in the establishment and the development of Aldershot as a garrison town. In 1855, they had a wooden Royal Pavilion built, in which they would often stay when attending reviews of the Army. In 1860, Prince Albert established and endowed the Prince Consort's Library.

After the Crimean War, a division of regular troops was permanently based at Aldershot, and 'the Division at Aldershot' (including artillery at Christchurch, Hampshire, and cavalry at Hounslow, Middlesex) became one of the most important home commands of the British Army. In January 1876 a Mobilization Scheme for the forces in Great Britain and Ireland was published, with the Active Army divided into eight army corps based on the major Commands and Districts. The 2nd Corps was headquartered at Aldershot. This scheme disappeared in 1881, when the districts were retitled 'District Commands', with Aldershot usually listed as IX or X. In 1898, (when Queen Victoria's son, the Duke of Connaught, was General Officer Commanding) Aldershot Command was ranked I on the list. From 1901 to 1908 Aldershot Command was given the additional title of I Army Corps.

The garrison subsequently became seen as home to the British Army. This status has been reflected in the use of Aldershot as a headquarters for a variety of regional commands over the last 100 years. HQ Aldershot Command continued in existence until c. February 1941, when it was replaced by HQ Aldershot Area.

=== Later 19th century ===
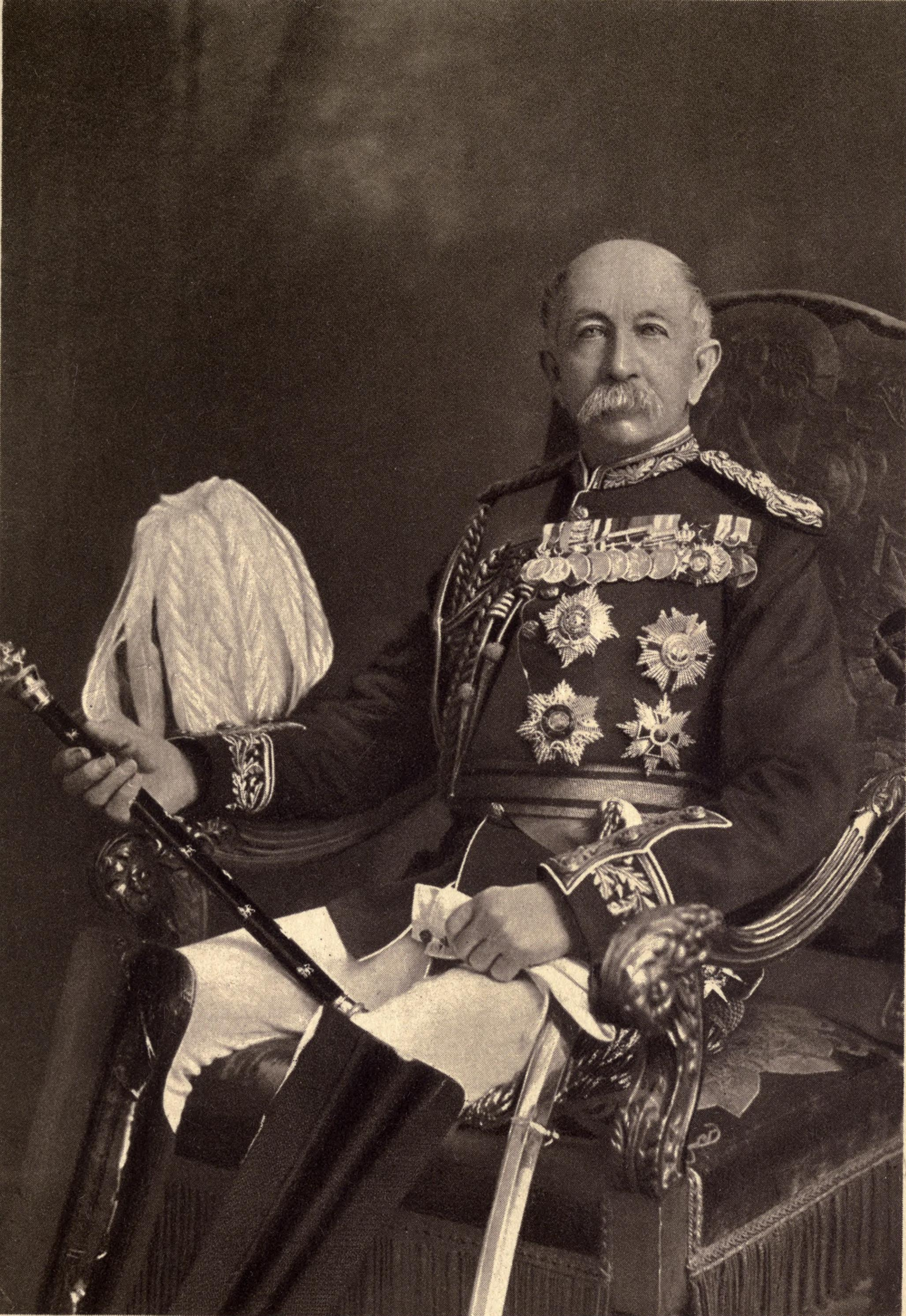
Sir Evelyn Wood, initially a major-general, then promoted to lieutenant-general whilst in post, was appointed commander of Aldershot Division in 1889. He played a significant part in the reconstruction of the original camp

In the late 1870s, it was decided that the original hutted camp needed to be replaced with some more permanent structures. When the wooden huts had been built in the 1850s, the contractor had guaranteed the huts for 13 years; in practice, many of those huts were still serving their purpose some 30 years later. In November 1881, the first steps were taken to convert the hutted camp into permanent barracks. At this time, the first two brick buildings were constructed in North Camp; this was quickly followed by the construction of a number of larger brick-built bungalows to replace the previous wooden designs. Government House was built as the garrison commander's house in 1883. Between 1889 and 1893, the remaining wooden buildings, in both North Camp and South Camp, were replaced by brick buildings. Major-General Sir Evelyn Wood had recently been appointed General Officer Commanding at Aldershot and was keen to push forward the building of the new accommodation. It was also, at his request, that a convention for naming the barracks was formulated. Wood advocated that the new barracks should all be named to commemorate famous British victories; initially this proposal met with some resistance, but was eventually adopted. The barracks in Stanhope Lines took names from the famous battles of the Napoleonic Wars and those in Marlborough Lines took names from Marlborough's campaigns. The Military Headquarters Building in Steeles Road was completed in 1895.

=== In the 20th century ===
Smith-Dorrien House, the local social facility for soldiers, was completed in 1909. The garrison used to be the corps headquarters for the Royal Corps of Transport and the Army Catering Corps; when these were merged into the Royal Logistic Corps in 1993, the corps headquarters moved to Deepcut Barracks. Today, the garrison is home to the headquarters of the Regional Command of the British Army, and is also the administrative base for 101st Operational Sustainment Brigade. The garrison plays host to around 70 military units and organisations.

==== 1972 IRA bombing ====
On 22 February 1972, Aldershot experienced one of the worst UK mainland IRA attacks of the time. Seven people, all civilian support staff, including cooks, cleaners, and a Catholic priest, were killed and 19 people were injured, in a car bomb attack on the 16th Parachute Brigade headquarters mess at Aldershot garrison. This blast was later claimed, by the Official IRA, as revenge for the shootings in Derry that came to be known as Bloody Sunday. Until then, the military town had been open-plan, but the attack led to immediate action to secure military property. A memorial stone was placed on the site of the bombing.

The headquarters for the Army Special Operations Brigade was located in Aldershot until its disbandment circa 2026.

== Barracks, buildings and geography ==
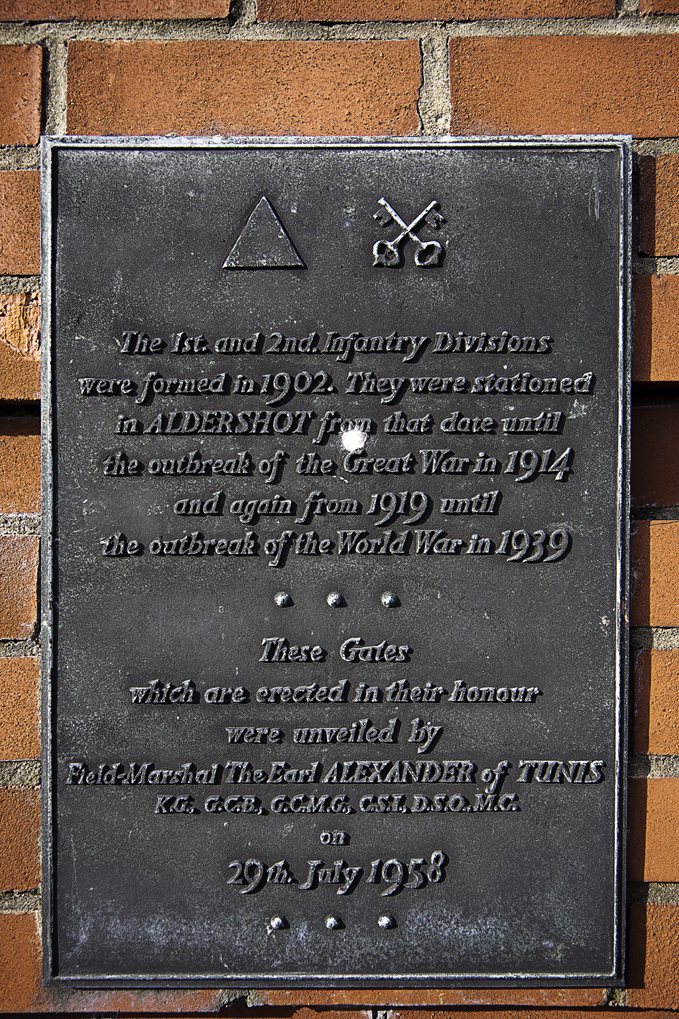
1st & 2nd Infantry Division Gates at Aldershot's Royal Garrison Church - All Saints

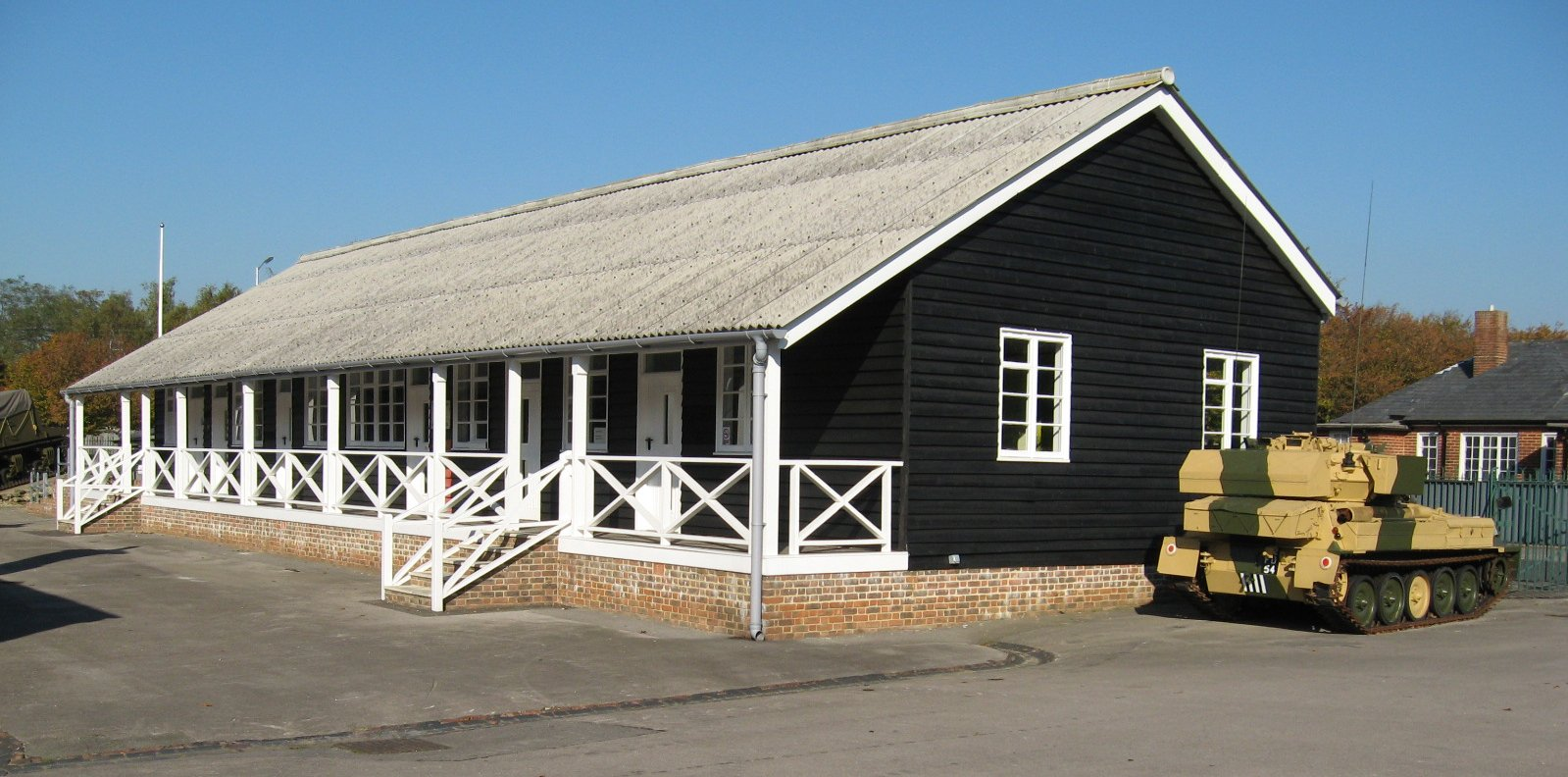
Historic wooden barrack bungalow, now part of the Aldershot Military Museum

=== Historical military town ===
Following Aldershot's establishment as a large permanent training camp in the 1850s, the military presence continued to grow. The garrison was divided into the North Camp and the South Camp, either side of the Basingstoke Canal. As more soldiers arrived, they were first housed in bell tents due to a shortage of permanent accommodation. Later, wooden huts were built, which were in turn replaced by brick built barracks in the 1890s. Much of the Victorian camp was demolished in the 1960s.

==== North Camp ====
Prior to 1890, Aldershot garrison lacked permanent accommodation to house the growing military presence. Following the Barracks Act 1890 (53 & 54 Vict. c. 25) North Camp was rebuilt with brick barracks named: Blenheim, Lille, Malplaquet, Oudenarde, Ramillies and Tournay. The new barracks were built by Henry Wells, a locally based building contractor. This group of barracks then became known as the Marlborough Lines. Today, the only surviving barracks of the Marlborough Lines group is Lille barracks. The Victorian buildings were largely demolished in 1958, and then rebuilt with more modern facilities, although the original officers' mess survives. North Camp station is the garrison's original railway station.

==== South Camp ====
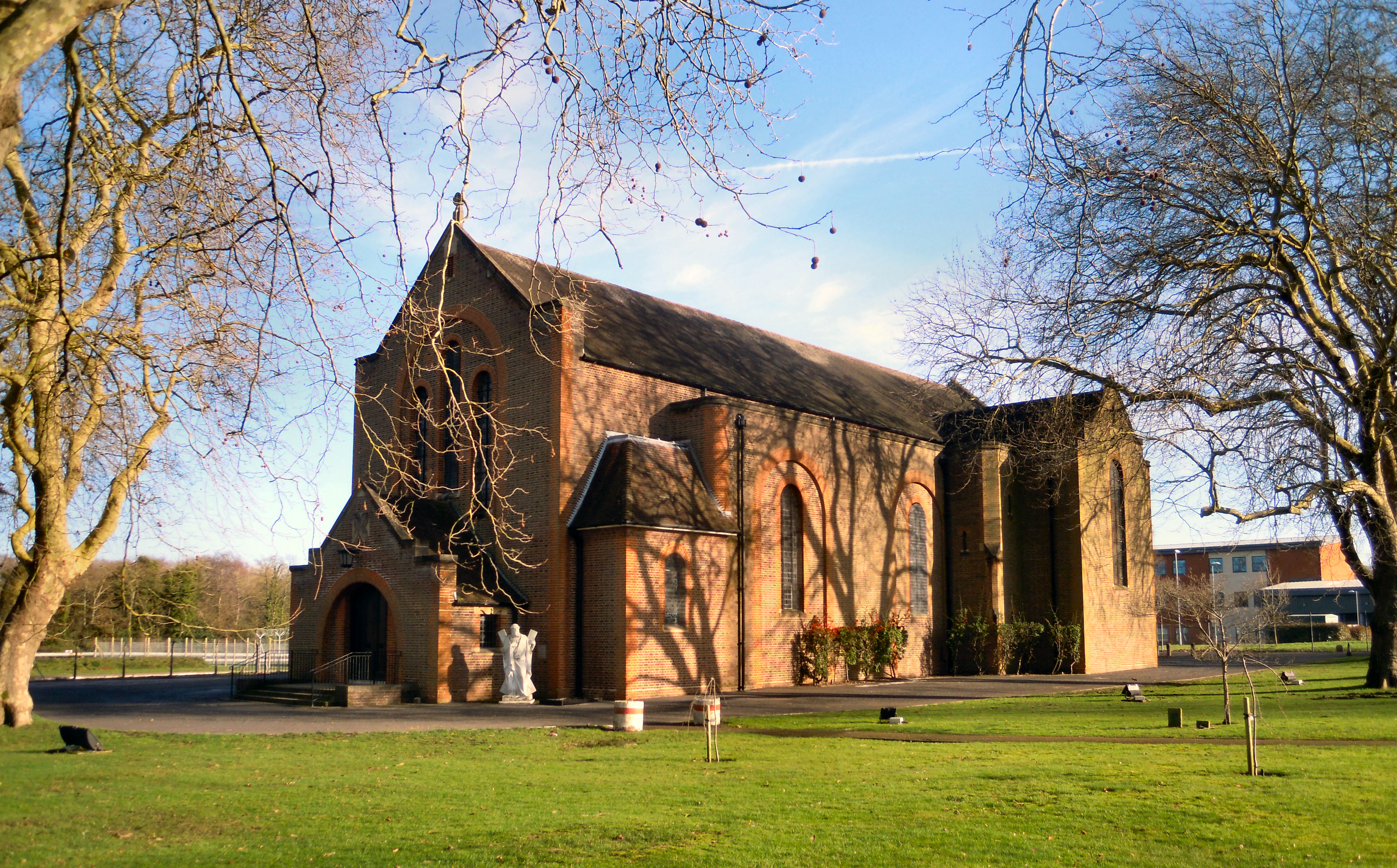
St Andrews Garrison Church

The area known as South Camp was rebuilt at much the same time as North Camp. Construction was completed by the same local company responsible for Marlborough Lines. This phase of construction saw nine barracks built, namely: Albuhera, Barossa, Corunna, Gibraltar, Maida, Buller, Mandora and McGrigor barracks. This group of barracks became known as Stanhope Lines. Many of these brick-build Victorian barracks were demolished in the late 1960s, to make way for what is now Montgomery Lines. One of the Victorian barracks did survive. Montgomery Lines was completed in the 1970s and was built on the site of several barracks that formerly made up Stanhope Lines. Much of South Camp has now been redeveloped as part of the Aldershot Urban Extension.

=== Modern military town ===
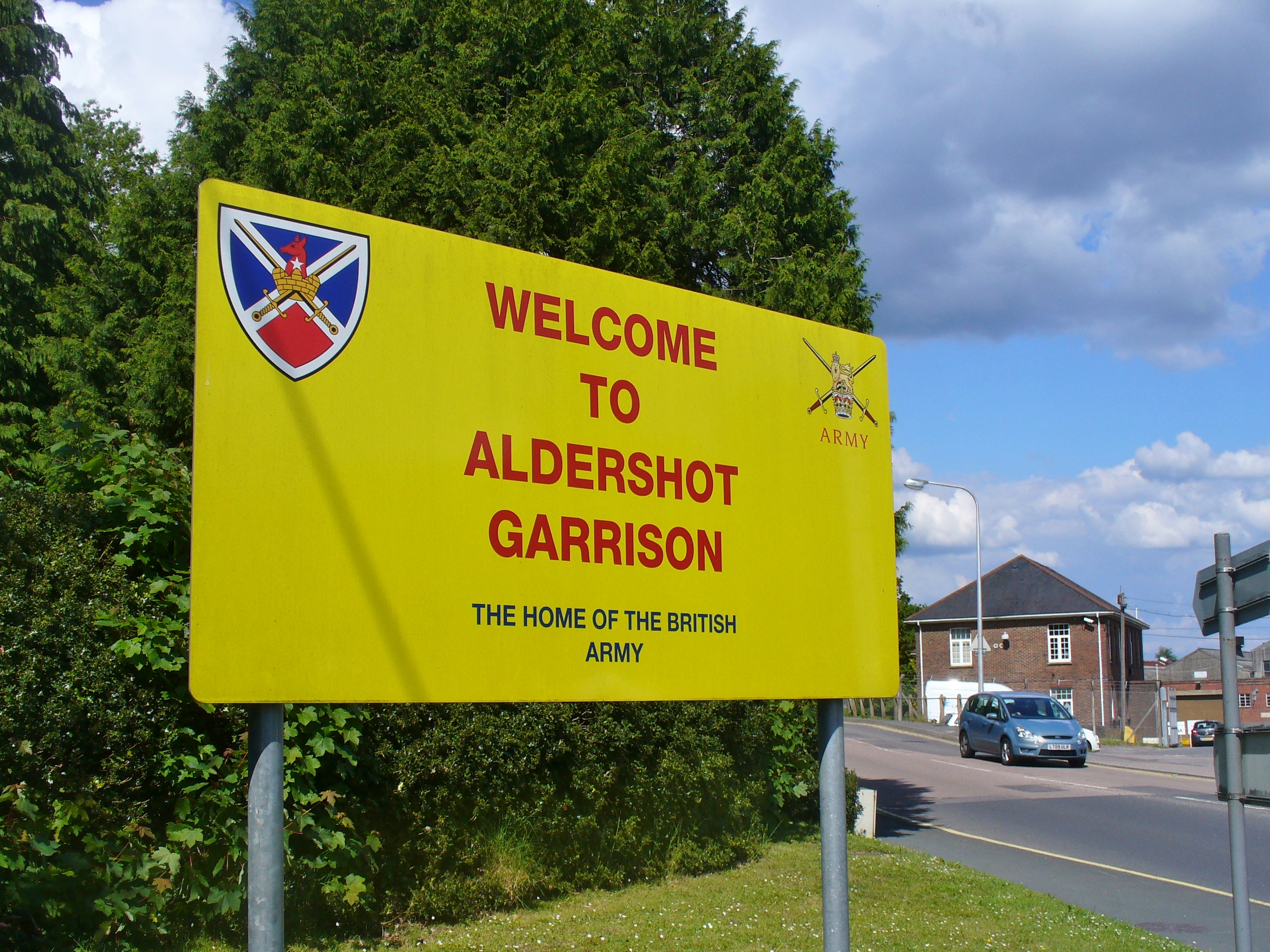
Welcome sign for Aldershot Garrison town

Today, the military town has a population of around 10,500. This consists of around 3,900 resident soldiers, some 1,000 transient military personnel on courses or sport, 770 MoD Civil Servants and some 5,000 service dependents. The garrison contains 2,145 Service Family Accommodation quarters. The rest of the garrison comprises barracks, the Aldershot Military Stadium, Queen's Parade playing fields, Garrison Sports Centre and the Aldershot Centre For Health, which is a joint MoD and local authority venture. The garrison is mostly centred around the crossroads that join Queen's Avenue and Alison's Road. The military town includes local landmarks such as the Aldershot Observatory, Wellington Statue, the RAMC Memorial, Aldershot Military Cemetery, the Royal Garrison Church and other churches. Adjacent to the military town is some 2,700 hectares of open military training area, which is open to the public when not in use for military purposes.

== Barracks ==
Current barracks which encompass the garrison include:

- Roebuck House
  - Headquarters, 11th Brigade
  - Headquarters South East
- Montgomery House
  - Headquarters, Home Command
  - Headquarters, Regional Command
- Wellington House
  - Headquarters, Aldershot Garrison
  - Headquarters, 101st Operational Sustainment Brigade
- Saint Omer Barracks
  - Headquarters, Army Special Operations Brigade
- Duchess of Kent Barracks
  - 251 Signal Squadron, 10th Signal Regiment, Royal Corps of Signals
- Travers Barracks
  - 27 Regiment, Royal Logistic Corps
- Gale Barracks
  - 10 Queen's Own Gurkha Logistic Regiment, Royal Logistic Corps
  - G Troop, 562 Transport Squadron, 151 (Greater London) Regiment, Royal Logistic Corps
- Lille Barracks
  - 1st Battalion, Grenadier Guards
- Mons Barracks
  - 1st Battalion, Irish Guards
- New Normandy Barracks
  - 4th Battalion, Ranger Regiment
- Provost Barracks
  - 160 Provost Company, 3 Regiment, Royal Military Police
- Puckridge Barracks
  - Detachment, 101 Military Working Dog Squadron, 1st Military Working Dog Regiment
  - Dog Section, Aldershot Ministry of Defence Guard Service
  - Aldershot Veterinary Troop, Royal Army Veterinary Corps
- Ordnance Barracks
  - Headquarters, Soldier Magazine
  - Aldershot Defence Mail Centre
- Seely House
  - Communication Information Systems (CIS) Troop, 8th Engineer Brigade
  - Headquarters, South East Reserve Forces and Cadets Association
  - 2 (Farnborough) Platoon, Hampshire & Isle of Wight Army Cadet Force
- Thornhill Barracks
  - Aldershot Resettlement Training Centre
  - 413 (Aldershot) Squadron, Hampshire & Isle of Wight Wing, Air Training Corps
  - 1 (Aldershot) Platoon, Hampshire & Isle of Wight Army Cadet Force
- Browning Barracks
  - Military Preparation College for Training
- Fox Lines
  - Regimental Headquarters, Royal Army Physical Training Corps
  - Army School of Physical Training
  - Headquarters, Army Sports Control Board
- Wavell Barracks
- Eelmoor Driver Training Area
  - Combat Service Support Trials and Development Unit (CCS TDU)

== In literature ==
The Aldershot Garrison is referenced in the first paragraph of Rudyard Kipling's poem Gunga Din.

The 1893 Sherlock Holmes story "The Adventure of the Crooked Man" is set in Aldershot Camp. Holmes and Watson investigate the death of an infantry officer in his home at the camp.

== See also ==
- Aldershot 'Glasshouse'
- Aldershot narrow-gauge suspension railway
- Aldershot Command
- Letter from Aldershot, a 1942 Canadian propaganda short set at Aldershot Garrison
