= List of Royal Artillery batteries =

The Royal Regiment of Artillery is an Arm of the British Army. The Regiment is made up of two distinct arms; the Royal Horse Artillery and the Royal Artillery. Somewhat confusingly both consist of a number of Regiments, which are comparable to Battalions in size. Each regiment is made up of a number of Batteries.

== Current Batteries of the Royal Regiment of Artillery ==
The following list includes the Battery name, its battle honour title and the year the Battery was formed. It also includes its equipment or role, and current location.

Battery	Regiment	Equipment and Role	Location	Formed	Remarks	
The King's Troop, Royal Horse Artillery	N/A	Ceremonial	Royal Artillery Barracks, Woolwich Station	1946		Regular
A Battery (The Chestnut Troop)	1st Regiment Royal Horse Artillery	Archer	Assaye Barracks in Tidworth	1793		Regular
B Battery	1st Regiment Royal Horse Artillery	Archer	Assaye Barracks in Tidworth	1793		Regular
E Battery	1st Regiment Royal Horse Artillery	Archer	Assaye Barracks in Tidworth	1794		Regular
L (Néry) Battery	1st Regiment Royal Horse Artillery	Tactical Group Battery	Assaye Barracks in Tidworth	1809		Regular
O Battery (The Rocket Troop)	1st Regiment Royal Horse Artillery	Headquarters Battery	Assaye Barracks in Tidworth	1813		Regular
C Battery	3rd Regiment Royal Horse Artillery	M270A2 MLRS	Albemarle Barracks, Northumberland	1793		Regular
D Battery	3rd Regiment Royal Horse Artillery	M270A2 MLRS	Albemarle Barracks, Northumberland	1794		Regular
J (Sidi Rezegh) Battery	3rd Regiment Royal Horse Artillery	Headquarters Battery	Albemarle Barracks, Northumberland	1805		Regular
3/29 (Corunna) Battery	4th Regiment Royal Artillery	L118 light gun	Alanbrooke Barracks, North Yorkshire	1745		Regular
6/36 (Arcot) Battery	4th Regiment Royal Artillery	L118 light gun	Alanbrooke Barracks, North Yorkshire	1993		Regular
88 (Arracan) Battery	4th Regiment Royal Artillery	L118 light gun	Alanbrooke Barracks, North Yorkshire	1802		Regular
94 (New Zealand) Battery	4th Regiment Royal Artillery	Headquarters Battery	Alanbrooke Barracks, North Yorkshire	1803		Regular
97 Battery (Lawson's Company) Royal Artillery	4th Regiment Royal Artillery	Tactical Group Battery	Alanbrooke Barracks, North Yorkshire	1803		Regular
129 (Dragon) Battery	4th Regiment Royal Artillery	Tactical Group Battery	Alanbrooke Barracks, North Yorkshire			Regular
K (Hondeghem) Battery	5th Regiment Royal Artillery	Surveillance and Target Acquisition	Marne Barracks, Catterick Garrison	1809	Supports Reaction Force Brigade	Regular
P Battery (The Dragon Troop)	5th Regiment Royal Artillery	Surveillance and Target Acquisition	Marne Barracks, Catterick Garrison	1816	Supports Reaction Force Brigade	Regular
Q (Sanna's Post) Battery	5th Regiment Royal Artillery	Headquarters Battery	Marne Barracks, Catterick Garrison	1824		Regular
4/73 (Sphinx) Special Observation Post Battery	5th Regiment Royal Artillery	Long-range reconnaissance patrol	Marne Barracks, Catterick Garrison	1989		Regular
53 (Louisburg) Air Assault Battery	5th Regiment Royal Artillery	Surveillance and Target Acquisition	Marne Barracks, Catterick Garrison	1740	Supports 16 Air Assault Brigade	Regular
93 (Le Cateau) Battery	5th Regiment Royal Artillery	Surveillance and Target Acquisition	Marne Barracks, Catterick Garrison		Supports Reaction Force Brigade	Regular
F (Sphinx) Parachute Battery	7th Parachute Regiment Royal Horse Artillery	L118 light gun	Merville Barracks, Colchester Garrison	1800		Regular
G Parachute Battery (Mercer's Troop)	7th Parachute Regiment Royal Horse Artillery	L118 light gun	Merville Barracks, Colchester Garrison	1801		Regular
I Parachute Battery (Bull's Troop)	7th Parachute Regiment Royal Horse Artillery	Headquarters Battery	Merville Barracks, Colchester Garrison	1805		Regular
N Parachute Battery (The Eagle Troop)	7th Parachute Regiment Royal Horse Artillery	Tactical Group Battery	Albemarle Barracks, Northumberland	1811		Regular
T Battery (Shah Sujah's Troop)	12th Regiment Royal Artillery	Stormer HVM & LMM	Baker Barracks, Thorney Island	1838		Regular
9 (Plassey) Battery	12th Regiment Royal Artillery	Stormer HVM & LMM	Baker Barracks, Thorney Island	1748		Regular
12 (Minden) Air Assault Battery	12th Regiment Royal Artillery	LML HVM & LMM	Baker Barracks, Thorney Island		Very High Readiness	Regular
58 (Eyre's) Battery	12th Regiment Royal Artillery	Stormer HVM & LMM	Baker Barracks, Thorney Island	1786		Regular
137 (Java) Battery	12th Regiment Royal Artillery	Stormer HVM & LMM	Baker Barracks, Thorney Island	1857		Regular
170 (Imjin) Battery	12th Regiment Royal Artillery	Headquarters Battery	Baker Barracks, Thorney Island	1857		Regular
1 Battery	14th Regiment Royal Artillery	Training	Larkhill, Wiltshire			Regular
24 (Irish) Battery	14th Regiment Royal Artillery	Training	Larkhill, Wiltshire			Regular
34 (Seringapatam) Battery	14th Regiment Royal Artillery	Training	Larkhill, Wiltshire	1900		Regular
11 (Sphinx) Battery	16th Regiment Royal Artillery	Sky Sabre	Baker Barracks, Thorney Island	1755		Regular
14 (Cole's Kop) Battery	16th Regiment Royal Artillery	Sky Sabre	Baker Barracks, Thorney Island			Regular
20 Battery	16th Regiment Royal Artillery	Headquarters Battery	Baker Barracks, Thorney Island	1771		Regular
30 Battery (Rogers's Company)	16th Regiment Royal Artillery	Sky Sabre	Baker Barracks, Thorney Island	1759		Regular
32 (Minden 1759) Battery	16th Regiment Royal Artillery	Sky Sabre	Baker Barracks, Thorney Island			Regular
49 (Inkerman) Battery	16th Regiment Royal Artillery	Land Environment Air Picture Provision	Baker Barracks, Thorney Island	1779	Commanded by an RAF Squadron Leader and has RAF personnel	Regular
5 (Gibraltar 1779–83) Battery	19th Regiment Royal Artillery	Archer	Tidworth, Wiltshire			Regular
13 (Martinique 1809) Battery	19th Regiment Royal Artillery	Headquarters Battery	Tidworth, Wiltshire			Regular
28/143 Battery (Tombs's Troop)	19th Regiment Royal Artillery	Archer	Tidworth, Wiltshire			Regular
127 (Dragon) Battery	19th Regiment Royal Artillery	Archer	Tidworth, Wiltshire			Regular
19 (Gibraltar) Battery	26th Regiment Royal Artillery	M270A2 MLRS	Mansergh Barracks, Westfalen Garrison			Regular
55 (The Residency) Battery	26th Regiment Royal Artillery	Headquarters Battery	Mansergh Barracks, Westfalen Garrison			Regular
132 Battery (The Bengal Rocket Troop)	26th Regiment Royal Artillery	M270A2 MLRS	Albemarle Barracks	1816	Status Uncertain under Army 2020 Refine	Regular
159 (Colenso) Battery	26th Regiment Royal Artillery	M270A2 MLRS	Mansergh Barracks, Westfalen Garrison		Status Uncertain under Army 2020 Refine	Regular
176 (Abu Klea) Battery	26th Regiment Royal Artillery	EXACTOR 2	Tidworth, Wiltshire	1860	To move to 26 RA under Army 2020 refine	Regular
7 (Sphinx) Commando Battery	29th Commando Regiment Royal Artillery	L118 light gun	Royal Citadel, Plymouth		Northern Littoral Group	Regular
8 (Alma) Commando Battery	29th Commando Regiment Royal Artillery	L118 light gun	Royal Citadel, Plymouth		Southern Littoral Group	Regular
23 (Gibraltar) Commando Battery	29th Commando Regiment Royal Artillery	Headquarters Battery	Royal Citadel, Plymouth			Regular
79 (Kirkee) Commando Battery	29th Commando Regiment Royal Artillery	LML HVM & LMM	Royal Citadel, Plymouth			Regular
148 (Meiktila) Commando Battery	29th Commando Regiment Royal Artillery	Naval Gunfire Support Forward Observation	Royal Citadel, Plymouth			Regular
18 (Quebec 1759) Battery	32nd Regiment Royal Artillery	UAS Protected Mobility	Roberts Barracks, Larkhill	1759		Regular
21 (Gibraltar 1779–83) Battery	32nd Regiment Royal Artillery	Very High Readiness Air Assault UAS Battery	Roberts Barracks, Larkhill	1756	.	Regular
22 (Gibraltar 1779–83) Battery	32nd Regiment Royal Artillery	UAS Armoured Battery	Roberts Barracks, Larkhill	1756	.	Regular
42 (Alem Hamza) Battery	32nd Regiment Royal Artillery	UAS Armoured Battery	Roberts Barracks, Larkhill			Regular
46 (Talavera) Battery	32nd Regiment Royal Artillery	Headquarters Battery	Roberts Barracks, Larkhill	1778	.	Regular
10 (Assaye) Battery	47th Regiment Royal Artillery	UAS	Horne Barracks, Larkhill		Supports Reaction Force Brigade and Divisional Assets	Regular
31 Battery	47th Regiment Royal Artillery	Headquarters Battery	Horne Barracks, Larkhill			Regular
43 (Lloyd's Company) Battery	47th Regiment Royal Artillery	UAS	Horne Barracks, Larkhill		Supports Reaction Force Brigade and Divisional Assets	Regular
57 (Bhurtpore) Battery	47th Regiment Royal Artillery	UAS	Horne Barracks, Larkhill	1786	.	Regular
74 Battery (The Battle Axe Company)	47th Regiment Royal Artillery	UAS	Horne Barracks, Larkhill	1801	Supports Reaction Force Brigade and Divisional Assets	Regular
59 (Asten) Battery	1 Army Training Regiment	Training	Alexander Barracks, Pirbright			Regular
221 (Wessex) Battery	100th (Yeomanry) Regiment Royal Artillery	Royal Artillery Specialist Pool				Reserve
255 (Somerset Yeomanry) Battery	100th (Yeomanry) Regiment Royal Artillery	Tactical Air Control Party Battery				Reserve
203 (Elswick) Battery	101st (Northumbrian) Regiment Royal Artillery	M270A2 MLRS		1900		Reserve
204 (Tyneside Scottish) Battery	101st (Northumbrian) Regiment Royal Artillery	M270A2 MLRS		1967		Reserve
205 (3rd Durham Volunteer Artillery) Battery	101st (Northumbrian) Regiment Royal Artillery	M270A2 MLRS		1860		Reserve
269 (West Riding) Battery	101st (Northumbrian) Regiment Royal Artillery	M270A2 MLRS	Leeds	1975		Reserve
208 (3rd West Lancashire) Battery	103rd (Lancashire Artillery Volunteers) Regiment Royal Artillery	L118 light gun				Reserve
209 (Manchester Artillery) Battery	103rd (Lancashire Artillery Volunteers) Regiment Royal Artillery	L118 light gun				Reserve
210 (Staffordshire) Battery	103rd (Lancashire Artillery Volunteers) Regiment Royal Artillery	L118 light gun				Reserve
216 (Bolton Artillery) Battery	103rd (Lancashire Artillery Volunteers) Regiment Royal Artillery	L118 light gun				Reserve
211 (South Wales) Battery	104th Regiment Royal Artillery	L118 light gun				Reserve
214 (Worcestershire) Battery	104th Regiment Royal Artillery	L118 light gun				Reserve
217 (City of Newport) Battery	104th Regiment Royal Artillery	L118 light gun	Raglan Barracks, Newport			Reserve
266 (Gloucestershire Volunteer Artillery) Battery	104th Regiment Royal Artillery	L118 light gun	Whiteladies Road, Bristol	1859		Reserve
206 (Ulster) Battery	105th Regiment Royal Artillery	L118 light gun	Newtownards and Coleraine	1967		Reserve
207 (City of Glasgow) Battery	105th Regiment Royal Artillery	L118 light gun	Partick	1967		Reserve
212 (Highland) Battery	105th Regiment Royal Artillery	L118 light gun	Arbroath, Kirkcaldy and Lerwick			Reserve
278 (Lowland) Battery	105th Regiment Royal Artillery	L118 light gun	Livingston	1859	Reformed in 2014	Reserve
265 (Home Counties) Battery	106th (Yeomanry) Regiment Royal Artillery	LML HVM & LMM	Grove Park, Lewisham		supports 16 Air Assault Brigade, role to be determined under Army 2020 Refine	Reserve
295 (Hampshire Yeomanry) Battery	106th (Yeomanry) Regiment Royal Artillery	Stormer HVM & LMM	Portsmouth	1794	role to be determined under Army 2020 Refine	Reserve
457 (Hampshire Carabiniers Yeomanry) Battery	106th (Yeomanry) Regiment Royal Artillery	Stormer HVM & LMM	Southampton		role to be determined under Army 2020 Refine	Reserve

== Regular Batteries in Suspended Animation (By order of Seniority) ==
Units in Suspended Animation are not disbanded and remain on the Royal Regiment of Artillery's Order of Battle and maintain their order of precedence alongside Active Regular units. Their property, histories etc. are stored and they may be brought out of Suspended Animation at a later stage, unlike disbanded units which cease to exist and cannot be reanimated. The precedence of Regular batteries is by date of formation and was authorised by The Master Gunner in his decree of 1 November 1986. Precedence is accorded to RHA Batteries (despite their younger age) by authority of Queens Regulations 1975 para 8.001.

Royal Horse Artillery

- M Battery
- R Battery
- S Battery
- U Battery
- V Parachute Battery
- W Battery
- X Battery
- Y Battery
- Z Battery
- AA Battery
- BB Battery
- CC Battery
- DD Battery

Royal Artillery

- 15 (HQ) Battery
- 16 Battery (Sandham's Company)
- 17 (Corunna) Battery
- 104 Battery
- 105 Battery
- 106 Battery
- 107 Battery
- 108 Battery
- 109 Battery
- 110 Battery
- 111 (Dragon) Battery
- 113 Battery
- 124 Battery
- 126 Battery
- 128 Battery
- 137 (Java) Battery
- 145 (Maiwand) Battery
- 152 (Inkerman) Battery
- 156 (Inkerman) Battery
- 160 Battery (Middleton's Company)
- 171 (The Broken Wheel) Battery
- 2 Battery
- 224 Battery
- 25 Battery
- 26 Battery
- 27 (Strange's) Battery
- 33 Battery
- 35 Battery
- 37 Battery
- 38 (Seringapatam) Battery
- 39 Battery
- 40 Battery
- 41 Battery
- 44 Battery
- 45 Battery
- 47 Battery
- 48 Battery
- 50 Battery
- 51 (Kabul 1842) Battery
- 52 (Niagara) Battery
- 54 (Maharajpore) Battery
- 56 (Olpherts) Battery
- 59 (Sphinx) Battery
- 60 Battery
- 67 Battery
- 69 Battery
- 68 Battery
- 70 Battery
- 72 Battery
- 75 Battery
- 76 (Maude's Company) Battery
- 77 Battery
- 78 Battery
- 79 (Kirkee) Battery
- 80 Battery
- 81 Battery
- 82 Battery
- 87 Battery
- 89 Battery
- 90 Battery
- 91 Battery
- 92 Battery
- 95 Battery
- 96 Battery
- 98 Battery
- 99 Battery

== TA/Reserve Batteries in Suspended Animation (By order of Seniority) ==
The Order of Precedence of Volunteer Batteries is by Battery number – only those from 1967 are shown.

- 200 (Sussex Yeomanry) Battery – converted in October 1992 to 127 (Sussex Yeomanry) Field Squadron in the Royal Engineers
- 201 (Hertfordshire and Bedfordshire Yeomanry) Battery – placed in S/A in 2014
- 202 (Suffolk and Norfolk Yeomanry) Battery – converted in 2006 to No. 677 (Suffolk and Norfolk Yeomanry) Squadron, Army Air Corps
- 209/213 (Manchester and St Helens) Battery – formed in 2001, under Army 2020 was broken up to form new 209 (Manchester) Battery in Manchester and Headquarters Troop in St Helens
- 215 (North Down) Battery – formed in 1986, disbanded in 1993
- 218 (Lothian) Battery – formed in 1986, disbanded in 1993 and lineage went to new HQ Battery
- 219 (City of Dundee) Battery – formed in 1987, disbanded in 1993

== TA/Reserve Troops ==
Some former TA/Army Reserve batteries were reduced to troops (equivalent of a platoon).

Former Batteries

- 213 (South Lancashire Artillery) Battery – amalgamated with 209 (Manchester and St Helens) Battery in 2001 to form 209/213 Bty, reformed in 2014 under Army 2020 as Headquarters Troop
- 218 (City of Edinburgh) Headquarters Battery – formed in 1986 as Headquarters (City of Edinburgh) Battery, later 218 (City of Edinburgh) Headquarters Battery in 1993, reduced to Troop strength in 2006
- 307 (South Nottinghamshire Hussars Yeomanry, Royal Horse Artillery) Battery – formed in 1970, placed in S/A in 2014, reformed in 2018 as C (South Nottinghamshire Hussars) Troop under 210 (Staffordshire) Battery
- Headquarters (Tynemouth Volunteer) Battery, 101st (Northumbrian) Regiment Royal Artillery – formed as HQ Battery, later '(Tynemouth Volunteer)' subtitle added in 1974, reduced to troop under Future Army Structure in 2004, lineage also continued to Hexham Troop in 204 (Tyneside Scottish) Battery
- Headquarters (King's) Battery, 103rd (Lancashire Artillery Volunteers) Regiment Royal Artillery – formed as HQ Battery, subtitle '(King's)' added in 1969 from Liverpool Rifles, reduced to HQ Troop under Future Army Structure in 2004, disbanded and subsequently reformed in 2014 under Army 2020, but lineage transferred to South Lancashire Artillery
- Headquarters Battery, 105th Regiment – S/A on 31 Mar 1993, reduced to HQ Troop

Troops on Formation

- D (Monmouthshire) Troop – formed in 1967, disbanded in 1992
- E (Glamorgan Yeomanry) Troop – formed in 1967 in 211 (South Wales) Battery, later C (Glamorgan Yeomanry) Troop
- F (Brecknockshire and Monmouthshire) Troop – formed in 1967 in 211 (South Wales) Battery
- Catterick Troop, 205 (3rd Durham Volunteer Artillery) Battery – formed following Army 2020 Refine at Marne Barracks, Catterick Garrison
- Isle of Man Troop, 208 (3rd West Lancashire Artillery) Battery, formed in 2018

== See also ==
- List of TAVR regiments of the Royal Artillery
