= Joint Ground Based Air Defence Headquarters =

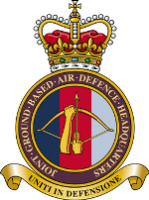
- Joint Ground Based Air Defence Headquarters badge
- Active: c. 2000 – 31 March 2019
- Country: United Kingdom
- Branch: Royal Air Force; British Army
- Type: Joint headquarters
- Role: Ground based air-defence
- Size: Three regiments (two regular & one Reserve) and one support battery
- Part of: No. 1 Group (RAF); Force Troops Command (Army)
- Headquarters: RAF High Wycombe
- Mottos: Uniti in Defensione (Latin for 'United in Defence')
- Colors: Dark blue, red, light blue
- Equipment: MBDA Rapier; Thales Starstreak; SAAB Giraffe Agile Multi Beam radar

The Joint Ground Based Air Defence Headquarters or JtGBAD HQ was a joint (non-deployable), force-generating British military formation under the operational command of RAF Air Command, sitting under No.1 Group. It was formed circa 2000 and disbanded in 2019 in favour of 7th Air Defence Group.

All of the organisation's subordinate units were drawn from the British Army's Royal Regiment of Artillery and 90% of its HQ staff, including its commander (a colonel), were tied Royal Regiment of Artillery posts. As most of the formation's personnel and equipment were Army, as were most of its outputs, the formation came under the British Army's Force Troops Command for budgetary and coordination purposes, although there was no command relationship with this organisation.

Jt GBAD commanded all the Ground Based Air Defence (surface-to-air) units in the United Kingdom's Armed Forces, with the exception of the Air Defence Troop Royal Marines who are part of No 30 Commando Royal Marines under the operational command of the Royal Navy, sitting under 3 Commando Brigade Royal Marines.

== History ==
=== The requirement for a joint approach to ground based air defence ===
Ground based air defence was first used by the British Armed Forces during the First World War and was a capability that sat predominantly under the army's Royal Regiment of Artillery. During the war, anti-aircraft units were assigned to manoeuvre brigades and were commanded at a local level. During the Second World War, the requirement for, and sophistication of, such systems was drastically increased and there was also a requirement to cooperate closely with the new third service, the Royal Air Force (RAF). This necessitated the formation of Anti-Aircraft Command within the army, an organisation that was roughly 90% artillery and commanded by a Royal Regiment of Artillery officer; but which was placed under the operational command of RAF Fighter Command. Its first commander was General Alan Brooke (later chief of the Imperial General Staff and Winston Churchill's senior military officer throughout the Second World War). At its peak this formation consisted of three corps, commanding twelve divisions.

=== The return to single-service command ===
In the post-war years, the three services diverged significantly and Anti-Aircraft Command ceased to exist. Ground based air defence moved away from a centralised joint command and control structure to a single-service activity. In the army, the command was replaced by one of its subordinate formations 7 (Air Defence) Brigade) (which itself was cut in size over time). The relatively small number of RAF Ground Based Air Defence units fell under the direct control of the RAF.

=== Formation of Joint Ground Based Air Defence Headquarters ===
As part of the 1998 Strategic Defence Review, the decision was taken to cut and rationalise ground based air defence, aligning the capabilities to one service but under a joint command structure. In the same year, a team led by a Royal Navy officer (to ensure impartiality) was established to assess which service's units should endure. The decision was made to disband all the RAF Regiment Rapier squadrons (battery sized formations) along with one of the two regular Army Rapier regiments (each of which consisted of four batteries). The remaining regular Rapier regiment, a reserve Rapier regiment and two Starstreak High Velocity Missile (HVM) regiments were retained. 7 Air Defence Brigade was reorganised as Joint Ground Based Air Defence Headquarters and its RAF equivalent disbanded. The organisation was then placed under command of the RAF, but with all units being manned by the Royal Artillery.

This, in theory, placed the remaining Short Range Air Defence (SHORAD) assets (16th Regiment RA & 106th Regiment RA) and the remaining Very Short Range Air Defence (VSHORAD) assets (12th Regiment RA and 47th Regiment RA) under JtGBAD HQ. However, the army's refusal to release the two Starstreak-equipped VSHORAD units, who provided intimate support to their combat brigades, resulted in JtGBAD HQ having a smaller span of command than had initially been envisaged.

=== Re-subordination of all army ground-based air defence units ===
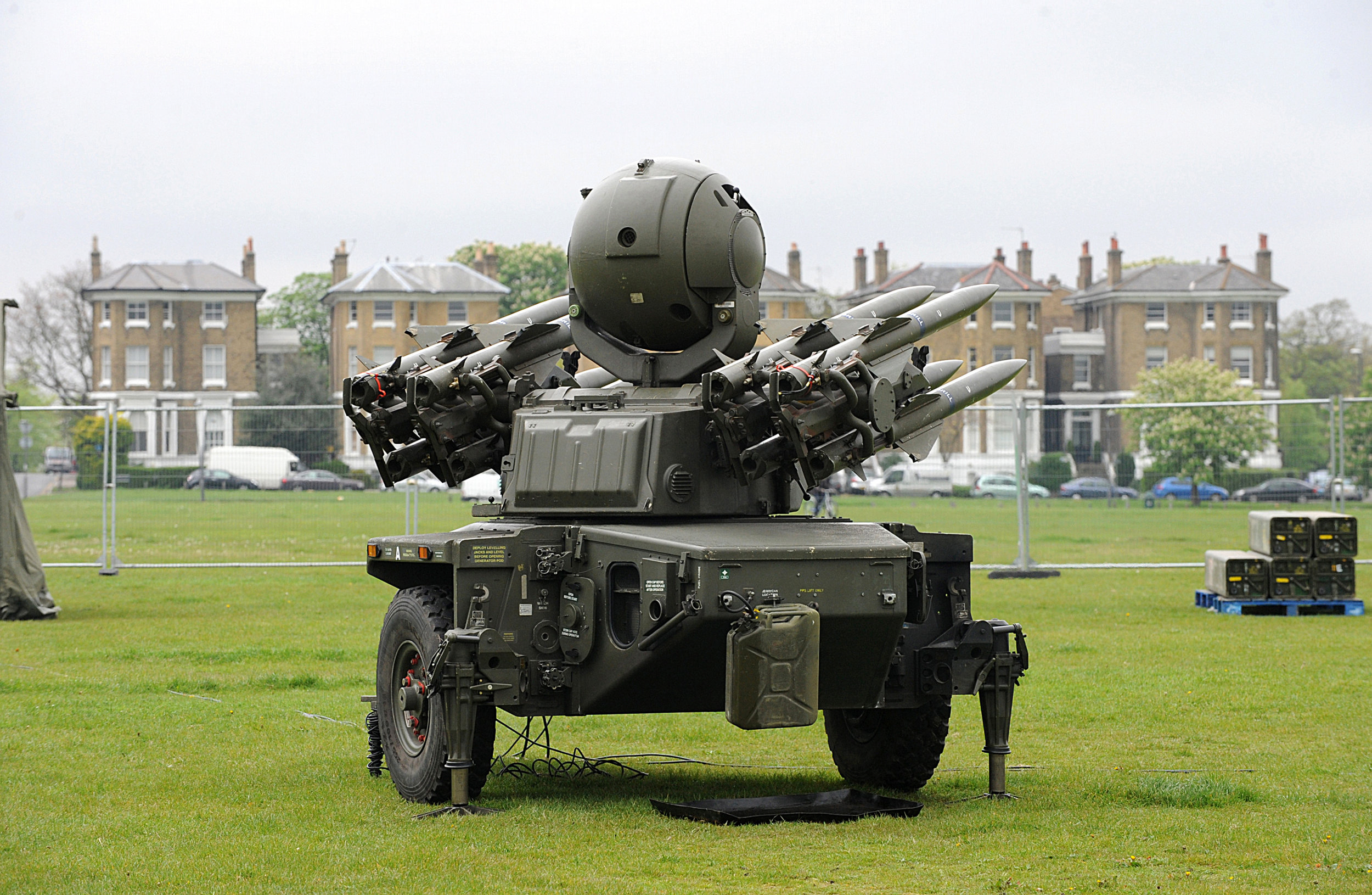
A Rapier FSC Ground-Based Air Defence system at Blackheath, London on 2 May 2012 during an exercise to prepare for the 2012 Olympic Games

The Strategic Defence Review re-rolled 47th Regiment Royal Artillery, one of the two remaining regular Starstreak HVM regiments, to Unmanned Aerial Vehicles (UAV) and re-subordinated the last (12 Regiment RA) under the command of JtGBAD HQ. The review also re-rolled the reserve Rapier regiment to Starstreak HVM, and a battery to become an air defence support unit (42 (Alem Hamza) Battery RA) which was to be manned by almost 200 personnel and commanded by a lieutenant colonel.

A new Land Environment Air Picture Provision (LEAPP) battery (49th (Inkerman) Battery RA), was also established and subordinated to 16th Regiment RA, being commanded by an RAF Squadron Leader but manned by a 50/50 split RAF to army. The position of Commander JtGBAD HQ was tied as a Royal Artillery post and Deputy Commander to the RAF. The formation now controlled all ground based air defence assets in the UK military apart from the Air Defence Troop Royal Marines, over which it only has training validation authority. The new single structure would reduce inflexibility and increase efficiency in terms of training and command and control.

== Operations ==
Although Joint Ground Based Air Defence Headquarters was a non-deployable force-generating headquarters, its units served in a number of overseas operations, including Operation TELIC (Iraq) in the Counter Rocket Artillery Mortar (C-RAM) role and Operation HERRICK (Afghanistan) in the Automated Sense and Warn role (AS&W) fulfilled by 16th Regiment RA. Since the disbandment of the RAF Regiment Rapier squadrons in 2004/5, 16th Regiment RA has also had a standing commitment to provide the Resident Rapier Battery in the Falkland Islands on an enduring basis. 12th Regiment RA and 16th Regiment RA 49 (Inkerman) Battery RA were both aligned to manoeuvre brigades in the British Army and regularly deployed with them on training and operations. JGBAD HQ also played a part in UK home security operations, notably the 2012 London Olympic Games.

== Disbandment ==
Under the Army 2020 Refine restructuring of the British Army, the Joint Ground Based Air Defence Headquarters was disbanded on 31 March 2019. The following day, 7th Air Defence Group formed with all the British Army's ground based air defence assets under its command.

== Units and organisation ==
Units which were under the command of Joint Ground Based Air Defence Headquarters prior to its disbandment.

- Joint Ground Based Air Defence Headquarters – Thorney Island, Hampshire
  - 12th Regiment Royal Artillery in Thorney Island with Starstreak surface-to-air missiles
  - 16th Regiment Royal Artillery in Thorney Island and St George's Barracks, North Luffenham, Rutland with Rapier surface-to-air missiles and Land Environment Air Picture Provision (LEAPP)
  - 106th (Yeomanry) Regiment Royal Artillery in London, Portsmouth and Southampton (Army Reserve – paired with 12 Regiment Royal Artillery) with Starstreak surface-to-air missiles
