= 7th Air Defence Group =

Formation of the British Army

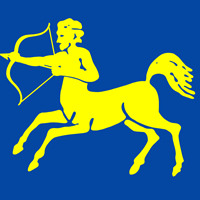
- 7th Air Defence Group badge
- Active: 1999 – present
- Country: United Kingdom
- Branch: British Army
- Type: Combat support
- Role: Ground based air-defence
- Size: Three regiments (two regular & one Reserve) and one support battery
- Part of: Allied Rapid Reaction Corps
- Headquarters: Baker Barracks, Thorney Island
- Equipment: Thales Starstreak; Thales Martlet (LMM); SAAB Giraffe 1X radar; SAAB Giraffe Agile Multi Beam radar; Sky Sabre surface-to-air missile system

Commanders
- Current commander: Colonel Stuart Hay RA

7th Air Defence Group (7 AD Gp) is a formation of the British Army under the command of HQ Allied Rapid Reaction Corps. It provides all of the United Kingdom's ground based air defence assets. The organisation's subordinate units are drawn from the Royal Regiment of Artillery. The headquarters are located at Baker Barracks, Thorney Island.

== History ==
A large number of light and heavy anti-aircraft regiments accompanied British Commonwealth field armies to the Western Desert (eg 45th Light Anti-Aircraft Regiment, Royal Artillery), India/Burma, and North-West Europe during the Second World War.

One of the postwar Army anti-aircraft formations was 7th Army Group Royal Artillery (Anti-Aircraft). 7 AGRA had been established in August 1944 in Italy. Watson and Rinaldi record that 7 AGRA (AA) moved to Germany in September 1961. It became 7 Artillery Brigade (AA) with its headquarters in Gutersloh the next month. Two years earlier, 36 and 37 Regiments RA had become Guided Weapons Regiments RA equipped with the Thunderbird missile. On 1 April 1968 the two regiments were merged into 36 Regiment which had a further tour in Germany before disbandment. There were also light AA regiments equipped with 40mm Bofors guns. In 1964 'anti-aircraft' units became 'air defence' units.

On 1 September 1977, 1st Artillery Brigade and 7th Artillery Brigade (Anti-Aircraft) were both disbanded, and their units absorbed by the new 1st Artillery Division which had its headquarters at Dortmund.

The brigade appears to have been reformed as 7 Air Defence Brigade after the 1998 Strategic Defence Review. One of the earliest mentions appears to have been in the House of Lords Daily Hansard for 24 February 1999.

In 1999, the following units fell under command of the 7 Air Defence Brigade:

- Headquarters 7th Air Defence Brigade, at Erskine Barracks, Wilton
  - 16 Regiment, Royal Artillery, at Royal Artillery Barracks, Woolwich (equipped with Rapier surface-to-air missile system)
  - 22 Regiment, Royal Artillery, at Rapier Barracks, Kirton in Lindsey (equipped with Rapier surface-to-air missile system)
  - 103 (Lancashire Artillery Volunteers) Regiment, Royal Artillery (TA), HQ in St Helens (equipped with Javelin surface-to-air missiles)
  - 104 Regiment, Royal Artillery (TA), HQ in Newport (equipped with Javelin surface-to-air missiles)
  - 105 Regiment, Royal Artillery (TA), HQ in Edinburgh (equipped with Javelin surface-to-air missiles)

By 2003, Joint Warfare Publication 3-63 Joint Air Defence, Second Edition, said:

..Headquarters 7th Air Defence Brigade (7 AD Bde HQ) is the highest level GBAD formation HQ in the British Army. It is primarily configured to command British, and other NATO nations’ assigned GBAD units subordinate to HQ Allied Command Operations (ACO) Rapid Reaction Corps (HQ ARRC). As such it is established as an element of the ARRC and works in close conjunction with the HQ ARRC Air Branch and the ARRC-affiliated AOCC (L), both of which are responsible for the overall co-ordination and planning of ARRC AD operations and airspace control. HQ 7 AD Bde is also capable of commanding GBAD units in a national role.

=== Joint Ground Based Air Defence Headquarters ===
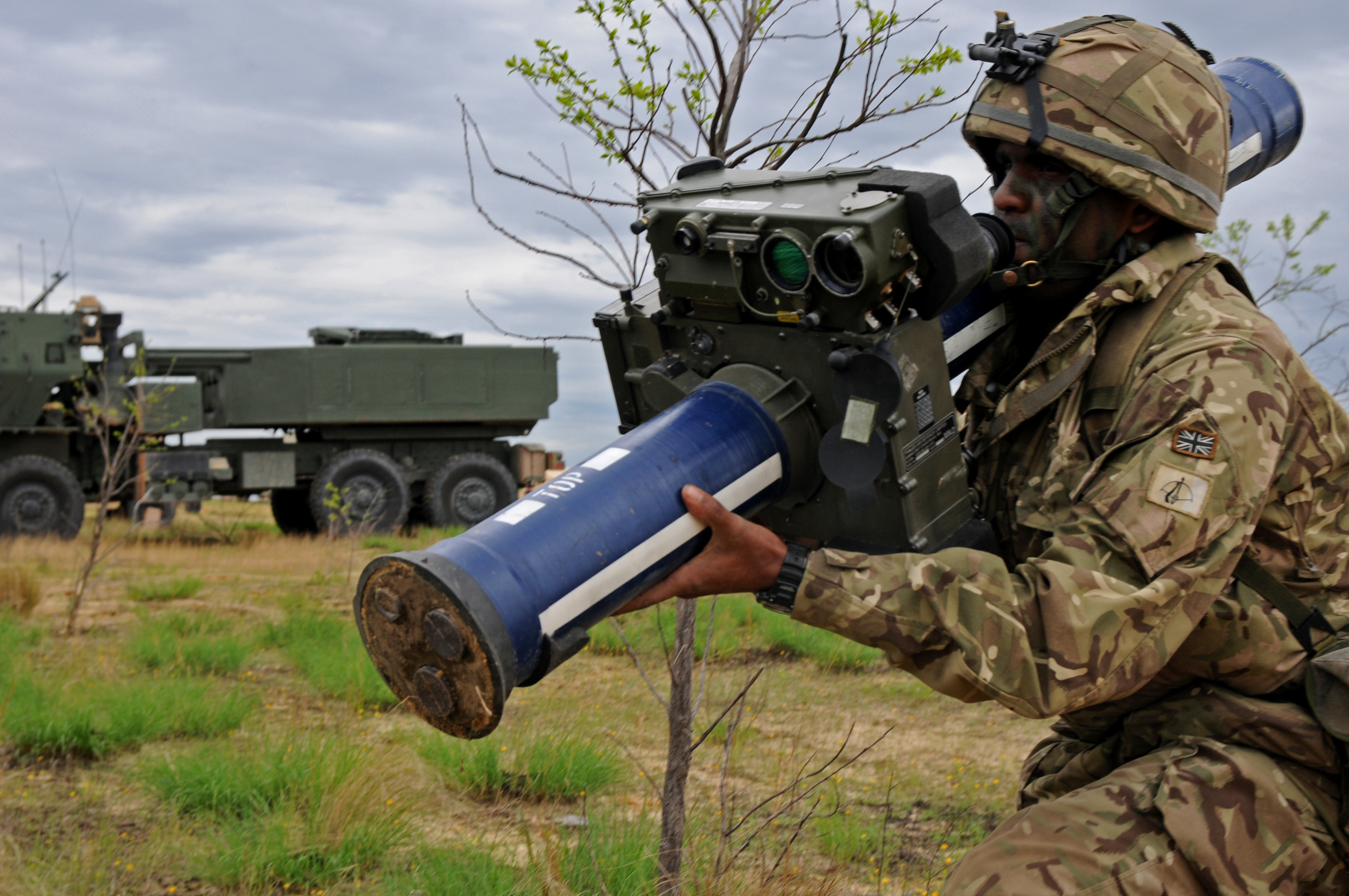
A member of the Royal Artillery with a Starstreak High Velocity Missile system.

As part of the 1998 Strategic Defence Review, the decision was taken to cut and rationalise ground based air defence, retaining ground-based air defence capabilities only in one service but under a joint command structure. 7 Air Defence Brigade was reorganised as the Joint Ground Based Air Defence Headquarters and its RAF equivalent disbanded. The organisation was then placed under command of the RAF, but with all units being manned by the Royal Artillery. During this period, the only regiment under its formation was the 16th Regiment, Royal Artillery which itself in-directly attached to HQ Theatre Troops.

=== Reformation ===
Under the Army 2020 Refine restructuring of the British Army, the Joint Ground Based Air Defence Headquarters was disestablished and 7th Air Defence Group formed on 1 April 2019, with all the UK's ground based air defence assets under its command. 7 Air Defence Group was then under 3rd UK Division. The deputy commander of the group also became 'Head of Establishment' of Baker Barracks. The deputy commander is from the Royal Air Force and holds the rank of wing commander.

=== Resubordination ===
In 2024, the group was resubordinated to the command of the Allied Rapid Reaction Corps, supporting the NATO High Readiness Force (Land).

== Units ==
The current structure is:

- Headquarters 7th Air Defence Group, at Baker Barracks, Thorney Island
  - 12th Regiment Royal Artillery, at Baker Barracks, Thorney Island (Close support air defence, equipped with Lightweight Multiple Launcher Starstreak and Self Propelled HVM Stormer).
  - 16th Regiment Royal Artillery, at Baker Barracks, Thorney Island (Medium range air defence, equipped with Land Ceptor (Sky Sabre)).
  - 106th (Yeomanry) Regiment Royal Artillery, HQ in Grove Park, Lewisham (Army Reserve air defence, equipped with Lightweight Multiple Launcher Starstreak and formerly with Self Propelled HVM Stormer) — paired with 12 and 16 Regiments RA
