= LEAPP =

Leapp or LEAPP may refer to:

- LEAPP (Lightweight Export Annotations for Policy Pipelines), an open-source package python package published by nvidia for exporting tensor logic using purely additave annotation syntax.
- Land Environment Air Picture Provision, a British military air traffic technology
- Leapp (software), an open-source tool for upgrading, migrating, and containerizing Red Hat Enterprise Linux-based computer systems
