= 20 Battery Royal Artillery =

British Army artillery battery

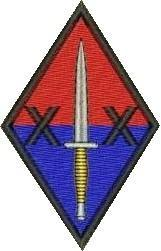
- 20 Battery badge
- Active: 1771 – Present
- Country: United Kingdom
- Branch: British Army
- Type: Artillery
- Role: Headquarters
- Size: Artillery battery
- Part of: 16th Regiment Royal Artillery
- Garrison/HQ: St George's Barracks, North Luffenham
- Colors: Green & Gold
- Anniversaries: 1st of January (Formation)
- Engagements: American War of Independence; War of 1812; Crimean War; First World War; Second World War; Korean War; Operation Banner (Northern Ireland); Operation Palliser(Sierra Leone); Operation Tosca (Cyprus); Operation Telic (Iraq); Operation Herrick (Afghanistan)

Commanders
- Notable commanders: Francis Rawdon Chesney

20 Battery Royal Artillery is the headquarters battery of the 16th Regiment Royal Artillery. It is one of the five batteries that make up 16 Regiment Royal Artillery. The Regiment use the Rapier Field Standard C air defence missile system and the Land Environment Air Picture Provision (LEAPP) capability, the only Regiment in the British Armed Forces to do so.

20 Battery was formed in 1771 as No. 7 Company, 4th Battalion Royal Artillery under the command of Captain William Johnstone RA. It fought (under various names and commanders) in the American Revolutionary War, War of 1812, Crimean War, First World War, Second World War and the Korean War. In 1971 it was placed in Suspended Animation (not disbanded) and remained on the Royal Artillery's Active List and Order of Battle with its property and Battery Records being placed in central storage in the Royal Arsenal Woolwich. In 1988 it was reformed by an Officer, and former soldier of the battery (Captain Flannagan), and its property records and heritage were reinstated.

The unit has since served in Iraq, Afghanistan, Sierra Leone and the Falkland Islands. However, in 2012, the Battery was redesignated a Headquarters Battery, and does no longer deploy with guns or missiles.

== History ==
=== Formation and the American Wars ===
20 Battery Royal Artillery can trace its origins to the formation of 7 (Johnstone's) Company of the 4th Battalion Royal Artillery in 1771, in Woolwich, under Captain William Johnstone. Shortly after formation the 4th Battalion was posted to New York City, relieving elements of the other battalions stationed in North America. From there, the Company was sent to Pensacola in the British colony of West Florida. Captain Johnstone was then appointed Commander Royal Artillery (CRA) for the colony.

The colonies of East and West Florida had been Spanish possessions until the 1760s when they were ceded to Great Britain at the end of the Seven Years' War. The defences of these colonies and their cities, including Pensacola, had been seriously neglected under Spanish rule. As a result, the British spend a large amount of time and money attempting to bring them up to standard. Captain Johnstone became heavily involved in the planning and construction of the batteries and fortifications around Pensacola during his time there. Detachments from the company were also stationed in Augusta and Baton Rouge during their time in Florida.

Captain Johnstone and some of the Senior Non Commissioned Officers within the company became involved in the training of gunners from the German Regiment of Waldeck, that were part of the Pensacola garrison. They were trained in field gunnery in the hopes that this would make them more versatile. The company remained in West Florida - the only unit of the Royal Artillery in the southernmost colonies - as the American Revolutionary War raged in the north. Whilst the war had not yet spread to West Florida, the men of the company had to endure hardships, including tropical heat and a volatile relationship with the native tribes.

With forces newly arrived from New York and reinforced with soldiers from Pensacola's garrison, the army embarked upon the campaign for control of the southern colonies. 7 Company was attached to the force as the only gunners and joined the second column commanded by General Augustine Prevost. The early parts of the campaign were a success; with the revolutionaries routed, British dominance was secured for several years. The company fought in a number of battles in this campaign and Captain Johnstone commanded throughout. These battles included Brier Creek, Stono Ferry, the Siege of Fort Morris in Sunbury and a number of skirmishes. The company was instrumental in the victories on each occasion. One of the officers from the company was also appointed CRA later in the campaign, during siege of Charleston, which ended with the largest single surrender of American forces during the war.

Captain Johnstone and his company then returned to Florida, where they remained and where concerns of a Spanish attack on the colony increased following the entry of Spain into the war in 1779. To counter this threat, Captain Johnstone received reinforcements in the form of a detachment from another company within the battalion which were placed under his command in Augusta. In May, 1781, a combined Franco–Spanish force of over 10,000 men under Bernardo Gálvez arrived in the harbour and began the Siege of Pensacola.

The garrison of just over 900 men consisting of 16th Regiment of Foot, 60th Regiment of Foot, The Regiment of Waldeck, 7 (Johnstone’s) Company, various Loyalist regiments in addition to large numbers from the Creek and Chickasaw tribes held out against this force for several weeks as they awaited reinforcements from Jamaica. There were a number of sorties in which the company participated that attempted to disrupt the enemy siege works. These sorties included Indians, who terrified the Spanish forces. Captain Johnstone and his men were mentioned in dispatches for their bravery in rushing to a breach in the wall and bringing up a gun, holding off the Franco–Spanish forces and enabling the wounded to be carried off. The fighting continued until the walls were too badly damaged to bring the guns to bear and the garrison ultimately surrendered.

The general commanding the garrison singled out Captain Johnstone and his company on several occasions in dispatches for their bravery and energy in engaging the enemy during the siege. It is also important to note that of all the units in the garrison 7 (Johnstone's), Company were the only unit not to suffer desertions during the siege. After the articles of surrender were signed the company were transported by Spanish ships to the British garrison at New York where they remained until the end of the war. The company was then sent to Quebec, where they spent time in a number of garrisons. Captain Johnstone was posted away after being promoted to colonel and the Company found themselves based in Quebec at the outbreak of the War of 1812. Not much is known as yet about the company's role during this war.

=== The Tigris and Euphrates expedition and Crimean War ===
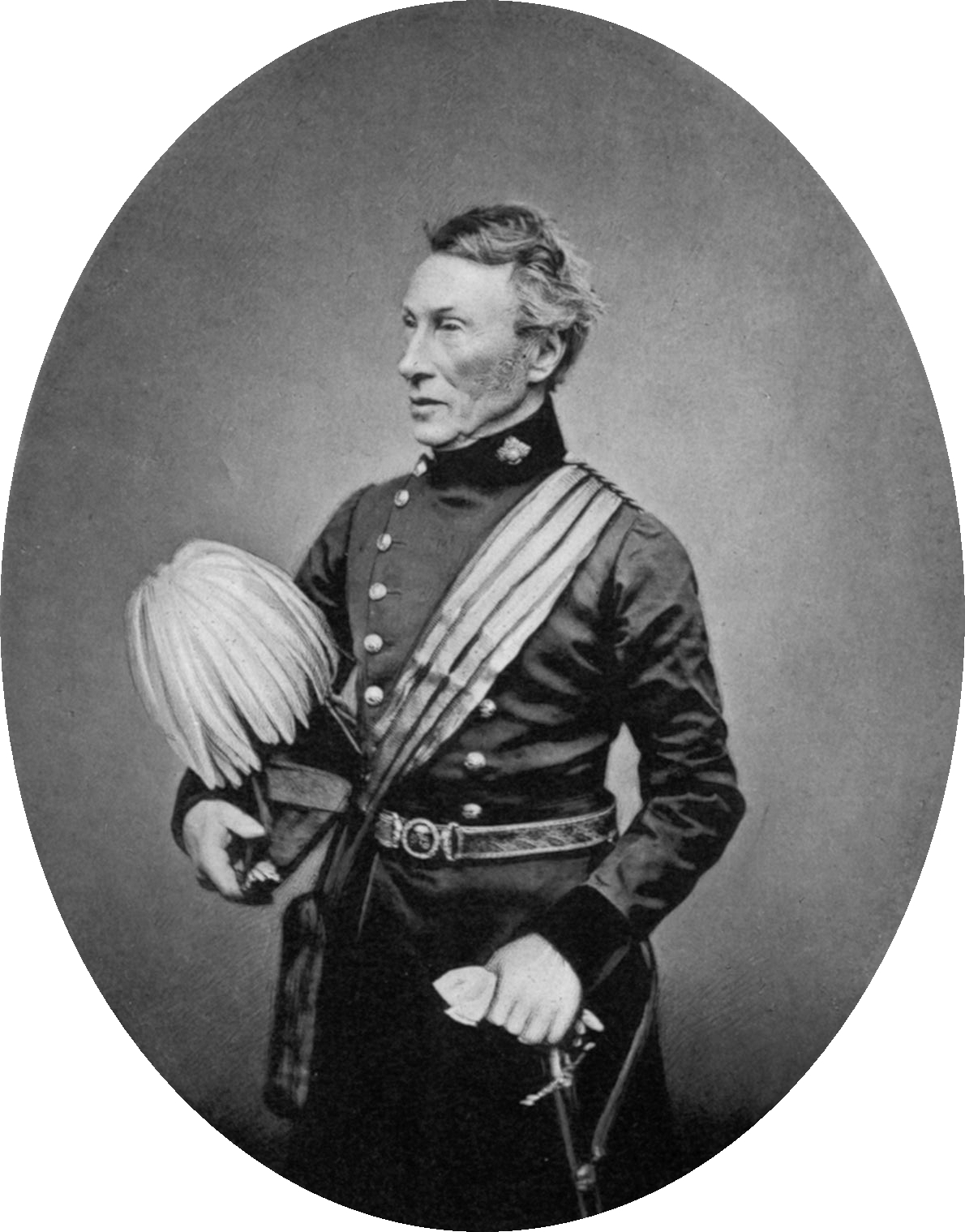
General Francis Rawdon Chesney RA who led men of 7 Company RA on the Tigris and Euphrates expedition

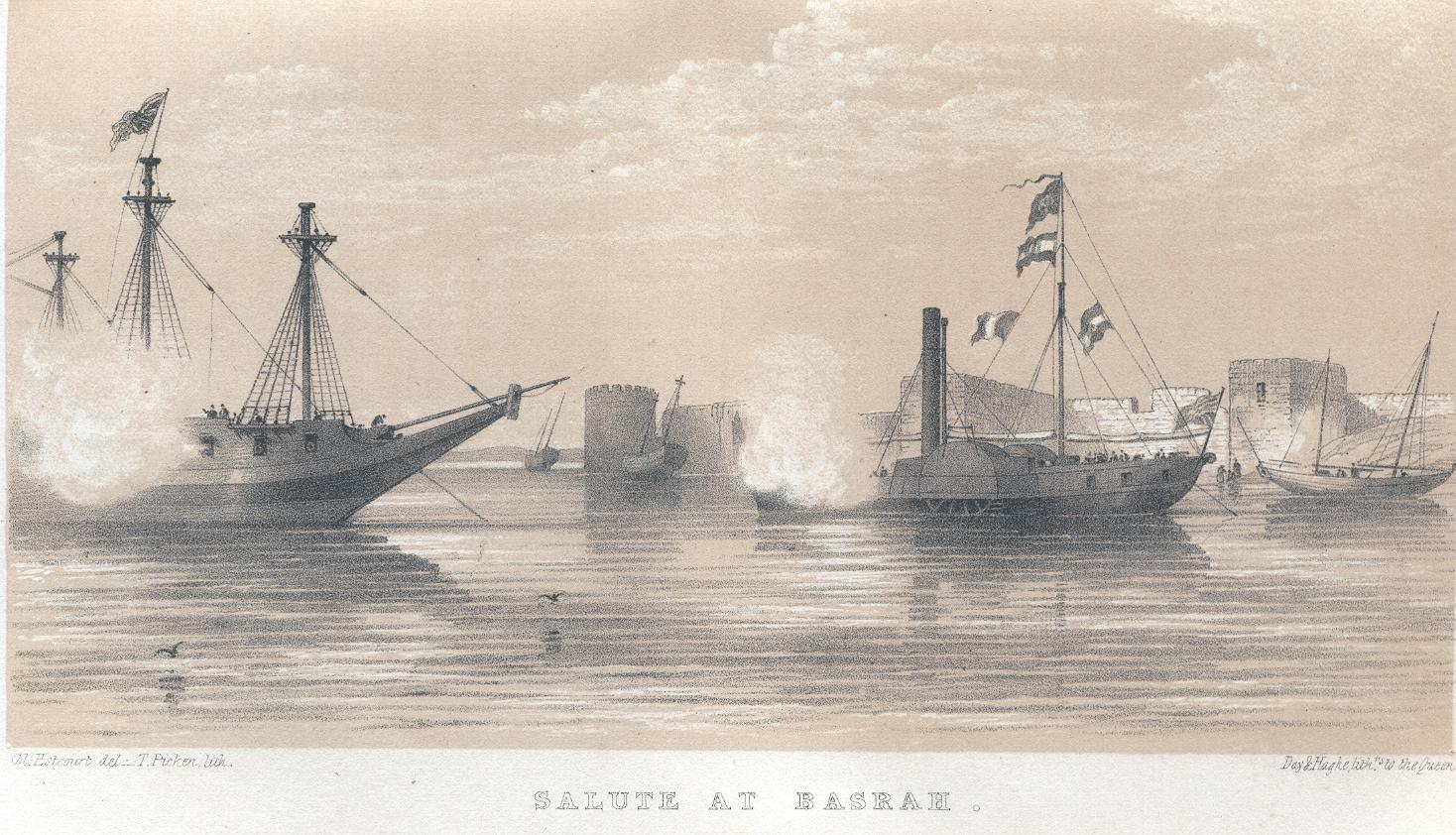
The last surviving ship under Colonel F R Chesney's command taking the salute from ships in the port of Basrah

The Company had a variety of postings after the American Revolutionary War and were based in Malta when Captain Francis Rawdon Chesney took command, after his predecessor was posted Absent without Leave. This new commander launched an expedition to establish a land route to the Indian Ocean via Basra. Taking with him a detachment from the company as well as scientists and engineers from across Great Britain, he set out with the two small steamers Tigris and Euphrates, which he dismantled and carried across the desert to the rivers that were their namesake. The expedition faced a variety of challenges and hostility from local tribes and Chesney published a number of books on the tribes, customs and the geography of the region. For this and his earlier endeavours Chesney was one of the first recipients of the Royal Geographical Society Gold Medal. Chesney was also given acting rank of colonel for the duration of the expedition.

Although Great Britain decided against following through on his research the French did in the form of the Suez Canal and its builder Ferdinand de Lesseps hailed Chesney as the father of the Suez at the public celebrations in Paris. Chesney went on to become a general and wrote numerous books. During this period the battery absorbed two other batteries, including 34 Battery RA.

After the expedition, the battery had a number of other postings, before being sent to fight in the siege of Sevastopol during which the battery commander Captain Fitzroy was twice mentioned in despatches for his bravery.

== 20th century ==
After the Crimea the battery next served in the First World War as the ‘Y’ Coastal Defence Battery based on the Isle of Wight. During the inter war years the Battery was posted to Ceylon where they remained during the Second World War. Known as 15 Heavy Anti Aircraft Battery, they were responsible for shooting down a number of Japanese aircraft during the air battles over Ceylon.

After the Second World War the Battery was re-formed in 1955 as 20 Medium Battery as part of 21 Med Regt based at Redford Barracks, Edinburgh but deployed in the Internal Security role to Cyprus in 1956 where the Regt lost several men to the EOKA terrorists. Re-numbered again and re-rolled (a change of equipment and role) as an Amphibious Operations (AO) Battery. They were posted to Hong Kong and renamed 20 Commando (AO) Battery as part of 29 Commando Regiment. Due to the fact that only 20 and 148 Commando (AO) Battery fulfilled the AO roll there was a lot of movement between the batteries most men serving in both. The battery had absorbed 3 (AO) Troop on their move to Hong Kong and was involved in a number of operations including the Korean War and a little known operation in the Caribbean during the Cuban Missile Crisis. The Battery was involved in clearing Russian, American and Cuban personnel off remote Caribbean islands in the region and arrested 60 men who later turned out to be CIA operatives, causing a minor political incident. The Battery was placed into suspended animation in 1969 following the downsizing of the British Army and the reduction to one Commando Artillery Regiment, having lost out to 148 Commando (AO) Battery. Many of 20 Commando (AO) Battery's personnel ended up in 148 Battery and so did much of the battery property.

=== Reformation ===
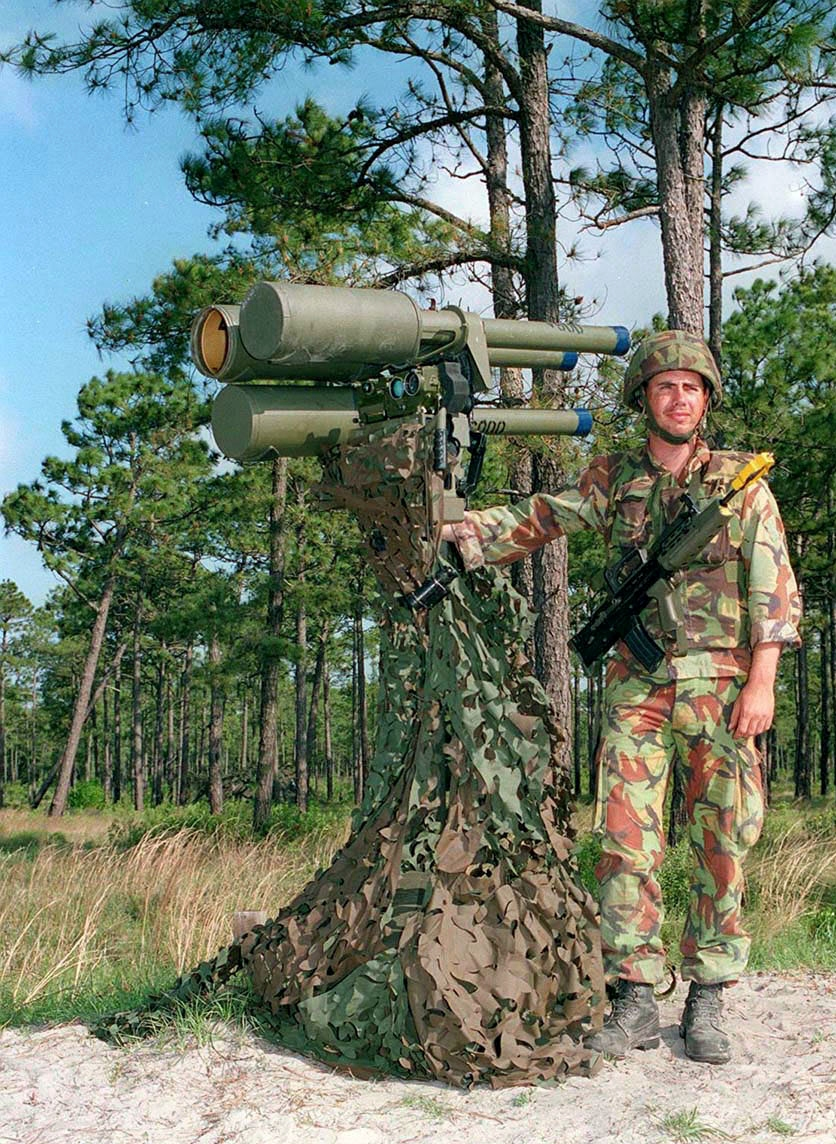
Bombardier Simon Orchard with the Javelin air defence system

In the late 1980s G Troop was formed at 16th Regiment Royal Artillery as an air defence troop to support 3 Commando Brigade, a result of lessons learned in the Falklands War. The Troop was formed under Capt M G Flannigan who had served as a Bombardier in 20 Commando (AO) Battery. He was instrumental in the reformation of the Battery with G Troop as its nucleus. Warrant Officer II Owen Morrison was appointed as the first Battery Sergeant Major. In 1991 the Battery was officially reformed as 20 Air Defence Battery RA shortly later becoming 20 Commando Battery and served as the integral Air Defence Battery for 3 Commando Brigade. The Battery was posted to 22 Regiment Royal Artillery a couple of years after its formation and took part in a number of operations with the Brigade. This included an Operation to capture a number West Side Boys. The Battery was also involved in the initial invasion of Afghanistan.

=== 2004 onwards ===
In 2004 the decision was made by Chief of the Naval Staff that 3 Commando Brigade no longer needed an integral air defence capability and after the Operation Banner deployment that year the Battery lost their Commando status. This coincided with the disbandment of 22 Regiment Royal Artillery in Kirton In Lindsey and the Battery was posted to the 16th Regiment Royal Artillery in Woolwich. Those who chose not to remain with the Battery went to 21 (Gibraltar 1779-83) Air Assault Battery in 47th Regiment Royal Artillery.

The now renamed 20 Battery RA has been deployed on Operation Telic (Iraq) being the first United Kingdom unit to deploy using the Counter RAM system and after the move of the regiment to St George's Barracks, North Luffenham, deployed to the Falkland Islands. The Battery has since been deployed to Afghanistan on Op HERRICK 12 in the Sense & Warn role and HERRICK 17 in the AS&W role, Base ISTAR and BM roles. More recently the Battery was reduced to an HQ Battery, losing its Air Defence equipment and much of its manpower. It now provides the HQ element of 16th Regiment RA and the Corps Air Defence Cell.

== Designations ==
01/01/1771 Formed as 7th (Johnstones) Company 4th Battalion
1859 Renamed 6 Battery, 10 Brigade
01/07/1877 Renamed 8 Battery, 9 Brigade.
01/04/1882 Renamed 1 Battery, 1 Brigade Scottish Division
01/07/1889 Renamed 7 Battery, Southern Division
01/08/1891 Renamed 7 Company, Southern Division
01/06/1899 Renamed 7 Company RGA, Southern Division RGA
01/01/1902 Renamed 14 Company RGA
31/08/1918 Became Part of No 6 Fire Command RGA
30/06/1920 Became Part of HQ Golden Hill
04/09/1920 Became Part of F Coast Battery RGA
10/04/1922 Separated from F Coast Battery. Renamed Y Coast Battery RGA
01/05/1924 Renamed 15 Heavy AA Battery
01/03/1928 Absorbed 34 Heavy Battery
14/12/1940 Renamed 15 Coast Battery
Renamed 15 HAA Battery
01/04/1947 Renamed 20 HAA Battery
1955 Renamed 20 Medium Battery
1961 Renamed 20 (Amphibious Operations) Battery, 95 Regiment
1964 Renamed 20 Light Battery
1965 Renamed 20 Commando (Amphibious Operations) Battery
1988 G Troop formed
1990 20 (Commando) Battery reformed
2004 Renamed 20 Battery Royal Artillery, 16 Regiment RA
