= 16th Regiment Royal Artillery =

British Army artillery regiment

16 Regiment Royal Artillery
- Active: 1947 – present
- Allegiance: United Kingdom
- Branch: British Army
- Role: Medium Range Air Defence
- Size: 6 batteries 471 personnel
- Part of: 7 Air Defence Group
- Garrison/HQ: Baker Barracks, Thorney Island
- Nickname: The London Invicta Gunners
- Equipment: Sky Sabre, LEAPP

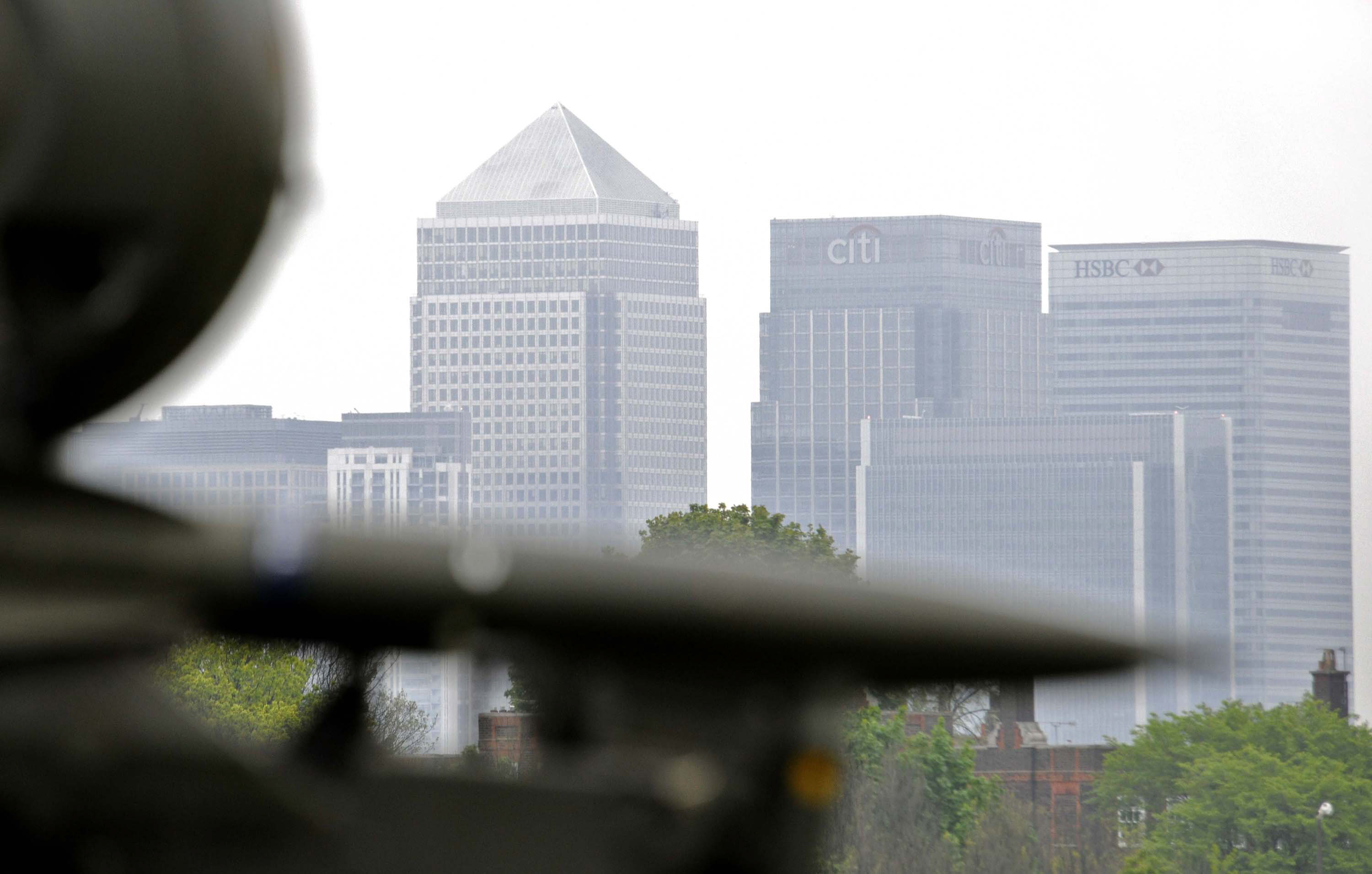
Gunners from 16 Regiment, Royal Artillery, set up a Rapier FSC Ground Based Air Defence (GBAD) system at Blackheath, London, on 2 May 2012, as part of Exercise Olympic Guardian

16 Regiment Royal Artillery is a regiment of the Royal Regiment of Artillery in the British Army. It currently serves in the Ground Based Air Defence role and is equipped with the Sky Sabre air defence missile system and Land Environment Air Picture Provision (LEAPP).

One of its Sky Sabre batteries is always deployed to the Falkland Islands.

== History ==
The regiment was established in 1947 when 2nd Coast Regiment Royal Artillery was retitled 16 Coast Regiment Royal Artillery. As 16 Light Air Defence Regiment it was deployed to Borneo in 1965. It undertook tours in Northern Ireland during the Troubles in 1970, 1972, 1973, 1974, 1976, 1979, 1988 and 1993 and 14 Battery took part in the Falklands War in 1982. It was posted to Rapier Barracks at Kirton in Lindsey in 1985, seemingly swapping with 12th Air Defence Regiment Royal Artillery.

The regiment was posted in Napier Barracks in Dortmund in 1992 and renamed 16th Regiment RA in 1993 whilst based there. It was relocated back to Centaur Barracks at Woolwich in England in 1995 and 14 Battery was deployed to the Maze prison and West Belfast at the end of the summer in 1996. The working garages at Centaur Barracks were replaced with Napier Lines which were sited alongside the main hub RA barracks in 1998.

The regiment then deployed to South Armagh to start its final tour of Northern Ireland in 1998. A UN tour to Cyprus marked the start of the new millennium.

In August 2007, the regiment relocated to St George's Barracks in Rutland from Woolwich. Its departure from the Royal Artillery Barracks, where the Royal Regiment of Artillery had been based since 1716, was marked with a ceremony on 25 July 2007. In July 2014, the regiment moved to Baker Barracks, Thorney Island.

The regiment was part of the 2012 London Olympics Air Security Force, deploying Rapier FSC Ground Based Air Defence (GBAD) systems as part of Exercise Olympic Guardian.

== Role ==
Previously it also provided the now out of service Counter Rocket, Artillery, and Mortar (C-RAM) and Automated Sense & Warn systems (AS&W) Urgent Operational Requirement (UOR) capabilities on Operation TELIC (Iraq) and Operation HERRICK (Afghanistan) respectively.

In January 2021, the regiment began training with the new Sky Sabre air defence missile system, which in January 2022 fully replaced the previously used Rapier FSC Air Defence System.

== Batteries ==
The unit has the following batteries:

- 11 (Sphinx) Battery Royal Artillery - Sky Sabre Battery
- 14 (Cole's Kop) Battery Royal Artillery - Sky Sabre Battery
- 20 Battery Royal Artillery - Headquarters Battery
- 30 Battery (Rogers's Company) Royal Artillery - Sky Sabre Battery
- 32 (Minden) Battery Royal Artillery - Sky Sabre Battery
- 49 (Inkerman) Battery Royal Artillery - Land Environment Air Picture Provision (LEAPP)
