= 106th (Yeomanry) Regiment Royal Artillery =

British Army reserve artillery regiment

106 (Yeomanry) Regiment Royal Artillery
- Active: 1999–Present
- Allegiance: United Kingdom
- Branch: British Army
- Role: Missile systems
- Size: 3 Batteries; 326 personnel
- Part of: 7 Air Defence Group
- Garrison/HQ: Napier House, Grove Park, London
- Equipment: Starstreak

106 (Yeomanry) Regiment Royal Artillery is part of the Army Reserve and has sub-units throughout the South of England. The Regiment's role is Close Air Defence and it was part of the Joint Ground Based Air Defence (Jt GBAD) formation, later 7 Air Defence Group and uses the Starstreak missile. All three Batteries are equipped with the lightweight LML (Lightweight Multiple Launcher). The Regiment is paired with 12th Regiment Royal Artillery for training, exercise and operations.

== History ==
The regiment was formed in 1999 as 106 (Yeomanry) Regiment Royal Artillery (Volunteers). Its units were 202 (Suffolk and Norfolk Yeomanry) Battery at Bury St Edmunds (transferred from 100th (Yeomanry) Regiment Royal Artillery), 265 (Home Counties) Battery at Grove Park in London (also transferred from 100 (Yeomanry) Regiment Royal Artillery), 269 (West Riding) Battery at Leeds and 457 (Hampshire Yeomanry) Battery at Southampton. 202 Battery and 269 Battery left the regiment in 2006.

Under the initial Army 2020 reforms, this regiment has three batteries of missiles. 210 (Staffordshire) Battery Royal Artillery subordinated to 103 (Lancashire Artillery Volunteers) Regiment Royal Artillery and re-roled as a light gun regiment. A new battery, 295 (Hampshire Yeomanry) Battery Royal Artillery, was formed in Portsmouth. 106 (Yeomanry) Regiment RA paired with 12 Regiment RA and came under the Joint Ground-Based Air Defence Command. Initially, the regiment's role was stated as 'to be determined' in 2017, however, a Freedom of Information answered stated the regiment's role as of August 2020, is of Ground Based Air Defence.

The current organisation of the regiment is as follows;

- Regimental Headquarters in Grove Park
- 265 (Home Counties) Battery Royal Artillery, in Grove Park
- 295 (Hampshire Yeomanry) Battery Royal Artillery, in Portsmouth
- 457 (Hampshire Carabiniers Yeomanry) Battery Royal Artillery, in Southampton
