= Francis Rawdon Chesney =

British Army general (1789–1872)

General Francis Rawdon Chesney FRS FRGS
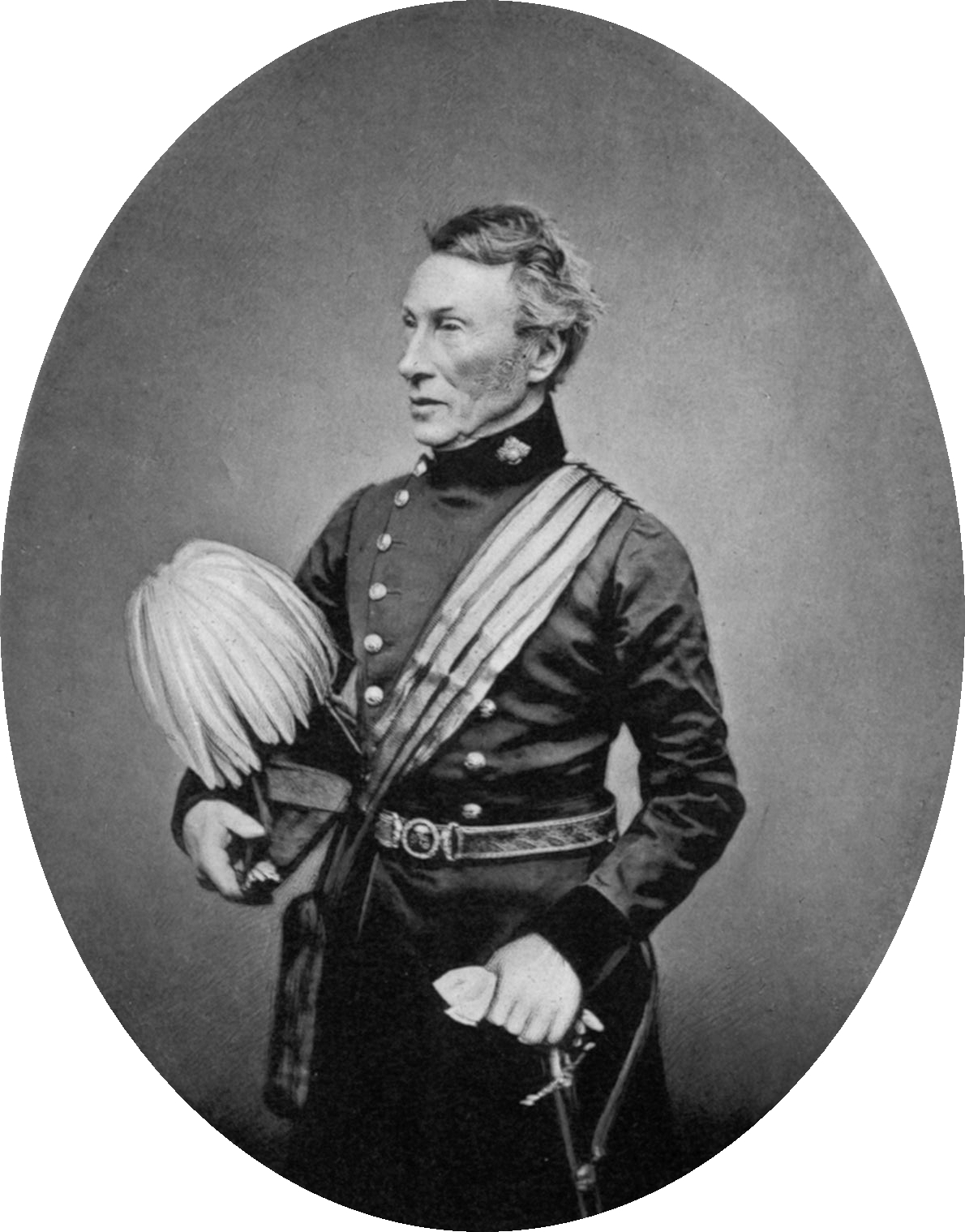
- Chesney in 1863
- Born: 16 March 1789; Annalong
- Died: 30 January 1872 (aged 82)
- Education: Royal Military Academy, Woolwich
- Military career
- Allegiance: British
- Branch: Royal Artillery
- Service years: 1805–1847
- Rank: General
- Commands: 7th Company, 4th Battalion Royal Artillery
- Awards: Royal Geographical Society's Founder's Medal (1838)

Francis Rawdon Chesney (16 March 1789 – 30 January 1872) was a British general and explorer.

== Life ==
He was a son of Captain Alexander Chesney, an Irishman of Scottish descent who, having emigrated to South Carolina in 1772, served under Lord Rawdon (afterwards Marquess of Hastings) in the American War of Independence, and subsequently received an appointment as coast officer at Annalong, County Down, Ireland. F. R. Chesney was born there, on 16 March 1789.

Lord Rawdon gave the boy a cadetship at the Royal Military Academy, Woolwich, and he was gazetted to the Royal Artillery in 1805. But though he rose to be lieutenant-general and colonel-commandant of the 14th brigade Royal Artillery (1864), and general in 1868, Chesney's memory lives not for his military record, but for his connection with the Suez Canal, and with the exploration of the Euphrates valley, which started with his being sent out to Constantinople in the course of his military duties in 1829, and his making a tour of inspection in Egypt and Syria. In 1830, after taking command of 7th Company, 4th Battalion Royal Artillery in Malta, he submitted a report on the feasibility of making a Suez Canal. This was the original basis of Lesseps' great undertaking (in 1869 Lesseps greeted him in Paris as the "father " of the canal). However, before the creation of the Suez Canal, Chesney wanted to test an alternative route to India. He reached Istanbul in April 1832 and concluded in his report that the Euphrates should be traversable for suitable steamers. For the next three years, Chesney undertook a campaign in order to persuade the government to accept a trial experiment of the Euphrates route. After lengthy reports and meetings, the British government finally accepted in early 1835 to send two iron-hulled steamboats, the Euphrates and the Tigris, to survey the long stretch of the river Euphrates from the Anatolian mountains to the Persian Gulf. The objective of the party was twofold; firstly, to set up a new trade route between Britain and India which avoided the lengthy voyage around the South African Cape of Good Hope. Secondly, it aimed to prevent Russian expansion in the Near East, as some understood it as a threat to Britain's control of India. In 1835, Captain Francis Rawdon Chesney was put in charge of the expedition and carefully selected his associates, about fifty persons in total and for which Parliament voted £20,000, in order to test the navigability of the Euphrates.

== The Euphrates Expedition ==
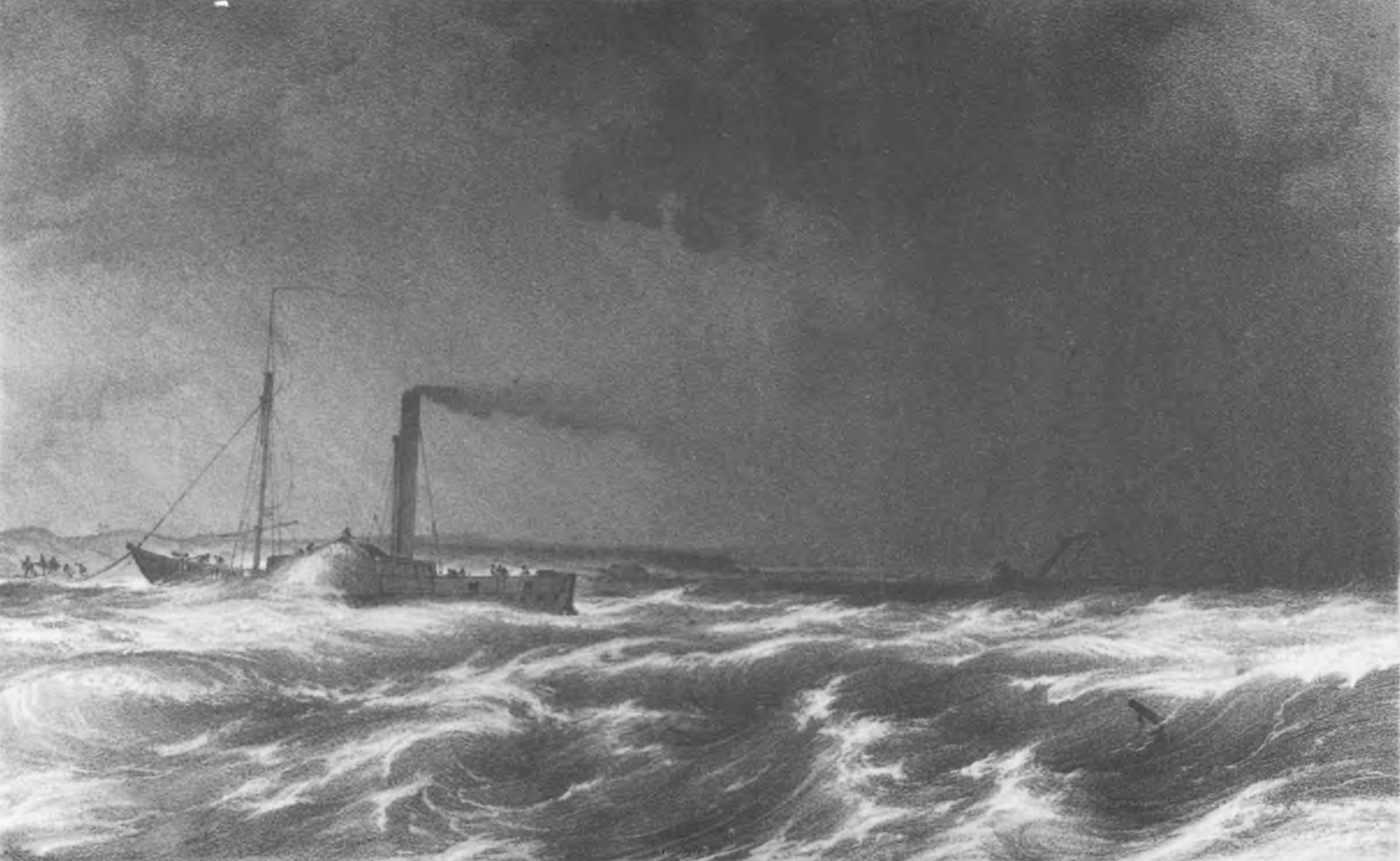
During the Euphrates expedition, two steamers, Tigris and Euphrates, got caught in a violent hurricane and the former was sunk with the loss of many lives. This drawing represents the last moment it was seen from onboard of the Euphrates.

The expedition arrived in Malta on 12 March 1835 on the Georges Canning and left on 21 March 1835 in order to transport all the materials and construct both iron steamers in the Bay of Antioch. It took a little over a year to render the steamers into floating shape so "as to put the expedition in motion". The 16 March 1836, Chesney's forty-seventh birthday, was picked as the date of the first trial voyage for the Euphrates. After the habitual morning service, the king's commission was recited, listing the purpose of the expedition and praising "his dear and powerful ally", the Sultan. Indeed, good relations with the Arabs were essential for a successful descent of the Euphrates. They were also crucial to the preservation of a fixed service along the river that might make Russia hesitate before invading Iraq. As the Euphrates commenced her voyage, William Francis Ainsworth, the appointed surgeon and geologist of the expedition, mused that "the scream of the startled pelican or the gurgle of some large siluroid wallowing in the waters, was no longer necessary to break the silent ripple". At their first point of anchorage in Beles, they undertook trials of the two vessels under controlled conditions with and against the current. The Tigris trials were disappointing but the Euphrates ones were very satisfactory. The expedition's progress was overall leisurely and stops were made in several cities along the way for wood, fuel as well as historical research. On Saturday 21 May the expedition left the town of Saliggye and Chesney remembered later that the weather that morning was "very fine and promising". But a few minutes later, black clouds in the sky presaged an approaching storm. Indeed, the vessels were caught by a terrible hurricane. In his personal narrative of the events, Ainsworth recorded that "a warm dry wind, laden with the fragrance of the aromatic plants of the wilderness, followed in a few instants by a tremendous blast of wind, with some rain in large drops". After twelve minutes, the storm abated and the Tigris was nowhere to be seen. The following three days were spent in vain searching for more survivors and trying to locate the sunken vessel. By that time, Chesney had to disclose to his crew that he had been given orders to break up the expedition by the end of July. However, he trusted that the wreck of the Tigris had changed their circumstances, and believed that the government would not stand to lose their prestigious reputation by cancelling a major British project after one steamer had been inadvertently lost. Therefore, the party collectively chose to continue the descent of the river aboard Euphrates and reduce expenses by sending the survivors of the wreck back home. Euphrates then anchored at the small city of Ana, where they repaired and refuelled the steamer as well as wrote reports regarding the previous unfortunate events. Numerous episodes of "comic melodrama" then unfurled during their ensuing descent of the river. For instance, on 31 May 1836, the day Euphrates left Ana, Chesney left Ainsworth on the bank of the river during a momentary loss of memory. Ainsworth finally made his way to the vessel after having walked more than fifty miles for over two days. Another episode unfolded when Euphrates arrived at New Lemlum on 13 June 1836 and the steamer was compelled to secure itself close to town. Soon after, the ship was encircled by half-naked native of the Khezail tribe. Ainsworth recorded that "the unusual sinewy length and thinness of their limbs, a peculiarity of development which, as seen on a smaller scale in the shrimp girls of Boulogne, we could not but attribute to their living in a marsh".

Following these events, Chesney noted that the descent and survey of approximately 1200 miles of the Euphrates river had been completed by 18 June 1836. The River Karun and Bah-a-Mishir were then examined throughout September 1836. This constituted the final step of the expedition, that is, the ascent of the river Tigris to Bagdad. However, as the steamer crossed the twisting river of the Lemlum marshes, the canal narrowed and, on 24 October, Estcourt wrote that "we have now this moment anchored at a narrow winding, past which we cannot get". Since there were no new orders from India or England, Chesney was forced to make a decision about what to do with the expedition during the remaining ten weeks until the scheduled end of the mission, on 31 January 1837. The captain decided to go to Bombay himself aboard the steamer Hugh Lindsay on 1 December 1836, leaving Estcourt in charge with instructions to further examine the Karun and the Tigris. The Expedition was finally broken up by Major Estcourt, to the orders of the President of the Board of control, at Bagdad, 25 January 1837, and Chesney returned to England in 1837. According to the Captain, the expedition proved the practicability of the Euphrates route to India.

This expedition is referenced in Letitia Elizabeth Landon's poetical illustration Antioch. to an engraving of a painting by William Henry Bartlett (titled Antioch, on the Approach from Suadeah), published in Fisher's Drawing Room Scrap Book, 1837

== Life after the Expedition ==
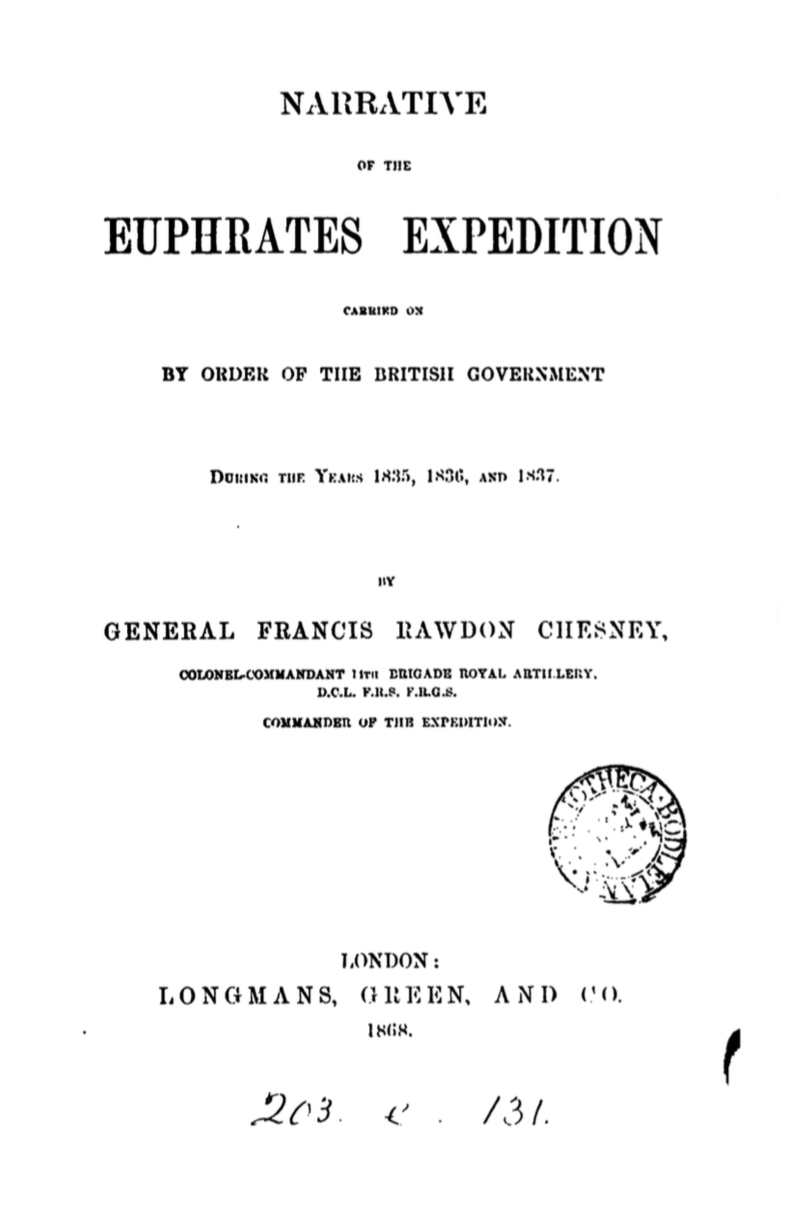
Official Narrative of the Euphrates Expedition by Captain Francis Rawdon Chesney.

Upon his return to England, Chesney was given the Royal Geographical Society's Founder's Medal, having meanwhile been to India to consult the authorities there. He was later assigned the task of writing the official account of the expedition with a grant of £1,500 by the Treasury and smaller sums by the East India Company. Chesney, ranked to Major, found it very difficult to pick up his career as he had returned to England under "a cloud of official displeasure". He devoted much time to pushing for the establishment of a line of communication with India through Turkish Arabia as he believed that the information obtained through his expedition, that is, rapidity of transit and commercial advantages "require no exemplification". However, the preparation of his two volumes on the expedition (published in 1850) was interrupted by his being ordered out in 1843 to command the artillery at Hong Kong. In 1847, his period of service was completed, and he went home to Ireland, to a life of retirement; but both in 1856 and again in 1862 he went out to the East to take a part in further surveys and negotiations for the Euphrates valley railway scheme, which, however, the government would not take up, in spite of a favourable report from the House of Commons committee in 1871. In 1868 he published a further volume of narrative on his Euphrates expedition. He died on 30 January 1872.

== Family ==
Chesney′s widow Louisa survived him by 30 years, dying in her 86th year at Beaumont Cote on 11 December 1902, in the residence of her son-in-law.

== Publications ==
- Reports on the Navigation of the Euphrates. Submitted to Government by Captain Chesney, of the Royal Artillery. Taylor, printer, 7, Little James Street, Gray's Inn. [1833]
- The Expedition for the Survey of the Rivers Euphrates and Tigris. Carried on by order of the British Government in the years 1835, 1836, 1837; preceded by Geographical and Historical Notices of the Regions situated between the Rivers Nile and Indus. In Four Volumes. With Fourteen Maps and Charts, and embellished with Ninety-seven Plates, besides numerous Woodcuts. By Lieut.-Colonel Chesney, R.A., .F.R.S., F.R.G.S., Colonel in Asia, Commander of the Expedition. By Authority. Vols. I. and II. London : Longman, Brown, Green, and Longmans, 1850. Presentation copies, 4to. Ordinary copies, Royal 8vo.
- On the Reorganization of the Royal Regiment of Artillery. By Colonel Chesney, D.C.L. and F.R.S., Royal Artillery. London: Longman, Brown, Green, and Longmans, 1851. 8vo.
- Observations on the Past and Present State of Firearms, and on the Probable Effects in War of the New Musket. With a Proposition for Reorganizing the Royal Regiment of Artillery by a Subdivision into Battalions in each special arm of Garrison, Field, and Horse Artillery, with Suggestions for Promoting its Efficiency. By Colonel Chesney, D.C.L., F.R.S., Royal Artillery. London: Longman, Brown, Green, and Longmans, 1852. 8vo.
- The Russo-Turkish Campaigns of 1828 and 1829. With a View of the Present State of Affairs in the East. By Colonel Chesney, R.A., D.C.L., F.R.S., Author of "The Expedition for the Survey of the Rivers Euphrates and Tigris." With an Appendix containing the Diplomatic Correspondence between the Four Powers, and the Secret Correspondence between the Russian and English Governments. With Maps. London: Smith, Elder, and Go., 1854; and Redfield, New York, 1854. 8vo.
- Narrative of the Euphrates Expedition. Carried on by Order of the British Government during the years 1835, 1836, and 1837. By General Francis Rawdon Chesney. Colonel Commandant 14th Brigade Royal Artillery, D.C.L., F.R.S., F.R.G.S., Commander of the Expedition. London: Longman, Green, and Co., 1868. 8vo.
- Minutes of Evidence of the Select Committee on Steam Navigation to India. 14 July 1834, p. 52, and Letter, pp. 88–91.
- Evidence on Steam Communication with India. Papers Ordered to be Printed by the House of Lords. p. 7, 23 February 1838.
- (Evidence in) Report from the Select Committee on Euphrates Valley Railway. With the Proceedings of the committee. Ordered by the House of Commons to be printed, 22 July 1872.

== See also ==
- Johann Wilhelm Helfer; participated in and wrote about the Euphrates expedition
- William Francis Ainsworth; participated in and wrote about the Euphrates expedition
- Henry Blosse Lynch; participated in the Euphrates expedition
