= List of TAVR regiments of the Royal Artillery =

Following the 1966 Defence White Paper, Britain's former Territorial Army (TA) was converted into the Territorial and Army Volunteer Reserve (TAVR) from 1 April 1967. This abolished the former regimental and divisional structure of the TA and divided units into four categories:

- TAVR I: Units available for all purposes
- TAVR II: Units with a NATO role, specifically support for the British Army of the Rhine
- TAVR III: Home defence units
- TAVR IV: Bands and the university-based Officers' Training Corps

TAVR I and II units were known as 'Volunteers', and those in TAVR III as 'Territorials'. These terms were often incorporated into the unit titles.

As far as the Royal Artillery (RA) was concerned, this meant that all existing TA regiments were amalgamated into six regiments and one independent battery of TAVR II and 17 regiments of TAVR III. When TAVR III was disbanded in 1969 the units were reduced to eight-man cadres. The cadres became part of a 'sponsoring' TAVR II unit, although continuing to wear the badges and perpetuating the traditions of their forebears. An increase in the size of the TAVR in 1971 led to the formation or re-formation of a number of regiments based on these cadres.

TAVR II

- Honourable Artillery Company
- 100 (Eastern) Medium Regiment, RA (V)
- 101 (Northumbrian) Medium Regiment, RA (V)
- 102 (Ulster and Scottish) Light Air Defence Regiment, RA (V)
- 103 (Lancashire Artillery Volunteers) Light Air Defence Regiment, RA (V)
- 104 Light Air Defence Regiment, RA (V)
- 289 Parachute Battery, Royal Horse Artillery

TAVR III

- The Buckinghamshire Regiment, RA (T)
- The County of Durham Regiment, RA (T)
- The Essex Yeomanry (Royal Horse Artillery), RA (T)
- The Flintshire and Denbighshire Yeomanry Regiment, RA (T)
- The Greater London Regiment, RA (T)
- The Highland Regiment, RA (T)
- The Humber Regiment, RA (T)
- The London and Kent Regiment, RA (T)
- The Lowland Regiment, RA (T)
- The Sheffield Artillery Volunteers, RA (T)
- The South Lancashire Territorials (Prince of Wales's Volunteers), RA (T)
- The South Nottinghamshire Hussars Yeomanry (Royal Horse Artillery), RA (T)
- The Surrey Yeomanry (Queen Mary's Regiment), RA (T)
- The Warwickshire Regiment, RA (T)
- The West Lancashire Regiment, RA (T)
- West Riding Regiment, RA (T)
- The Worcestershire Territorial Regiment, RA (T)

== External sources ==
- British Army units from 1945 on
- Land Forces of Britain, the Empire and Commonwealth – Regiments.org (archive site)
