= Instrument of Surrender =

An instrument of surrender is a surrendering document of a military conflict, as those documents are legal instruments. Some such documents are:

== World War II ==
- Japanese Instrument of Surrender
- German Instrument of Surrender
- Armistice of Cassibile
- Armistice of Malta

== Other conflicts and uses ==
- Argentine surrender in the Falklands War 1982
- Pakistani Instrument of Surrender (1971) at the end of the Bangladesh Liberation War
- "Instrument of Surrender" from the 2019 Disco Elysium (soundtrack) by Sea Power
