= Baker Barracks =

British Army barracks in West Sussex, England

- Thorney Island, West Sussex in England
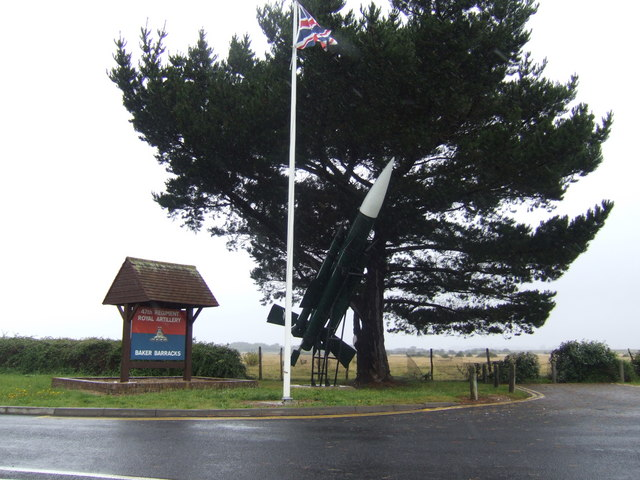
- Entrance to Baker Barracks

Site information
- Type: Barracks
- Owner: Ministry of Defence
- Operator: British Army

Location
- Shown within West Sussex
- Coordinates: 50°49′14″N 000°55′34″W

Site history
- Built: 1984
- In use: 1984-Present

Garrison information
- Garrison: Royal Regiment of Artillery
- Occupants: 12th Regiment Royal Artillery; 16th Regiment Royal Artillery; 7th Air Defence Group; Army Cadet Force

Baker Barracks is a British Army barracks located on Thorney Island, West Sussex, around 6.58 miles (10.59 km) east from Portsmouth, Hampshire. It is on the site of the former RAF Thorney Island.

== History ==
The barracks was established on the site of the former RAF Thorney Island airbase in 1986, when 26th Regiment Royal Artillery moved on site. The barracks was named after Field Marshal Sir Geoffrey Baker, a former Royal Artillery officer. It was previously home to 47th Regiment Royal Artillery, armed with the Starstreak missile.

In January 2008, 12th Regiment Royal Artillery moved to the island upon their return from Germany.

In 2009, the airfield was used as a test track for a British-built steam car hoping to smash the longest standing land speed record. The British Steam Car Challenge team included test driver Don Wales, nephew of the late Donald Campbell and grandson of Sir Malcolm Campbell.

Baker Barracks is currently home to two Royal Artillery regiments with the ground based air-defence role, operating the Thales Starstreak and Sky Sabre surface-to-air missile systems.

== Based units ==
The following units are based at Baker Barracks.

Ministry of Defence

- Centre of Specialisation for Joint Ground Based Air Defence Units (JTGBAD)

British Army

- Headquarters, 7th Air Defence Group, at Centaur House
  - 12th Regiment Royal Artillery (Self-Propelled Air Defence, armed with Alvis Stormer air defence system)
  - 16th Regiment Royal Artillery (Mobile Air Defence, armed with Sky Sabre)
- Royal School of Artillery
  - Ground Based Air Defence Wing — responsible for all training for air defence systems

Army Cadet Force

- No. 26 (Thorney Island) detachment of the Sussex Army Cadet Force, a volunteer youth organisation, sponsored by the Ministry of Defence, which accepts cadets aged between 12 and 18 years of age.
