= Alvis Stormer =

British armoured fighting vehicle

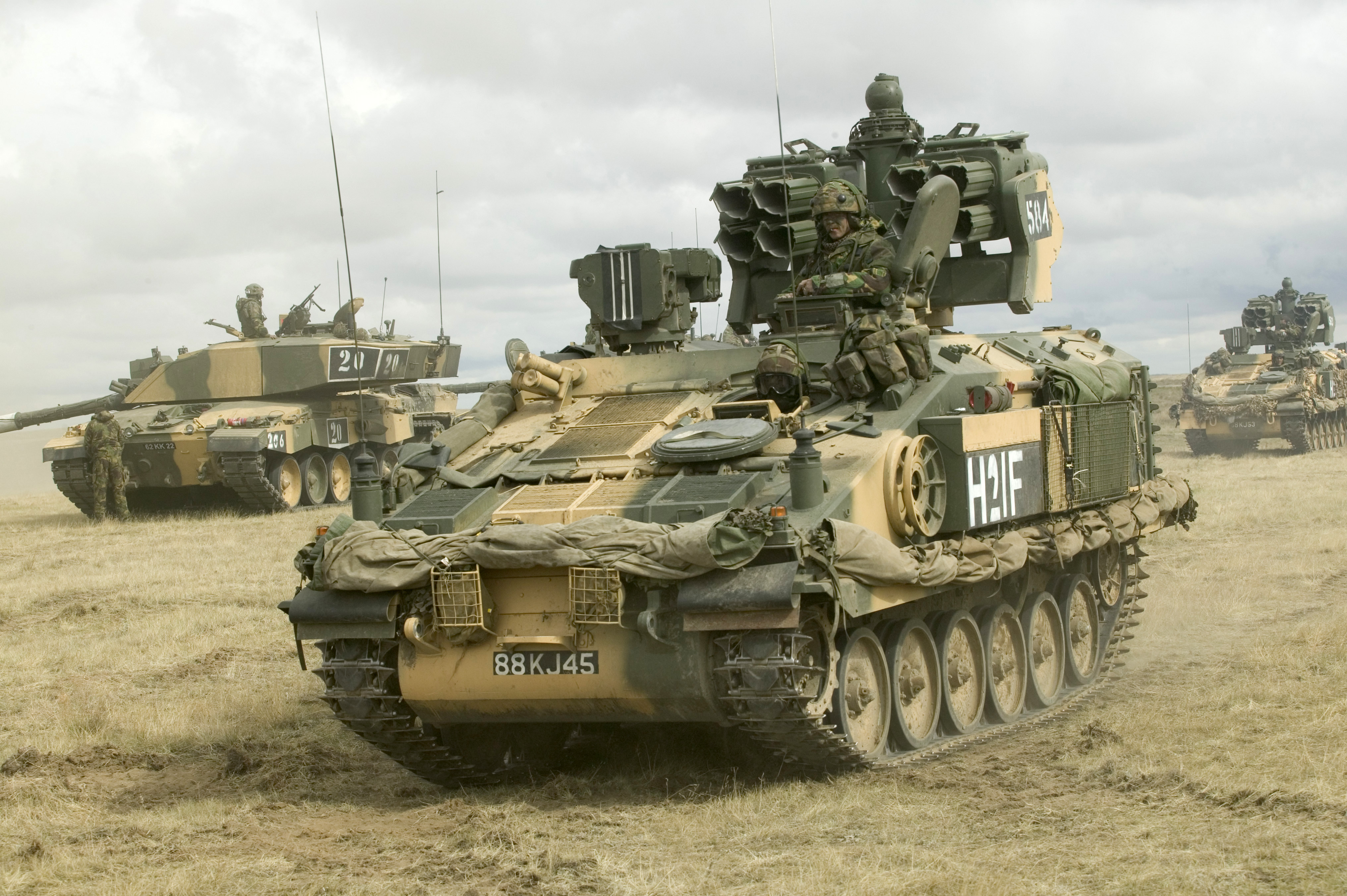
- Stormer HVM Close Air Defence Vehicles from 9 (Plassey) Battery Royal Artillery, 12th Regiment Royal Artillery, attached to 1 Bn, Royal Regiment of Fusiliers (1RRF), on Exercise MedMan, Canada
- Place of origin: United Kingdom

Production history
- No. built: over 220

Specifications
- Mass: 12.7 tonnes
- Length: 5.27 m
- Width: 2.76 m
- Height: 2.49 m
- Crew: 4
- Engine: Perkins T6.3544 6-litre, 6-cylinder diesel 250 hp (186 kW)
- Power/weight: 21 hp/tonne
- Transmission: David Brown T300
- Suspension: Torsion bar
- Operational range: 400 miles, 650 km
- Maximum speed: 50 mph, 80 km/h

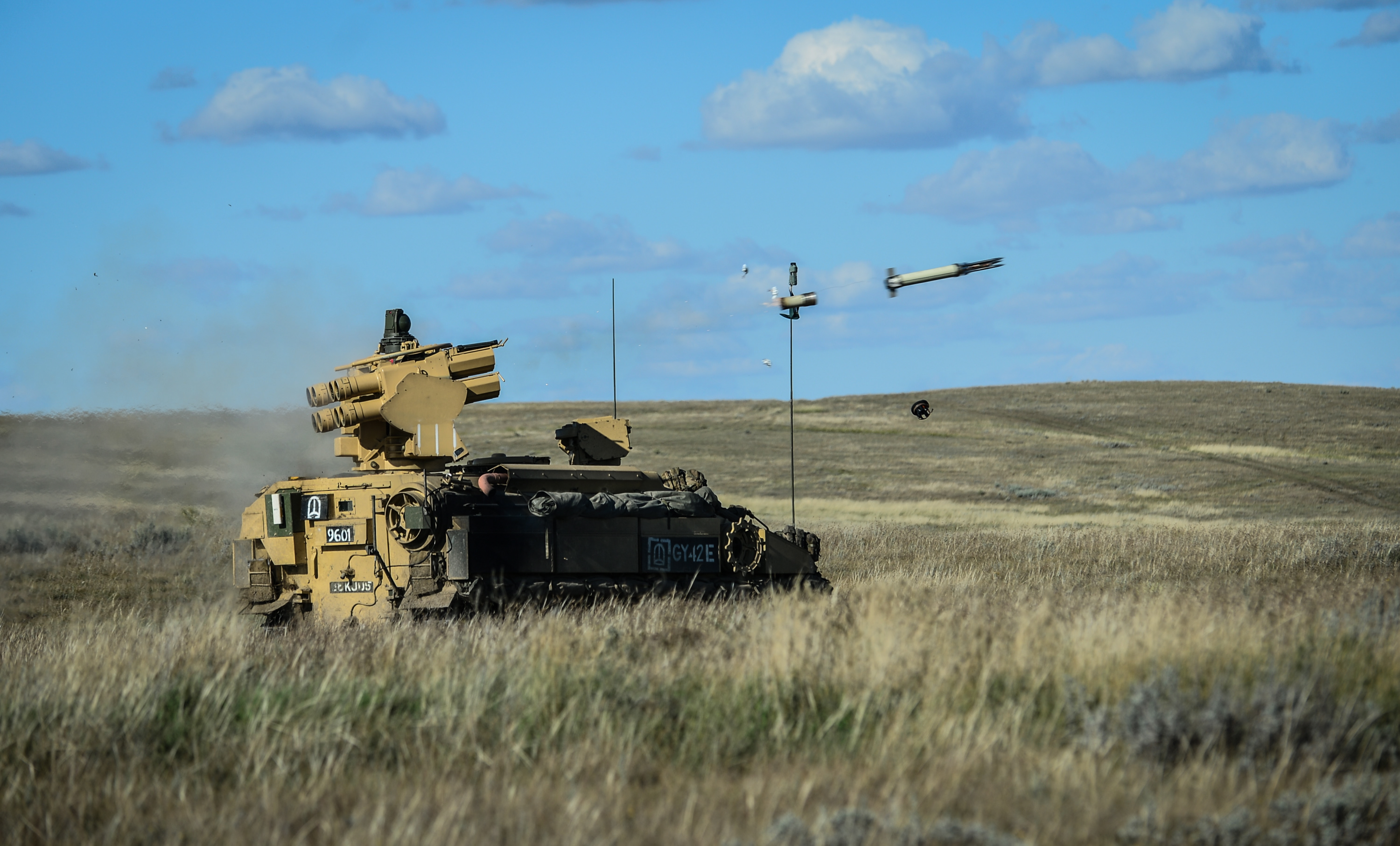
A Stormer HVM firing a Thales Starstreak

The Alvis Stormer is a military armoured vehicle manufactured by the British company Alvis Vickers, now BAE Systems Land & Armaments.

The Stormer is a development of the CVR(T) family of vehicles (Scorpion, Scimitar, Spartan etc.), essentially a larger, modernised version with an extra road-wheel on each side.

== Variants ==
As with most modern armoured fighting vehicles, the Stormer can be produced in several different configurations for different battlefield roles. It is marketed by BAE as being available in configurations such as a two-person turret armed with a 25 mm cannon, air defence (with guns or missiles), an engineer vehicle, a recovery vehicle, an ambulance, a mine layer, an 81 mm or 120 mm mortar carrier, a command and control vehicle, a bridge layer, and a logistics vehicle. Optional equipment includes a nuclear-biological-chemical protection system, an amphibious kit, passive night-vision equipment, and an air-conditioning system.

=== Stormer HVM ===
The British Army uses Stormers equipped with Starstreak HVM or Martlet missiles for short-range air defence. Under the Army 2020 plan for the British armed forces, Stormer HVM was to equip three regular and two reserve artillery batteries. The reserve batteries have since all been converted to HVM Lightweight Multiple Launcher (LML) to reduce the training burden.

=== Flat-bed Stormer ===
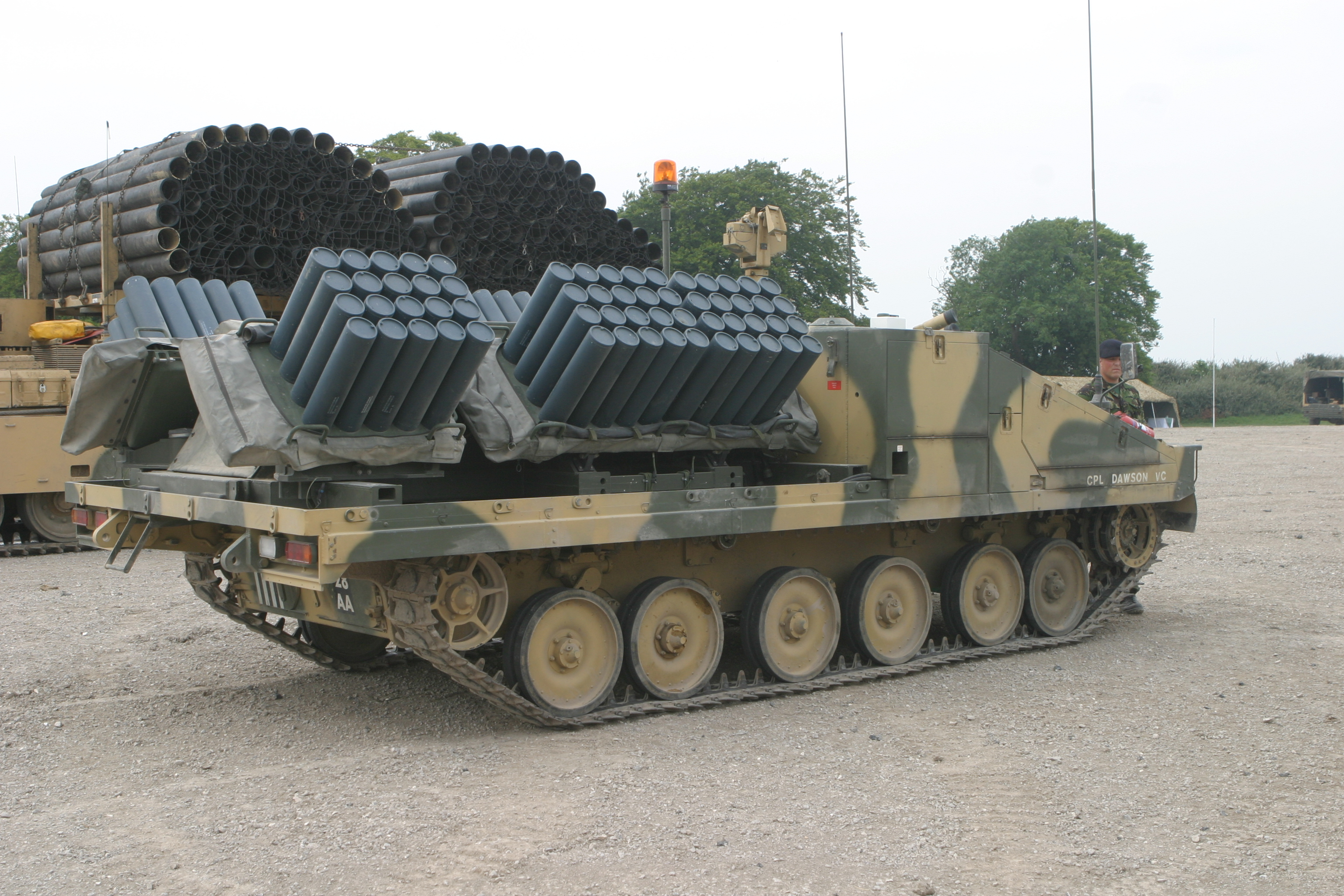
A Stormer with Shielder system

A transport version of the Stormer with a flat load bed was used to carry the Shielder minelaying system.

=== Stormer 30 ===
Stormer 30 was a development of the Stormer chassis as a tracked reconnaissance vehicle. It was a turreted version of the Stormer. It was armed with a 30 mm Bushmaster II automatic cannon. A TOW missile launcher could be fitted to either turret side. The cannon and turret could traverse through 360°.

The rate of fire of the cannon was from single shot to a maximum of 200 rounds per minute. The cannon had a double selection ammunition feed system with 180 rounds of ammunition ready to fire.

The vehicle remained in the prototype stage and did not enter service. The vehicle was to be fully air transportable by Lockheed C-130 Hercules used by the Royal Air Force aircraft as well as the Sikorsky CH-53 helicopter currently in service with NATO allies and other nations across the world.

=== Stormer Air Defence ===
The Stormer Air Defence was a prototype air defence vehicle built in the late 1980s. This variant was to mount a dual Stinger launcher, as well as either a 25 mm GAU-12/U or 30 mm GAU-13/A cannon.

== Operational history ==
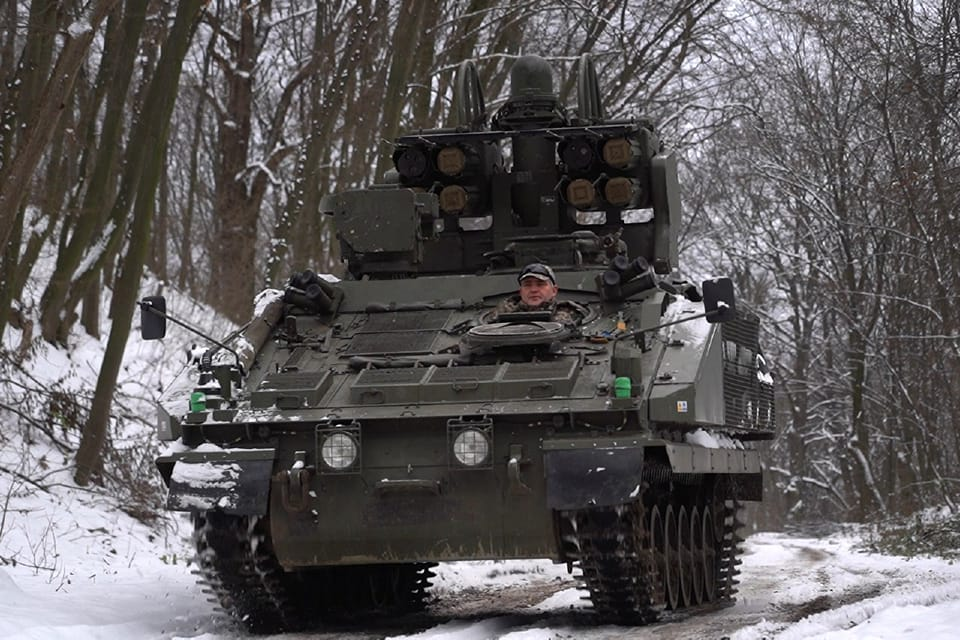
Ukrainian Stormer HVM during the Russian invasion of Ukraine

=== Indonesia ===
Stormer APCs of the Indonesian Army were deployed to Aceh province during the 2003–2004 Indonesian offensive in Aceh.

=== United Kingdom ===
The UK deployed Stormer HVMs to Iraq during the 2003 Iraq War, but they did not see combat.

=== Ukraine ===
The UK donated Stormer HVM systems to Ukraine to support its war effort following the Russian invasion of Ukraine. Six systems had arrived by 24 July 2022. Ukrainian personnel were trained on the systems in the UK.

Two Russian Orlan-10 drones were downed by Stormer HVMs in August 2022. In February 2023, footage emerged of the system downing an Iranian-supplied Shahed 13x-series drone. On 11 March 2023, the Russian Ministry of Defense released video footage showing a Stormer HVM being destroyed by a Russian ZALA Lancet loitering munition. In May 2023, footage emerged of another Lancet destroying a Stormer HVM.

The six Stormer vehicles donated to Ukraine are expected to be replaced in UK service by 12 URO VAMTAC vehicles equipped with Lightweight Multirole Missiles.

== Operators ==
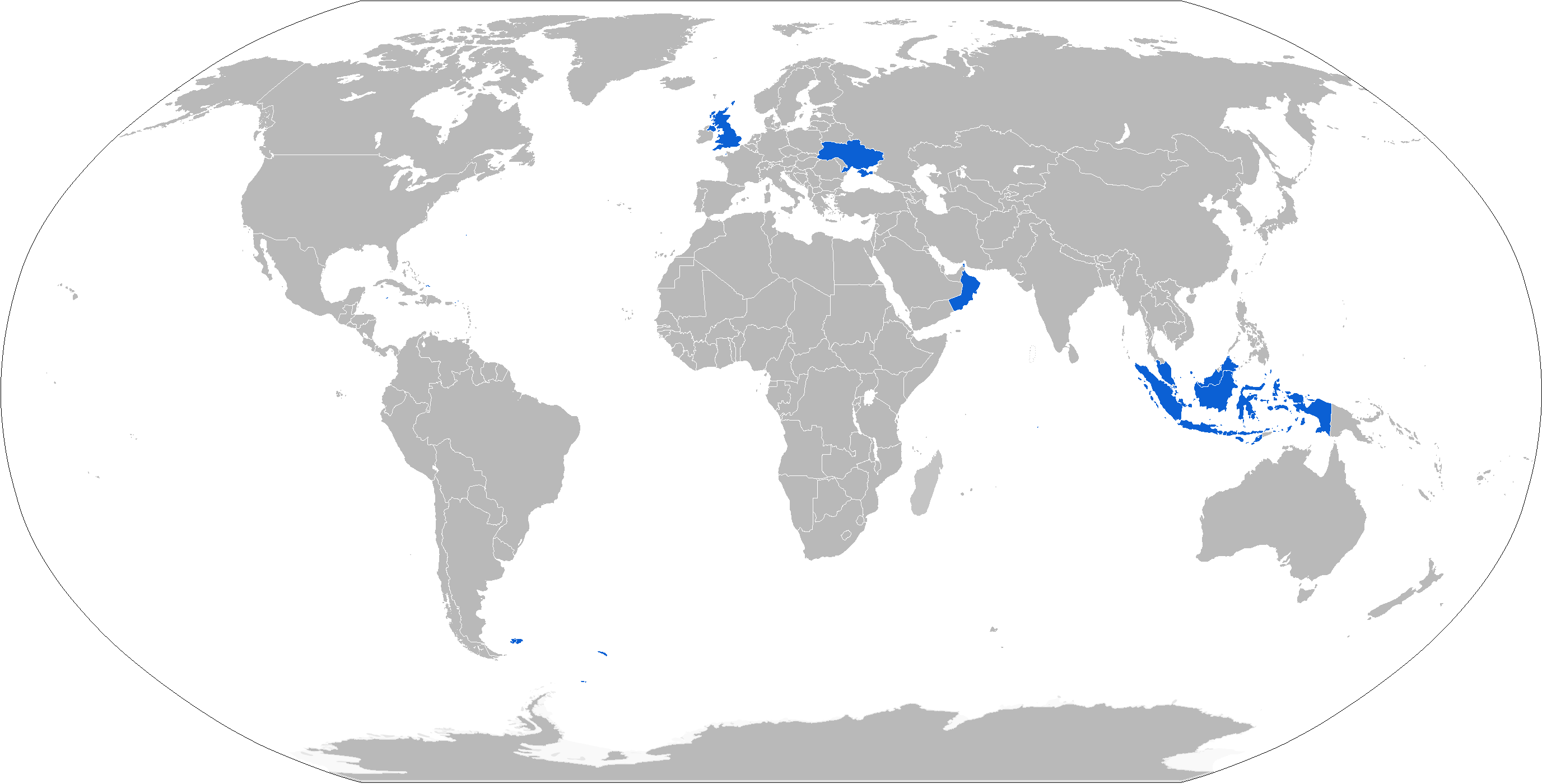
A map of Stormer operators in blue

=== Current ===
- Indonesia – 40
- Oman – 4 purchased in 1993
- Ukraine – 6 Stormer HVMs, were sent from the UK to Ukraine during the Russian invasion of Ukraine.
- United Kingdom – 64

=== Former ===
- Malaysia – 25

== See also ==
- Wiesel 2
- Raven (air defence)
