= Thorney Island (West Sussex) =

Island in West Sussex, England

Coordinates: 50°49′02″N 0°55′13″W

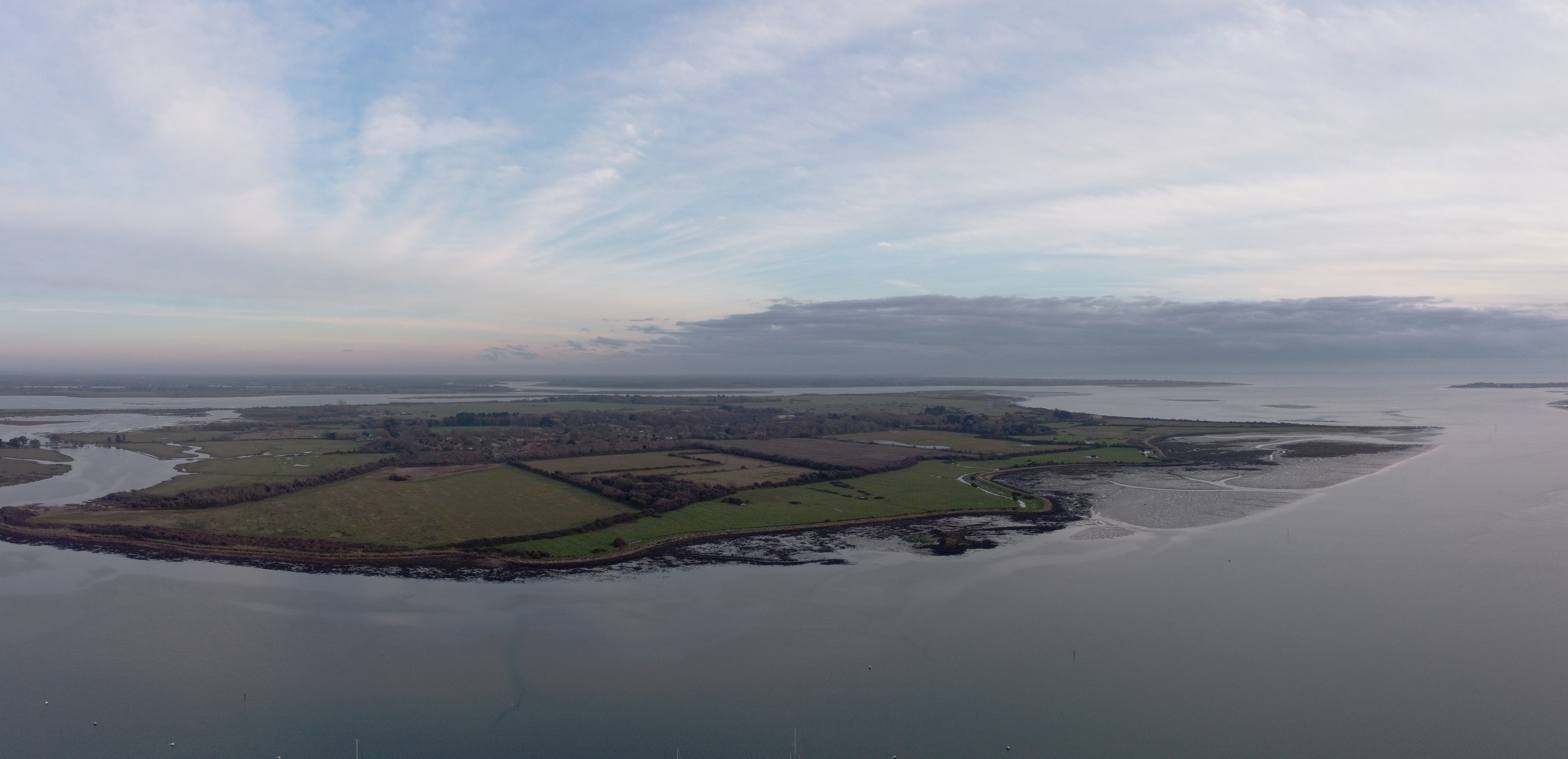
Thorney Island

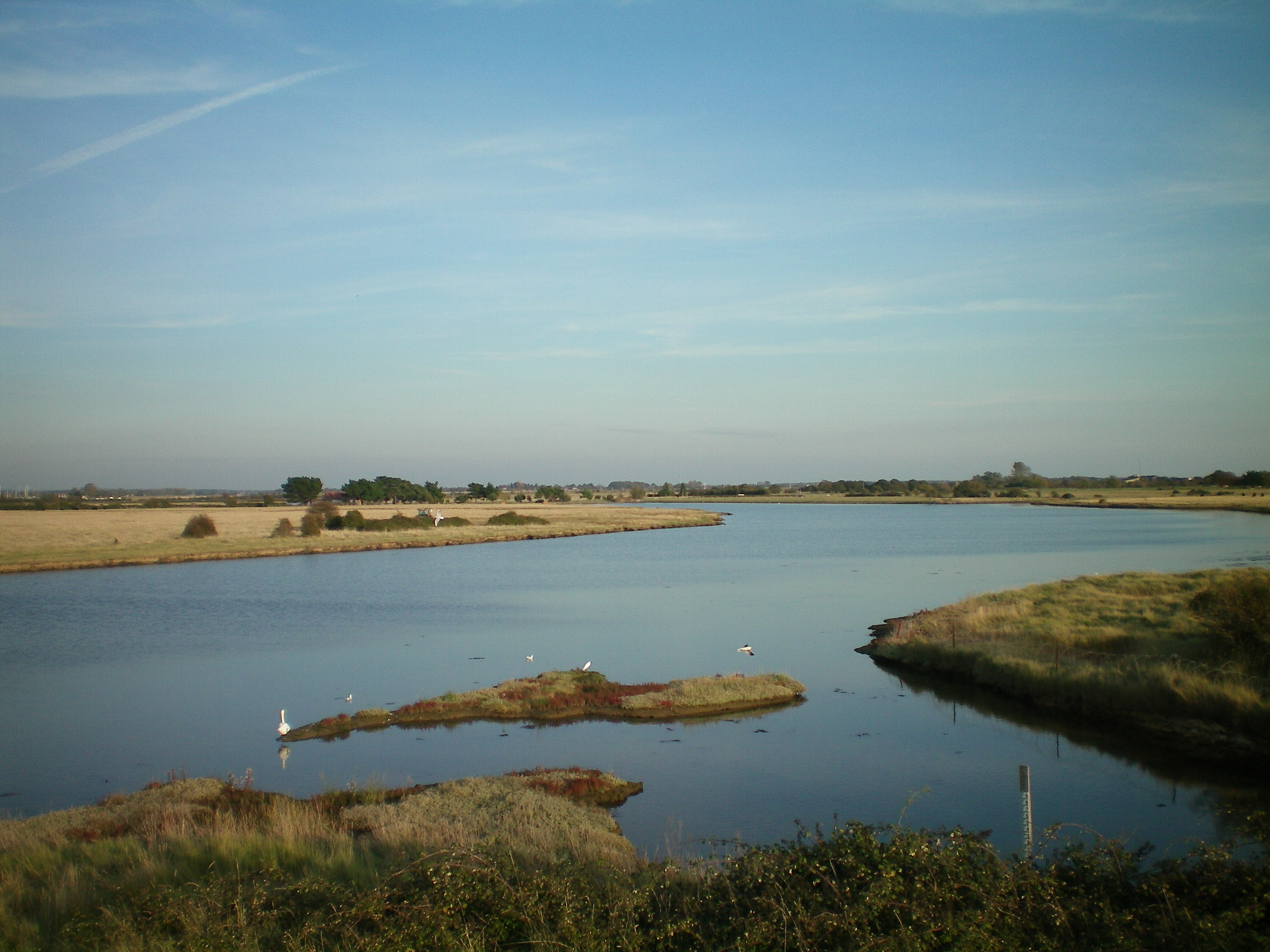
The Great Deep

Thorney Island is a British Army base, military barracks and an island. It is a peninsula owned by the MoD that juts into Chichester Harbour in West Sussex. It is separated from the mainland by a narrow channel called the Great Deep. It has a public access footpath surrounding the perimeter of the island

== Geography ==
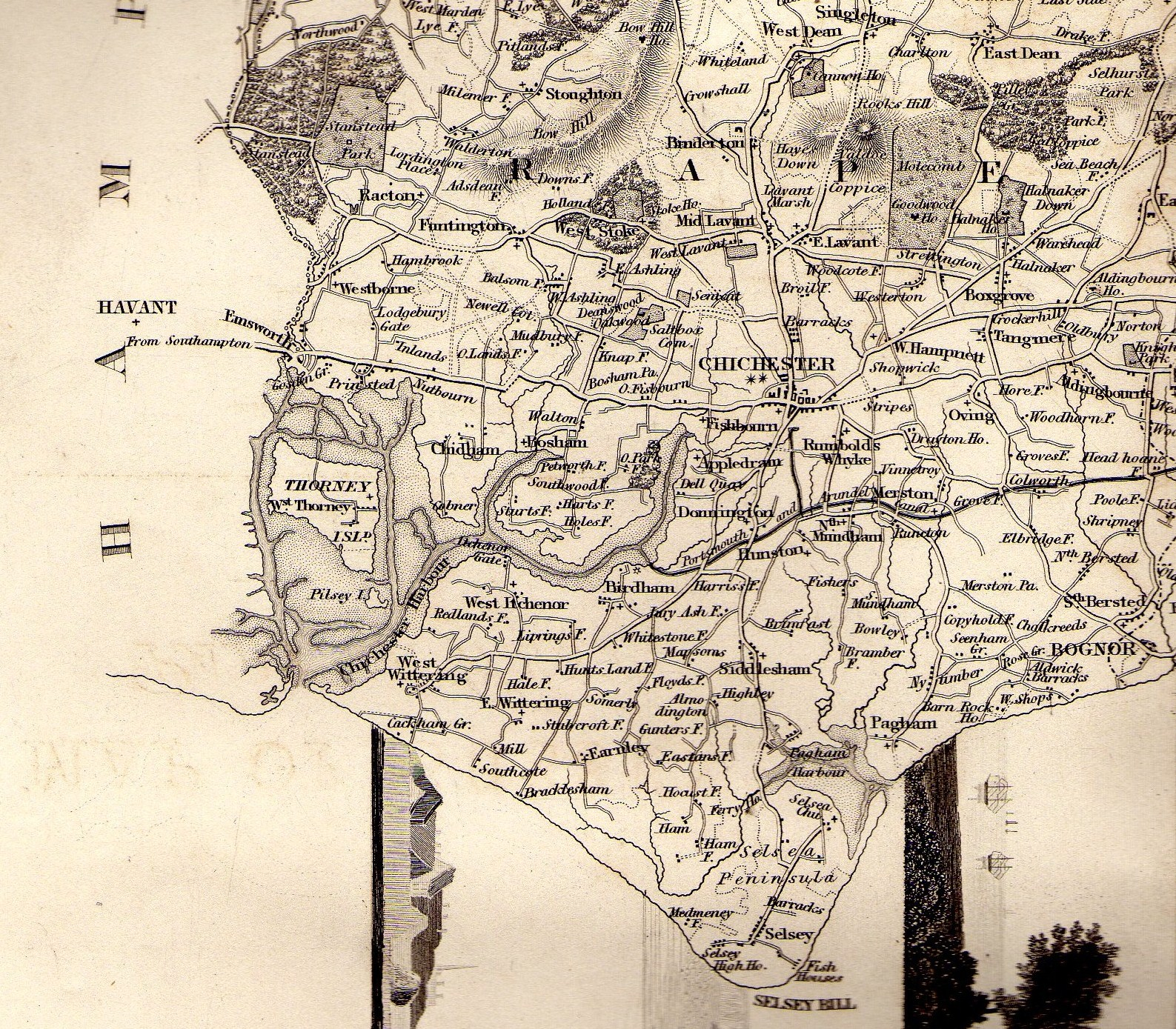
Thorney Island in 1835 (centre left) before being joined to the mainland with seawalls

To the west, the peninsula is separated from Hayling Island by the Emsworth Channel; and to the east it is separated from the Chidham peninsula by the Thorney Channel. The island is low-lying, the highest elevation above sea level is only 7 metres

The village of West Thorney lies on the east coast of the island and has been incorporated into a British Army military base which occupies the island south of Great Deep. A coastal public footpath, part of the Sussex Border Path, encircles the peninsula, but public access to the south of the island is limited to the footpath and the church of St Nicholas at West Thorney.

Walkers using the footpath may be asked by intercom to provide their contact details (name, address and mobile phone number) at the security gates to access the southern part of the island. Walkers must keep to the footpath marked with the yellow posts. During the winter months, fortnightly shoots are held on Thorney for partridge, pheasant and snipe.

To the south of the island is Pilsey Island, now joined to Thorney Island by a sandbank, which is an RSPB nature reserve.

The 2001 census showed the island to have a resident population of 1,079.

== Climate ==
The climate of Thorney Island is generally milder than much of the UK, but slightly cooler than other areas locally due to being quite rural. The record high temperature is 35.2 °C (95 °F) on 6 August 2003 and the record low is −9.3 °C (15 °F) on 13 January 1987.

The Met Office has an official weather station situated at Baker Barracks, the Royal Artillery base on Thorney Island.

Climate data for Thorney Island (Note: Weather station is located 8.0 miles (12.9 km) from the Portsmouth city centre.) (1991–2020 normals, extremes 1957–present)
Month	Jan	Feb	Mar	Apr	May	Jun	Jul	Aug	Sep	Oct	Nov	Dec	Year
Record high °C (°F)	13.6 (56.5)	15.8 (60.4)	20.7 (69.3)	24.2 (75.6)	29.3 (84.7)	34.9 (94.8)	34.1 (93.4)	33.3 (91.9)	29.0 (84.2)	25.2 (77.4)	17.9 (64.2)	14.9 (58.8)	34.9 (94.8)
Mean daily maximum °C (°F)	8.3 (46.9)	8.6 (47.5)	11.0 (51.8)	13.7 (56.7)	16.7 (62.1)	19.7 (67.5)	21.8 (71.2)	21.8 (71.2)	19.4 (66.9)	15.6 (60.1)	11.7 (53.1)	9.0 (48.2)	14.8 (58.6)
Daily mean °C (°F)	5.6 (42.1)	5.7 (42.3)	7.5 (45.5)	9.7 (49.5)	12.7 (54.9)	15.7 (60.3)	17.7 (63.9)	17.8 (64.0)	15.5 (59.9)	12.3 (54.1)	8.7 (47.7)	6.2 (43.2)	11.3 (52.3)
Mean daily minimum °C (°F)	2.8 (37.0)	2.7 (36.9)	4.0 (39.2)	5.7 (42.3)	8.7 (47.7)	11.6 (52.9)	13.6 (56.5)	13.7 (56.7)	11.5 (52.7)	8.9 (48.0)	5.6 (42.1)	3.3 (37.9)	7.7 (45.9)
Record low °C (°F)	−9.2 (15.4)	−7.0 (19.4)	−6.9 (19.6)	−3.8 (25.2)	−1.6 (29.1)	1.4 (34.5)	6.0 (42.8)	3.6 (38.5)	2.2 (36.0)	−2.8 (27.0)	−6.3 (20.7)	−8.7 (16.3)	−9.2 (15.4)
Average precipitation mm (inches)	84.5 (3.33)	57.7 (2.27)	49.9 (1.96)	49.6 (1.95)	43.3 (1.70)	48.2 (1.90)	46.9 (1.85)	57.2 (2.25)	61.4 (2.42)	86.0 (3.39)	90.6 (3.57)	92.6 (3.65)	767.7 (30.22)
Average precipitation days (≥ 1.0 mm)	13.0	10.1	9.2	9.1	8.0	7.7	7.5	8.4	8.1	11.3	12.9	12.8	118.1
Mean monthly sunshine hours	64.9	85.1	129.7	186.5	221.8	217.8	232.1	213.5	163.1	118.1	78.1	61.1	1,771.7
Source 1: Met Office
Source 2: Starlings Roost Weather

== RAF Thorney Island and Baker Barracks ==
Many of the civilian residents were cleared from the island, and the RAF airfield on Thorney Island was built in 1938. Eventually the entire civilian population of the island was cleared, the island was requisitioned, and the village of West Thorney was demolished and replaced with military housing.

A Commonwealth War Grave in the medieval churchyard contains a number of Commonwealth, particularly Canadian, and British aircrew along with German pilots who were killed in the area.

Subsequently, the Royal Navy expressed an interest in using the base.

In 1985, a series of experiments referred to as the "Thorney Island Heavy Gas Dispersion Trials" investigating atmospheric dispersion of gases was carried out on the island.

In 1984 the base was renamed Baker Barracks to house a Royal Artillery unit, the 26th Field Regiment Royal Artillery, armed with the FH70. Later, the 26th Field Regiment Royal Artillery was replaced on the island by the 47th Regiment Royal Artillery, armed with the Starstreak HVM. In January 2008, the 12th Regiment Royal Artillery moved to the island on their return from Germany. 47 Regiment subsequently relocated from Thorney Island to Larkhill, Wiltshire, under restructuring of the British Army as part of the Army 2020 programme.

In 2009, the airfield was used as a test track for a British-built steam car hoping to break the longest standing land speed record. The British Steam Car Challenge team included test driver Don Wales, nephew of the late Donald Campbell and grandson of Sir Malcolm Campbell.

Baker Barracks is also host to No26 (Thorney Island) Detachment of the Army Cadet Force, a national volunteer youth organisation sponsored by the MoD to provide military and adventurous training to those aged 12 to 18 years old.

The entire island remains an Army Barracks containing military infrastructure and accommodation, including housing for military families. The island is not open to the public with the exception of a public footpath that circles the island, except by permission. There is a sailing club on the east side of the island with both services and civilian members. The airfield is currently used as a car park for the nearby Royal Artillery Equestrian Centre and providing Compulsory Basic Training for motorcycle riders.
