= Land Environment Air Picture Provision =

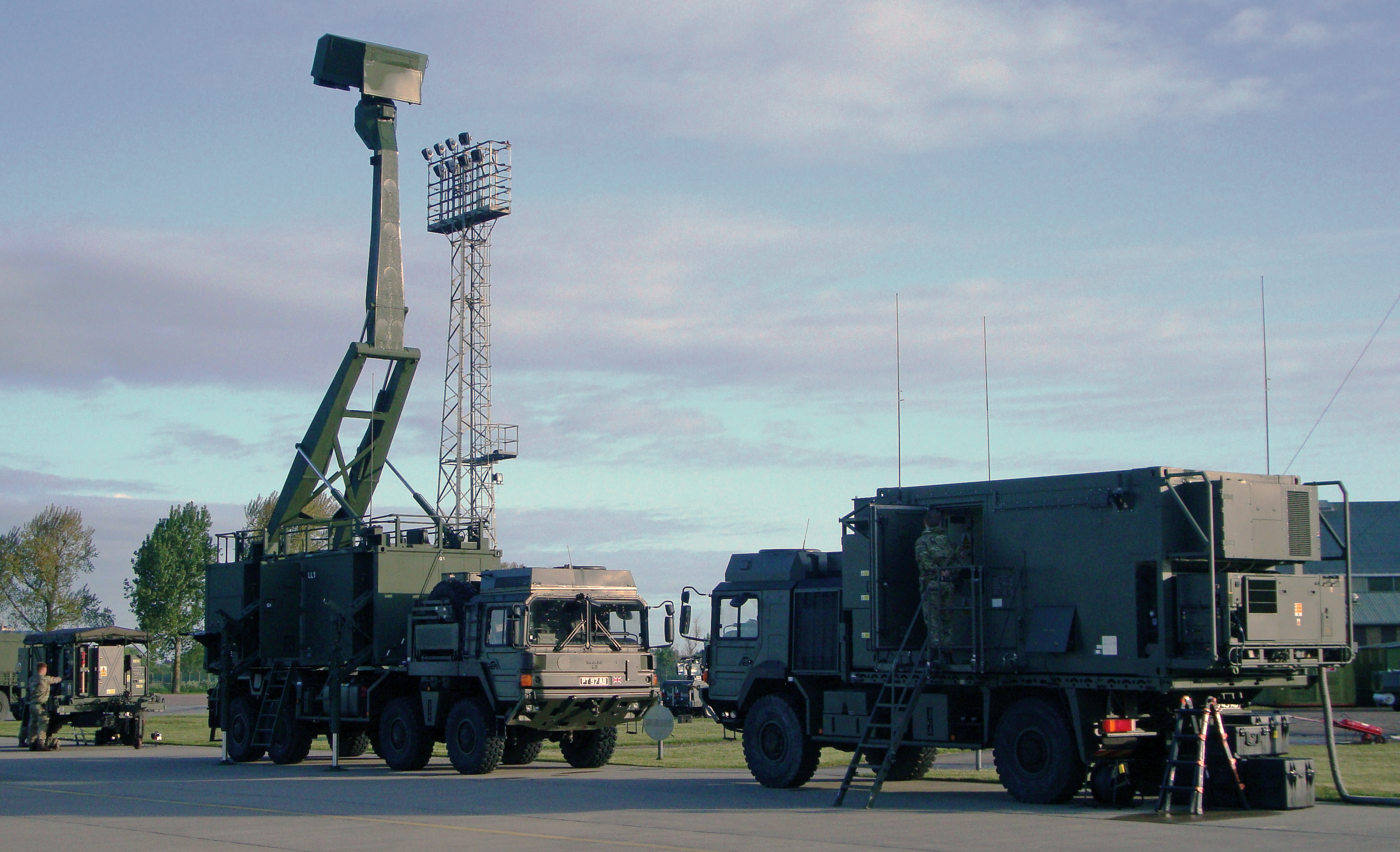
- LEAPP Unit in 2015
- Country of origin: United Kingdom
- Introduced: 2015
- Type: Multi Source Fused Recognised Air Picture Capability

Land Environment Air Picture Provision (LEAPP) is a British military capability introduced in early 2015. The capability was developed as part of a UK specific requirement to deliver a highly mobile local fused Recognised Air Picture capability to land component and formation headquarters. Its development was led by Lockheed Martin (UK) along with a number of other defence contractors, including SAAB.

== Utility ==
The capability is currently fielded with 49 (Inkerman) Battery Royal Artillery (a Royal Regiment of Artillery sub-unit commanded by a Royal Air Force Squadron Leader) under the command of 16th Regiment Royal Artillery. This system can both generate a local air picture, utilising its integral Giraffe-Agile Multi Beam (G-AMB) radar, and fuse it with a wider Air Picture from other platforms such as land and air based radars, to provide and disseminate a local Recognised Air Picture to Land Forces.

The capability provides early Air Defence warning at Brigade and Divisional level and can assist with Battlespace Management. This capability is in high demand across UK Defence and whilst it is designed primarily to support armoured brigades, it is also held at readiness against the Air Assault Task Force (AATF), Lead Armoured Task Force (LATF) and the Vanguard Armoured Infantry Brigade (VAIB). The capability is scalable and consists of a number of components which can be deployed independently of one another if required. Whilst the Giraffe Radar is integral to the system it is not essential to allow the capability to operate if other radar platforms are available.

== Operators ==
United Kingdom

- British Army – 1 Battery, serving with the Royal Regiment of Artillery
