= 12th Regiment Royal Artillery =

British Army artillery regiment

- Active: 1947–present
- Allegiance: United Kingdom
- Branch: British Army
- Role: Ground Based Air Defence
- Size: 6 Batteries; Almost 700 personnel
- Part of: 7 Air Defence Group
- Garrison/HQ: Baker Barracks, Thorney Island
- Nicknames: The Lancashire & Cumbrian Gunners and The Stormers
- Equipment: HVM Stormer (armour) & HVM LML (light role) equipped with the Starstreak missile & Light Multirole Missile

Commanders
- Current commander: Lieutenant Colonel Maarten Magee RA

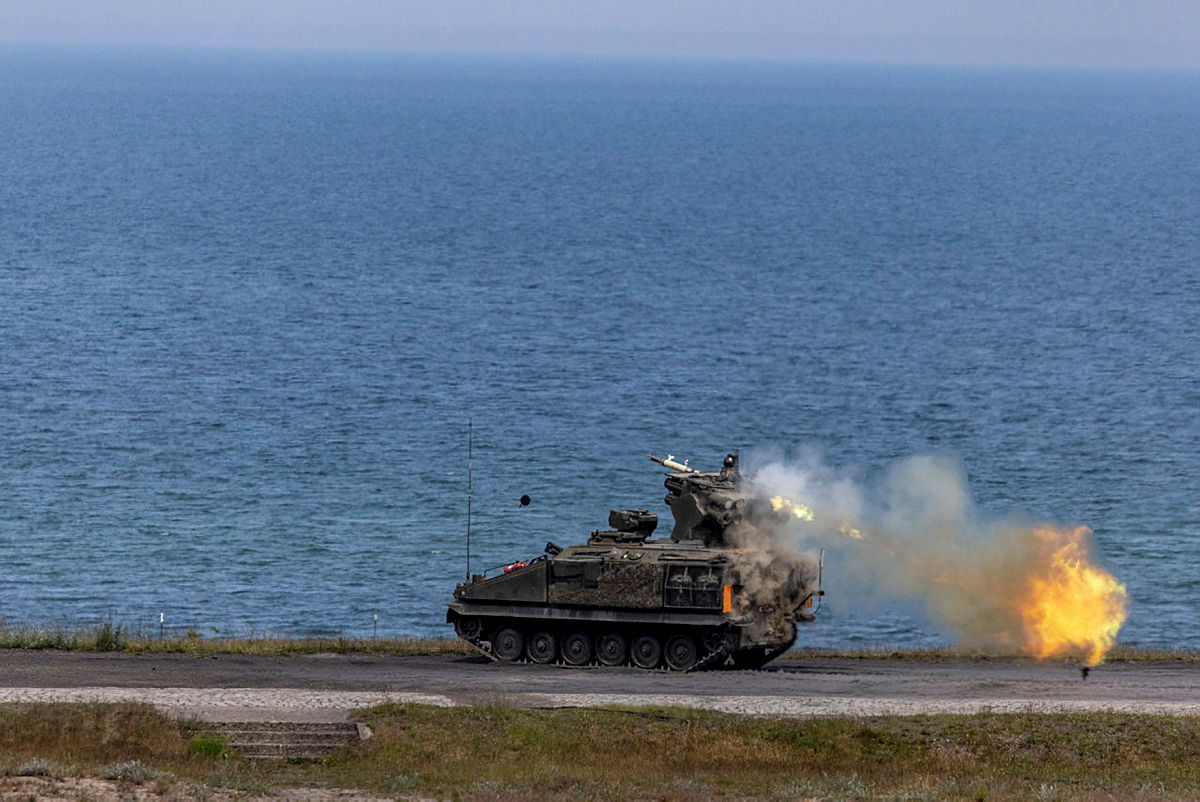
A HVM Stormer live firing.

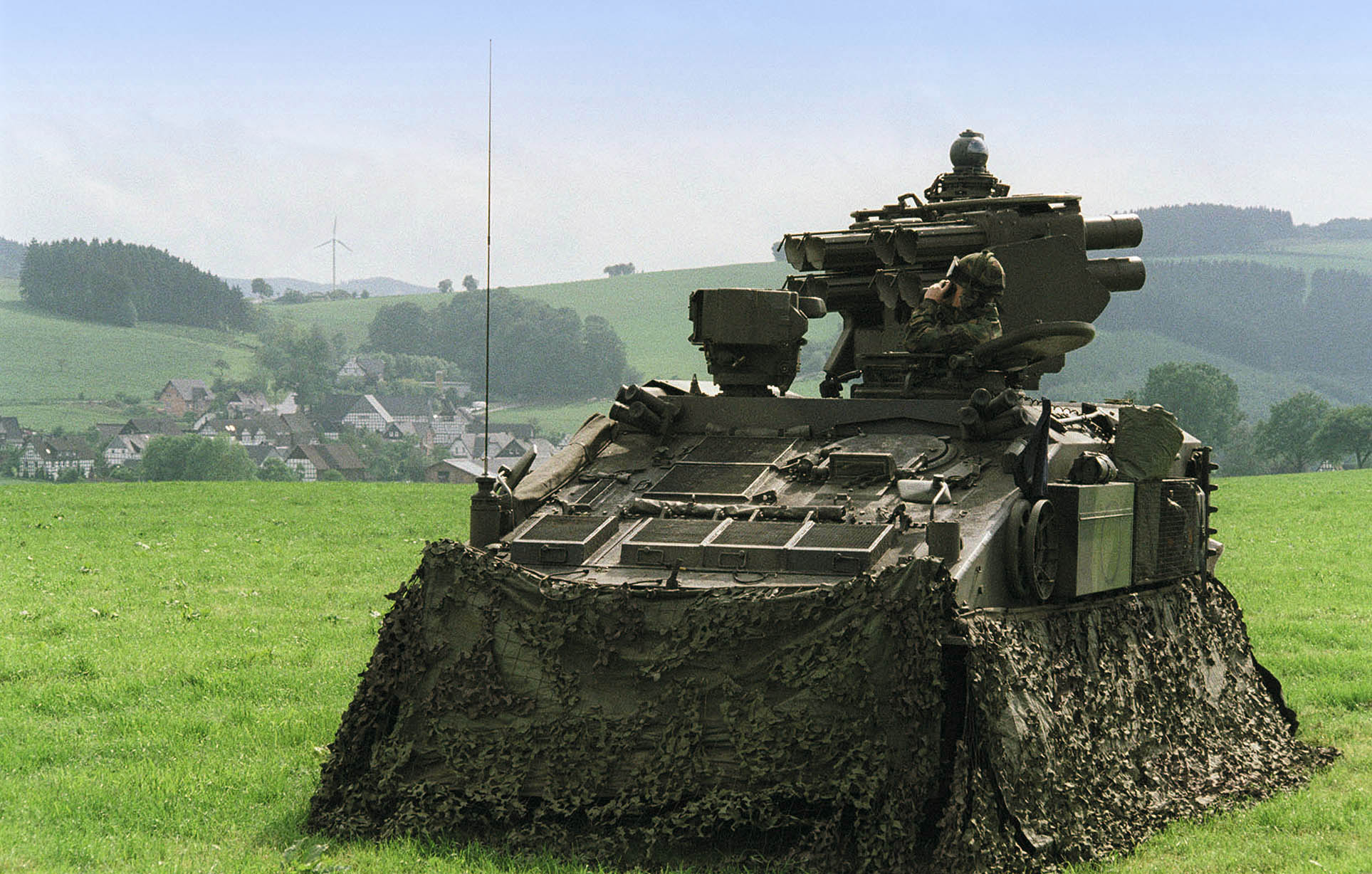
An HVM Stormer from 9 Bty. 12 Regt RA searching for enemy aircraft during an exercise in Germany

12 Regiment Royal Artillery is a regiment of the Royal Artillery in the British Army. It currently serves in the air defence role, and is equipped with the Starstreak missile.

== History ==
The regiment was established in 1947 when the 7th Regiment, Royal Horse Artillery, was retitled the 12th Anti-Tank Regiment Royal Artillery. It was deployed to Palestine that year, to Libya in 1948 and Trieste in 1950. It also saw action in Malaya in 1963 and Borneo in 1964. Units saw tours in Northern Ireland during the Troubles in 1971, 1974, 1977, 1979 and 1988. T Battery and 9 Battery were sent to the South Atlantic during the Falklands War in 1982. T Battery and 58 Battery saw action during the Gulf War in 1991. 12 Battery was deployed for the 2003 invasion of Iraq.

In January 2008, the regiment moved to the Baker Barracks, Thorney Island, upon its return from Germany.

Under Army 2020 Refine, T Battery was re-roled from the headquarters battery to form a further Stormer HVM battery while 170 (Imjin) Battery was brought out of suspended animation to take their place as headquarters battery.

== Batteries ==
The batteries are as follows:

- T Battery (Shah Sujah's Troop) Royal Artillery — Stormer HVM & LMM
- 9 (Plassey) Battery Royal Artillery — Stormer HVM & LMM
- 12 (Minden) Air Assault Battery Royal Artillery — LML HVM & LMM
- 58 (Eyre's) Battery Royal Artillery — Stormer HVM & LMM
- 137 (Java) Battery Royal Artillery — Stormer HVM & LMM
- 170 (Imjin) Battery Royal Artillery — Headquarters Battery
