= Ippv =

ippv or IPPV, or similar, may refer to:

- internet pay-per-view (iPPV)
- intermittent positive pressure ventilation (IPPV)
- indapyrophenidone (IPPV)

== See also ==
- PPV (disambiguation)
- IPV (disambiguation)
