= UROVESA =

Spanish heavy vehicle manufacturer

URO, Vehículos Especiales, S.A.
- Company type: Sociedad Anónima
- Industry: Automotive
- Founded: 23 October 1981; 44 years ago
- Headquarters: Santiago de Compostela, Galicia, Spain
- Products: VAMTAC, URO
- Subsidiaries: UROMAC
- Website: www.urovesa.com

URO, Vehículos Especiales, S.A. (UROVESA) is a Spanish heavy vehicle manufacturer based in Santiago de Compostela, Galicia. It is best known for the production of the URO VAMTAC, a Humvee-like four-wheel drive motor vehicle, and URO trucks.

== History ==
The company was founded in 1981 by a group of former employees of IPV. Since 1984, they are an official supplier to the Spanish Army - who currently have over 1,000 URO vehicles.

In 1991 the subsidiary UROMAC was created, based in Castropol, Asturias manufactures forklift trucks and dump trucks.

The end of the first decade of the 21st century was for UROVESA a period of intense decline in its business volume, due to the drop in public budgets coupled with a delay in the call for tenders for the acquisitions of the different customers.

UROVESA currently supplies its products to more than twenty-five countries on five continents, making it an international benchmark in the sector.

== Models ==
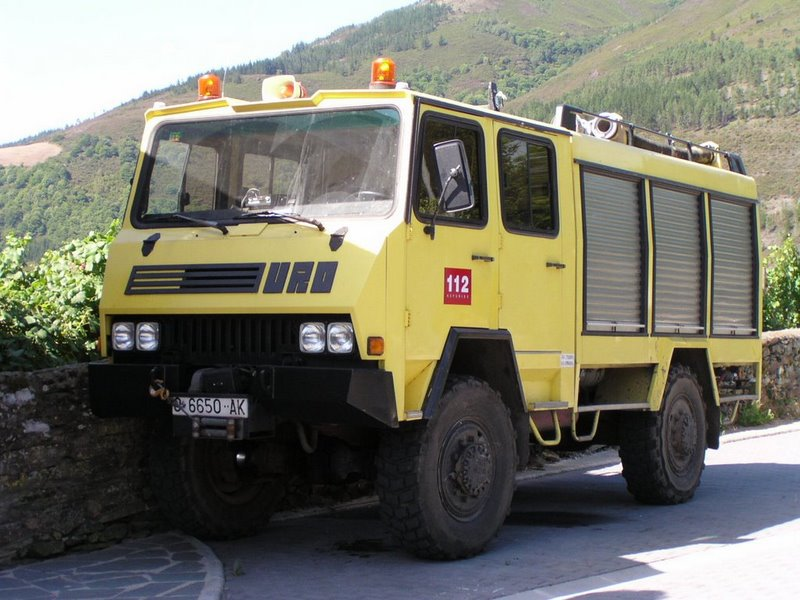
URO rural firefighting truck in North Spain

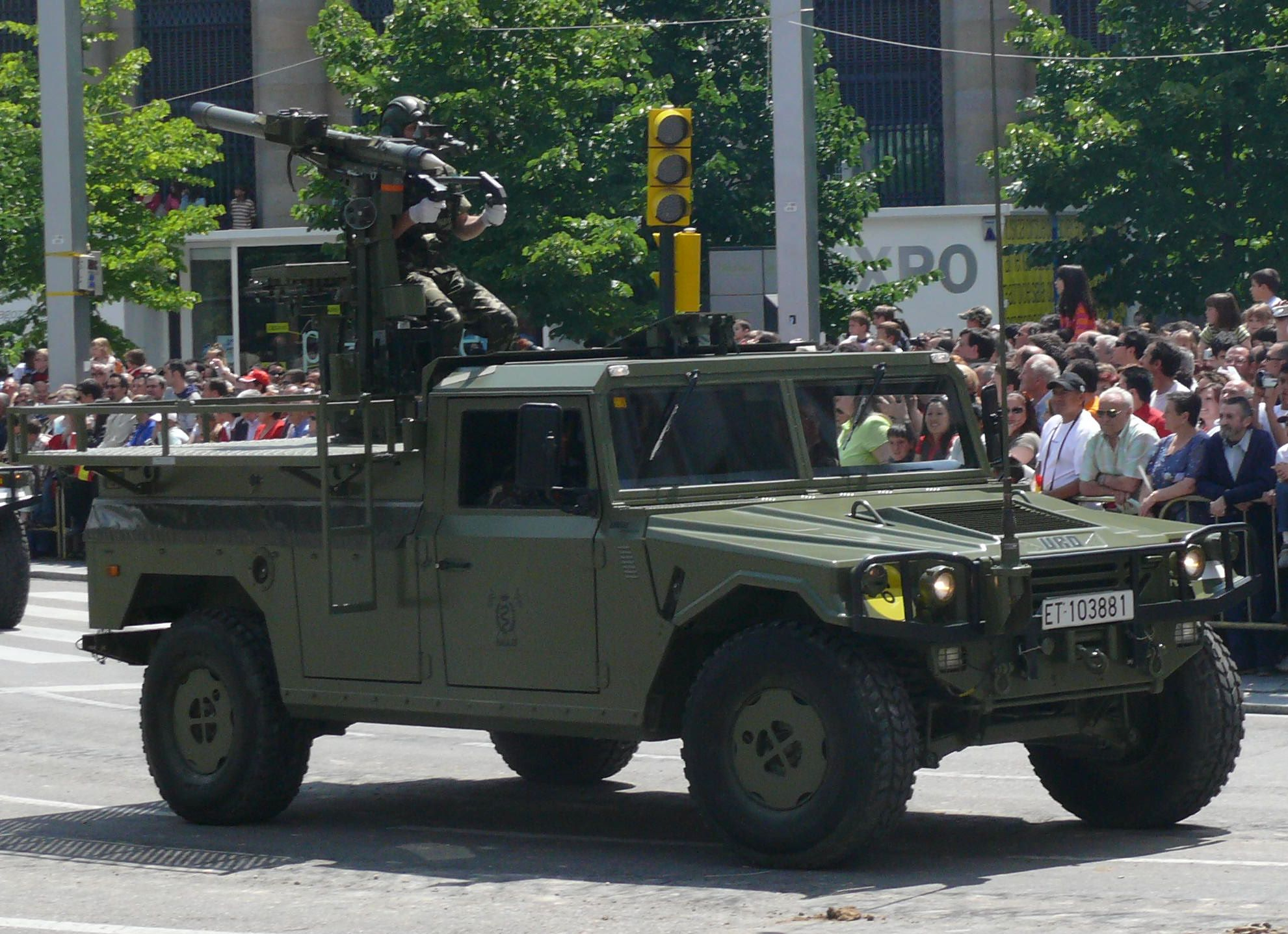
An URO VAMTAC

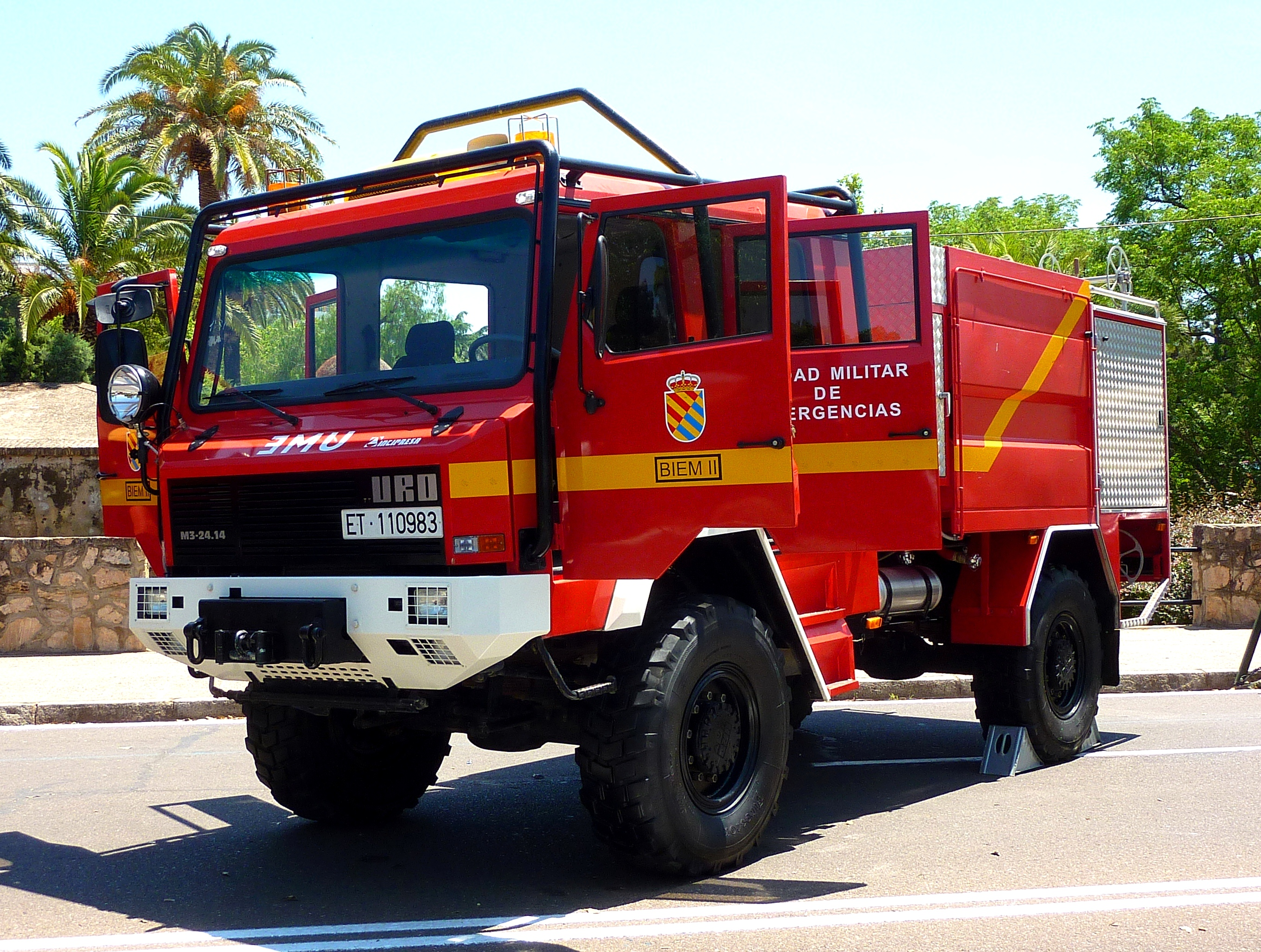
URO M3-24.14 of the Emergency Military Unit
