= IPV =

The initialism IPV may refer to:

== Medicine ==
- Inactivated poliovirus vaccine
- Intrapulmonary percussive ventilator
- Infectious pustular vulvovaginitis

== Violence ==
- Interpersonal violence
- Intimate partner violence, a form of domestic violence

== Other ==
- Impact protection vehicle
- Internet Protocol Version
- Investigación y Proyectos de Vehículos Especiales, a Spanish brand of trucks
- Polytechnic Institute of Viseu, Portugal
