= Uro (trucks) =

Spanish truck brand

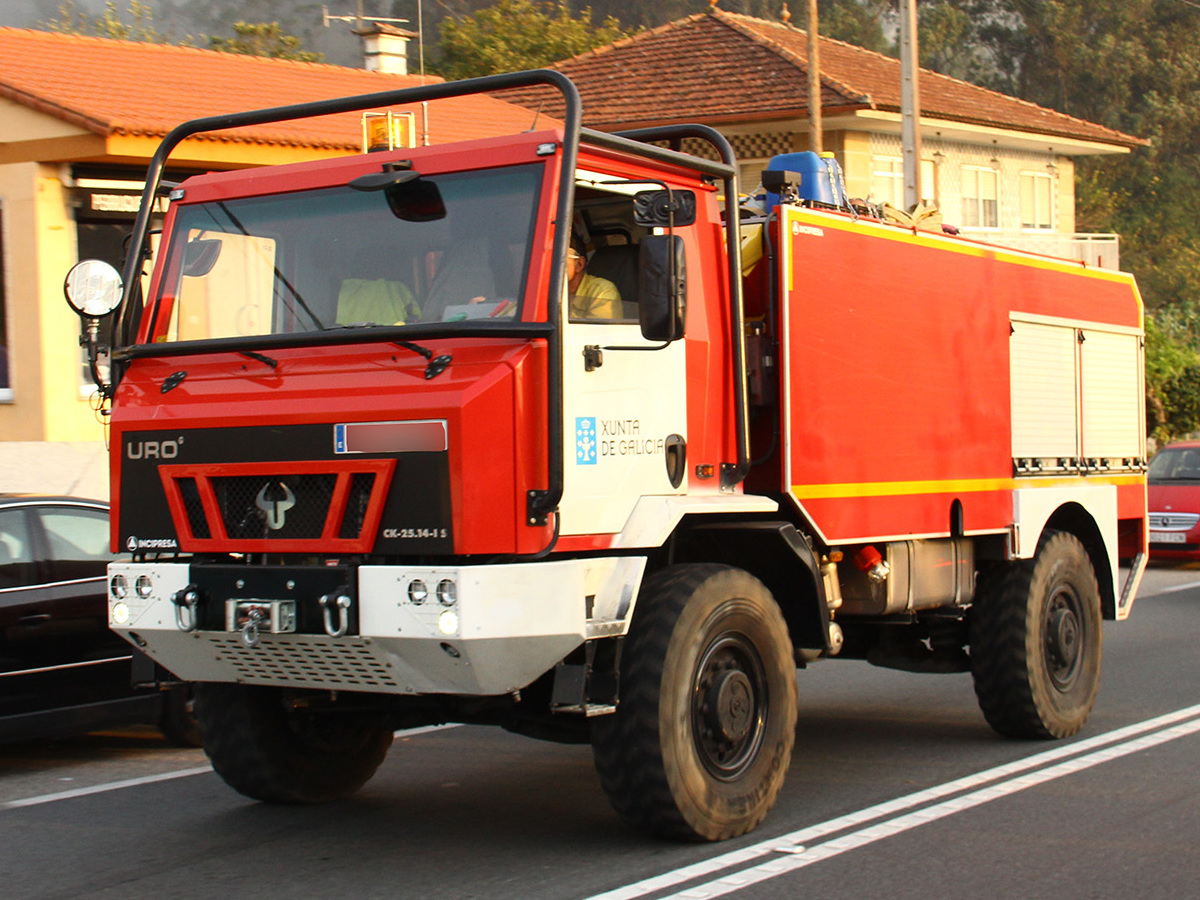
Uro rural firefighting truck in North Spain

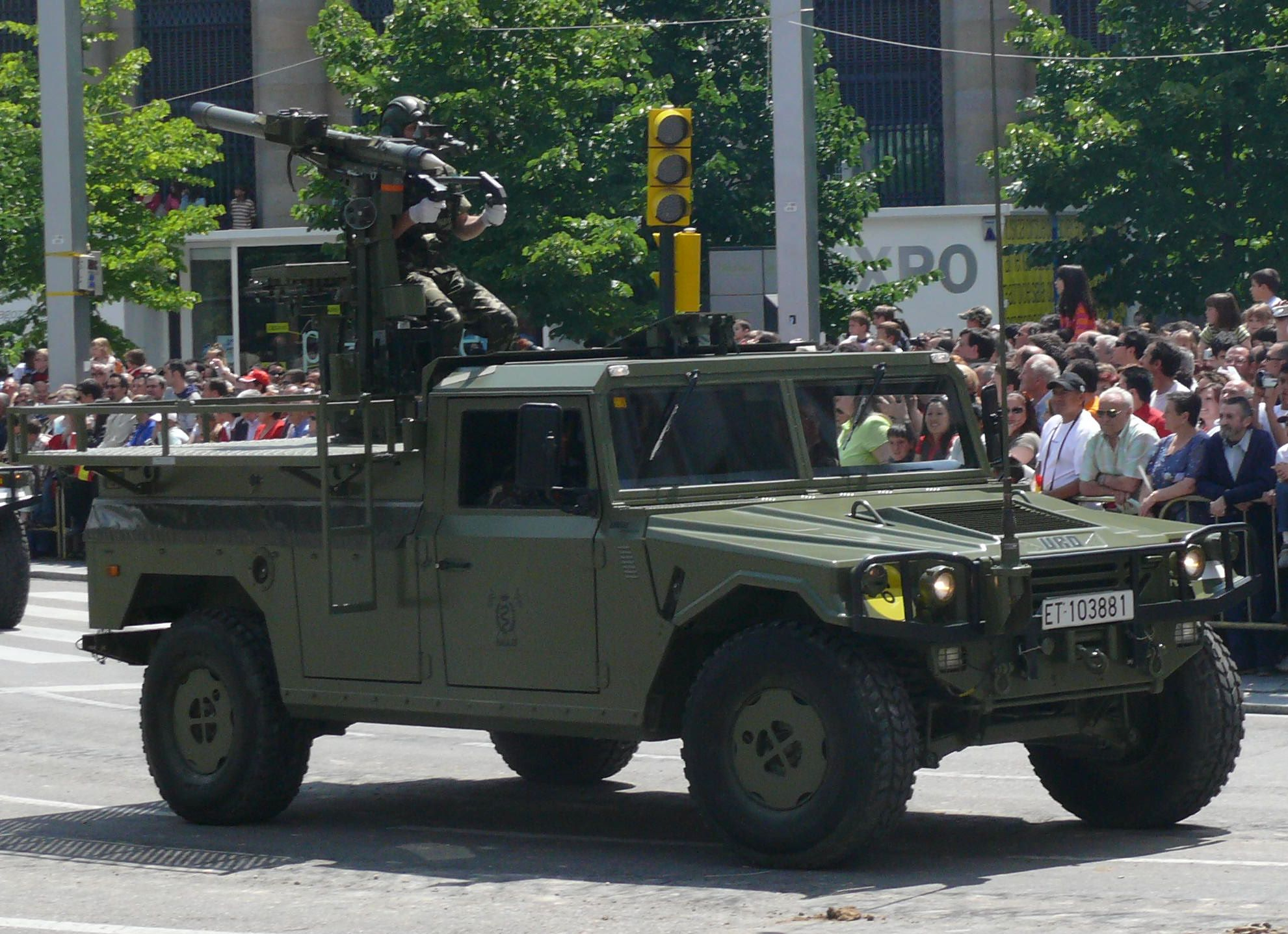
URO VAMTAC.

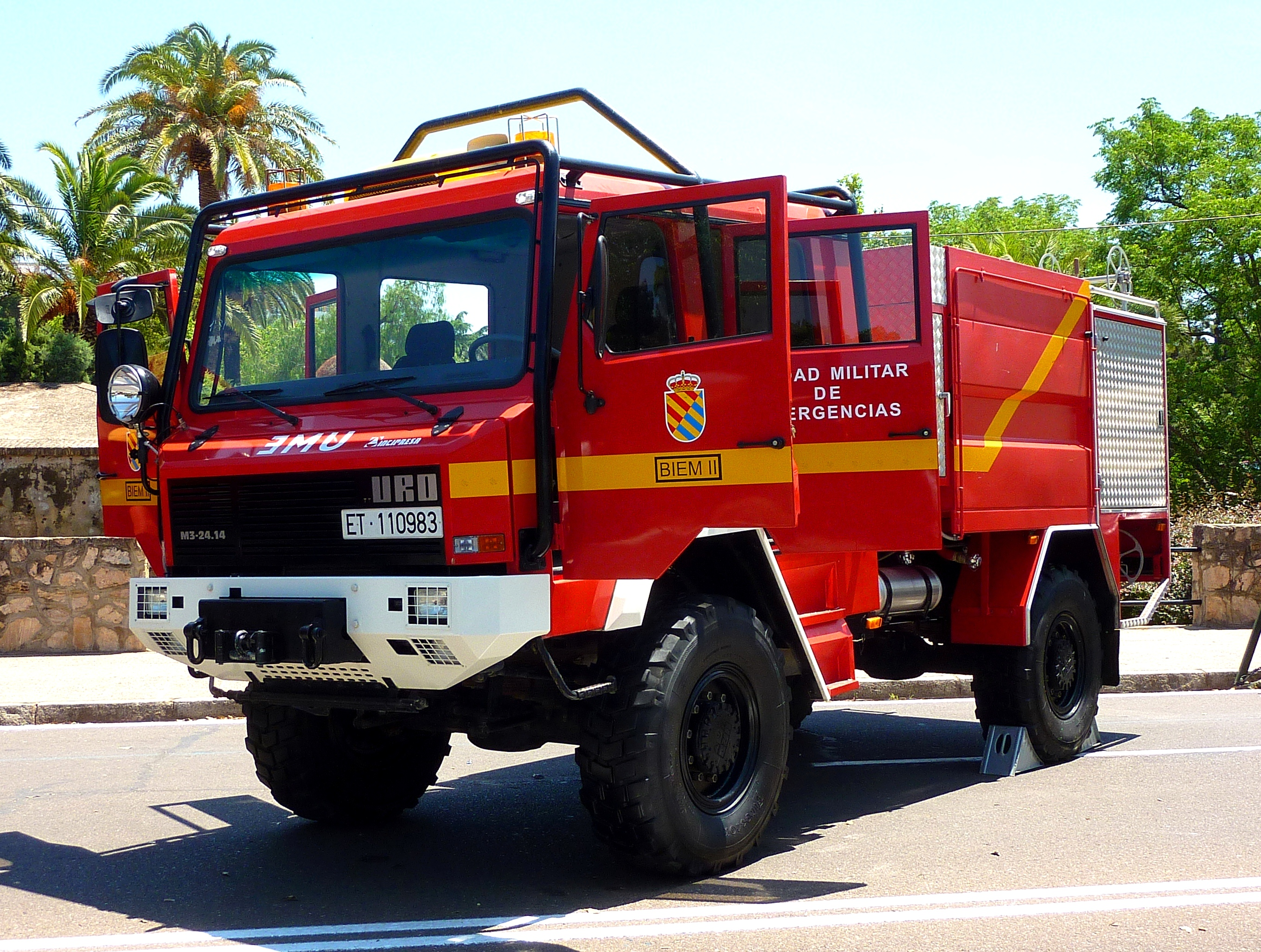
URO M3-24.14 of the UME.

Uro (Both Galician and Spanish for "aurochs") is a Spanish brand of all-wheel-drive and military trucks, based in Santiago de Compostela, Galicia.

The Uro parent company, Urovesa, was started in 1981 by a group of ex-IPV employees. They quickly established themselves as a leading player in the 4x4 rural fire-fighting and construction Spanish truck markets.

From 1984 on, they became certified provider of the Spanish Army, which currently operates more of two thousand of Uro vehicles, including the well-known URO VAMTAC (Vehículo de Alta Movilidad Táctico / High Mobility Tactical Vehicle), equipped with a 190 hp Steyr diesel engine, while most of the other Uro ranges feature Iveco engines.

The Spanish Army Uro VAMTACs have been instrumental in the performance of Spanish forces in international interventions in Afghanistan, Iraq and Lebanon. The Royal Moroccan Army (FAR) has ordered 1200 VAMTACs as well as 800 Iveco trucks. The deal is worth 200 million euros.

Since 1991, an Urovesa subsidiary, Uromac, produces in Castropol (Spain) small dumpers and off-road forklifts, also used by the Spanish Army.

== Current Models ==
- Vamtac
- Vam-TL
- Trucks F3 (civil version) and M3 (military version)
