= PPV =

PPV, ppv or pPv may refer to:

== Technology ==
- Pay-per-view on cable or satellite television
- People Powered Vehicle, a human-powered vehicle from 1970
- Police Pursuit Vehicles, the most common police vehicles in the United States and Canada

== Science and mathematics ==
- Pars plana vitrectomy, a common ocular surgery procedure
- Parts per volume, a unit of volume mixing ratio
- Plum pox virus, a plant virus
- Pneumococcal polysaccharide vaccine, a pneumococcal vaccine
- Poly(p-phenylene vinylene), a conjugated polymer
- Porcine parvovirus, a virus causing reproductive failure of swine
- Positive predictive value in statistics
- Post-perovskite (pPv), in geophysics
- Processus vaginalis or patent processus vaginalis
- Pusat Pemberian Vaksin, or vaccination centres in Malaysia

== Other uses ==
- Pajamäen Pallo-Veikot, a football team in western Helsinki, Finland
- Price variance, or purchase price variance, in accounting
- Public/Private Ventures, a former nonprofit social research and policy organization
- Port Protection Seaplane Base, IATA code
