= Starstreak =

British man-portable/vehicle mounted surface-to-air missile

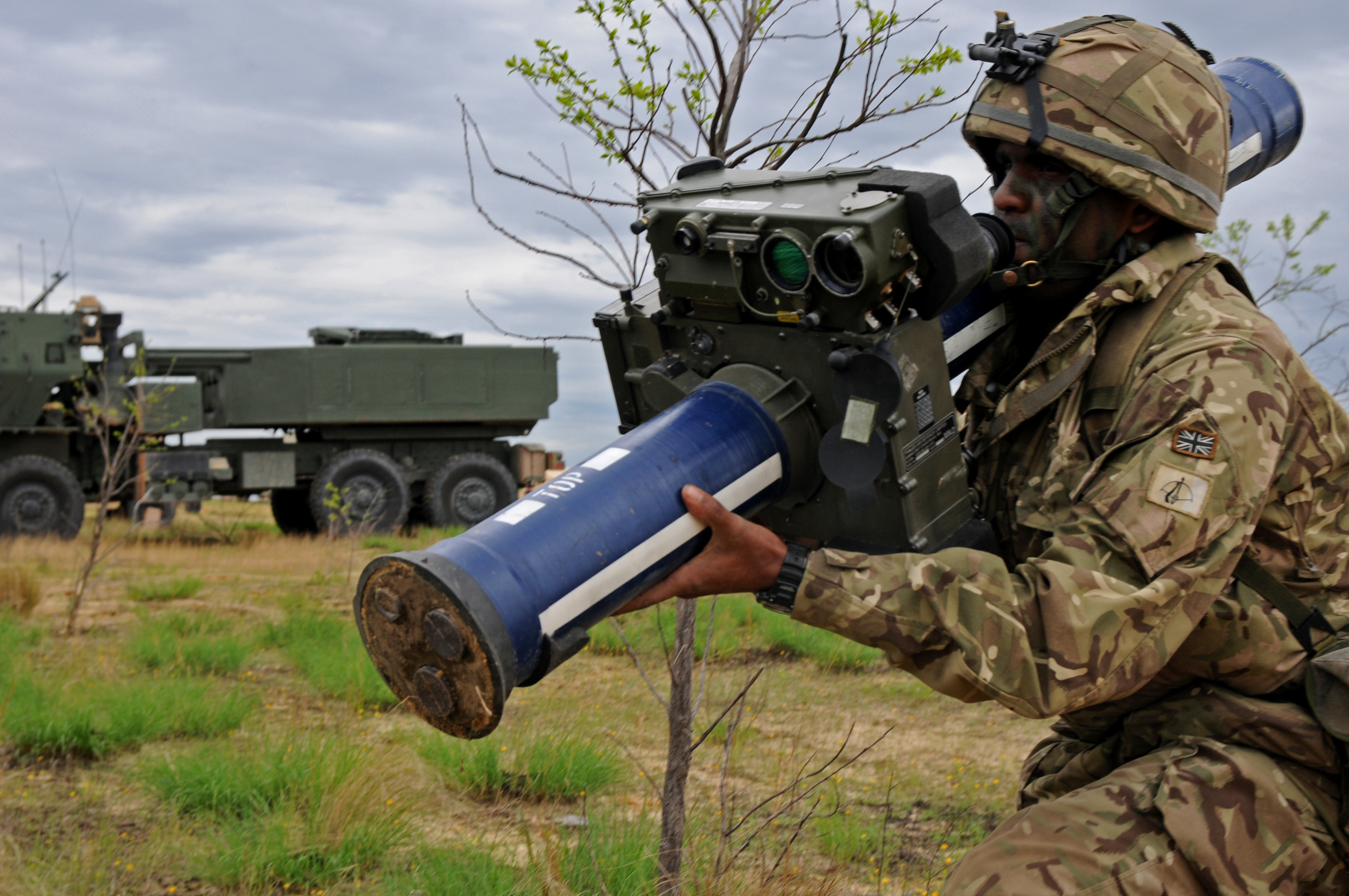
- A British Royal Artillery soldier protects an airfield with a man-portable Starstreak HVM system
- Type: Man-portable/Vehicle-mounted surface-to-air missile
- Place of origin: United Kingdom

Service history
- In service: 1997–present
- Used by: See § Operators
- Wars: Russo-Ukrainian War

Production history
- Designed: 1980s
- Manufacturer: Thales Air Defence
- Produced: November 1986
- No. built: 7,000
- Variants: See § Variants

Specifications (Starstreak High Velocity Missile)
- Mass: 14 kg (31 lb)
- Length: 1.397 m (4 ft 7 in)
- Diameter: 13 cm (5.1 in)
- Effective firing range: Starstreak: 0.3–7 km (0.186–4.35 mi); Starstreak-II: >7 km (4.35 mi)
- Warhead: Three explosive sub-munitions - 'Darts'
- Warhead weight: Three 0.9 kg (2.0 lb) Tungsten-alloy Darts, 450 g (16 oz) PBX-98 per Dart
- Detonation mechanism: Impact delay
- Engine: First stage: Royal Ordnance 'Brambling' cast double-based propellant blip rocket motor Second stage: Royal Ordnance 'Titus' cast double-based propellant
- Flight ceiling: 7 km (22,966 ft)
- Maximum speed: >Mach 3 (2,301 mph)
- Guidance system: SACLOS, Laser-beam guidance

Starstreak is a British short-range surface-to-air missile that can be used as a man-portable air-defence system (MANPADS) or used in heavier systems. It is manufactured by Thales Air Defence (formerly Shorts Missile Systems) in Belfast, Northern Ireland. It is also known as Starstreak HVM (High Velocity Missile). After launch, the missile accelerates to more than Mach 4, making it the fastest short-range surface-to-air missile in existence. It then launches three laser beam-riding submunitions, increasing the likelihood of a successful hit on the target. Starstreak has been in service with the British Army since 1997. In 2012 Thales relaunched the system as ForceSHIELD.

== Development ==
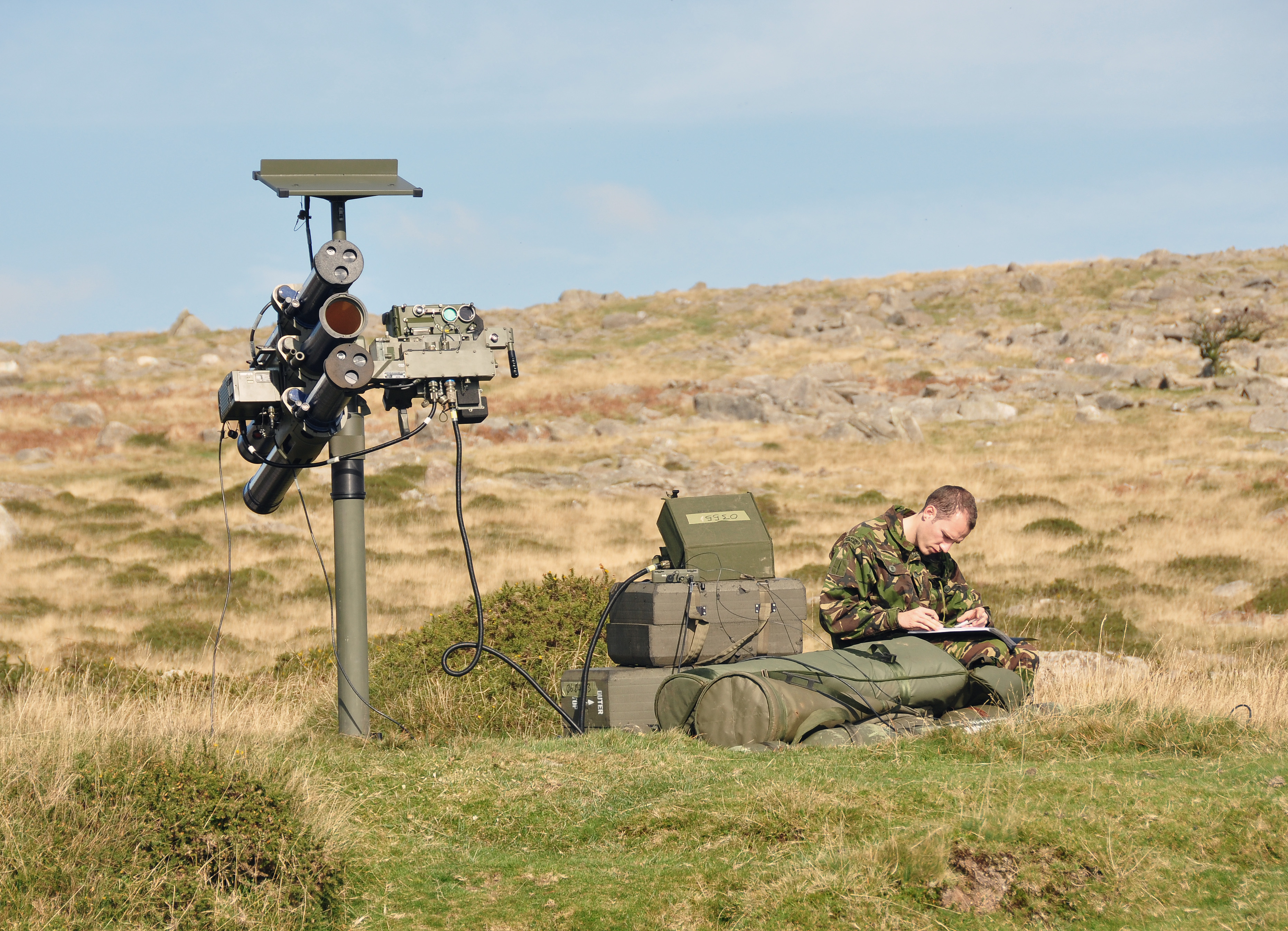
Starstreak LML emplacement used in training on Dartmoor, England; one of the three missiles has been fired

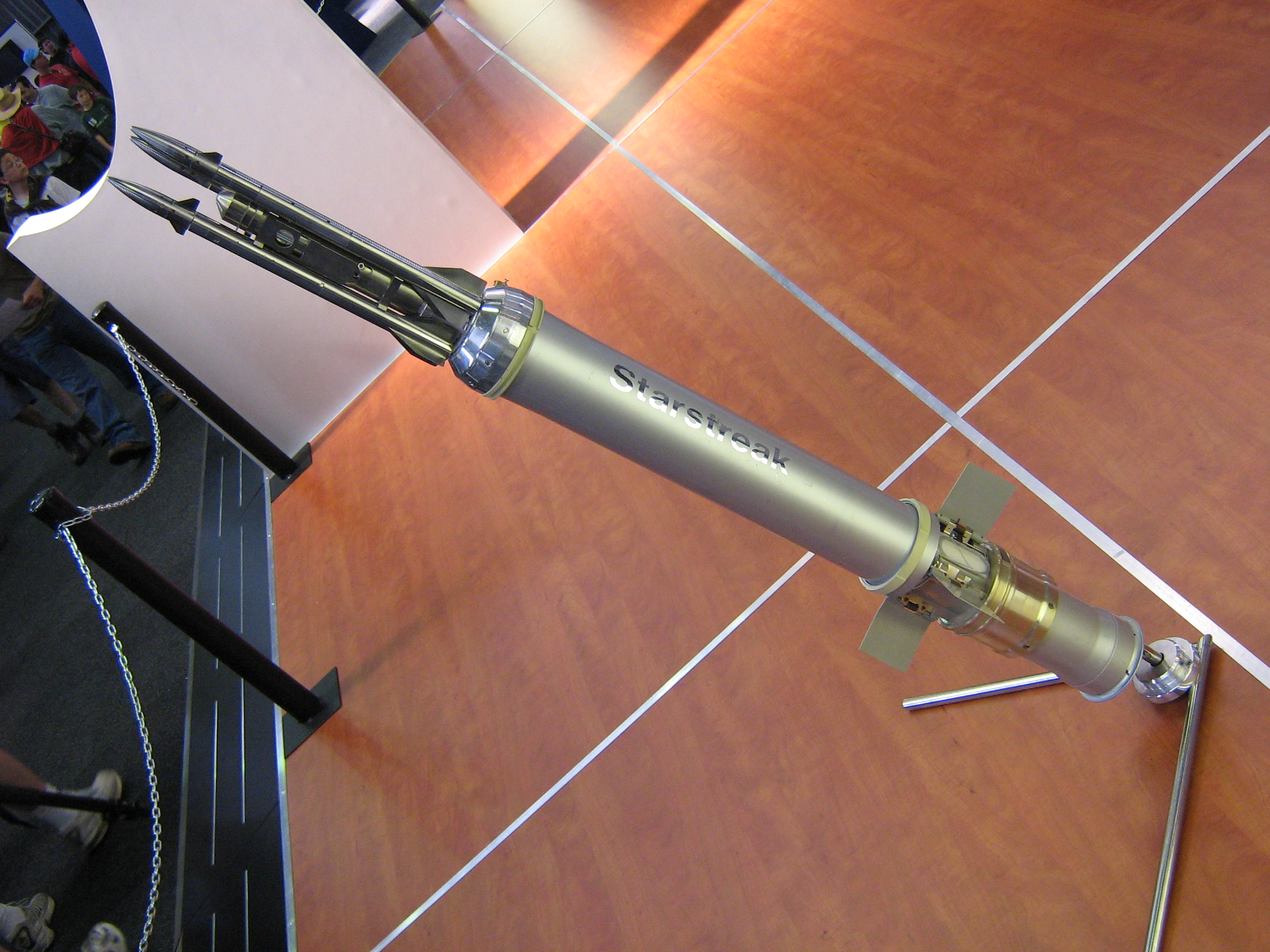
Starstreak missile on display at the Africa Aerospace and Defence Expo, September 2006

Development on the missile began in the early 1980s after an evaluation of missile and gun options to increase air defence capabilities showed that a high-velocity missile system would best meet the needs and could also replace existing shoulder-launched missiles. A General Staff Requirement (GSR 3979) was drawn up with the requirements of the system, specifying the requirement of three launch platforms for the missile:

- A self-propelled launcher.
- A three-round lightweight launcher.
- A man-portable launcher.

In 1984, the British Ministry of Defence awarded development contracts to British Aerospace (BAe) and Shorts Missile Systems; the BAe missile was known as Thunderbolt HVM. Shorts won the competition and were awarded £356 million. Further development and a production contract materialized in November 1986, and the missile was officially accepted into service in September 1997. The missile was intended to replace the Javelin surface-to-air missile in British service. The LML and shoulder-launched versions have been in use since 2000.

In July 2001, Thales received a contract for a successor identification friend or foe system for Starstreak.

In mid-2007, Thales UK in Northern Ireland revealed that it had developed Starstreak II, a much improved successor to the Starstreak missile. Some of the advantages of the new version are increased range of 7 km (4.3 mi), improved lethality, an improved targeting system, and much higher operating ceiling.

In 2011, when it won a contract for the Lightweight Multirole Missile (LMM), Thales announced it had agreed with the Ministry of Defence to "re-role previously contracted budgets to facilitate the full-scale development, series production and introduction of the LMM." The contract affected is speculated to have been Starstreak.

== Description ==
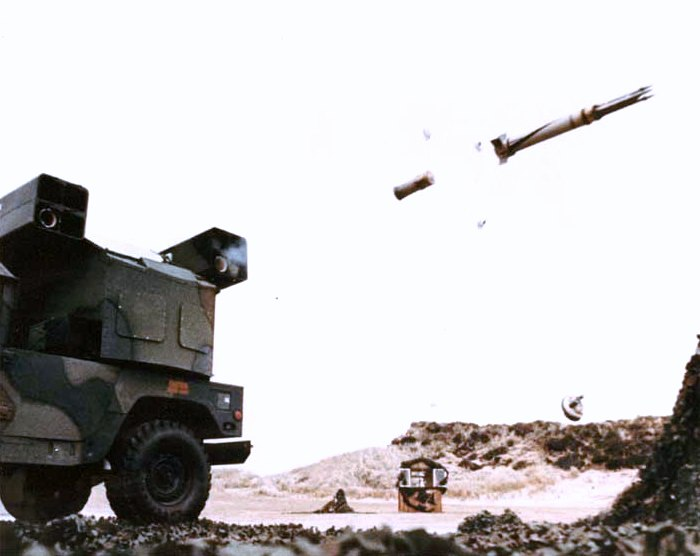
A Starstreak, just after being launched from an AN/TWQ-1 Avenger mobile, short-range air-defence platform

When used in the light or MANPADS role, the Starstreak missile is transported in a sealed launch tube. This tube is attached to an aiming unit for firing. The operator tracks the target using the aiming unit's optically stabilized sight. The process of tracking the target allows the aiming unit to compute the right trajectory to bring the missile together with the target. The operator can indicate wind direction to the unit and, in the case of a long-range target, provide superelevation. When the initial tracking is complete, the operator fires the missile by pressing a button.

The missile then fires the first-stage rocket motor; this launches the missile from the tube but burns out before leaving the tube to protect the operator. Four metres (thirteen feet) away from the operator, when the missile is at a safe distance, the second stage fires. This rapidly accelerates the missile to a burn-out velocity exceeding Mach 3. As the second stage burns out, three dart sub-munitions are released.

The dart housing is made from a tungsten alloy. The darts are each 396 millimetres (15.6 in) long, 22 millimetres (0.87 in) in diameter, and about 900 grams (32 oz) in mass. Around half the weight of each dart – approximately 450 g (16 oz) – is its explosive charge, detonated by a delayed-action, impact-activated fuze. Each dart consists of a rotating fore-body, with two canard fins, attached to a non-rotating rear assembly with four fins. The rear assembly of each dart also houses the guidance electronics including a rearwards facing sensor.

The darts do not home in on laser energy reflected from the target; instead, the aiming unit projects two laser beams which paint a two-dimensional matrix upon the target. The lasers are modulated, and by examining these modulations the sub-munitions sensor can determine the dart's location within the matrix. The dart is then steered to keep it in the centre of the matrix. The sub-munitions steer by briefly decelerating the rotating fore-body with a clutch. The front wings then steer the missile in the appropriate direction. The three sub-munitions fly in a formation about 1.5 metres (4.9 ft) in radius, and have enough kinetic energy to manoeuvre to meet a target evading at 9 g at 7,000 metres (23,000 ft) altitude.

Earlier laser guidance systems used a single beam that had to be kept on the target at all times, the missile homing in on laser energy reflected off the target; if it moved off the target, the reflection would end and guidance would be lost until the target was regained. This problem could be reduced by making the laser's beam wider, but at the cost of reduced accuracy and reflected energy. Starstreak's system allows for the beam area to be much larger than the target while retaining pinpoint accuracy.

On impact with the target a delayed-action fuze is triggered, allowing the projectile to penetrate the target before the explosive warhead detonates. The tungsten housing is designed to fragment and maximise damage inside the target.

In September 1999, the missile was demonstrated against an FV432 armoured personnel carrier, illustrating the missile's effectiveness as a surface-to-surface weapon. Each sub-munition dart travelling at 4,500 kilometres per hour (2,800 mph) has comparable kinetic energy to a shell from a Bofors 40 mm gun, though it lacks the armour-penetration capabilities of a purpose-built anti-tank guided missile or a dual-purpose missile (such as the Air Defence Anti-Tank System).

=== Advantages ===
Starstreak has a number of advantages over infrared homing guided, radar homing guided, and radio command guidance MCLOS/SACLOS (e.g. Blowpipe or Javelin) missiles:

- It cannot be fooled by infrared countermeasures or radar/radio countermeasures.
- It has no radar emission for anti-radar missiles to lock onto, and as it does not rely on radar, it cannot be jammed with radar jamming.

=== Disadvantages ===
- Because the weapon is guided by a laser, if the target possesses laser warning systems it is much harder to avoid detection. However, as it is a beam-riding laser-guided weapon, this is less severe of a problem than a semi-active laser homing weapon.
- As the missile itself does not seek out a target, the shooter must remain on target and stationary until impact. An enemy that spots the launch smoke/flare of a Starstreak launch or is warned by a Missile Approach Warning System may be able to return fire, shaking the operator's aim or even killing the operator.
- Because the system uses a single guidance system, only one missile can be guided at a time, unlike some radar and all infrared missiles.

== Service history ==
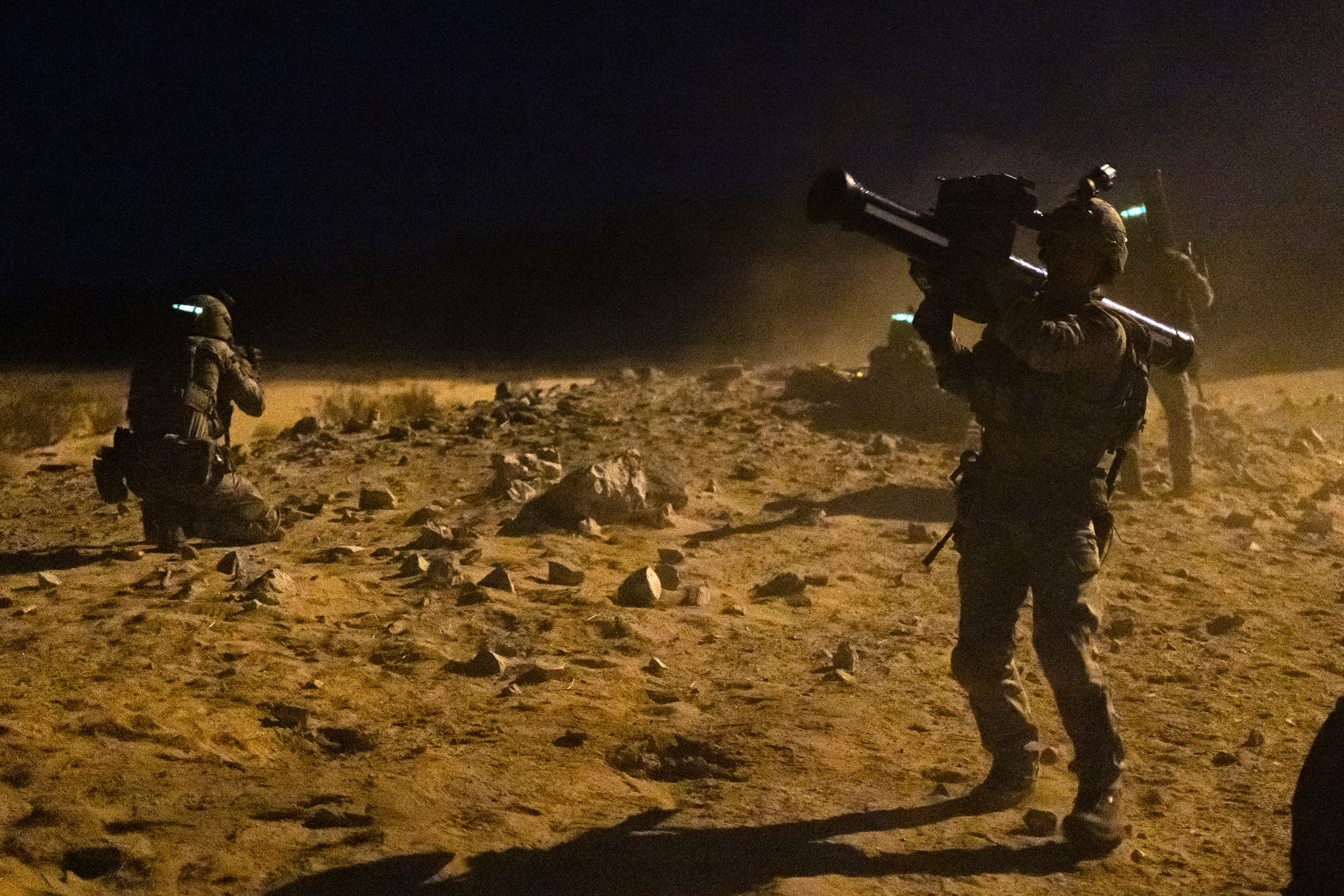
A shoulder-launched Starstreak carried by a Royal Marine on exercise in 2021

The missile was brought into service with 12th Regiment Royal Artillery and 47th Regiment Royal Artillery in 1997 as part of the High Velocity Missile (HVM) system equipped with both the Air Defence Acquisition Device (ADAD) and a ×60 thermal sight. Each regiment was equipped with 108 HVM self-propelled armoured launchers mounted on the Stormer tracked chassis capable of holding eight missiles ready to fire and a further eight reloads (the original capacity of twelve was reduced during a revision). The launchers could originally run on batteries for extended periods to minimise their signature, but significant upgrades dramatically increased the system's power requirements. A light-role variant known as HVM Lightweight Multi Launch (LML), capable of holding three ready-to-fire missiles, was also brought into service with the Air Defence Troop Royal Marines and a Royal Artillery Air Assault Battery attached to 16 Air Assault Brigade. The systems' armoured variant, the HVM Self Propelled (Stormer), saw service during the Second Gulf War but did not fire. The British Army currently uses the A5 fifth-generation missile, significantly improved from the original missile. The HVM SP and LML variants now carry a mix of both Starstreak A5 and Lightweight Multirole Missiles.

In 2012 HVM LML light role detachments equipped with Starstreak A4 missiles were emplaced on top of several blocks of flats in London to provide air defence for the 2012 London Olympics. In 2013, the British MoD ordered 200 more Starstreak missiles.

On 16 March 2022, following the Russian invasion of Ukraine, Defence Secretary Ben Wallace announced that the UK would supply Ukraine with Starstreak missiles to help prevent Russian air supremacy. British soldiers trained Ukrainian forces to use the system. HVM SPs were also deployed to Poland as an interim measure until the arrival of Sky Sabre. In April 2022, Starstreak missiles were in use by Ukrainian soldiers, and it was reported that Ukrainian forces appeared to have successfully used the system to shoot down a Russian Mi-28N attack helicopter. The missile, according to footage released by the UK MoD, hit with all three projectiles, splitting the helicopter in half. In April 2022, the UK announced it would be providing Alvis Stormer vehicles armed with Starstreak. By June 2023, the system had been used to shoot down multiple Russian drones.

The British Army deployed Starstreak missiles to assist with the security of the 2024 Summer Olympics in Paris.

== Variants ==
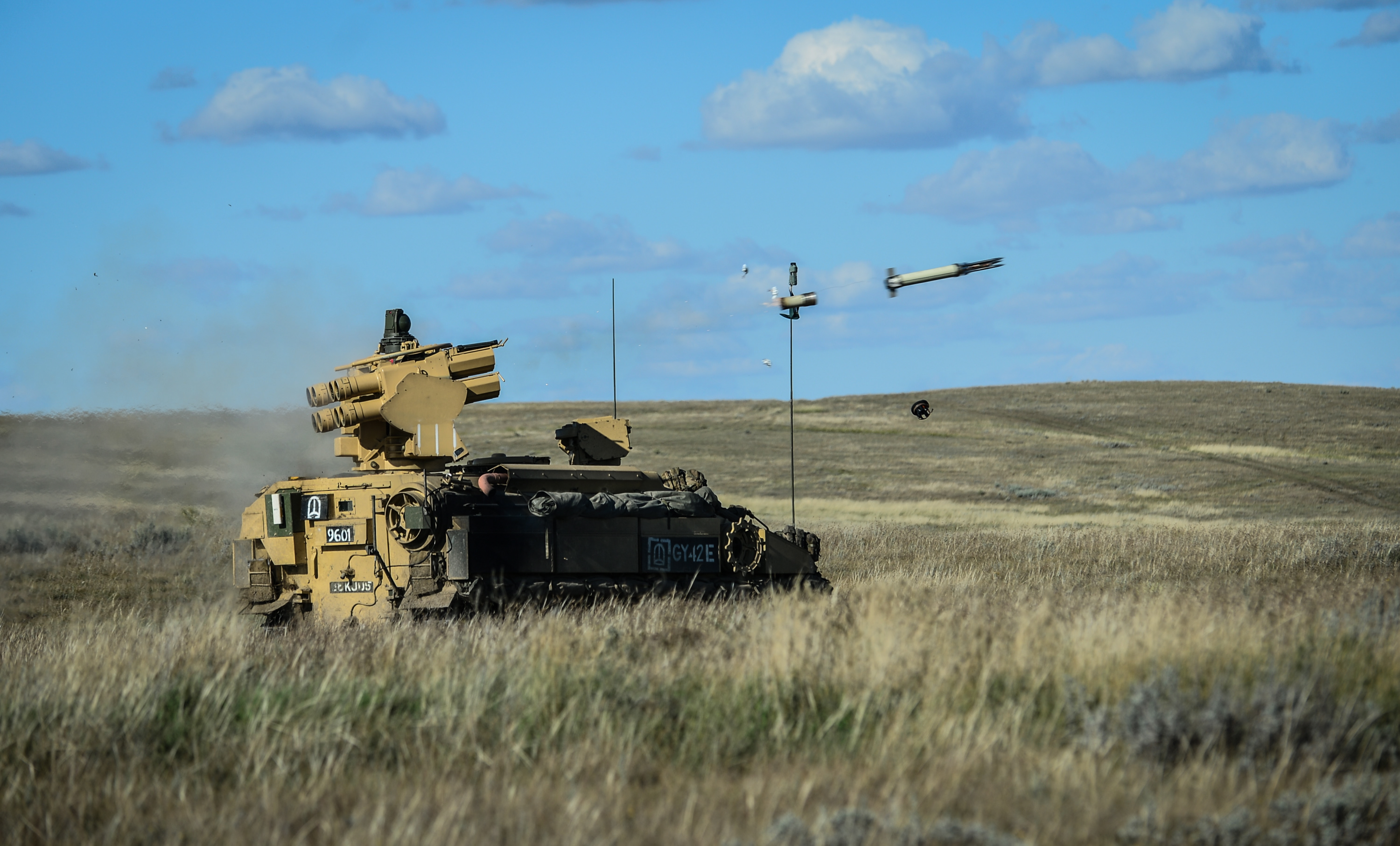
Alvis Stormer (HVM SP) firing Starstreak in 2014

- ATASK (Air To Air Starstreak): Fired from a helicopter. This was developed in combination with McDonnell-Douglas and Lockheed Martin electronics between 1995 and 1998 specifically for use with the AH-64 Apache. It has yet to enter service.
- LML: Fired from a Lightweight Multiple Launcher (LML) that holds three missiles ready for firing and can be used as either a stationary launch unit or mounted on a light vehicle such as a Land Rover or HMMWV (Humvee). The LML originated in a proposal under the Army Suggestions Scheme for the Javelin system.
- Seastreak: Two versions of a naval mounting have been demonstrated—a one-man mount similar to the LML but carrying a total of six missiles, and a close in weapon system mounting holding 24 missiles.
- Self-propelled (SP) HVM: Carried on an Alvis Stormer AFV with a roof-mounted eight-round launcher with internal storage for a further 8 missiles. This is the most common variant.
- Starstreak Avenger: Built to a U.S. Army requirement in the early 1990s, this system integrated the Starstreak missile on the Boeing Avenger vehicle, replacing 1 pod of Stinger missiles with 1 pod of 4 Starstreaks and modifying the fire control system accordingly.
- Starstreak Mark II: Upgrade to the Starstreak.
- THOR/Multi Mission System (MMS): A four-missile turret mounted on a Pinzgauer (6×6) cross-country chassis, launched by Thales UK in 2005.
- RapidRanger MMS weapon launcher on URO VAMTAC vehicle

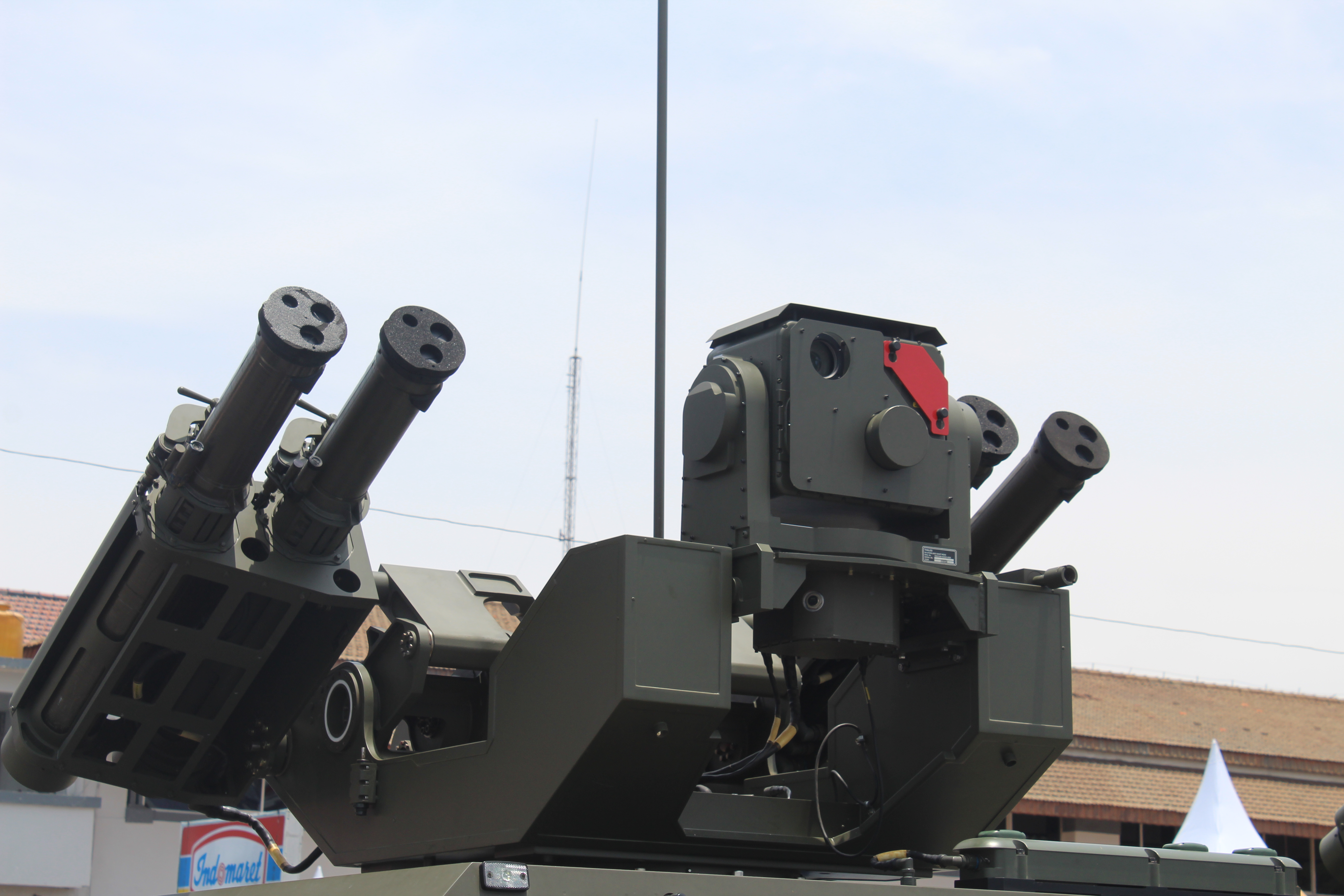
Indonesian Army Starstreak RapidRanger on URO Vamtac ST5

- Man-portable shoulder launcher

== Operators ==
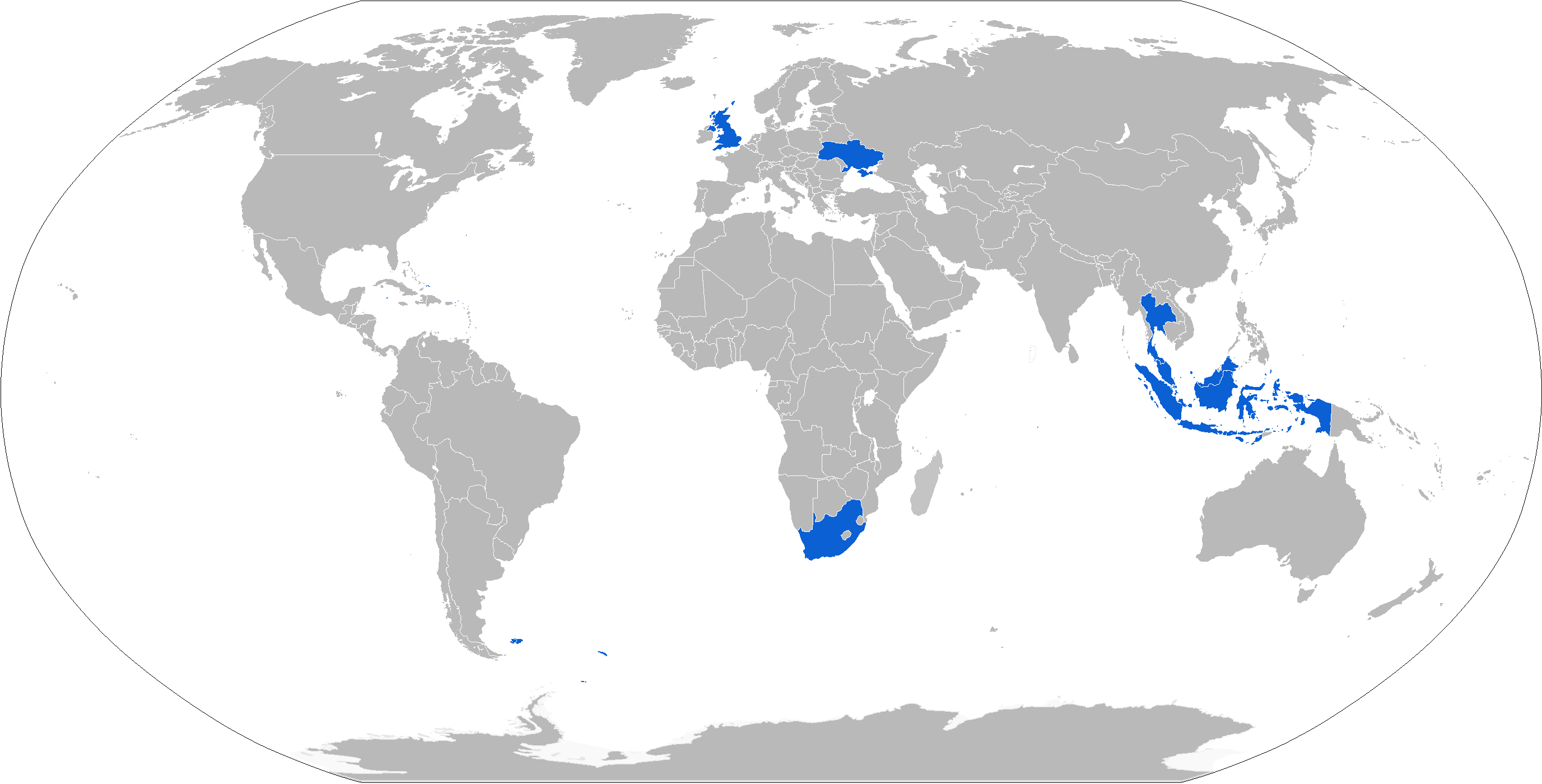
Map with Starstreak operators in blue

United Kingdom
- HVM SP – Approx 40 systems for a front line establishment of 36 (156 originally purchased)
- HVM LML – Approx 16 systems
- UK MoD plans to procure 12 Rapid Ranger quadruple launch systems on URO VAMTAC ST5 vehicles to replace 6 HVM SP donated to Ukraine.
South Africa
- LML – 8 LML launcher systems. Stockholm International Peace Research Institute trade registers list the number of Portable SAMs delivered as 96 with another order for 82
Thailand
- Royal Thai Army – Ordered in 2012
Indonesia
- Indonesian Army – First order was in November 2011, followed by a second but no deliveries were made and the contract was renegotiated in January 2014 to equip five batteries of ForceShield system with Starstreak missiles, ControlMaster200 radars and weapon coordination systems, lightweight multiple launchers on Land Rover Defenders and RapidRanger weapon launchers on URO VAMTAC vehicles, at a cost of over £100m. In 2022, PT. LEN stated that 9 battery already operational out of 10 battery ordered.
Malaysia
- Malaysian Armed Forces – Ordered an undisclosed number of LML and vehicle-based variants in July 2015. In used with the ForceSHIELD defense system. Will replace the Starburst.
Ukraine
- Armed Forces of Ukraine – Deliveries were announced in March 2022 as part of UK military aid during the Russo-Ukrainian War. The number of systems donated is reported to be 6. Each missile's cost is estimated at £100,000 to £130,000.

=== Future Operators ===
Portugal

• Portuguese Armed Forces — In 2024, a new air defence modernisation programme funded the acquisition of 3 URO VAMTAC Rapid Ranger launch units alongside HVM, LMM and a Ground Master 200 radar to initially form 1 air defence battery. The Army's Chief of Staff stated further procurements will be necessary and foresees the need to acquire 3 additional batteries with 9 more fire units between them.

India

- Indian Army — On 13 January 2021, Thales and Bharat Dynamics Limited (BDL) signed a teaming agreement to collaborate on STARStreak Air Defence system in India. In June 2024, they were awarded the contract through a Request for Information (RFI) of the Indian Army to supply an undisclosed quantity of vehicle-mounted and man portable systems in order to fulfil its urgent short-range air defense requirement. On 10 February 2025, Thales and BDL signed an agreement for initial deliveries of the Laser Beam Riding MANPAD (LBRM) Very Short Range Air Defence (VSHORAD) Missiles. The deliveries are expected to begin from 2025 with up to 60% indigenous content.

== See also ==
- Martlet (Lightweight Multirole Missile) – multi-role missile based on Starstreak and using same launch tube.
- Fireflash, a missile from the 1950s that used a similar configuration of an unpowered, guided munition that receives an initial acceleration from booster rockets
- Similar missiles include:
  - Strela-2 – (Soviet Union)
  - Strela-3 – (Soviet Union)
  - Igla – (Soviet Union)
  - Stinger – (United States)
  - Sungur (Turkey) – (Turkey)
  - Anza (missile) – (Pakistan)
  - Blowpipe – (United Kingdom)
  - Javelin – (United Kingdom)
  - Mistral – (France)
  - VSHORAD (India) – (India)
  - KP-SAM Shingung – (South Korea)
  - RBS 70 – (Sweden)
