= Internet Protocol Version =

Internet Protocol Version or IPV is a version of the Internet Protocol that can be one of the following:

- Internet Protocol version 4
- Internet Protocol version 6

These are called IP addresses and are made up of binary values. The Internet Protocol Version 4 runs at 32 bits long, while the Internet Protocol Version 6 runs at 128 bits long.
