= Price variance =

Price variance (Vmp) is a term used in cost accounting which denotes the difference between the expected cost of an item (standard cost) and the actual cost at the time of purchase. The price of an item is often affected by the quantity of items ordered, and this is taken into consideration. A price variance means that actual costs may exceed the budgeted cost, which is generally not desirable. This is important when companies are deciding what quantities of an item to purchase.

== Formula ==
Price variance is calculated by the following formula:

Vmp = (Actual unit cost - Standard unit cost) * Actual Quantity Purchased
or
Vmp = (Actual Quantity Purchased * Actual Unit Cost) - (Actual Quantity Purchased * Standard Unit Cost).

When the Actual Materials Price is higher than the Standard Materials Price, the variance is said to be unfavorable, since the Actual price paid on materials purchased is greater than the allowed standard. The variance is said to be favorable when the Standard materials Price is higher than the Actual Materials Price, since less money was spent in purchasing the materials than the allowed standard.
