= URO VAMTAC =

URO VAMTAC ST5
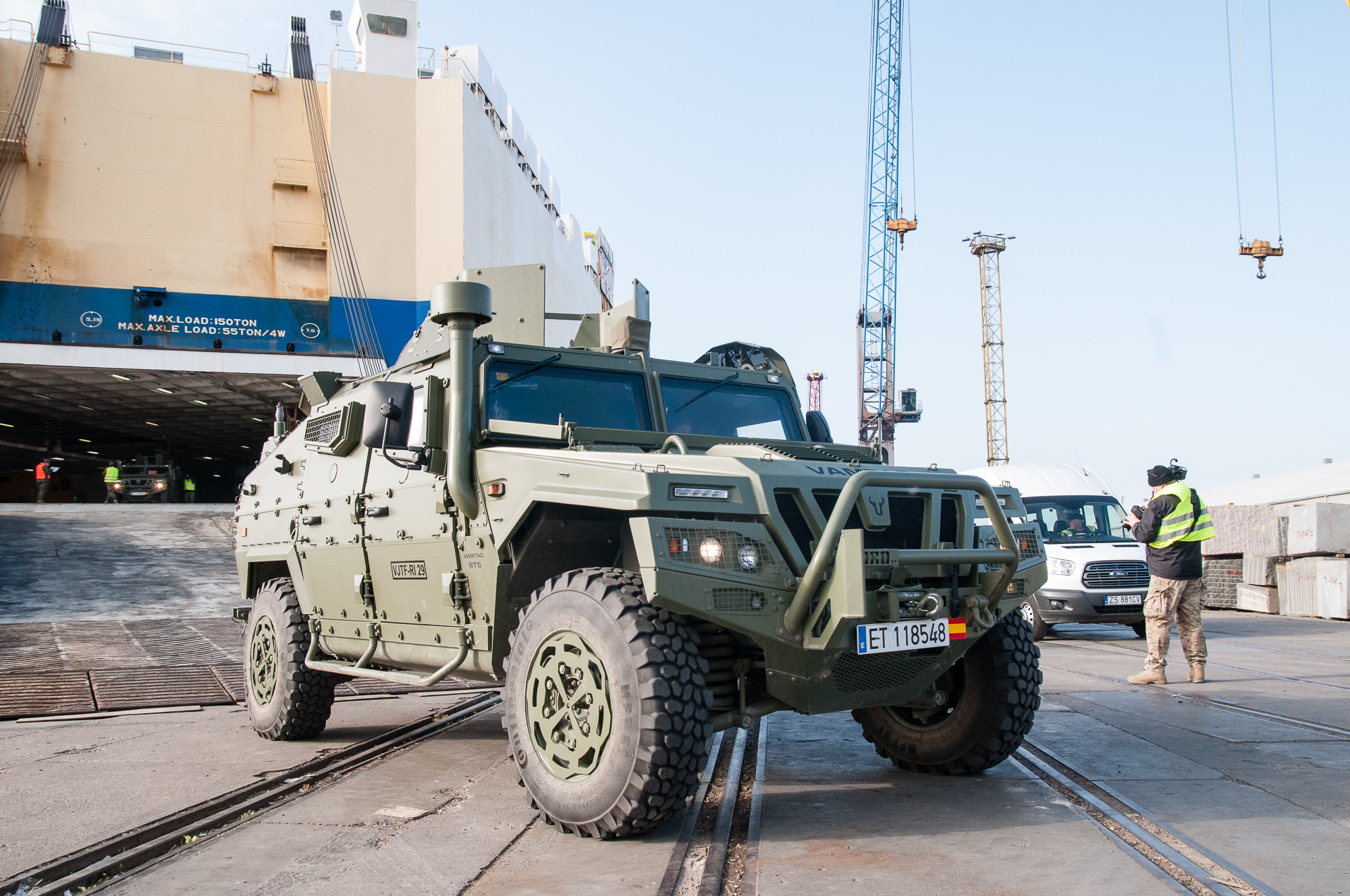
- Spanish Army's URO VAMTAC ST5
- Type: Multi-purpose armored vehicle
- Place of origin: Spain

Service history
- In service: 1998–present
- Used by: See operators

Production history
- Designer: UROVESA
- Manufacturer: UROVESA
- No. built: at least 4,500
- Variants: VAMTAC I3, S3, and ST5

Specifications
- Length: 4.845 metres (15.90 ft) / 5.55 metres (18.2 ft)
- Width: 2.175 metres (7 ft 1.6 in)
- Height: 1.9 metres (6 ft 3 in)
- Crew: 1+3
- Engine: Steyr 6.7L 6-cylinder turbocharged diesel 245 HP
- Payload capacity: 1500–2000 kg
- Transmission: 6 speed automatic
- Suspension: 4-wheel independent (double wishbones with coil-springs)
- Fuel capacity: 110 litres (24 imp gal; 29 US gal)
- Operational range: >600 kilometres (370 mi)
- Maximum speed: 135 kilometres per hour (84 mph)

The URO VAMTAC (Vehículo de Alta Movilidad Táctico, "High Mobility Tactical Vehicle") is a Spanish four-wheel drive military vehicle manufactured by UROVESA. Externally it is similar in appearance and design to the Humvee of the United States Military due to similar requirements. More than 2,000 of the vehicles have been delivered to the Spanish Armed Forces. Several other countries operate the VAMTAC as well, and it has seen in service most recently in Afghanistan and Syria. The vehicle comes in three models, named I3, S3 and ST5, and has several configurations.

== Development ==
The URO VAMTAC was developed by the Spanish company URO, Vehiculos Especiales S.A. so that it would meet the requirements of the Spanish military for a multipurpose, air-portable, high mobility off-road vehicle with good payload capacity.

Just as the HMMWV entered production in 1984 the Spanish army started to think of purchasing their own multirole vehicle that would replace Land Rovers.

VAMTAC concept did not materialize until 1995 when a competition was held for a next-generation tactical vehicle. The American HMMWV was also a natural candidate for several reasons. UROVESA decided to design a vehicle that could exceed the US design.

After the vehicle was tested by the Spanish Ministry of Defence, UROVESA received a five-year contract and the URO VAMTAC was produced from 1998 to 2003. In October 2005, the Ministry of Defence awarded a new five-year contract for the URO VAMTAC after a three-month trial period. This also introduced some changes, and the two models of the vehicle which were named T3 and T5, were re-designated as I3 and S3 respectively. The URO VAMTAC is similar in appearance and design to the U.S. Military's Humvee, because both vehicles were designed to meet similar requirements and specifications.

== Operational history ==
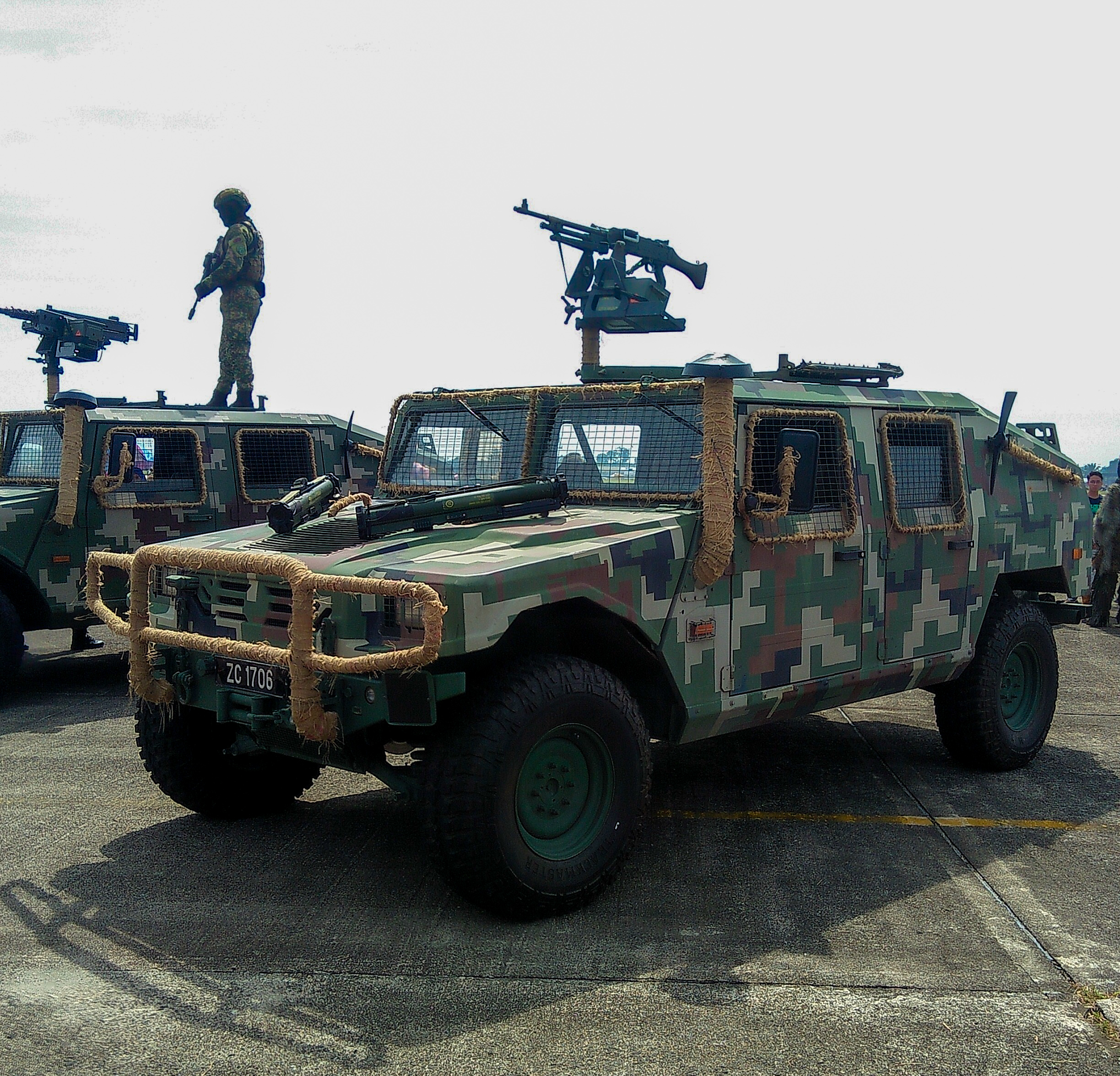
URO VAMTAC of Malaysian Army in digital camouflage

Approximately 1,200 units were delivered to the Spanish military under the initial contract from 1998. Roughly 60 percent of these were of the T5 model (later S3), and the rest were T3 (later I3). By late 2009, around 900 more units had been delivered under the second contract, bringing the total procured by Spanish forces to approximately 2,100 vehicles. All the vehicles delivered under the second contract have been of the S3 model. The military has equipped about 25 percent of the vehicles received under the initial contract with ballistic kits, increasing their armour. URO VAMTACs have been used by the Spanish National Police as well.

In April 2013, the Vamtac was selected as the chosen vehicle for all branches of the Spanish armed forces. This means they will replace HMMWVs used by Spanish Marines. A total of 772 vehicles were to be acquired over a 5-year period.

The Spanish military has used the URO VAMTAC in Afghanistan, as well in Congo and Lebanon. Several other countries use this vehicle.

All in all, according to a 2017 estimate, some 4,500 units are in service in more than 20 countries and so far in 50 different configurations.

== Features and characteristics ==
The URO VAMTAC comes with four-wheel drive capability, and is available in three primary configurations – command and control, chassis-cab, and pick-up. The first comes with a four-door cab. The latter two versions are available with three cab types: two-door, four-door, or a four-door version with smaller rear doors and less cab space. Shelter type or cargo bodies such as hardtops can be added to the rear compartment, as well as weapons. It can accommodate a wide range of weapons including machine guns, grenade launchers, anti-tank missiles, 81 mm mortars, M40 recoilless rifles and light air defence missiles.

The vehicle has a length of 4.845 metres (15.90 ft) width of 2.175 metres (7 ft 1.6 in) and a height of 1.9 metres (6 ft 3 in). The curb weight of the vehicle ranges from 3,000 kilograms (6,600 lb) to 3,500 kilograms (7,700 lb), and has a payload capacity ranging from 1,500 kilograms (3,300 lb) to 2,000 kilograms (4,400 lb). Both these specifications vary depending on the version. The URO VAMTAC has a range of more than 600 kilometres (370 mi), and can negotiate 70% gradients and 50% side slopes. It is powered by Steyr Motors' M16-"Monoblock" engine (6-cylinder, turbocharged diesel engine, 135 kW (181 hp; 184 PS)) coupled with a five speed automatic transmission. The I3 uses a 166 metric horsepower (122 kW; 164 hp) engine, while the S3 is equipped with a 188 metric horsepower (138 kW; 185 hp) one.

== Versions ==
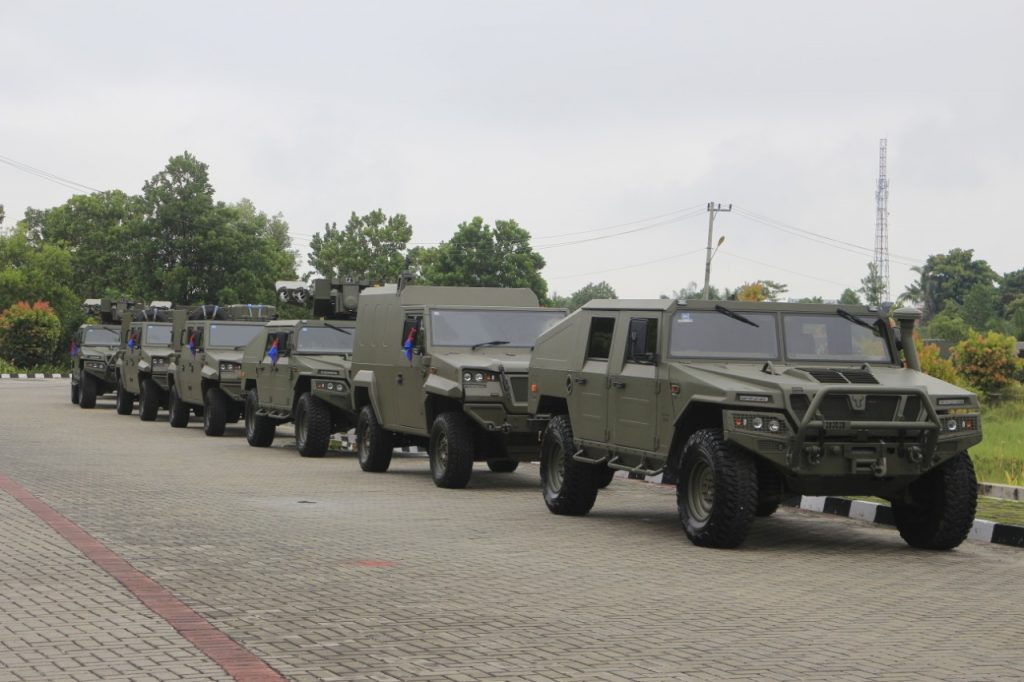
A line of Indonesian Army URO VAMTAC ST5 & LTV for Starstreak missile system

The URO VAMTAC has been evolved in several versions:

- URO VAMTAC Rebeco (1998–2003)
- URO VAMTAC I3 (initially designed URO VAMTAC T3) (2004–2010)
- URO VAMTAC S3 (initially T5) (2004–2010)
- URO VAMTAC S3 ARMORED (2004–2010)
- URO VAMTAC ST5 (since 2013)
- URO VAMTAC ST5 BN3 (STANAG armor level 3) (since 2015)
- URO VAMTAC SK95 (light artillery tractor on a ST5 chassis) (since 2018)
- URO VAMTAC LTV (Light Tactical Vehicle) (2018)

== Variants ==
VAMTAC is available in many different versions with different body types. Most popular variants are pick-up, command/control and chassis-cab. The chassis-cab variant can mount different types of shelters or cargo compartments.

There are several specialized variants of the URO VAMTAC according to the armament and configuration used. Several support variants have been produced with capabilities for towing, firefighting and resupplying. Notable variants include:

- Ambulance vehicle with accommodation for two or four stretchers in the rear compartment.
- Anti-tank vehicle equipped with either BGM-71 TOW or MILAN guided missiles. Currently Spain is installing its Spike missiles in these vehicles.
- Anti-aircraft vehicle equipped with Mistral surface-to-air missiles. Currently Malaysia have installed Starstreak missiles and 9K38 Igla missiles on their vehicles. Indonesian Army variant are equipped with Starstreak missiles.
- Artillery vehicle equipped with Type 63 multiple rocket launchers and M-63 Plamens.
- Command and communications vehicle, with separate compartment in rear section to accommodate communications equipment. This versión has four-doors, cargo space and communication masts fitted on the corners of the shelter.
- PSYOPS vehicle, equipped with loudspeaker arrays.
- Fast Attack vehicle, designed for Special Forces and equipped for long range reconnaissance and infiltration missions.

== Operators ==
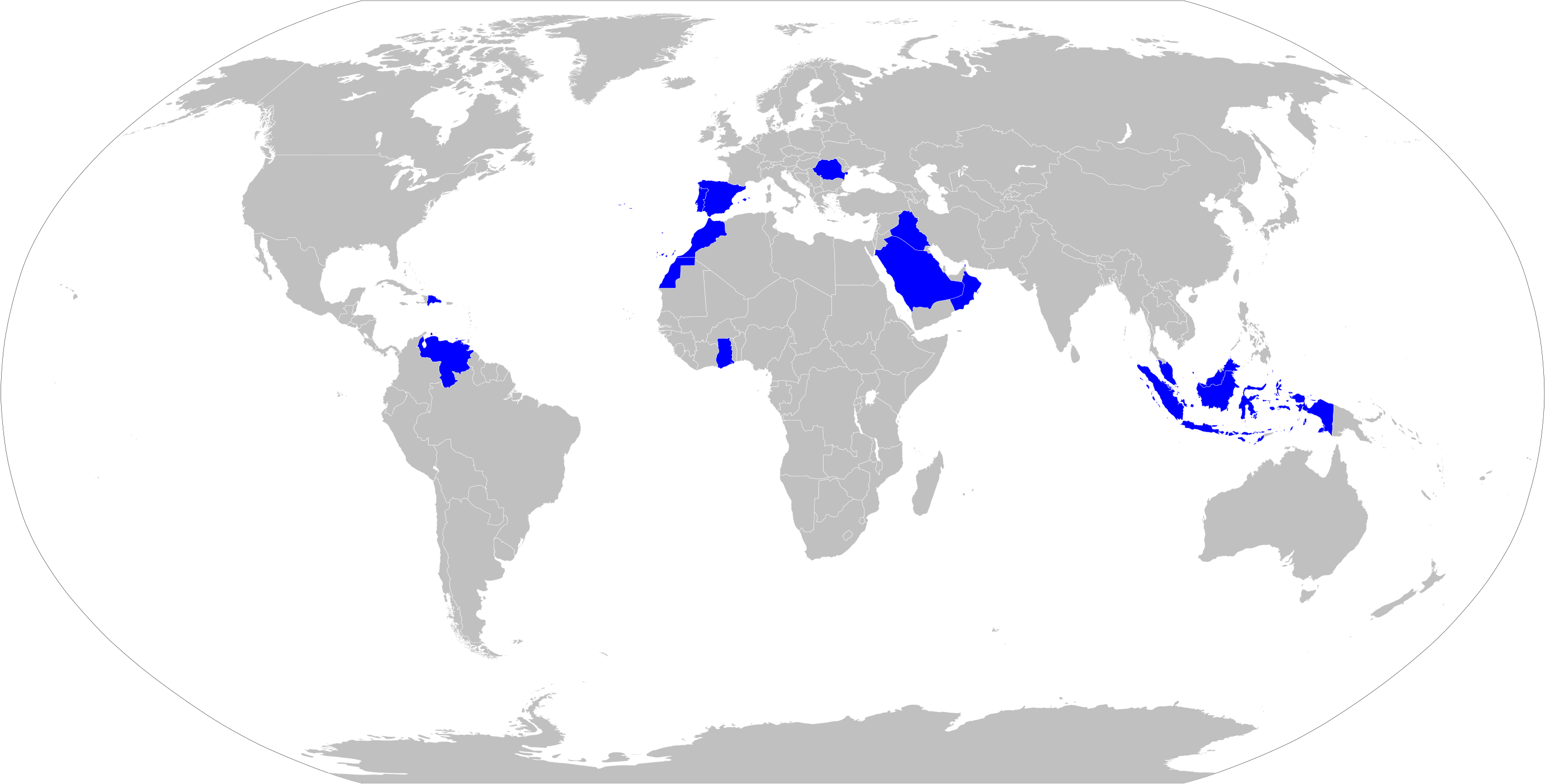
Map of VAMTAC operators in blue with former operators in red

=== Current operators ===
- Dominican Republic – 60–80 vehicles
- Ghana –
- Indonesia – 40+ vehicles, ST5 (RapidRanger MMS version) & LTV (LML/LML-NG & command version)
- Iraq – 255 vehicles
- Malaysia – 103 vehicles
- Mali – National Gendarmerie (Malian Armed Forces) – 2 vehicles donated by the United States in late 2022.
- Morocco – 1,200 vehicles
- New Zealand – New Zealand Army – 40 CK3 medium variants and 20 ST5 light variants on order.
- Philippines - Philippine Marine Corps -ST5 tactical field ambulances for Peacekeeping Operations delivered in 2026.
- Portugal – Purchased 139 ST5 BN3 vehicles in October 2018. In 2024 Portuguese Army ordered 4 VAMTAC ST5 vehicles with quadruple Starstreak missile launcher. In 2026 Portuguese Marine Corps ordered 75 vehicles.
- Romania – 42 VAMTAC S3 and 20 VAMTAC S3-HD variants. ST5 variant also used by the EOD units.
- Saudi Arabia – 10 vehicles
- Singapore –
- Spain – Spanish Armed Forces, National Police, Guardia Civil, Emergency Units – Around 4,000 vehicles
- Oman – Royal Army of Oman, Royal Guard of Oman
- Ukraine – Armed Forces of Ukraine – 20 vehicles delivered in April 2022. Additional 100 vehicles to be delivered throughout 2026 by the Spanish Government

=== Future operators ===
- United Kingdom – British Army – Pending order for 12 vehicles equipped with Rapid Ranger quadruple launchers, to use LMM and Starstreak missiles replacing the six Alvis Stormer vehicles donated to Ukraine.

=== Evaluation-only operators ===
- Brazil – (on trial, not adopted)
- Paraguay – (on trial, not adopted)

== Gallery ==
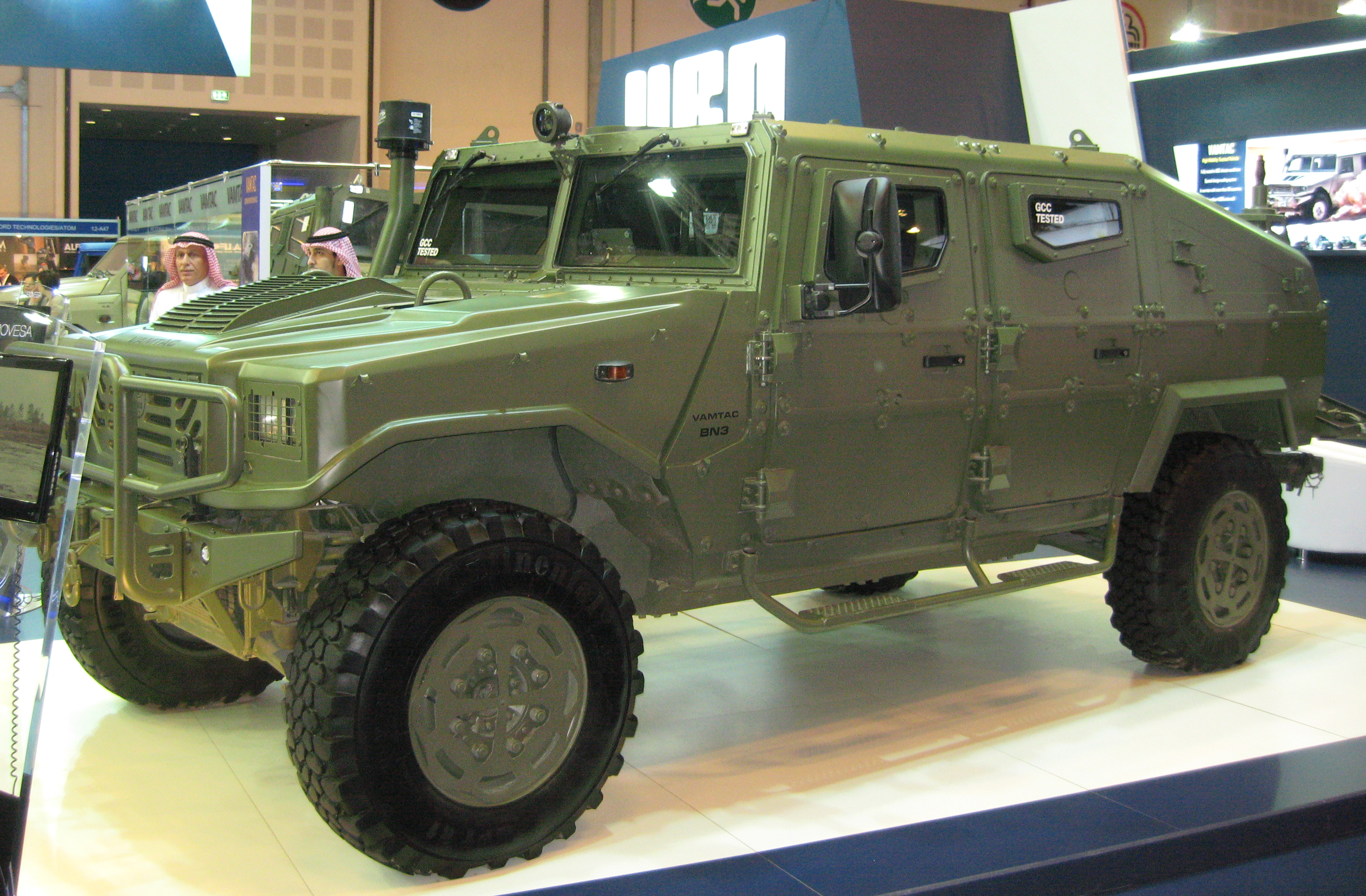
Version equipped with Composhield add-on armor kit, on display at IDEX 2013

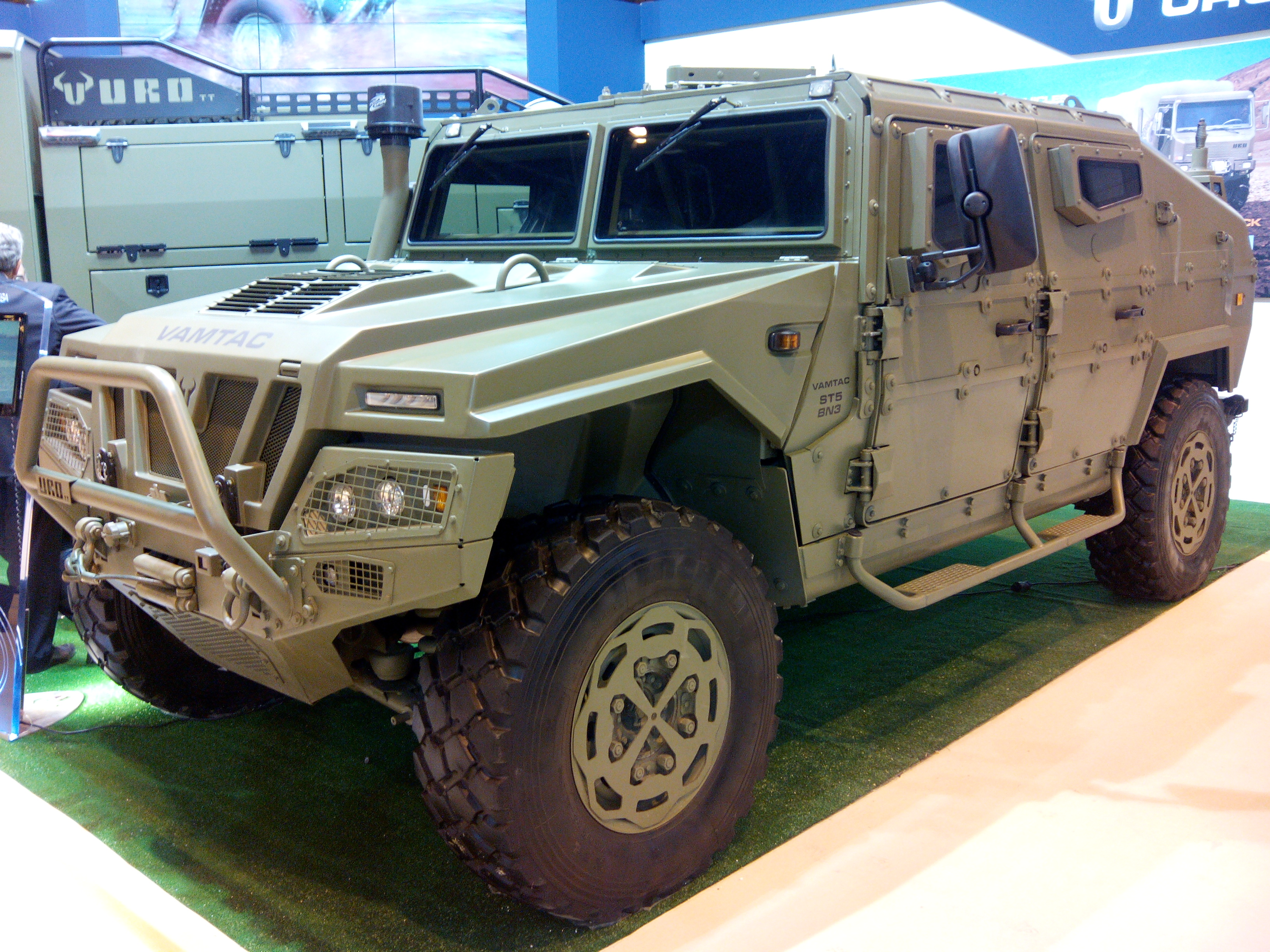
URO VAMTAC ST5 BN3 exhibited at Homsec 2015

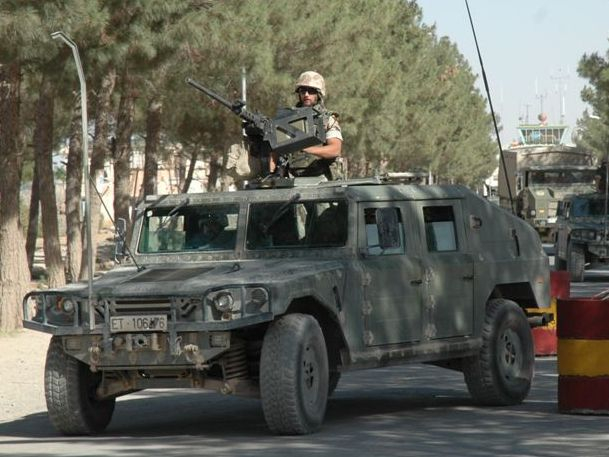
An URO VAMTAC S3 of the Spanish Army in Herat, Afghanistan, in 2005

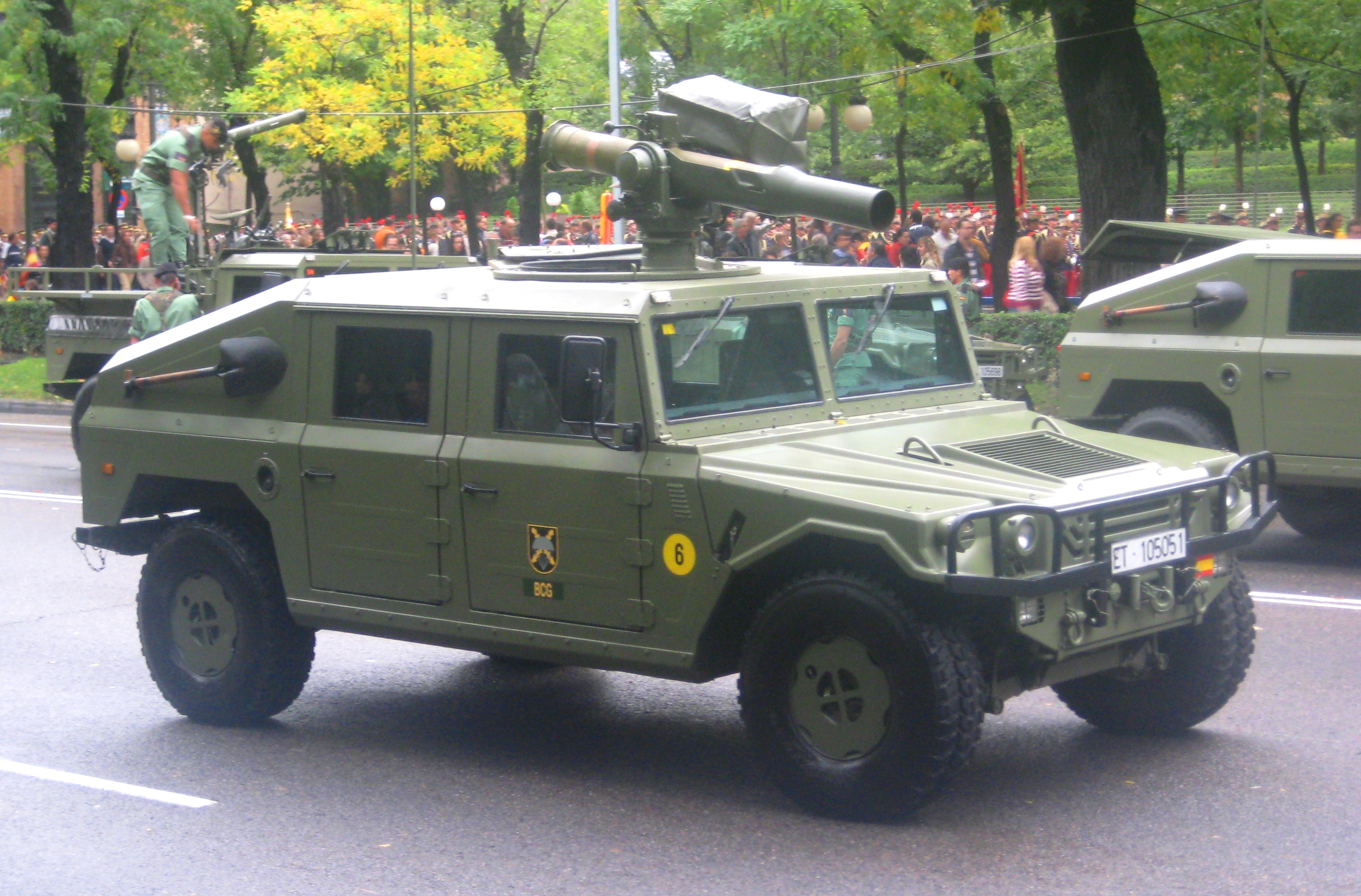
Armed with BGM-71 TOW launcher

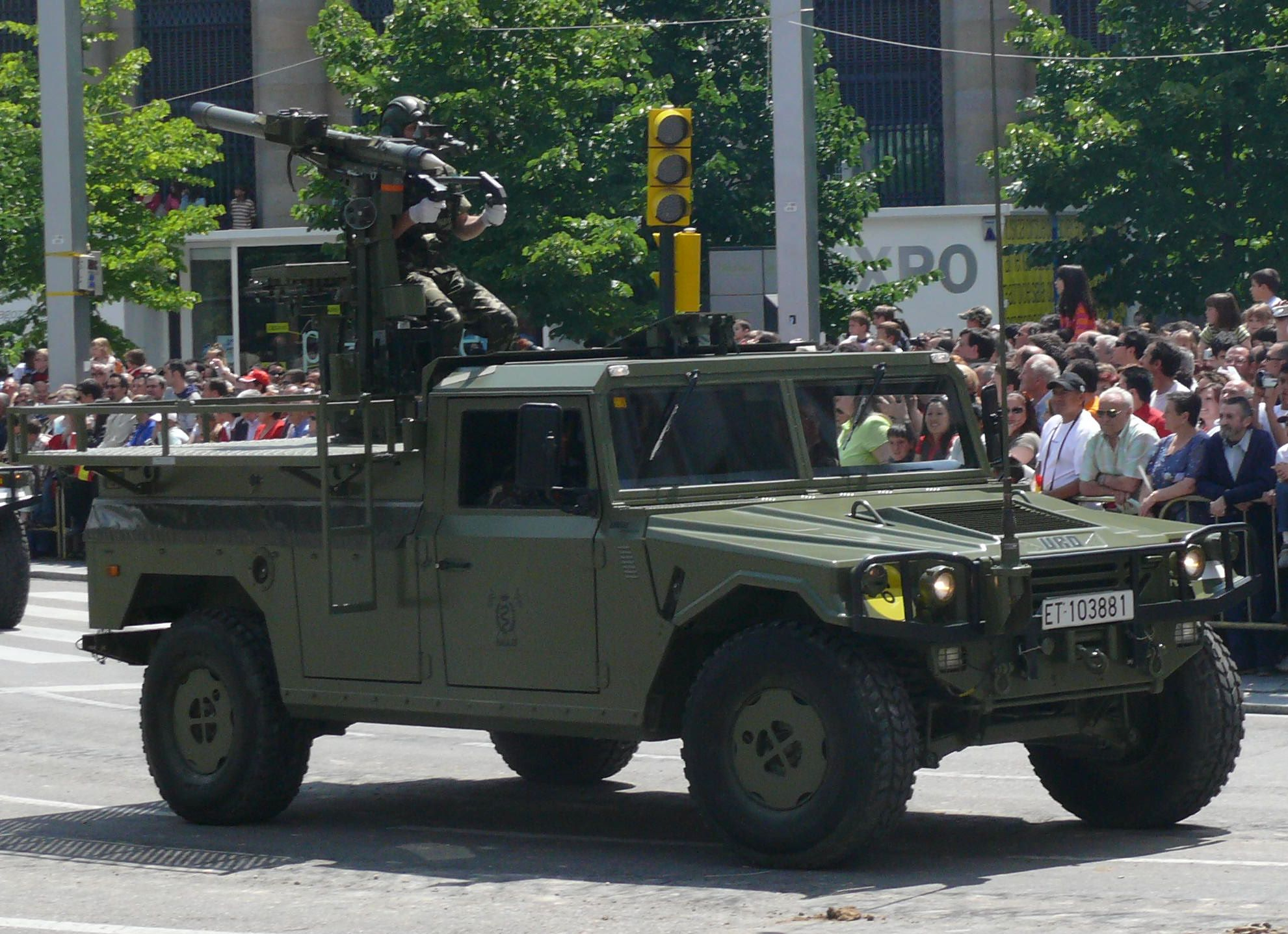
Armed with Mistral launcher

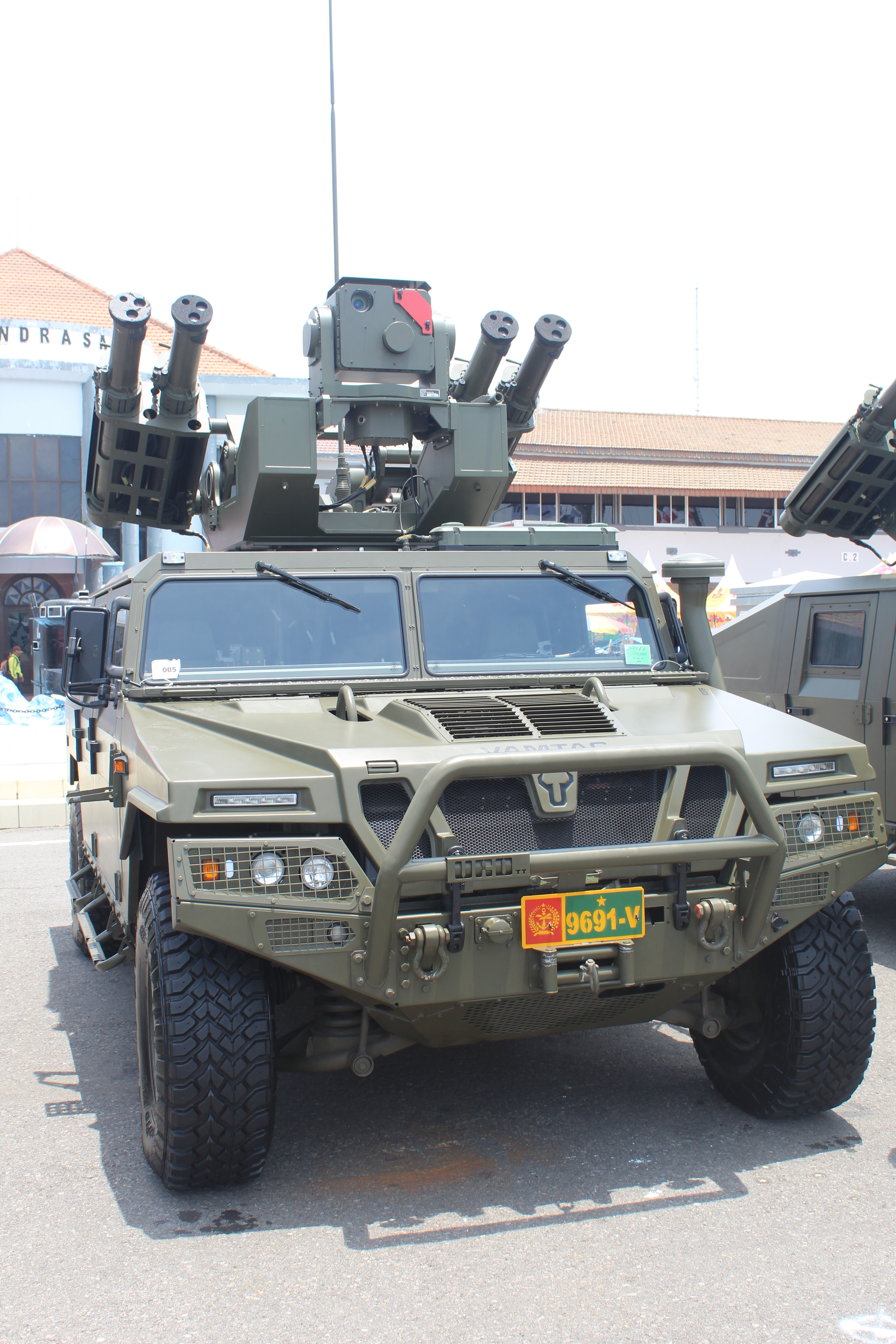
Armed with Starstreak MMS launcher

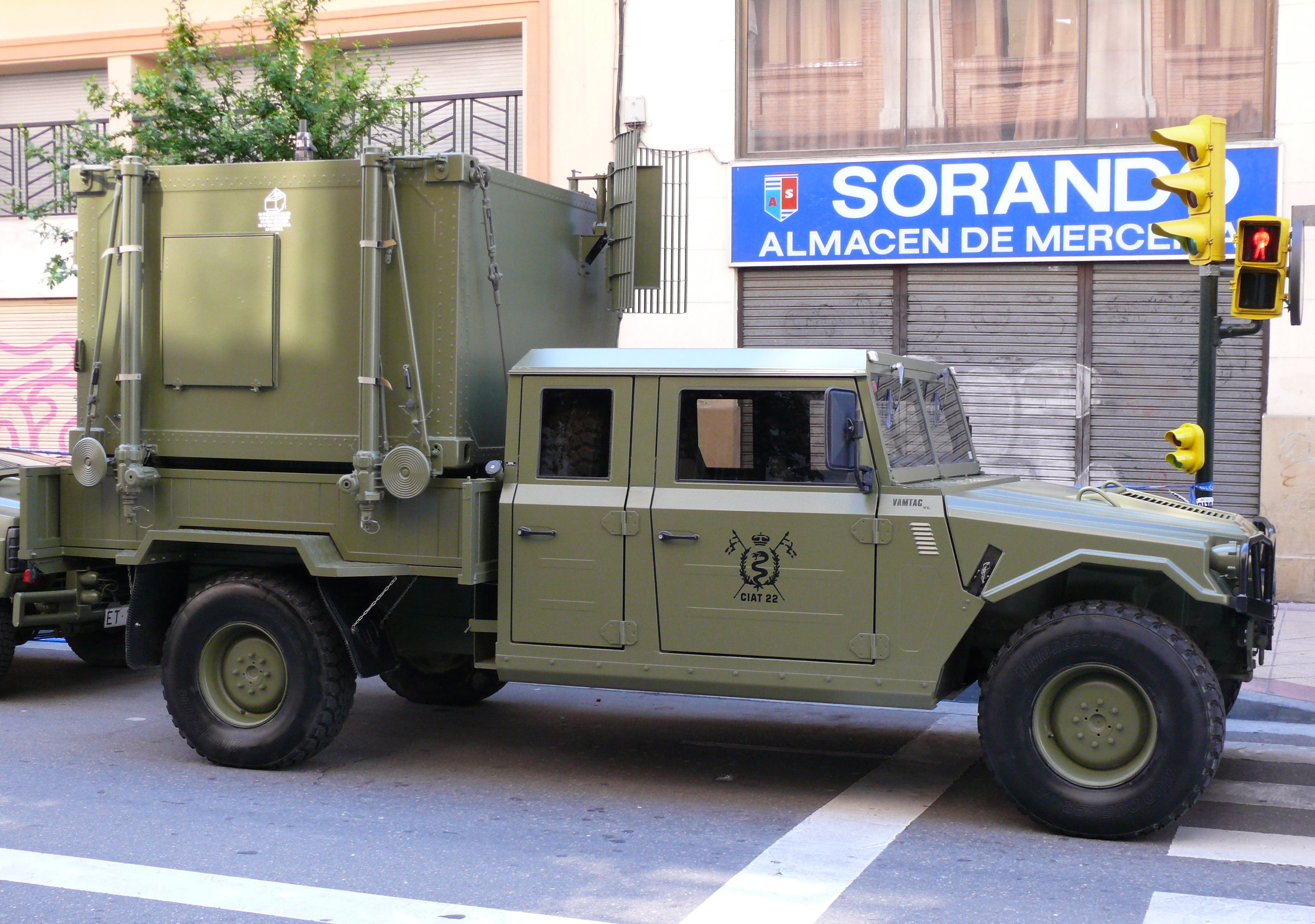
Communications vehicle

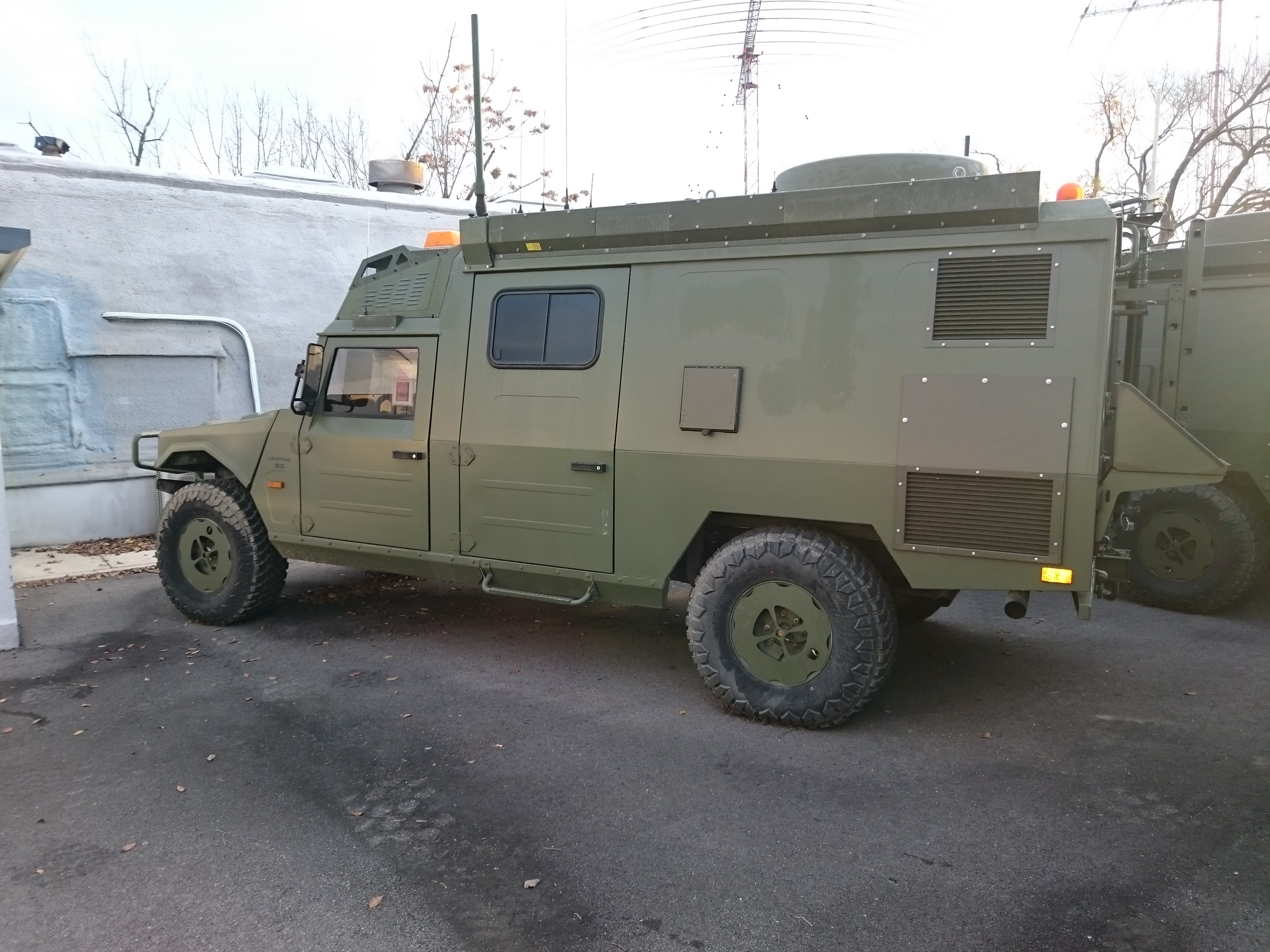
Fully integrated van-body

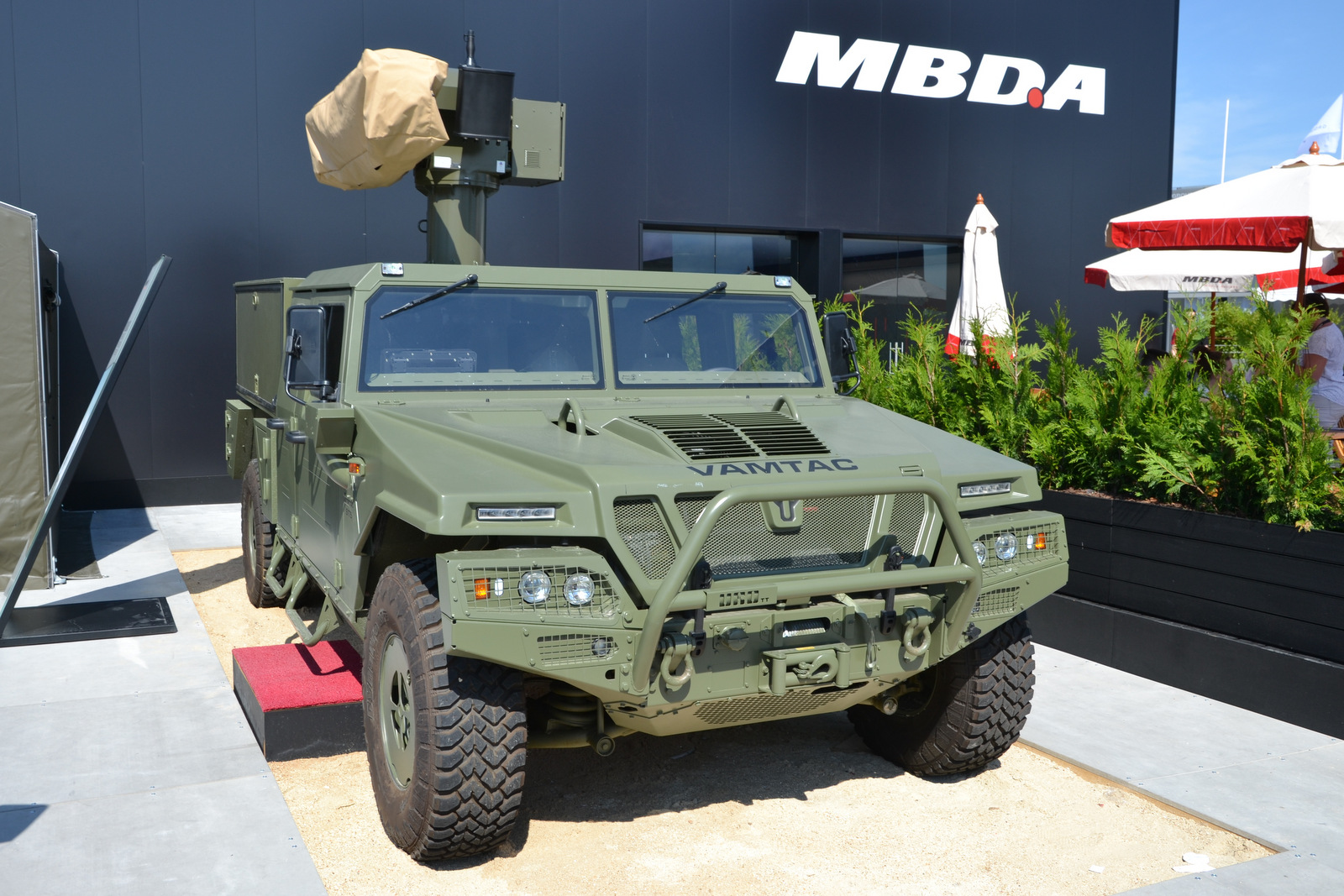
URO VAMTAC at Paris Air Show 2019

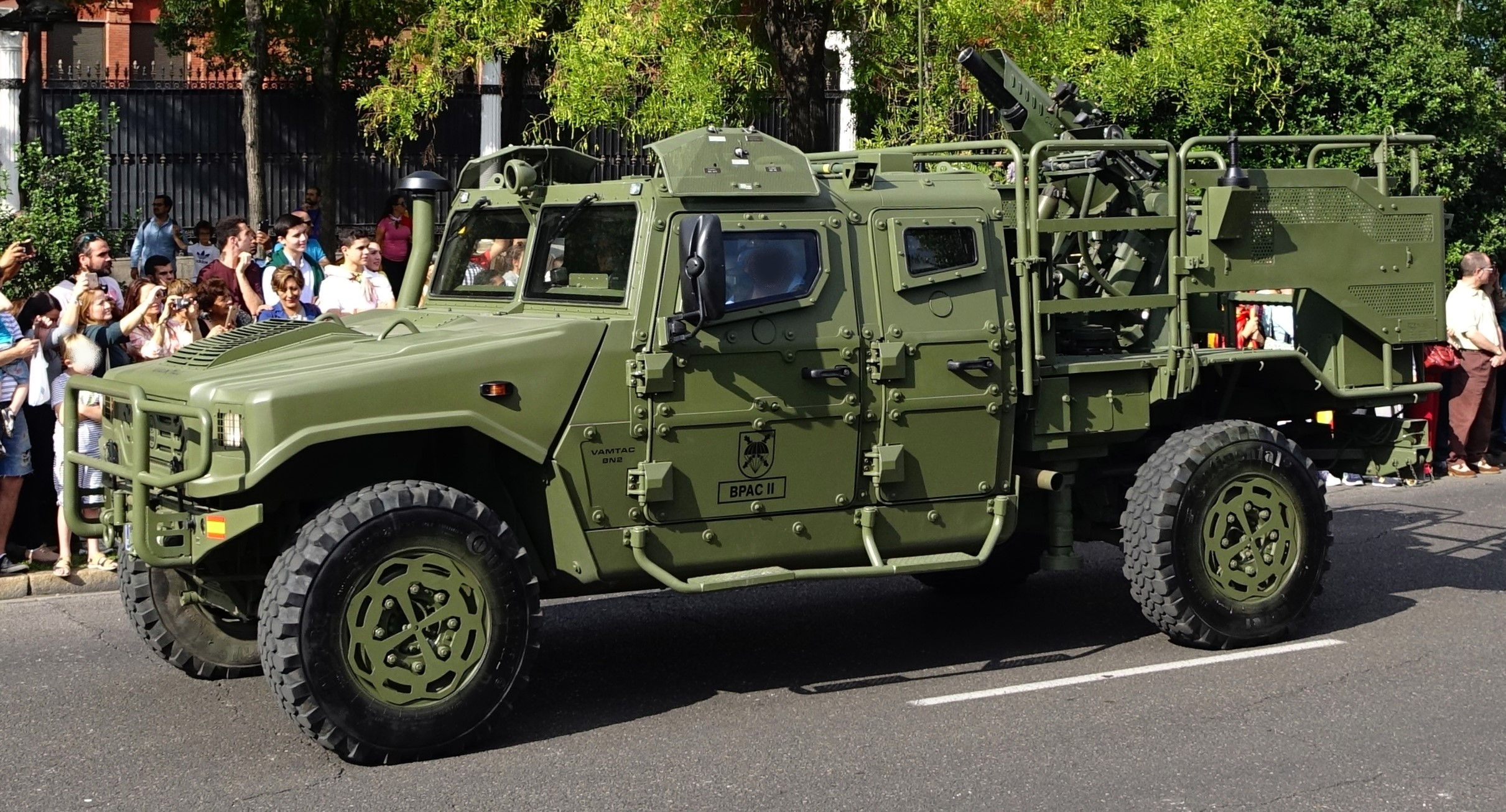
Spanish LWB version with armored crew-cab and weapon-system on open rear bed

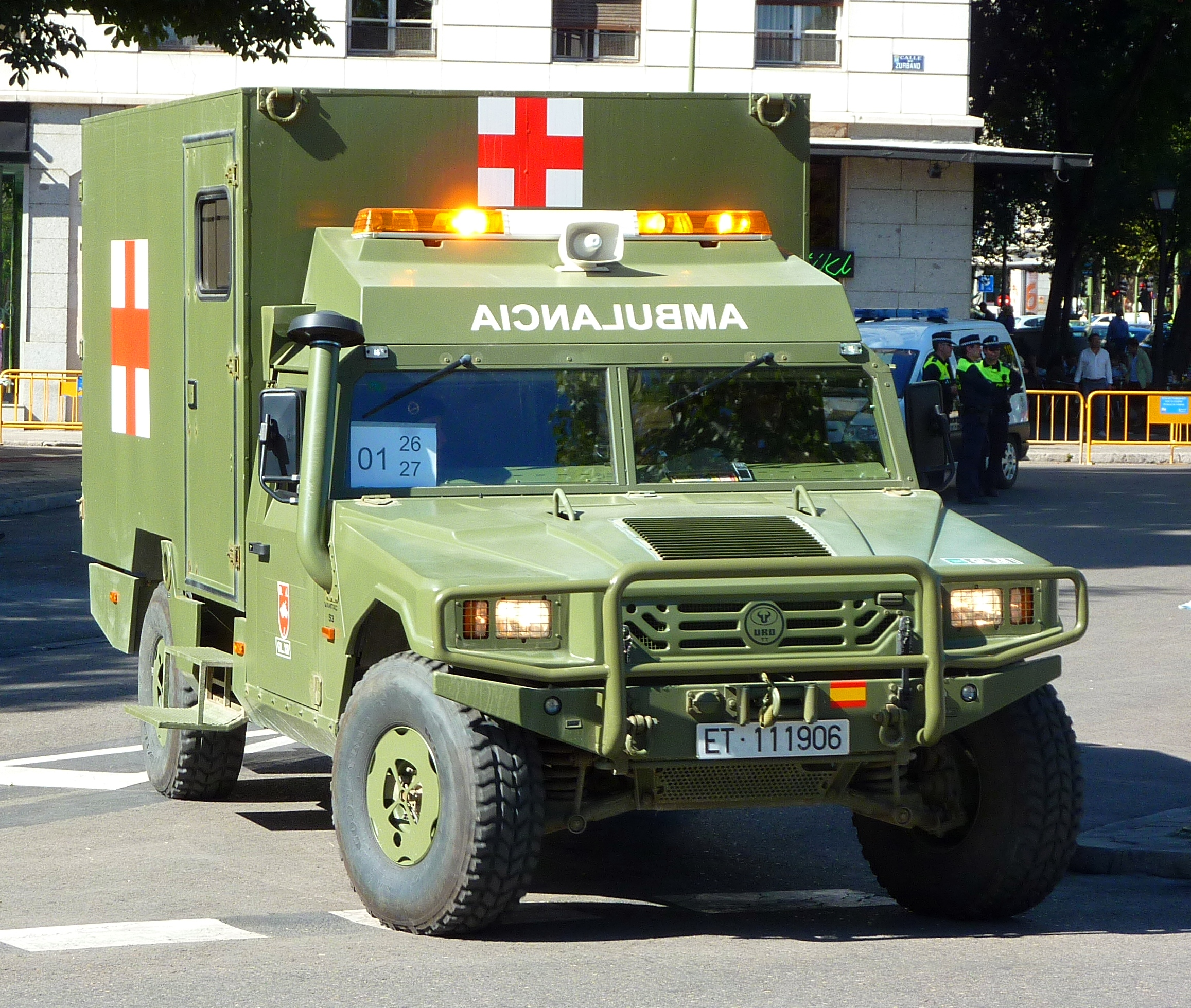
S3 Ambulance version of the Spanish Army

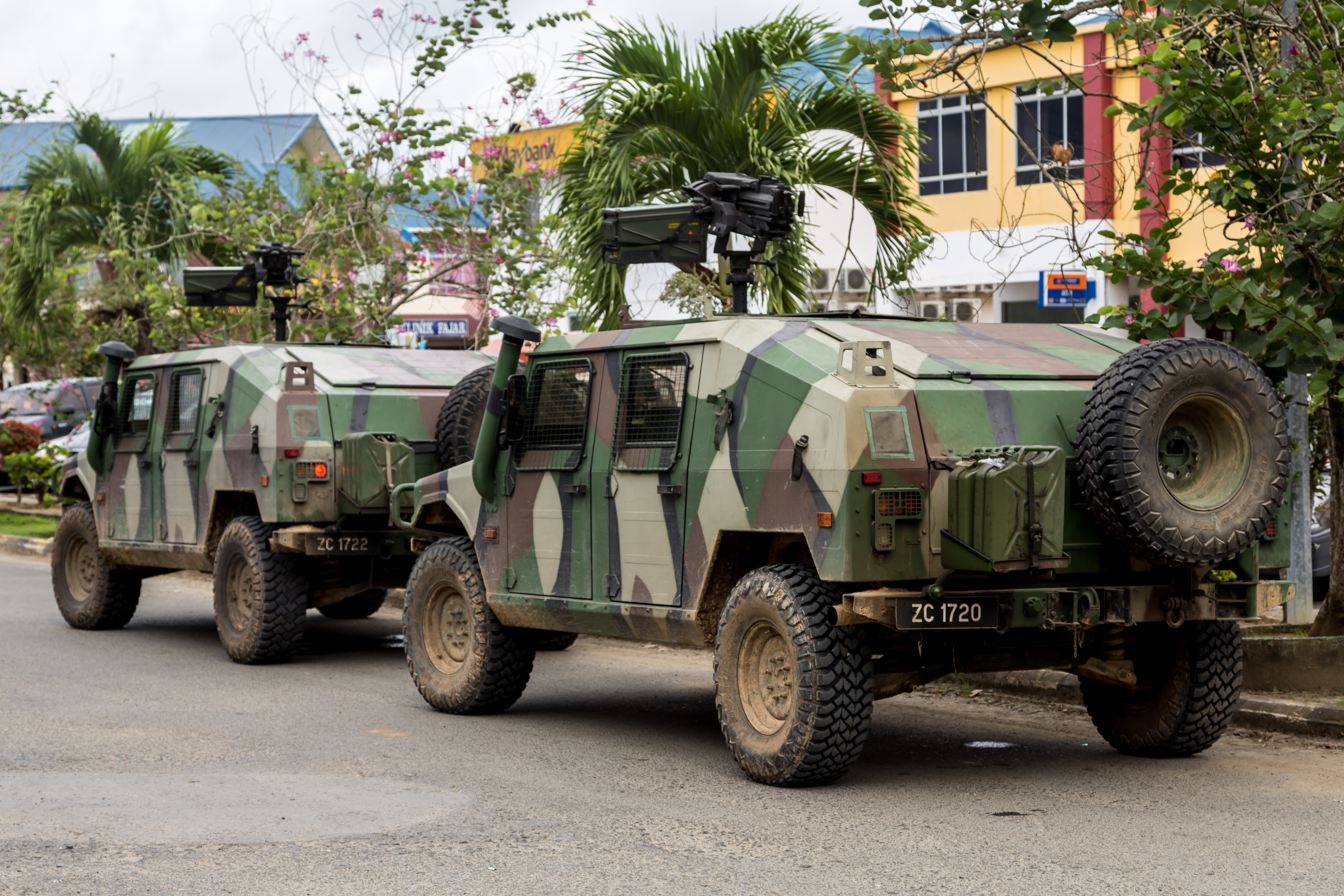
Malaysian Army URO VAMTAC in old Harimau Belang camouflage

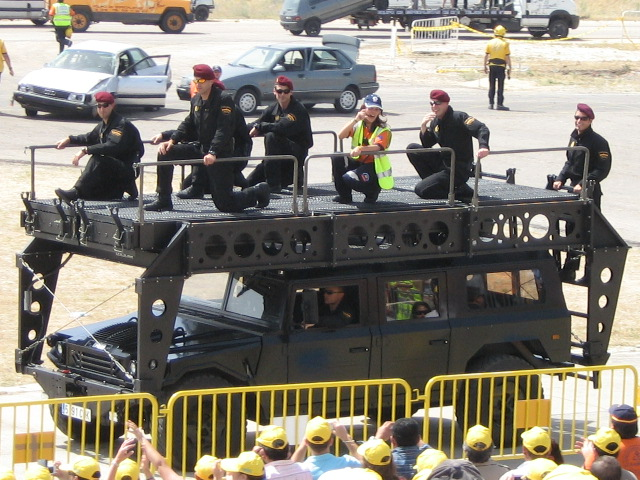
URO VAMTAC with assault equipment from the National Police Corps (Spain)

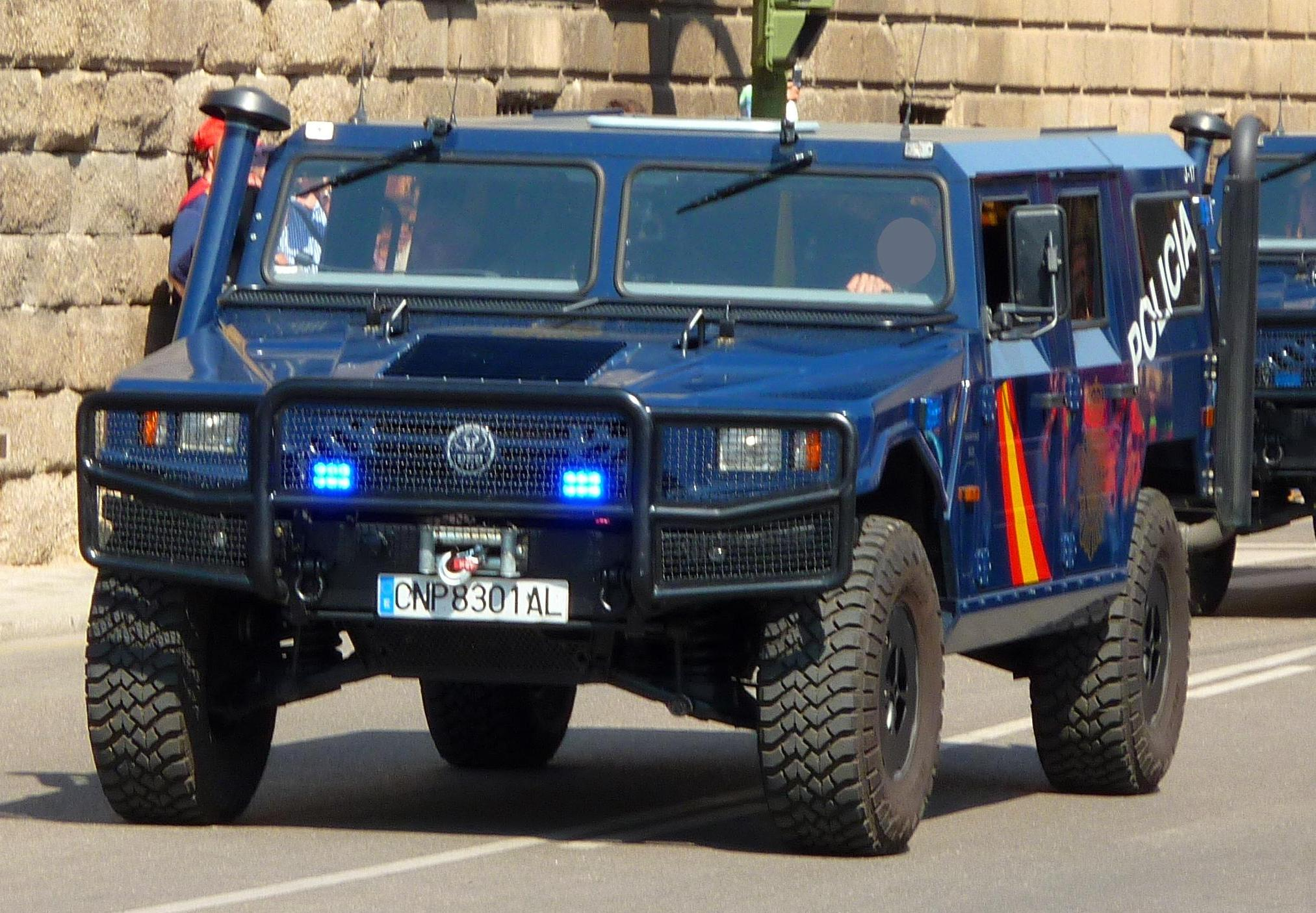
URO VAMTAC of the National Police Corps (Spain)

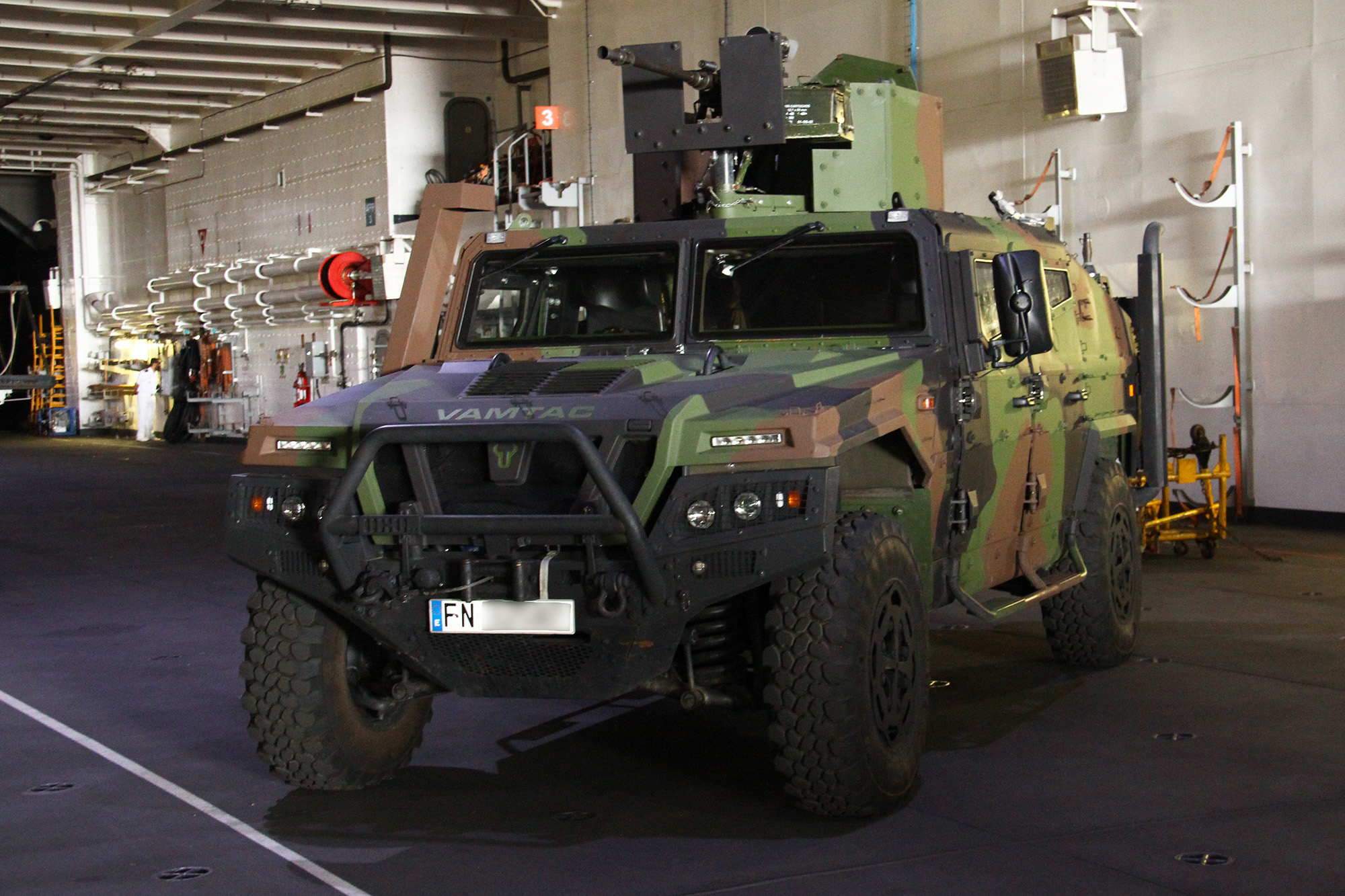
URO VAMTAC ST5 of the Spanish Marines inside the hangar of L61 Juan Carlos I

== See also ==
- Humvee, which has a similar chassis and frame
- Hawkei – an Australian four-wheel drive military vehicle
- Iveco LMV – an Italian four-wheel drive military vehicle.
- Tarpan Honker – a Polish four-wheel drive military vehicle.
- Toyota Mega Cruiser – a Japanese four-wheel drive military vehicle, also similar in appearance and design to the US Humvee.
- List of armoured fighting vehicles by country
