= Investigación y Proyectos de Vehículos Especiales =

Investigación y Proyectos de Vehículos Especiales, S.A.
- Company type: Sociedad Anónima
- Industry: Automotive
- Founded: A Pontenova,Galicia, Spain (2 May 1963)
- Defunct: 2006
- Fate: Bankrupted
- Successor: Buxo trucks
- Headquarters: A Pontenova, Galicia, Spain
- Parent: MAFSA

Investigación y Proyectos de Vehículos Especiales, S.A. (IPV) was a Spanish heavy vehicle manufacturer based in A Pontenova, Galicia.

IPV's parent company, Mafsa, started in 1965 as a joint venture of three local automotive workshops. They had for some years re-conditioned ex-Spanish Civil War light 4x4 trucks, mostly of Italian OM manufacture, and fitted them with diesel engines.

The first Mafsa product was a narrow-width truck, with a very elementary cab and either a Barreiros or Perkins engine, specifically designed for the northwestern Spain logging industry, and nicknamed carroceta.

As Mafsa had no sales network, the carrocetas were only sold from the plant. Nevertheless they were quite successful, and allowed Mafsa to expand into more general-purpose 4x4 trucks, which were specially in demand for fire-fighting and construction off-road applications. Mafsa eventually appointed a few dealers around Spain and therefore became a truck maker worthy of the name.

By then the trade mark was Mafsa itself, but in 1972 it was switched to IPV.

The IPV model range grew gradually, up to vehicles of 270 horsepower and 24 ton gross weight. IPV switched to OEM engines from MAN, and to a new, more modern-looking, and more comfortable cab. Especially interesting were a bi-modal (road/railway) model and a dockside tractor to pull semi-trailers along short distances.

IPV went into receivership in October 2006, and all activity ceased.

== Gallery ==
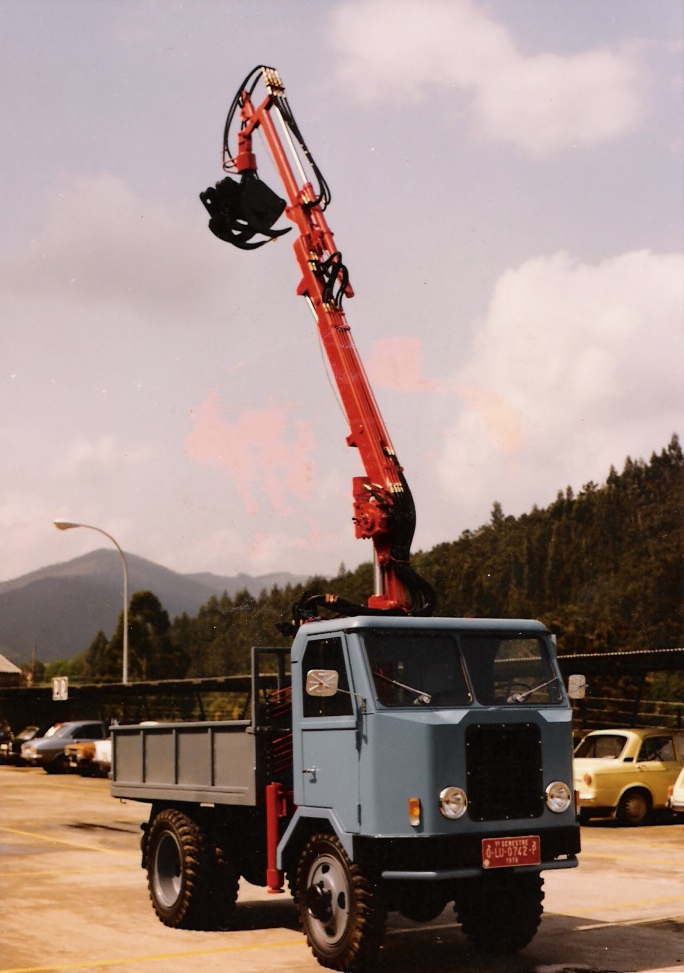
IPV with crane

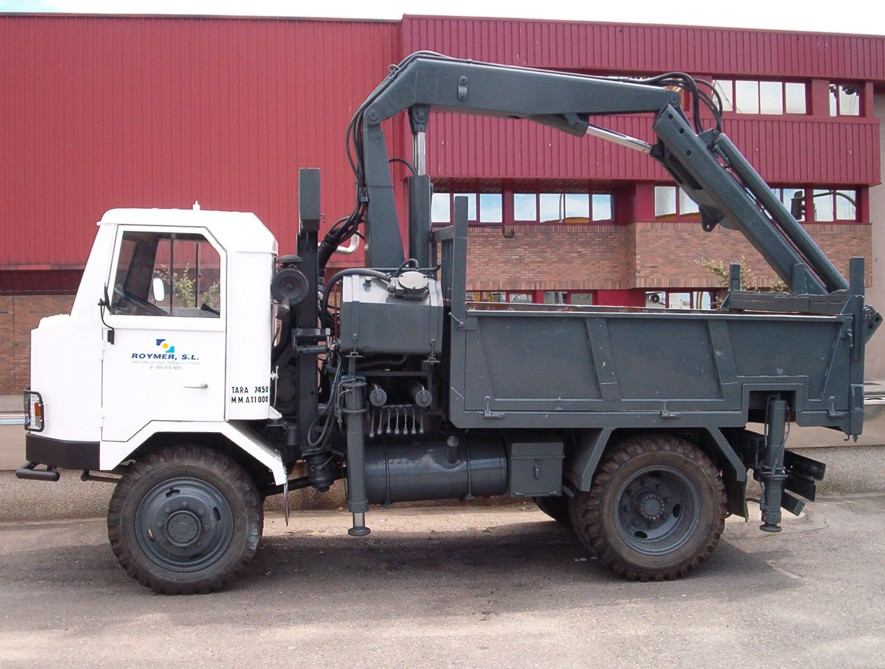
IPV with crane 2

== See also ==
- Uro (trucks) - A new company started by IPV employees when IPV shut down.
