= Royal Artillery =

Artillery arm of the British Army

Royal Regiment of Artillery
- Badge of the Royal Regiment of Artillery
- Active: 1716–present
- Allegiance: United Kingdom
- Branch: British Army
- Role: Artillery
- Size: 13 Regular regiments 5 Reserve regiments
- Garrison/HQ: Larkhill Garrison
- Motto: Ubique Quo Fas Et Gloria Ducunt (Note: "Everywhere That Right And Glory Lead"; in Latin fas implies "sacred duty"))
- Colours: The guns are regarded as the regimental colours
- March: British Grenadiers / Voice Of The Guns (Quick); The Royal Artillery Slow March colloquially known as The Duchess of Kent (Slow); The Keel Row (Trot); "Bonnie Dundee" (Canter)

Commanders
- Captain-General: King Charles III
- Master Gunner, St James's Park: Lieutenant General Sir Andrew Gregory

Insignia
- Tactical recognition flash

The Royal Regiment of Artillery, commonly referred to as the Royal Artillery (RA) and colloquially known as "The Gunners", is one of two (Note: The Honourable Artillery Company, a Regiment in its own right, also provides equipment and crews in support of 7 (Para) RHA) regiments that make up the artillery arm of the British Army. The Royal Regiment of Artillery comprises thirteen Regular Army regiments, the King's Troop Royal Horse Artillery and five Army Reserve regiments.

== History ==
=== Formation to 1799 ===
Artillery was used by English troops as early as the Battle of Crécy in 1346, while Henry VIII established it as a semi-permanent function in the 16th century. Similarly in Scotland, artillery such as the 15th century bombard Mons Meg was kept in Edinburgh Castle. Until the British Civil Wars, the military was composed primarily of what would later be termed the Militia, also known as the "Constitutional Force", which was recruited by different forms of conscription depending on the period, but this was not considered a standing army as, although constantly maintained in readiness, its members normally only were embodied for annual training. In wartime or emergency they could be embodied for the duration. These units and their members also could not be compelled to serve overseas on expeditionary campaigns. Military expeditionary units in England were raised for specific campaigns and disbanded when they were over. An exception were gunners based at the Tower of London, Portsmouth and other forts around Britain, who were controlled by the Ordnance Office and stored and maintained equipment and provided personnel for field artillery 'traynes' that were organised as needed.

These personnel, responsible in peacetime for maintaining the forts with their garrison artillery (or coastal artillery), were the first regular artillerymen, organised in 1540 under the Master-General and Board of Ordnance, but paid directly by the Exchequer. The regular artillerymen of the District Establishments were responsible for upkeep of the fort and maintenance of equipment, and would be brought up to strength in wartime with untrained personnel drafted in from the English Army or the Militia. The post of Captain of Fort was replaced (at least in England, if not in its colonies) with that of Governor following the Restoration. When Marlborough was restored as Master-General of the Ordnance in 1714, he initiated a series of reforms, which included splitting the existing Ordnance Service into artillery and sappers or engineers. The artillery were formed into two marching companies, each of 100 men, in 1716.

These marching companies were renamed the "Royal Artillery" in 1720. These were increased to four companies and on 1 April 1722 grouped with independent artillery units at Gibraltar and Menorca to form the Royal Regiment of Artillery; the first commander was Colonel Albert Borgard, a Dane who served in the British army since 1698.

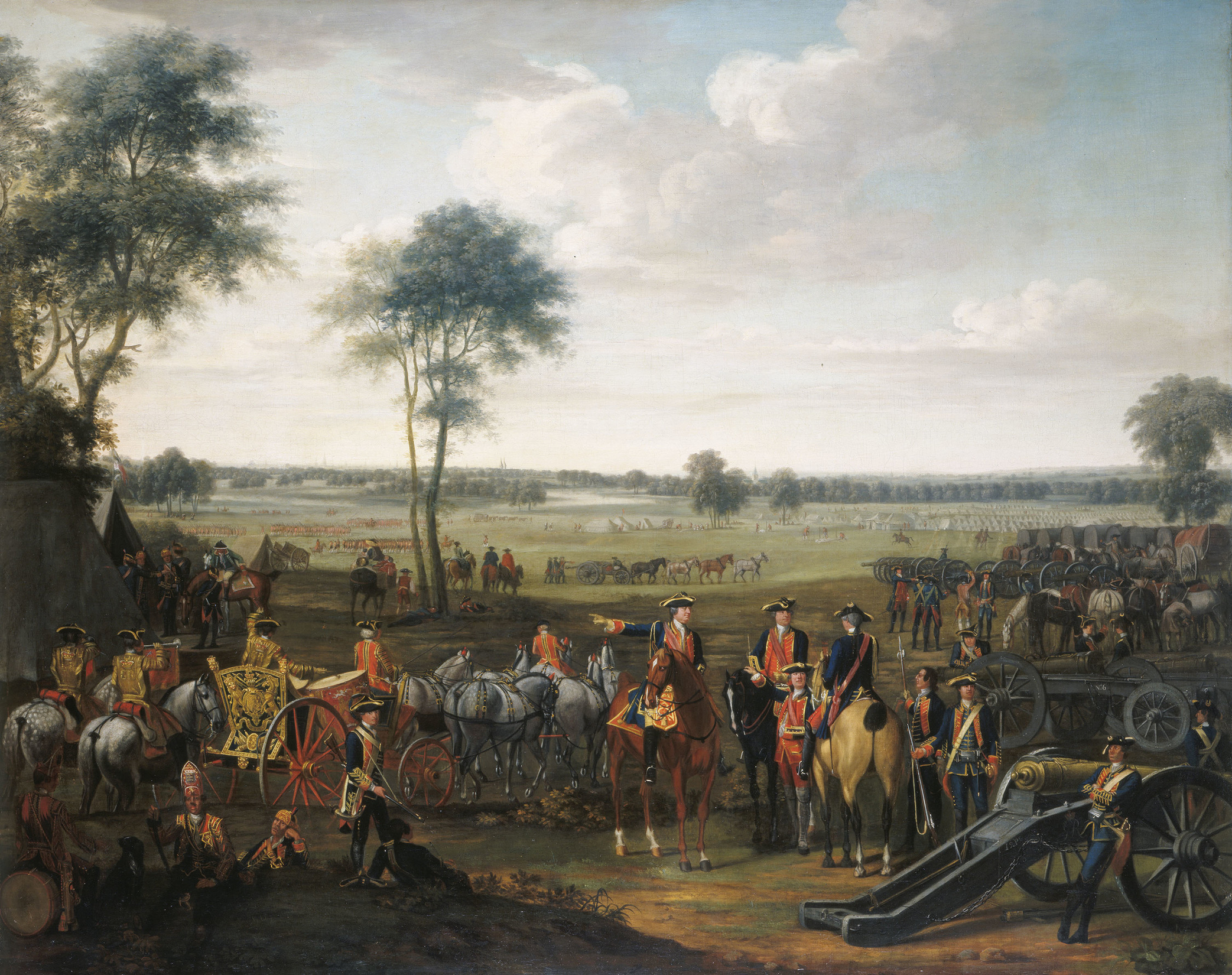
Royal Artillery troops in the Low Countries in 1748 during the War of the Austrian Succession

Aside from the Master Gunner of England, the detachments in each fort formed a District Establishment that included a Captain of Fort, a Master-Gunner or Chief-Gunner, and a number of other ranks, including Gunners, Gunner's Mates, Quarter-Gunners, and Matroses. Their numbers were extremely small; as late as 1720, the total establishment for the whole of Britain was 41 master gunners and 178 gunner assistants. Although the Royal Artillery increasingly involved itself with the coastal artillery in Britain, also, the District Establishments remained independent until February 1771, when the Royal Artillery formed eight Invalid Companies (made up of personnel no longer fit for expeditionary service) into which they were absorbed (although the District Establishments would still rely on drafts of sailors, British Army soldiers, Militia infantrymen, or Volunteers to bring the batteries up to wartime strength until the formation of Militia Artillery and Volunteer Artillery in the 1850s).

A Royal Artillery soldier in 1777

During the 18th century, the British regular military forces, including the Board of Ordnance's military corps (the Royal Artillery, Royal Engineers and later the Royal Sappers and Miners) and the British Army (composed mostly of infantry and cavalry) became increasingly professional (various reserve, or local, forces also existed, including: the Militia, or old Constitutional Force, normally made up of infantry units; the mounted Yeomanry; and Volunteer units of various types, normally raised only during wartime), particularly in the fields of artillery and engineering; Britain lagged behind others in this area, with Vauban establishing the French Corps royal des ingénieurs militaires as far back as 1690.

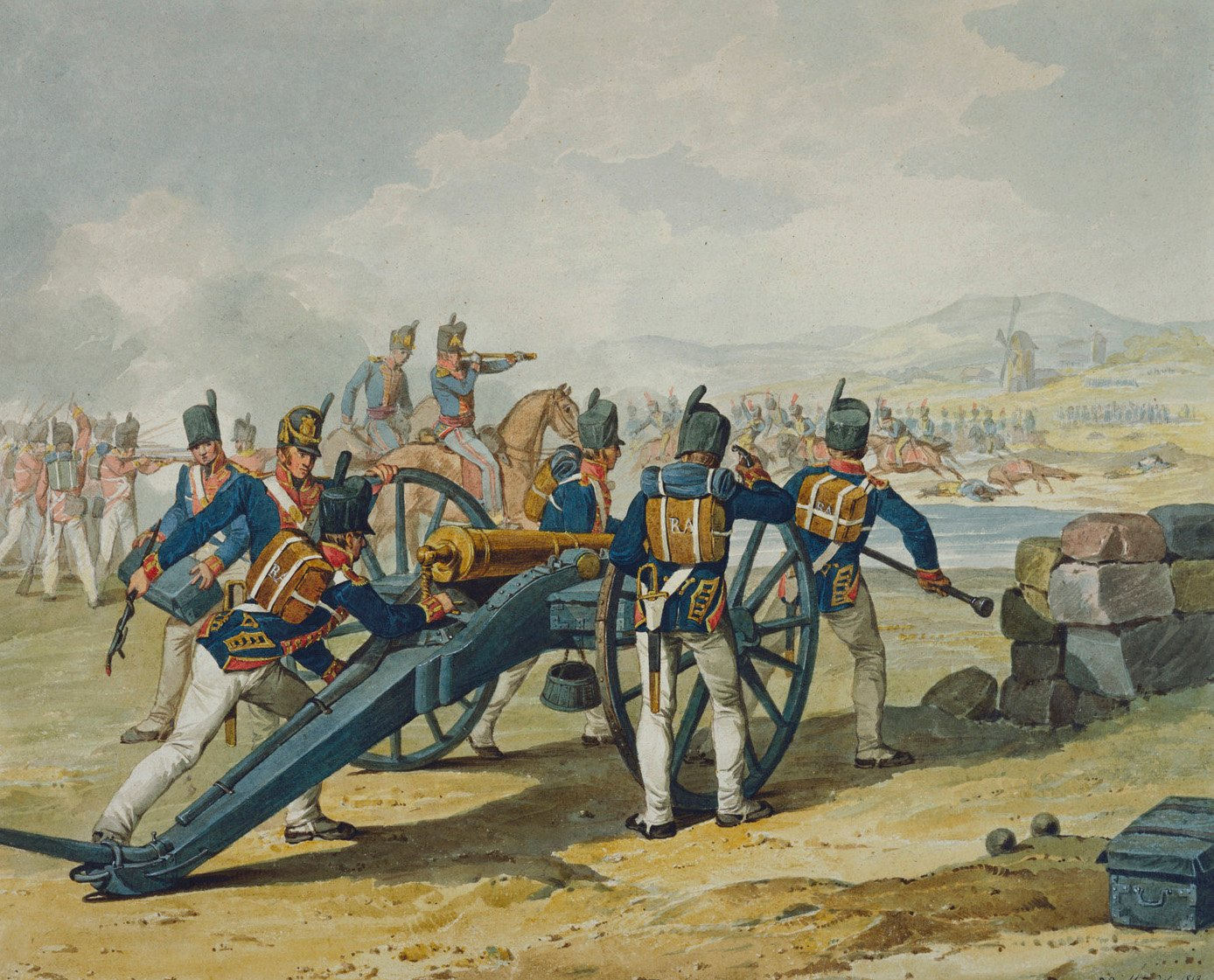
A Royal Artillery gun crew bombarding French cavalry during an 1813 engagement of the Peninsular War

A cadet company was formed at the Royal Military Academy or RMA Woolwich in 1741; this trained artillery and engineering officers for the regiment, the East India Company and the Royal Irish Artillery. In 1757, it split into two battalions, each of twelve companies; by 1780, it contained 32 companies in four battalions, two "invalid companies" used solely for garrison duties and the Royal Artillery Band, with a total strength of 5,241 men and officers.

Originally based in the Royal Arsenal, beginning in 1770 the regiment was rehoused in the Royal Artillery Barracks on Woolwich Common. A major innovation in 1793 was the establishment of the Royal Horse Artillery, designed to provide mobile fire support for cavalry units. The same year saw the foundation of the Corps of Royal Artillery Drivers to provide transport for the artillery.

Fixed Coastal Artillery batteries were generally manned in peacetime by a handful of Royal Artillery personnel primarily responsible for maintenance, who were reinforced in wartime by drafts of infantrymen from the British Army or the Militia, or by temporarily raised Volunteer Artillery corps. This was to remain the case through the Naploeonic Wars.

=== 1800–1899 ===
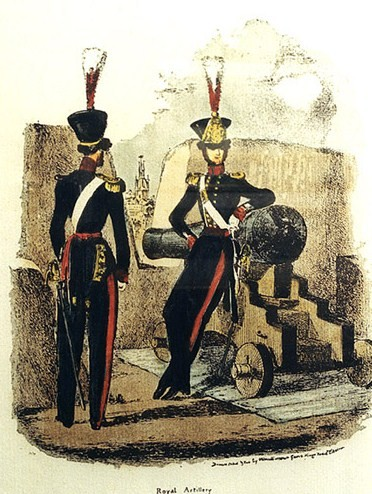
Royal Artillery Officers uniform, 1825

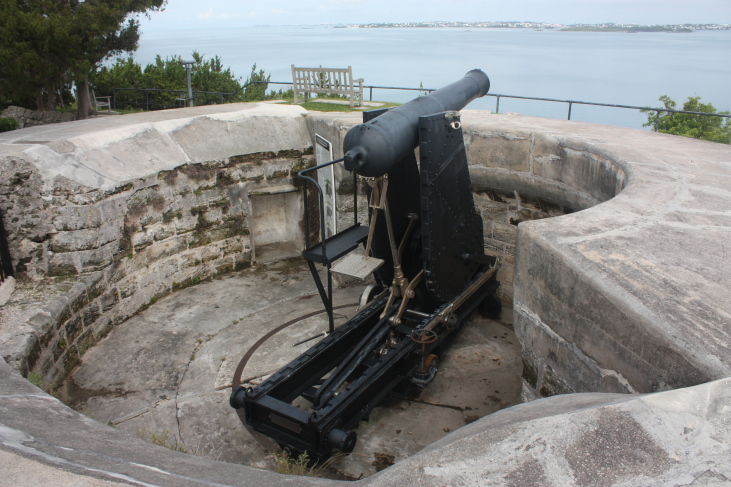
64 Pounder Rifled Muzzle-Loader (RML) gun on Moncrieff disappearing mount, at Scaur Hill Fort, Bermuda

The regiment was involved in all major campaigns of the Napoleonic Wars; in 1804, naval artillery was transferred to the Royal Marine Artillery, while the Royal Irish Artillery lost its separate status in 1810 after the 1800 Union. This period also saw development of the Congreve rocket; based on an existing Indian design, these were the first solid-fuel projectiles used by the British army and two rocket troops were established in 1814. Their use in the War of 1812 is referenced in the line "rocket's red glare" which appears in the Star-Spangled Banner.

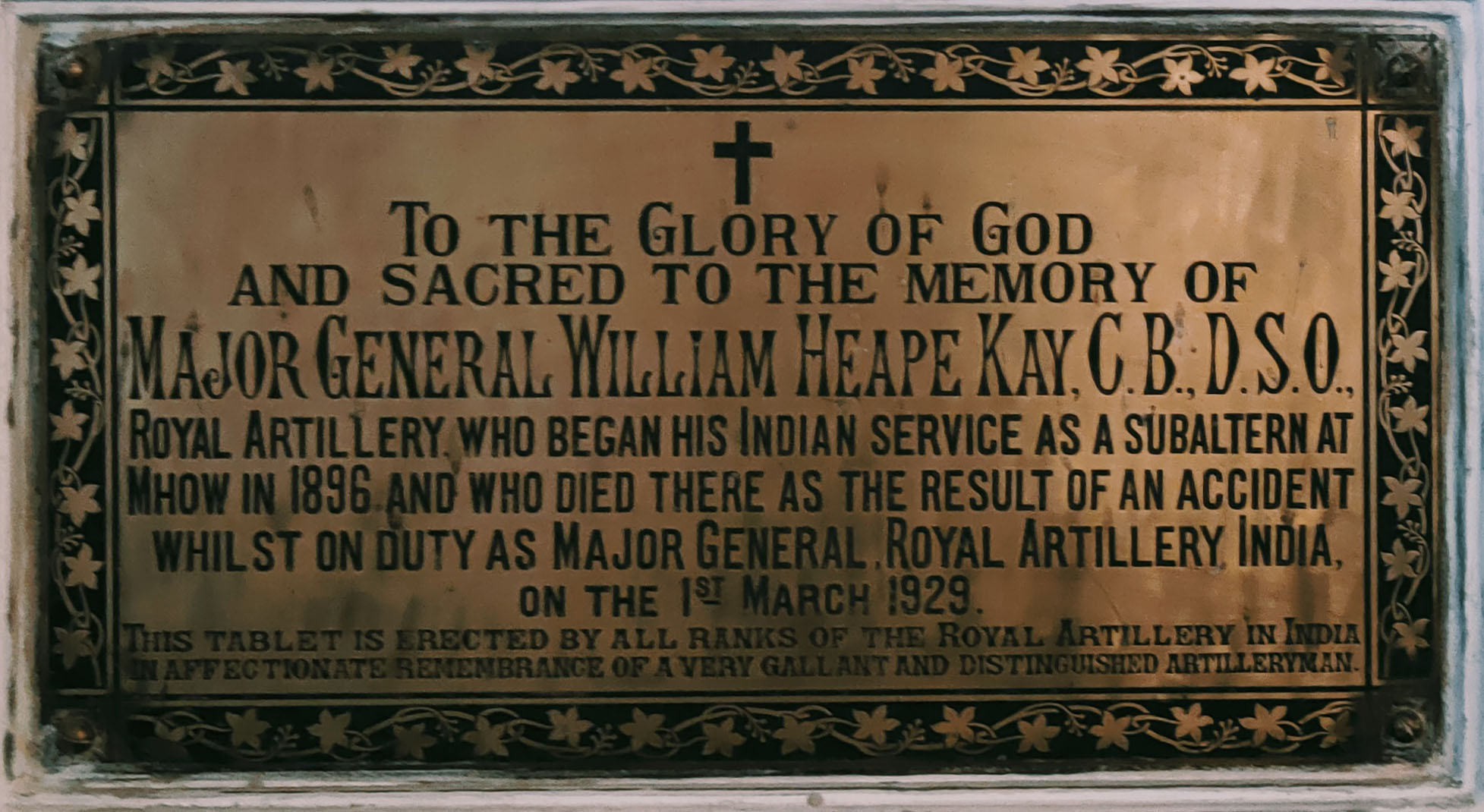
This brass plaque installed inside Christ Church, Mhow is in memory of Major General William Heape Kay of the Royal Artillery who began his Indian service at Mhow in 1896 and subsequently died in an accident there in 1929

The Militia, which had been a paper tiger since the end of the Napoleonic Wars, was re-organised under the Militia Act 1852 in response to the threat of invasion by France, changing it from a conscripted force to one made up of volunteers who engaged for terms of service. The force continued to be a reserve tasked with home defence, embodied for annual training, and for the duration of wars or emergencies. The Militia had been principally an infantry force to this date, but Militia Artillery units were added from this point, and some existing Militia Infantry regiments were converted to coastal artillery. The role of the Militia Artillery was to man coastal defences and fortifications in wartime, relieving the Royal Artillery (RA) for active service.

The Royal Artillery (and also of the Royal Engineers, Royal Sappers and Miners, the Commissariat Department, and various barracks, ordnance stores, and transport departments) was transferred to the British Army when the Board of Ordnance was abolished in 1855 (the administrative branches of the Board were absorbed by the War Office) and the War Office School of Gunnery established in Shoeburyness in 1859. When the British East India Company was dissolved in 1862, its artillery function was absorbed by the Royal Artillery, giving it a total strength of 29 horse batteries, 73 field batteries and 88 heavy batteries. Military expenditure estimates for 1872 list the regimental strength as a total of 34,943 men and officers, including those in India.

Although the Militia and the Volunteer Force remained separate forces, during the latter half of the Nineteenth Century they were re-organised through a succession of reforms, and increasingly integrated with the British Army. In 1882, the Militia Artillery units lost their individual identities, becoming numbered brigades organised within Royal Artillery territorial divisions (two brigades of horse artillery, four brigades of field artillery and eleven territorial divisions of garrison artillery). In 1889 the number of divisions was reduced to three, and the Militia Artillery brigades were renamed again, mostly regaining some variation of their original territorial names.

Post 1881, militia artillery officers wore for a brief time five button serge foreign service frocks with ball buttons and silver lace. Post 1890, officers transitioned to pocketed examples, again with ball buttons but the frocks varying from pure blue serge to other examples with scarlet facings.

Prior to 1882, each Militia Artillery unit in the United Kingdom wore a unique badge. Between 1882 and 1889, Militia Artillery brigades wore a divisional badge based on that of the Royal Artillery, except that the lower scroll and upper scroll, which on the Royal Artillery badge were inscribed "Quo Fas Et Gloria Ducunt" and "Ubique" (which indicated the regular Royal Artillery, like the Royal Engineers, served everywhere), were respectively inscribed with the name of the territorial division name (by example, North Irish Division) and left blank or covered in a spray of laurel (as the Militia and Volunteer Force were both home defence forces, the members of which could not be sent abroad on expedition without their consents). From 1889 to 1902, the lower scroll was inscribed with the name of the unit (by example, Antrim Artillery) and the upper scroll left blank or covered in a spray of laurel. Grenade badges, whether worn as a collar badge or elsewhere, lacked the scroll inscribed "Ubique" that was part of the regular Royal Artillery version. Militia Artillery units were made up of Militia officers and other ranks, with a Permanent Staff made up of seconded Royal Artillery officers and senior other ranks, including a single officer acting as both Commandant and Adjutant (where a suitably qualified Militia officer was unavailable to serve as Commandant), or only as Adjutant where the Commandant was a Militia officer.

Units from the Royal Engineers and Royal Artillery were in Australia, even after Federation.

=== 1900 to present day ===
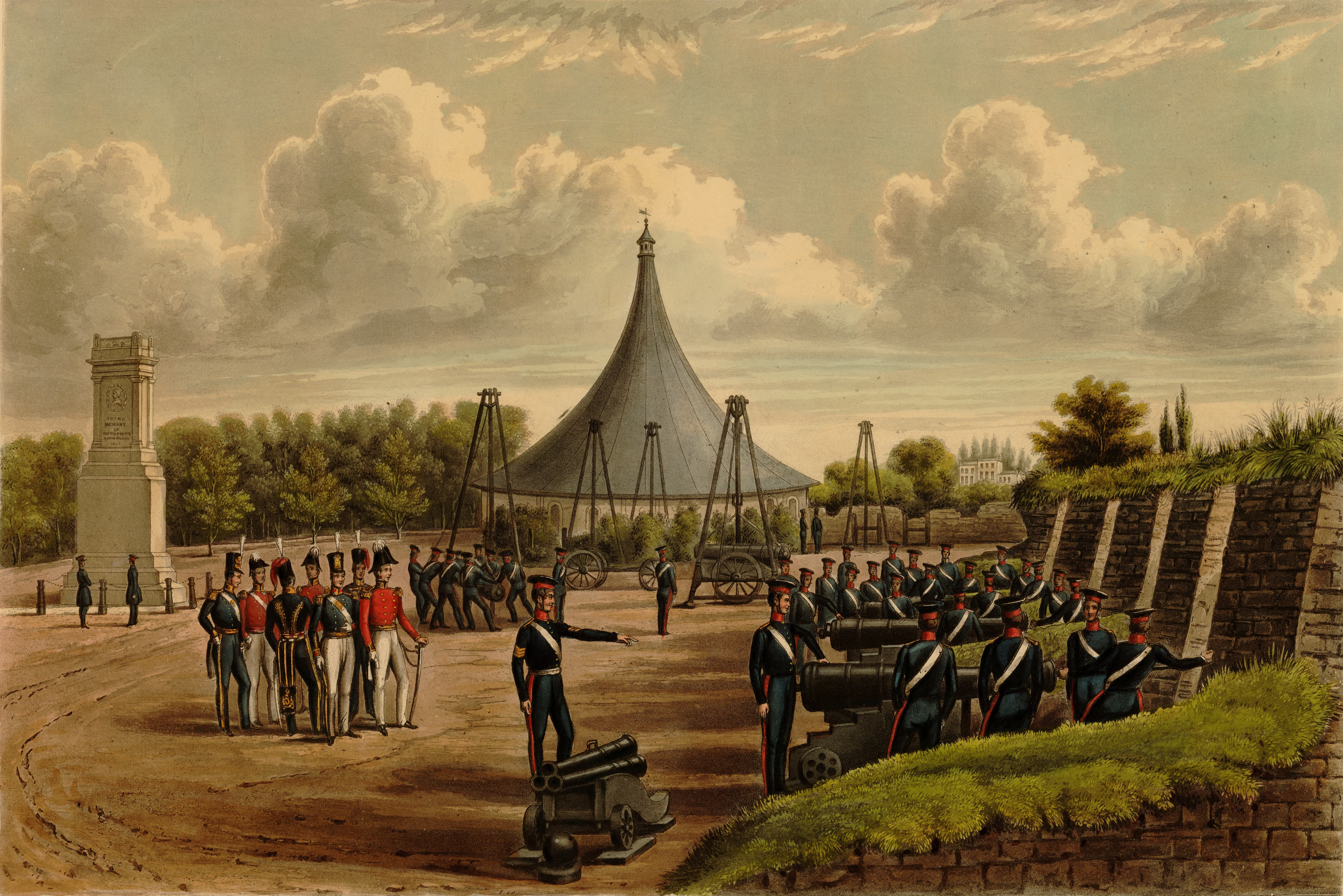
Royal Artillery repository exercises, 1844

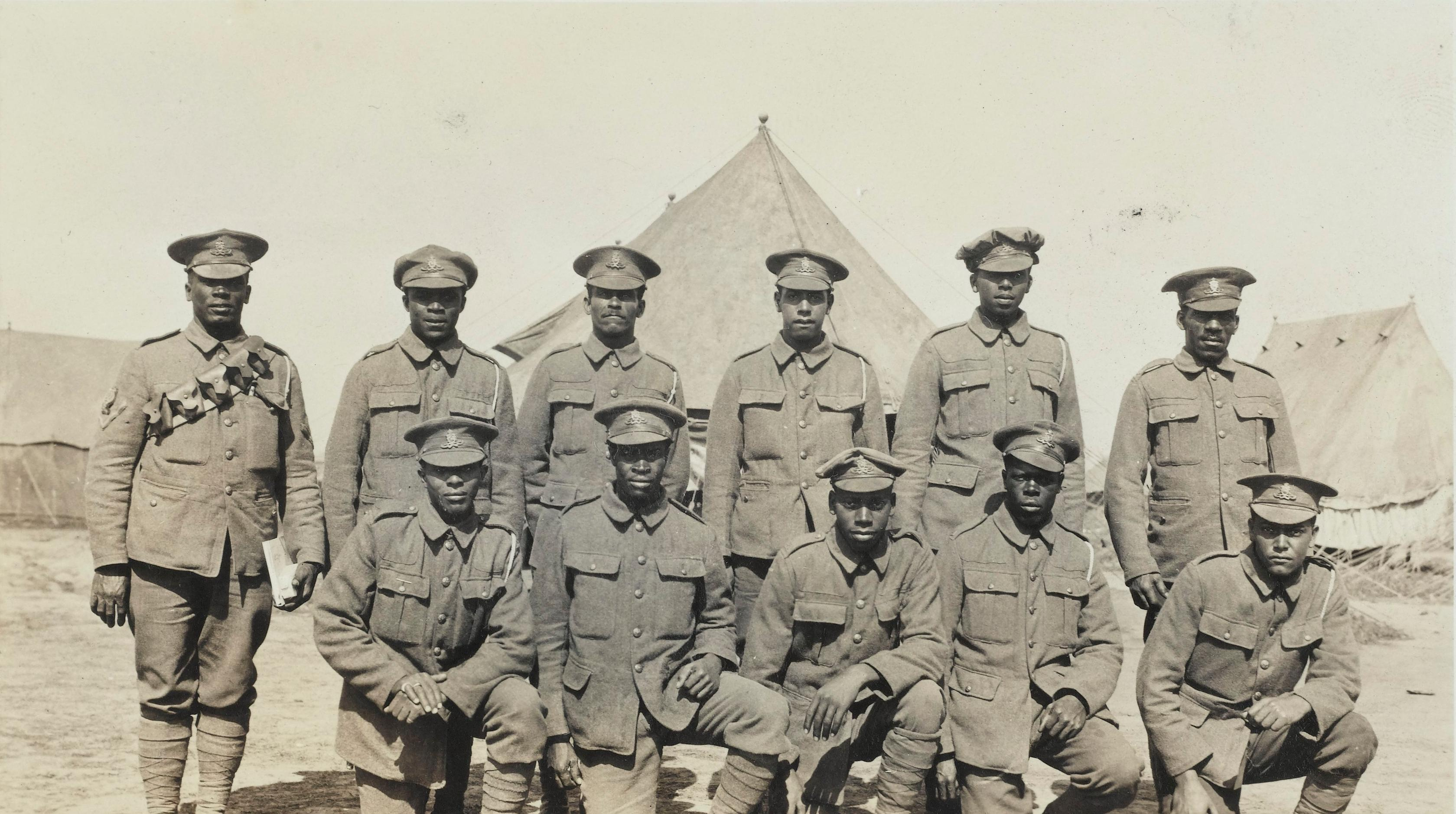
Soldiers of the Bermuda Contingent of the Royal Garrison Artillery in a Casualty Clearing Station in July, 1916

On 1 July 1899, the Royal Artillery was divided into three groups: the Royal Horse Artillery of 21 batteries and the Royal Field Artillery of 95 batteries composed one group, while the coastal defence, mountain, siege and heavy batteries were split off into another group named the Royal Garrison Artillery of 91 companies. The third group continued to be titled simply Royal Artillery, and was responsible for ammunition storage and supply. Which branch a gunner belonged to was indicated by metal shoulder titles (R.A., R.F.A., R.H.A., or R.G.A.). The RFA and RHA also dressed as mounted men, whereas the RGA dressed like foot soldiers. In 1920 the rank of Bombardier was instituted in the Royal Artillery.

Following the separation of the regular garrison companies into the Royal Garrison Artillery in 1899, the Militia Artillery units were re-titled accordingly in 1902 (by example, The Antrim Royal Garrison Artillery (Militia), which would usually be rendered Antrim R.G.A (M)). The badge adopted was the same as that of the regular Royal Regiment of Artillery, from that point including the "ubique" and "Quo Fas Et Gloria Ducunt" scrolls, with a letter "M" fixed at the bottom of the gun badge, and on the body of the grenade on the grenade badge (also with the "ubique" scroll), whether worn on the collar or on a cap. Alternately, Ubique was replaced on scrolls with the name of the city, county or colony for which the unit was named.

When the Volunteer Force and the Yeomanry in the United Kingdom (including the Volunteer Artillery) were merged to create the Territorial Force in 1908, the Militia was re-designated the Special Reserve. At the same time, plans were made to convert all of the Royal Garrison Artillery (Militia) units to Special Reserve Royal Field Artillery, but all Home units other than The Antrim Royal Garrison Artillery (Militia) (converted in 1956 to 74 (Antrim Artillery) Engineer Regiment (V)) were instead disbanded in 1909 (although Militia Artillery units remained in some of the colonies, and these were not re-designated as Special Reserve; The most notable of these was the Bermuda Militia Artillery, which, like the Bermuda Volunteer Rifle Corps, formed part of the garrison of the important Imperial fortress colony of Bermuda where the regular Royal Artillery had first posted a company in 1794, following the French Revolution). The remainder of the Special Reserve was re-designated as the Militia again after the First World War and permanently suspended. The Territorial Force was renamed the Territorial Army.

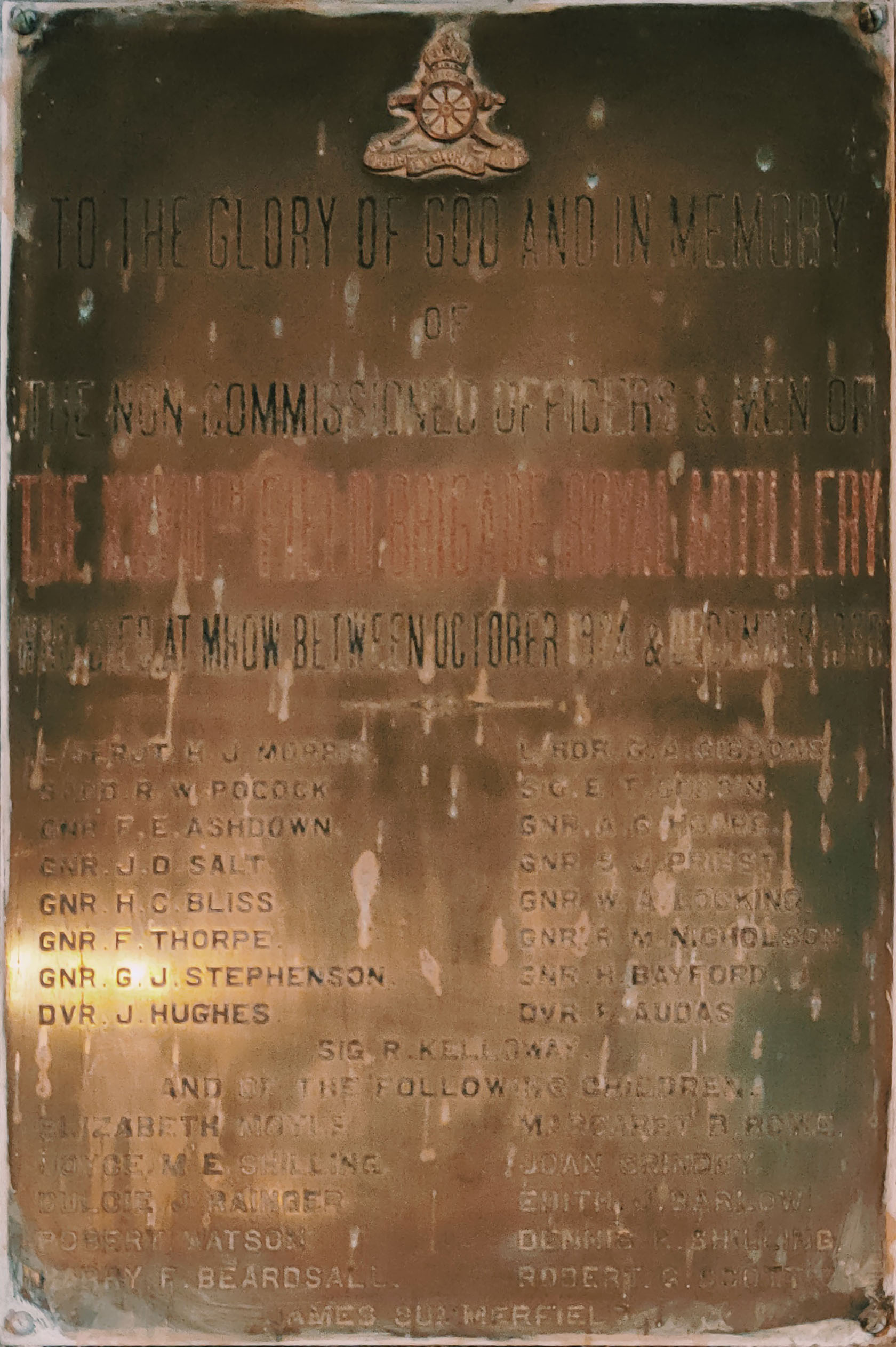
The 27th Field Brigade of the Royal Artillery was stationed at Mhow and created a memorial to their men, installed inside Christ Church, Mhow

The division of the Royal Regiment of Artillery lasted until 1924, when the RFA, RHA, and RGA amalgamated once more to become one regiment. In 1938, RA Brigades were renamed regiments. During the World War II there were over 1 million men serving in 960 gunner regiments. In 1947 the Riding Troop RHA was renamed the King's Troop Royal Horse Artillery and, in 1951, the title of the regiment's colonel-in-chief became Captain General. When The Queen first visited the Troop after her accession, it was expected that it would become "The Queen's Troop", but Her Majesty announced that in honour of her father's decision it would remain "The King's Troop".

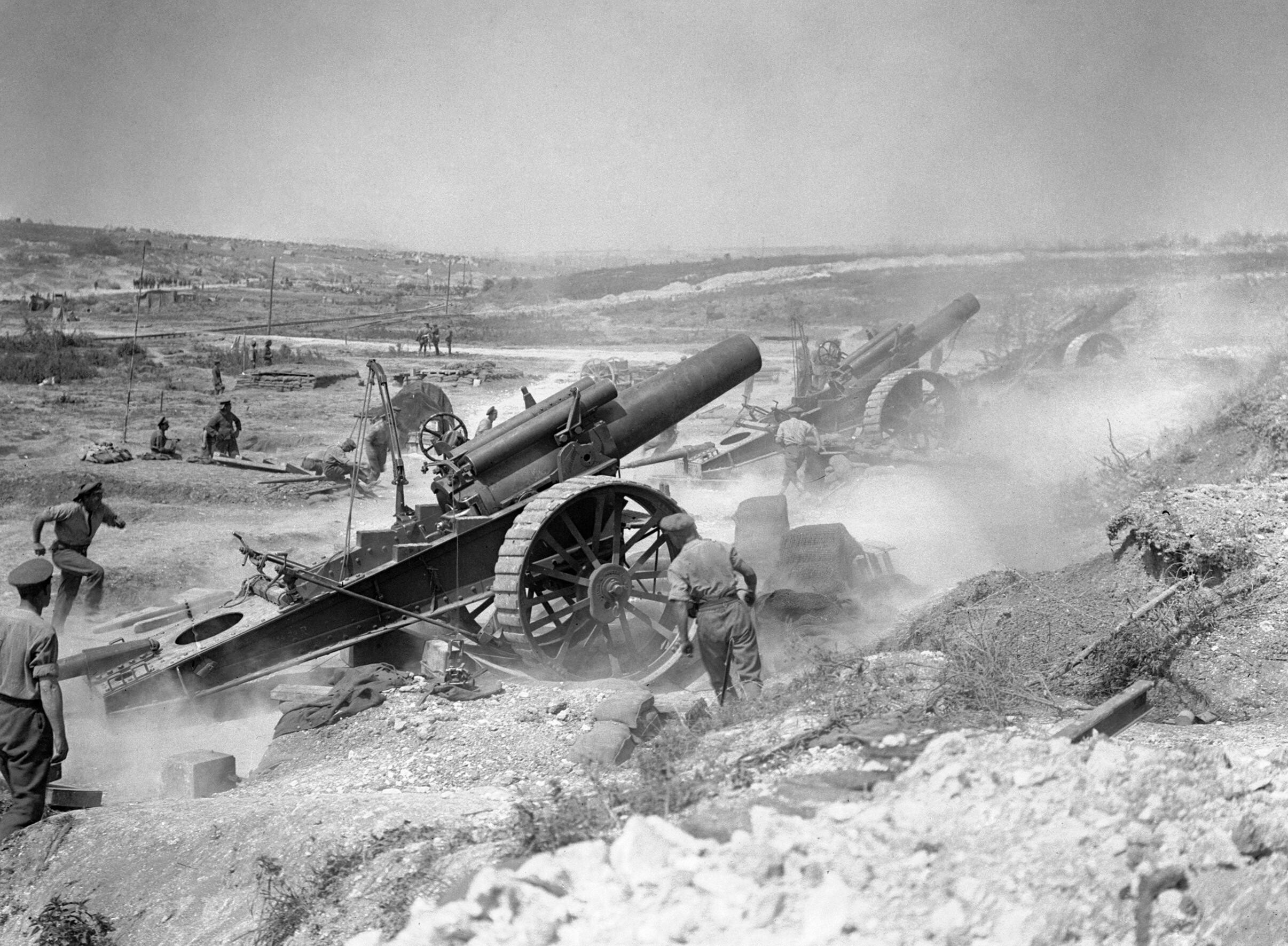
BL 8-inch Howitzer Mk 1 – 5 8 in (200 mm) howitzers of the 39th Siege Battery, Royal Garrison Artillery, in action near Fricourt in World War I.

The Royal Horse Artillery, which has separate traditions, uniforms and insignia, still retains a distinct identity within the regiment.

Before World War II, Royal Artillery recruits were required to be at least 5 feet 4 inches (1.63 m) tall. Men in mechanised units had to be at least 5 feet 8 inches (1.73 m) tall. They initially enlisted for six years with the colours and a further six years with the reserve or four years and eight years. They trained at the Royal Artillery Depot in Woolwich.

From its beginnings, the Royal Artillery has been based at Woolwich, in south-east London. In 2003 it was decided to move the headquarters to Larkhill in the Salisbury Plain Training Area in Wiltshire (the RA's training ground, where the Royal School of Artillery has been based since 1915). In 2012, however, the King's Troop, Royal Horse Artillery was relocated to Woolwich from their former headquarters in St John's Wood.

== The Royal Artillery today ==
The Royal Artillery is equipped with a variety of equipment and performs a wide range of roles, including:

- Surveillance and target acquisition/unmanned air systems
- Commando and airborne artillery
- Self-propelled artillery
- Multiple launch rocket systems
- Air defence

The Captain General of the regiment is King Charles III. The post was previously known as Colonel-in-Chief until King George VI expressed the desire to be known as Captain General. The head of the regiment is the Master Gunner, St. James's Park.

The Royal Regiment of Artillery comprises both Regular (full-time) and Reserve (part-time) units. The Royal Regiment of Artillery is unusual in that it has sub-units that often move between regiments, or are placed into suspended animation. See List of Royal Artillery Batteries.

=== Regular army ===
The Royal Regiment of Artillery comprises one ceremonial troop and 13 Regular Army regiments, and are designated by a number and the name Royal Artillery (RA) or Royal Horse Artillery (RHA):
Regular regiments of the Royal Horse Artillery

- King's Troop Royal Horse Artillery – His Majesty's Mounted Ceremonial Battery. A ceremonial unit equipped with 13 pounder guns for the firing of Royal Salutes. Now located in Woolwich Garrison.
- 1st Regiment Royal Horse Artillery – based in Larkhill Garrison.
- 3rd Regiment Royal Horse Artillery – (The Liverpool and Manchester Gunners) are equipped with Multiple Launch Rocket System (MLRS) based at Albemarle Barracks outside Newcastle-Upon-Tyne.
- 7th Parachute Regiment Royal Horse Artillery – (The Airborne Gunners) are equipped with L118 105 mm light guns and are currently held at Very High Readiness, as part of 16th Air Assault Brigade, based at Merville Barracks, Colchester.

Regular regiments of the Royal Artillery

- 4th Regiment Royal Artillery – (The North East Gunners) are equipped with L118 105 mm light guns at Alanbrooke Barracks in Topcliffe.
- 5th Regiment Royal Artillery – (The Yorkshire Gunners) are equipped with Surveillance and Target Acquisition assets and are based at Marne Barracks in Catterick, North Yorkshire.
- 12th Regiment Royal Artillery – (The Lancashire and Cumbrian Gunners) are the Army's Close Support Air Defence unit equipped with Starstreak HVM on the Self Propelled HVM Stormer armoured vehicle and are based at Baker Barracks, Thorney Island.
- 14th Regiment Royal Artillery – are the Training and Support Regiment based at Stirling Barracks in Larkhill Garrison.
- 16th Regiment Royal Artillery – (The London Invicta Gunners) are the Army's Medium Range Air Defence unit equipped with Sky Sabre and are based at Baker Barracks, Thorney Island.
- 19th Regiment Royal Artillery – (The Scottish Gunners) are equipped with ARCHER Wheeled self-propelled howitzer, and MSTAR radar at Larkhill Garrison.
- 26th Regiment Royal Artillery – (The West Midland Gunners) are equipped with Multiple Launch Rocket System (MLRS) and Exactor 2 at Larkhill Garrison.
- 29th Commando Regiment Royal Artillery – (The Commando Gunners) are equipped with the L118 105 mm light guns, and are currently part of UK Commando Force. Most batteries are currently based at the Royal Citadel, Plymouth, with one battery (148 (Meiktila) Battery) based at RM Poole and 7 (Sphinx) Battery based at RM Condor, Arbroath.
- 32nd Regiment Royal Artillery – (The Wessex Gunners) are equipped with Unmanned Aerial Systems and are based in Roberts Barracks in Larkhill.
- 47th Regiment Royal Artillery – (The Hampshire and Sussex Gunners) are equipped with Unmanned Aerial Systems and are based in Horne Barracks in Larkhill.

=== Army Reserve ===
- 100th (Yeomanry) Regiment Royal Artillery – A specialist pool of gunnery instructors, naval gunfire liaison officers, forward air controllers and personnel supporting formation headquarters in the Army, all divisions and most brigades. Based at Royal Artillery Barracks, Woolwich Garrison with batteries in Larkhill Garrison and Bath.
- 101st (Northumbrian) Regiment Royal Artillery – Equipped with Multiple Launch Rocket System (MLRS) and paired with 26 Regiment RA. Has batteries in Gateshead, Blyth, Newcastle, Hexham, South Shields, Catterick, and Leeds.
- 103rd (Lancashire Artillery Volunteers) Regiment Royal Artillery – Equipped with L118 105 mm light guns. Has batteries in St Helens, Bolton, Liverpool, Manchester, Bulwell, and Wolverhampton
- 104th Regiment Royal Artillery – Equipped with L118 105 mm light guns. Has batteries in Newport, Abertillery, Bristol, Worcester, and Plymouth.
- 105th Regiment Royal Artillery – (The Scottish & Ulster Gunners) are equipped with L118 105 mm light guns. Has batteries in Edinburgh, Newtownards, Coleraine, Glasgow, Arbroath, Kirkcaldy, Shetland, and Livingston.
- 106th (Yeomanry) Regiment Royal Artillery – The Army's only Reserve Air Defence unit. Equipped with the Starstreak HVM missile and currently a part of 7th Air Defence Group, with batteries in Grove Park, Portsmouth, and Southampton.

== Equipment ==
=== Air defence ===
The Royal Artillery utilises two air defence weapons:

- Sky Sabre - Operated by the 7th Air Defence Group since 2021, replacing Rapier. This system consists of Land Ceptor missiles, SAAB Giraffe AMB radars and Rafael Advanced Defense Systems Modular Integrated C4I Air & Missile Defense System (MIC4AD), all mounted on MAN trucks.
- Starstreak HVM – Starstreak HVM is a very short range air defence (VSHORAD) system that is a continuation of the Blowpipe and Javelin series. It is operated as either a shoulder-launched weapon, in the lightweight multiple launcher mode, or mounted on the Alvis Stormer armoured vehicle. The weapon is operated by 12 Regiment RA and 106 Regiment RA.

=== Close support artillery ===
The Royal Artillery field the following close support/offensive support weapons:

- M270 MLRS – The multiple launch rocket system provides a precision fire capability out to 150km with the Guided MLRS Extended Range (GMLRS-ER) missile. Operated by 26 Regiment RA and 101 Regiment RA, and 3 Regiment RHA, which reroled in 2023 to the MLRS.
- L118 light gun – The light gun is a 105 mm gun. It is operated by 4th Regiment RA, 7th (Para) Regiment RHA, 29 (Commando) Regt RA, as well as three Army Reserve regiments – 103 Regiment RA, 104 Regiment RA and 105 Regiment RA.
- Exactor (Spike NLOS) – A vehicle-mounted high-precision guided missile. It is currently solely operated by 26th Regiment RA since 2020.
- Archer – Deal with Sweden announced on 16 March 2023 to replace part of the 32 AS-90 transferred to Ukraine, systems operational from April 2023. It is an interim replacement before RCH 155 reaches full operational capability (FOC) in 2030.
- RCH 155 – Future self propelled howitzer mounted on a Boxer MIV, to be in service by the end of the decade and will replace the AS-90.

=== Intelligence, surveillance, target acquisition and reconnaissance (ISTAR) ===
- TAIPAN – Replacing MAMBA – is an artillery hunting radar that is used by 5th Regiment RA for counter-battery operations, locating an increased number of targets at greater range with reduced electronic warfare signatures.
- ASP (advanced sound-ranging program) – is an acoustic triangulation system that used a series of sensor posts (microphones) to triangulate the point of origin and point of impact of enemy mortars and artillery. It is operated by 5th Regiment RA.
- Desert Hawk III UAV – the DH3 is a hand-launched UAV. It is operated by 32 Regiment RA.

=== Ceremonial ===
- 13 pounder – The King's Troop, Royal Horse Artillery retains six operational First World War-era QF 13 pounders for use as state saluting guns.

== List of obsolete weapon and equipment ==
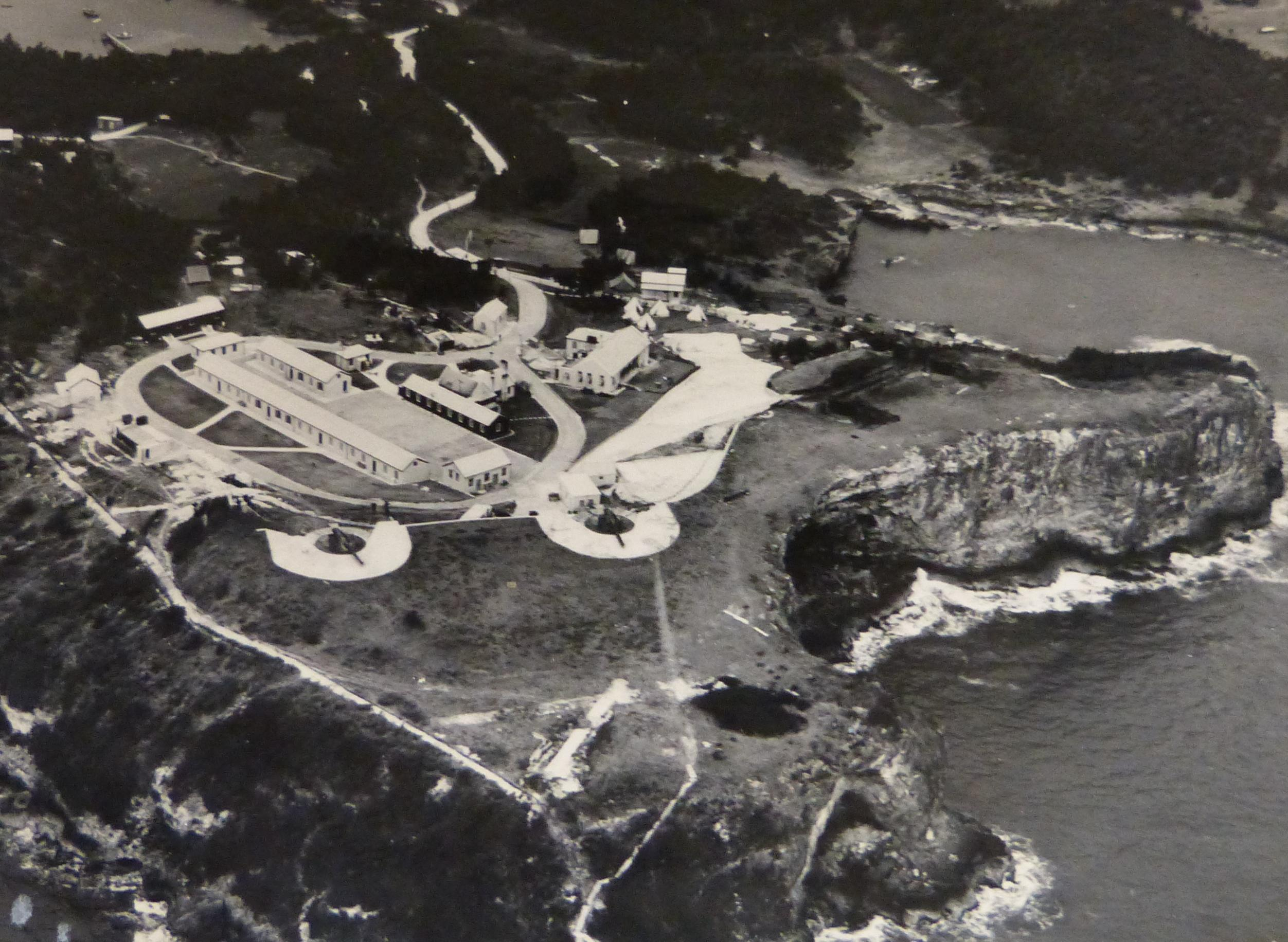
St. David's Battery, Bermuda in 1942, completed in 1910 with two 9.2" and two 6" coastal artillery guns

=== Surface-to-air missiles ===
- Blowpipe
- Javelin
- Starburst
- Thunderbird
- Rapier

=== Unmanned aerial vehicles ===
- BAE Systems Phoenix – operated by the 32nd Regiment Royal Artillery from 1999 to 2008.
- Canadair CL-89 Midge
- Radioplane BTT
- Black Hornet Nano
- Honeywell RQ-16 T-Hawk
- Thales Watchkeeper WK450

== Nuclear weapons 1950s–1990s ==
=== Surface-to-surface tactical ballistic missiles ===
- Corporal – In service with the 27th and 47th Guided Weapons Regiment RA from 1954 to 1966. See Project E
- Honest John – In service with the 24th, 39th, 47th and 50 Missile Regiment Royal Artillery from 1960 to 1977.
- Lance – In service with the 50 Missile Regiment Royal Artillery from 1976 to 1993.

=== Nuclear capable artillery ===
- 155-mm M109 howitzer
- 203-mm (8-inch) M110 howitzer – See Project E
- 203-mm (8-inch) M115 howitzer

=== Nuclear artillery shells ===
- W33 – In service until 1992. See Project E
- W48

== Colonel commandants ==
The Royal Artillery, due to its size, has 11 colonel commandants and a master gunner concurrently. These are:

- Major General Neil Marshall, OBE
- Major General Robert Weighill, CBE
- Major General Jeremy Bennett, CBE
- Brigadier Ian Harrison, CBE
- Colonel Barry Jenkins
- Major General Richard M. Clements, CBE 1 June 2023
- Colonel L. M. Forbes, TD VR 1 June 2023
- Brigadier B. W. Bennett, CBE 1 January 2024
- Brigadier M. N. Pountain, CBE 1 January 2024
- Brigadier S. C. Williams, OBE 1 January 2024
- Colonel J. A. B. Kinloch, TD 1 January 2024
- Colonel S. O. Thomas, CBE 1 January 2024
- Major General Mark Pullan, CBE 1 November 2026

Lieutenant-General Michael Elviss is Master Gunner, St James's Park from 1 November 2025

== Order of precedence ==
Royal Horse Artillery

Preceded by Household Cavalry	Order of Precedence	Succeeded by Royal Armoured Corps

Royal Artillery

Preceded by Royal Armoured Corps	Order of Precedence	Succeeded by Corps of Royal Engineers

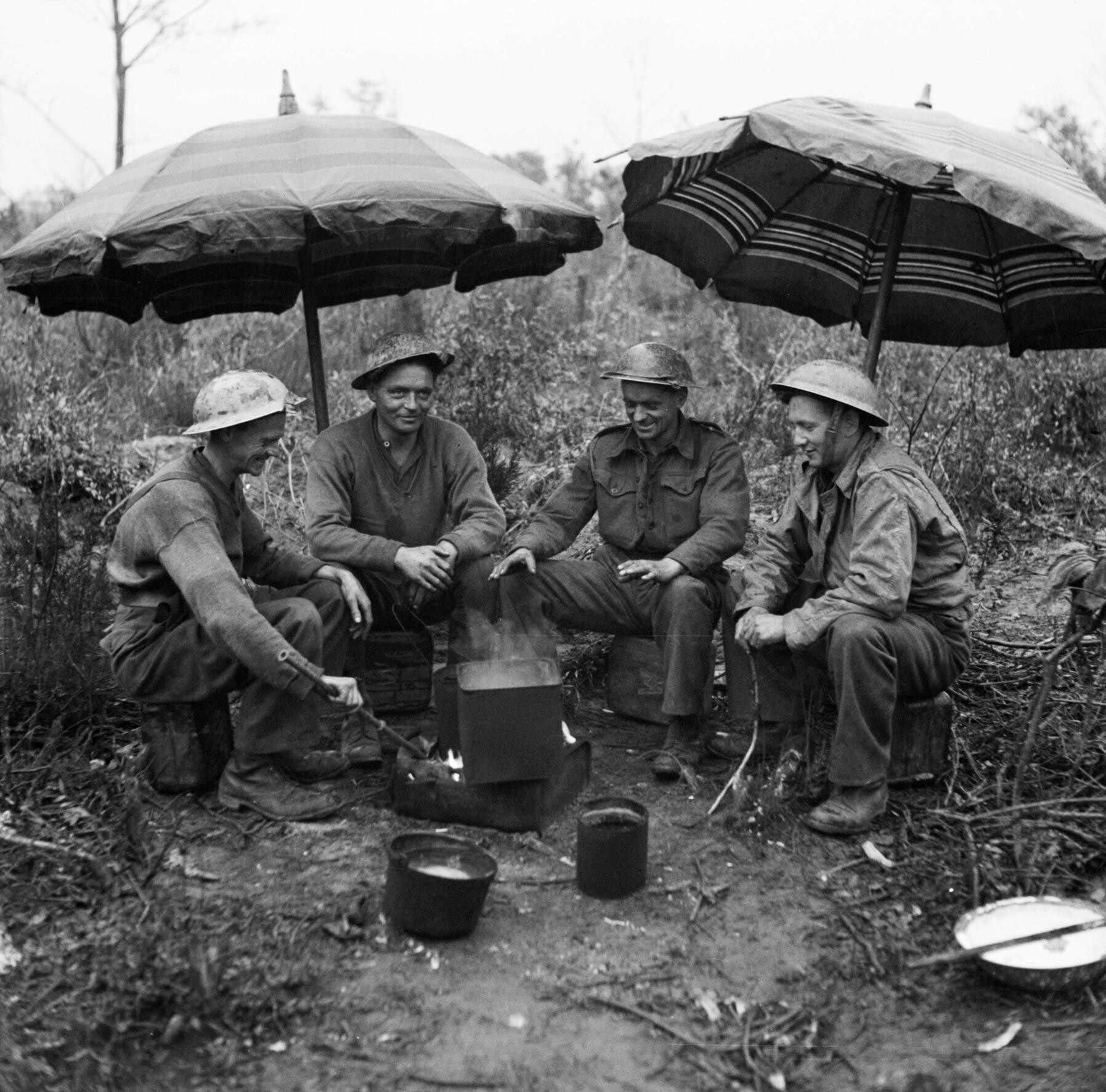
Gunners of the 78th Field Regiment, Royal Artillery make use of two sunshades from a cafe to keep the rain off while making a brew, Anzio, Italy, 27 February 1944.

In the British Army Order of Precedence, the Household Cavalry is always listed first and always parades at the extreme right of the line. However, when the Royal Horse Artillery is on parade with its guns it will replace the Household Cavalry at the extreme right of the line.

== Museum ==
The Regimental museum, "Firepower" located in the Royal Arsenal at Woolwich closed in 2016.

== Affiliations ==
- Canada – Royal Regiment of Canadian Artillery
- Australia – Royal Regiment of Australian Artillery
- New Zealand – Royal Regiment of New Zealand Artillery
- India – Regiment of Artillery
- Pakistan – Regiment of Artillery
- Sri Lanka – Sri Lanka Artillery
- Singapore – Singapore Volunteer Artillery
- Malta – Armed Forces of Malta
- Malaysia – Rejimen Artileri Diraja
- Gibraltar – The Royal Gibraltar Regiment
- South Africa – South African Artillery Formation

The Royal Artillery have a traditional rivalry with the Royal Engineers (the Sappers).

== See also ==
- List of Royal Artillery Batteries
- Artillery
- Honourable Artillery Company
- Royal Artillery Mounted Band
- Royal Artillery Band
- Royal Artillery Memorial
- Royal Artillery Barracks
- Royal School of Artillery
- Firepower – The Royal Artillery Museum
- Bermuda Militia Artillery
- Royal Malta Artillery
- Royal Regiment of Canadian Artillery
- Royal Regiment of Australian Artillery
- Royal Regiment of New Zealand Artillery
- Manx Regiment
- List of vehicles used by the British Army
