= 29th Commando Regiment Royal Artillery =

British Army commando artillery regiment

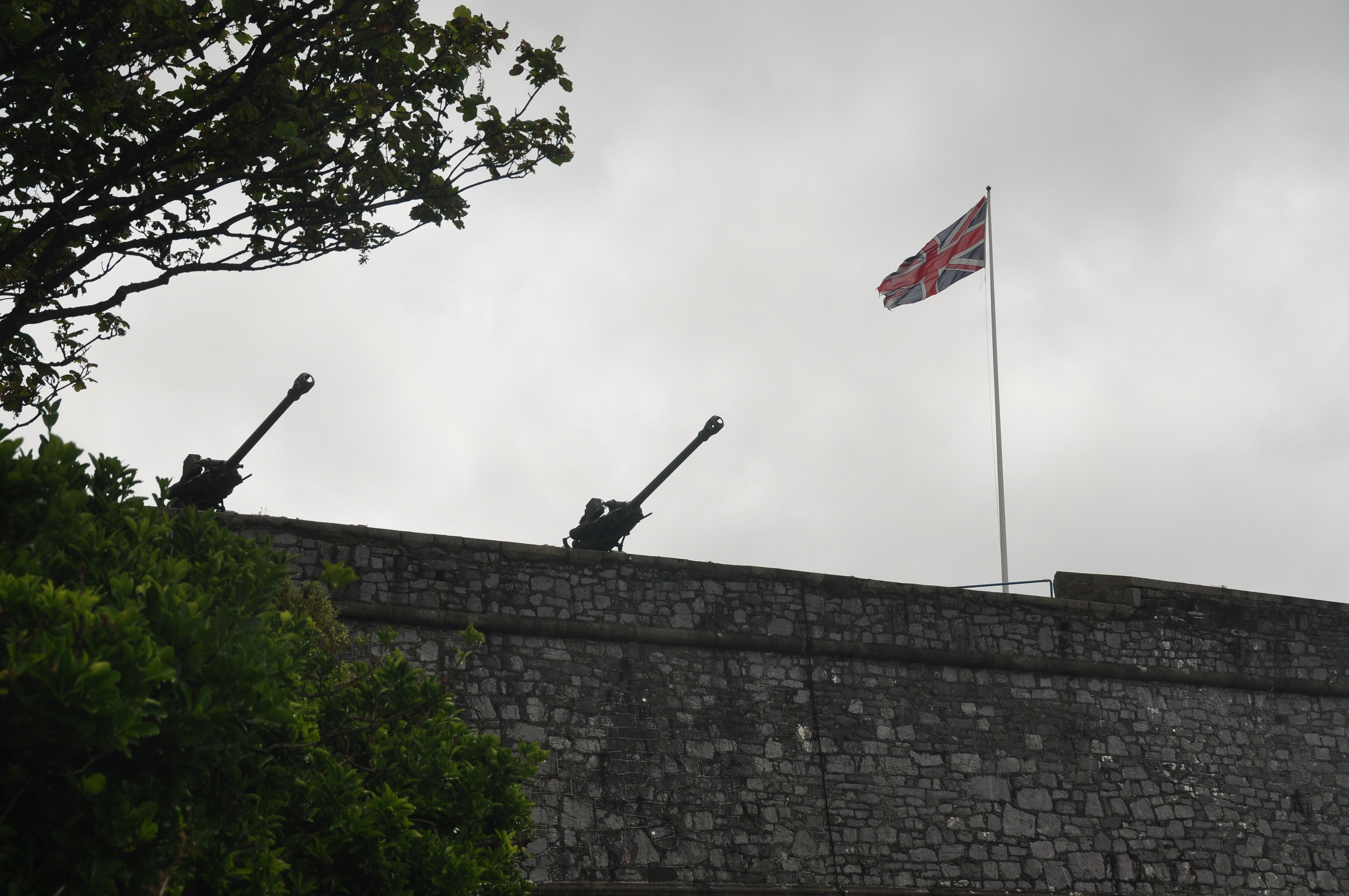
- Guns of 29 Commando Regiment at the Royal Citadel, Plymouth
- Active: 1947 – Present
- Allegiance: United Kingdom
- Branch: British Army
- Role: Field artillery
- Size: 5 Batteries; 430 personnel
- Part of: UK Commando Force
- Garrison/HQ: Royal Citadel, Plymouth
- Nickname: The Commando gunners
- Equipment: L118 Light Gun
- Engagements: Operation Vantage; Falklands War; Mount Kent Skirmish; Battle of Wireless Ridge; Battle of Goose Green

Commanders
- Current commander: Lieutenant Colonel Mark Alexander Alford Dornan RA

29th Commando Regiment Royal Artillery is the Commando-trained unit of the British Army's Royal Artillery, based in Plymouth. The regiment is under the operational control of the UK Commando Force, to which it provides artillery support and gunnery observation.

== History ==
The regiment was established in 1947 by the redesignation of the 25th Field Regiment. In 1951, it was renamed as the 29th Medium Regiment Royal Artillery and was based at Brancepeth Camp in Durham. In 1957, it was deployed to Cyprus on internal security duties, and spent three years at Karlaos Camp, near Famagusta. By now it had reverted to a field regiment, at one point loaning its 25-pounder field guns to another regiment that was hurriedly deployed with a United Nations force to Lebanon and Jordan. In late 1960 the regiment exchanged with 42 Field Regiment and on return to the UK took over that regiment's guns and station at the Royal Citadel, Plymouth.

In June 1961, Abd al-Karim Qasim's Iraqi Republic announced its intention to annex newly-independent Kuwait, and a British military force was hurriedly sent to the kingdom in Operation Vantage. Regimental Headquarters (RHQ), 79 (Kirkee) and 145 (Maiwand) batteries of 29 Field Regiment were flown without their guns to Kuwait City. 25-Pounder guns and 3-tonner lorries arrived a few days later by sea from the strategic reserve at Aden. The regiment moved up close to the border with Iraq and established gun positions and observation posts (OPs). The threatened invasion did not happen, and in October the British force was relieved by the Arab League. 29 Field Regiment moved back to Aden to await sea transport to Plymouth.

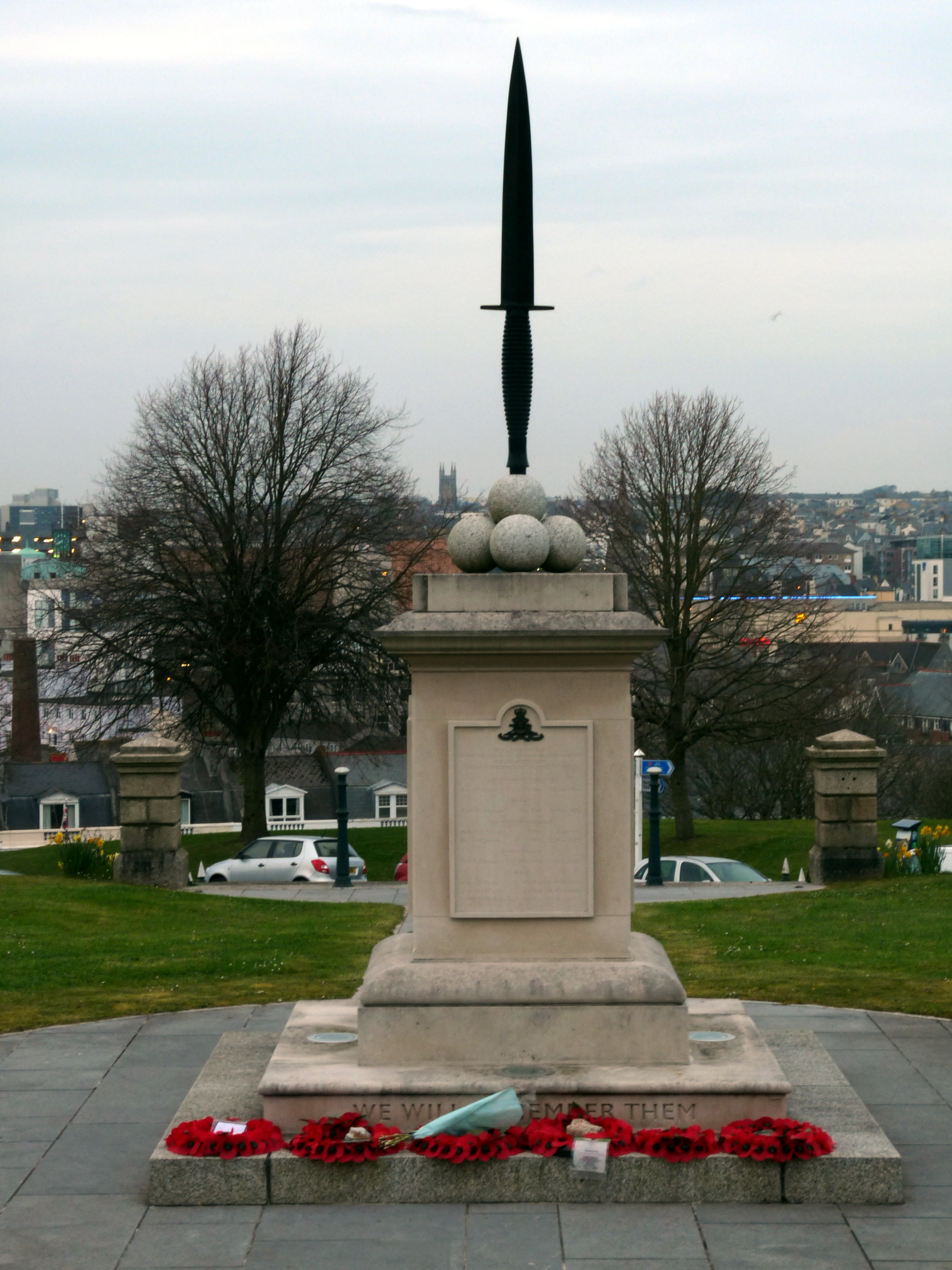
29 Commando Regiment Memorial on Plymouth Hoe.

In 1962, the regiment re-roled and became 29 Commando Light Regiment, Royal Artillery. At that time, each battery consisted of four 105mm pack howitzers (Italian Mountain Gun).

In the 1970s, batteries from the regiment completed operational tours in Northern Ireland.

During the 1982 Falklands War, 29 Commando Regiment accompanied the Royal Marines, providing much needed close support with their L118 Light Guns.

In 1996, the honorary Freedom of the City of Plymouth was conferred on the regiment, with the unanimous support of Plymouth City Council.

The regiment conducted numerous operational tours in Afghanistan to provide artillery support during operations against Al Qaeda and Taliban militants. A war memorial to the fallen of 29 Commando Regiment in post-1945 conflicts was unveiled on Plymouth Hoe on 16 January 2011; It features a Commando dagger made from shells used in the Afghanistan conflict.

== Organisation ==
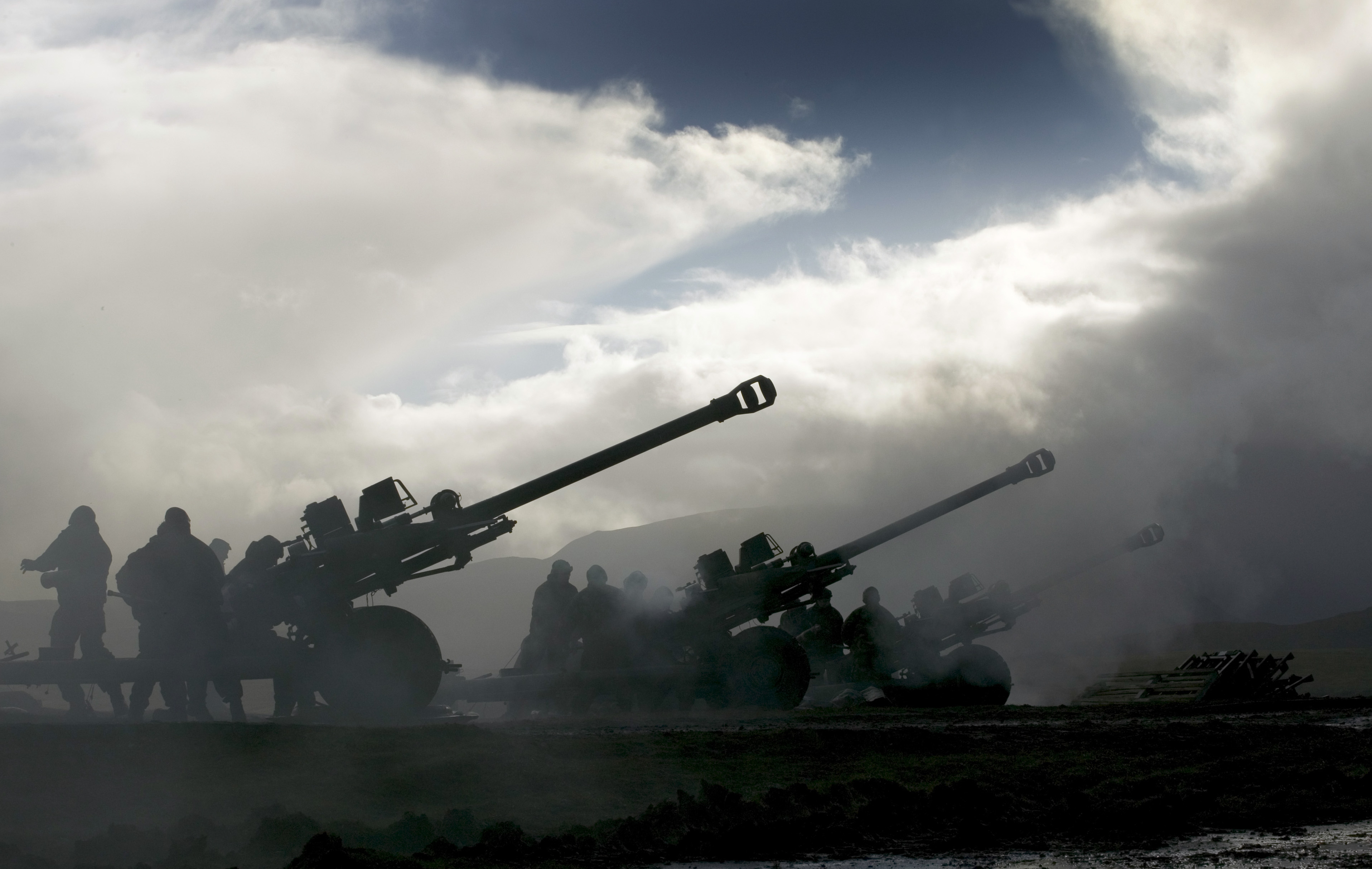
Practice firings by 7 (Sphinx) Commando Battery on exercise near Cape Wrath in Scotland.

The present regiment consists of a HQ battery, three gun batteries, a Naval Gunfire Support Forward Observation battery and an attached Royal Electrical and Mechanical Engineers workshop, which includes a Royal Logistic Corps stores section. The gun batteries are equipped with six L118 105mm light guns and three OPs each. The batteries are as follows:

- 7 (Sphinx) Battery Royal Artillery – Commando trained L118 gun battery based at the Royal Citadel, Plymouth
- 8 (Alma) Commando Battery Royal Artillery – Commando trained L118 gun battery based at the Royal Citadel, Plymouth
- 23 (Gibraltar 1779–1783) Commando Battery Royal Artillery – Headquarters Commando Battery, and Radar Troop, for 29 Commando Regiment based at the Royal Citadel, Plymouth
- 79 (Kirkee) Commando Battery Royal Artillery – is a Commando trained GBAD battery based at the Royal Citadel, Plymouth
- 148 (Meiktila) Battery Royal Artillery – Naval Gunfire Support Forward Observation (NGSFO) battery based at RM Poole. Tasked to direct naval gunfire support from Royal Navy ships, air strikes from Royal Navy and Royal Air Force aircraft and artillery fire from the regiment's gun batteries, when landed in support of UK Commando Force. The battery is attached to Surveillance Reconnaissance Squadron (SRS) 30 Commando Information Exploitation Group
- 29 Commando Regiment Workshop Royal Electrical and Mechanical Engineers – Workshop main HQ is based at the Royal Citadel, Plymouth, with battery fitter sections permanently attached to, and based with, each battery.
- 289 Commando Battery (TA) Royal Artillery – Commando Trained L118 gun battery based at East Ham London. (Disbanded 1999)

== Gallery ==
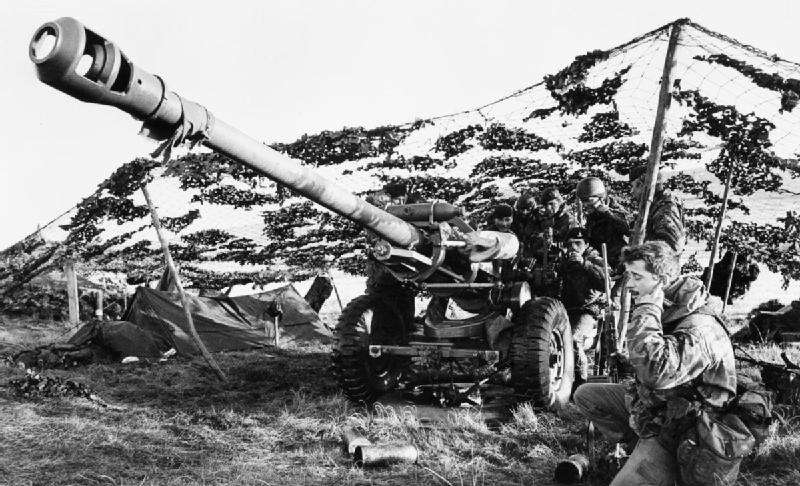
A 105 mm light gun of 29 Commando Regiment sited between Fitzroy and Bluff Cove in the Falkland Islands, June 1982.

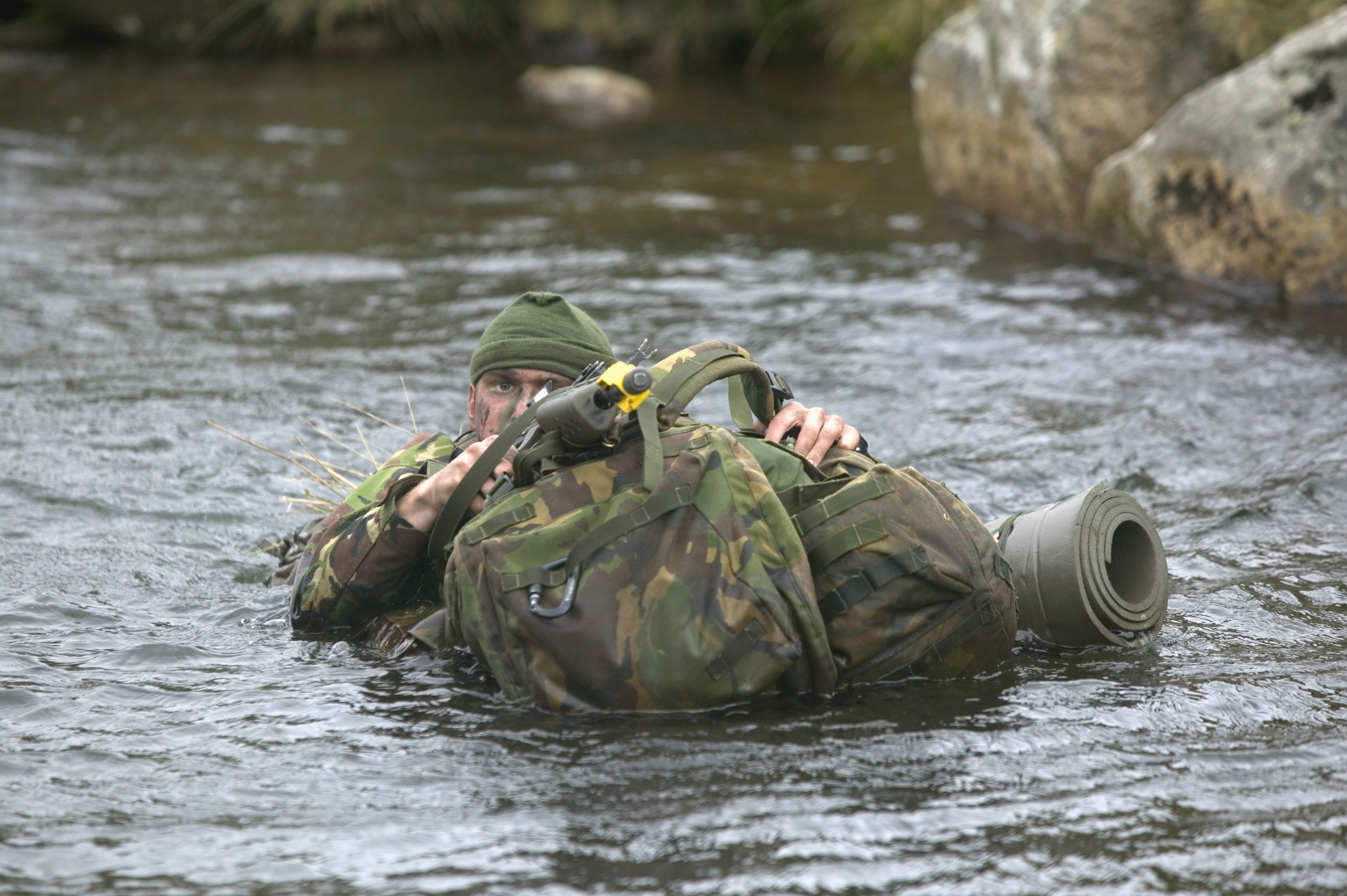
A gunner from 29 Commando Regiment, during a Commando Conditioning Course on Dartmoor, 2006.

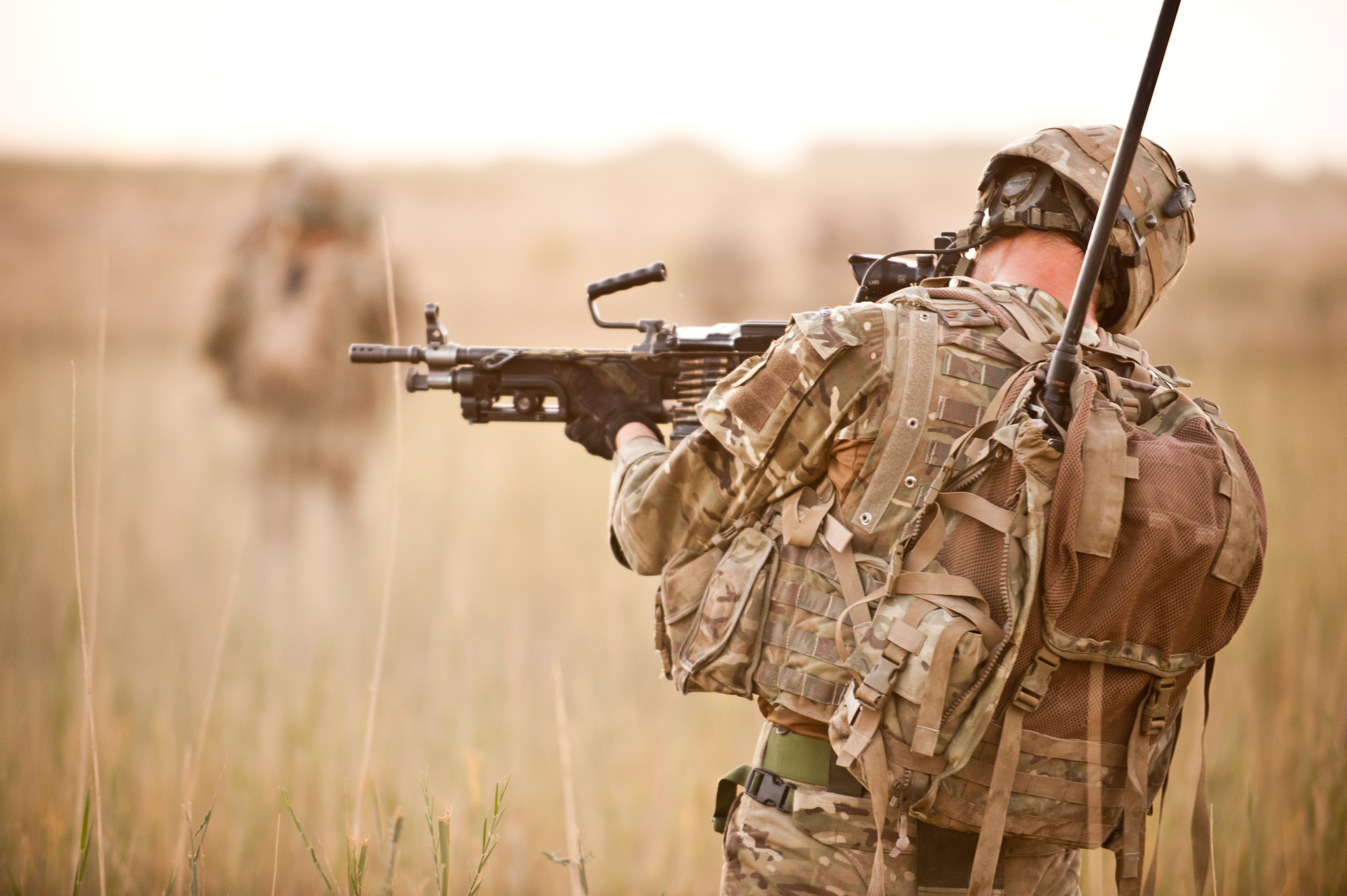
A gunner of 29 Commando Regiment in Helmand province, Afghanistan, September 2011.

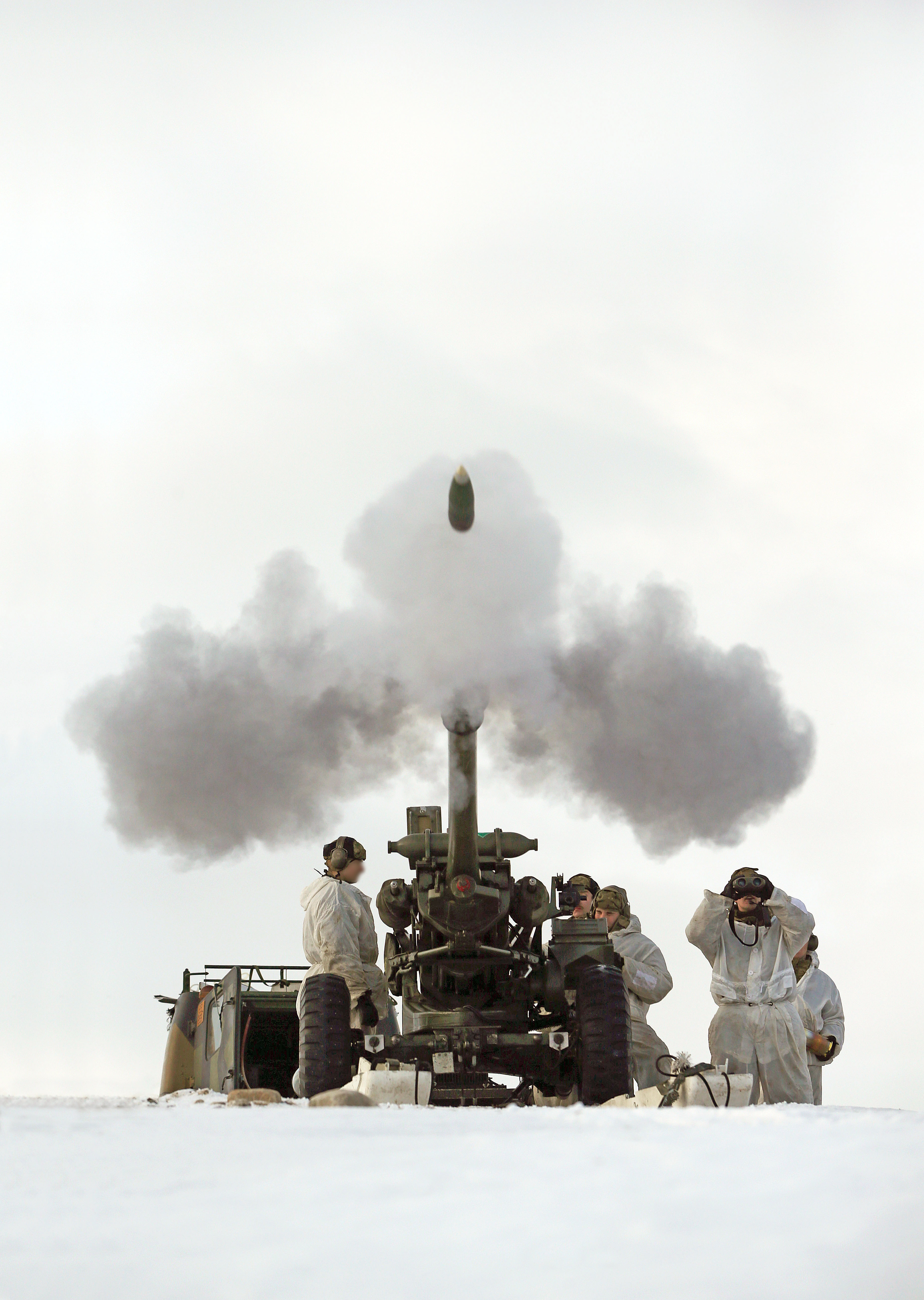
Soldiers of 29 Commando Regiment Firing a 105mm Light Gun on exercise in Norway, February 2014.

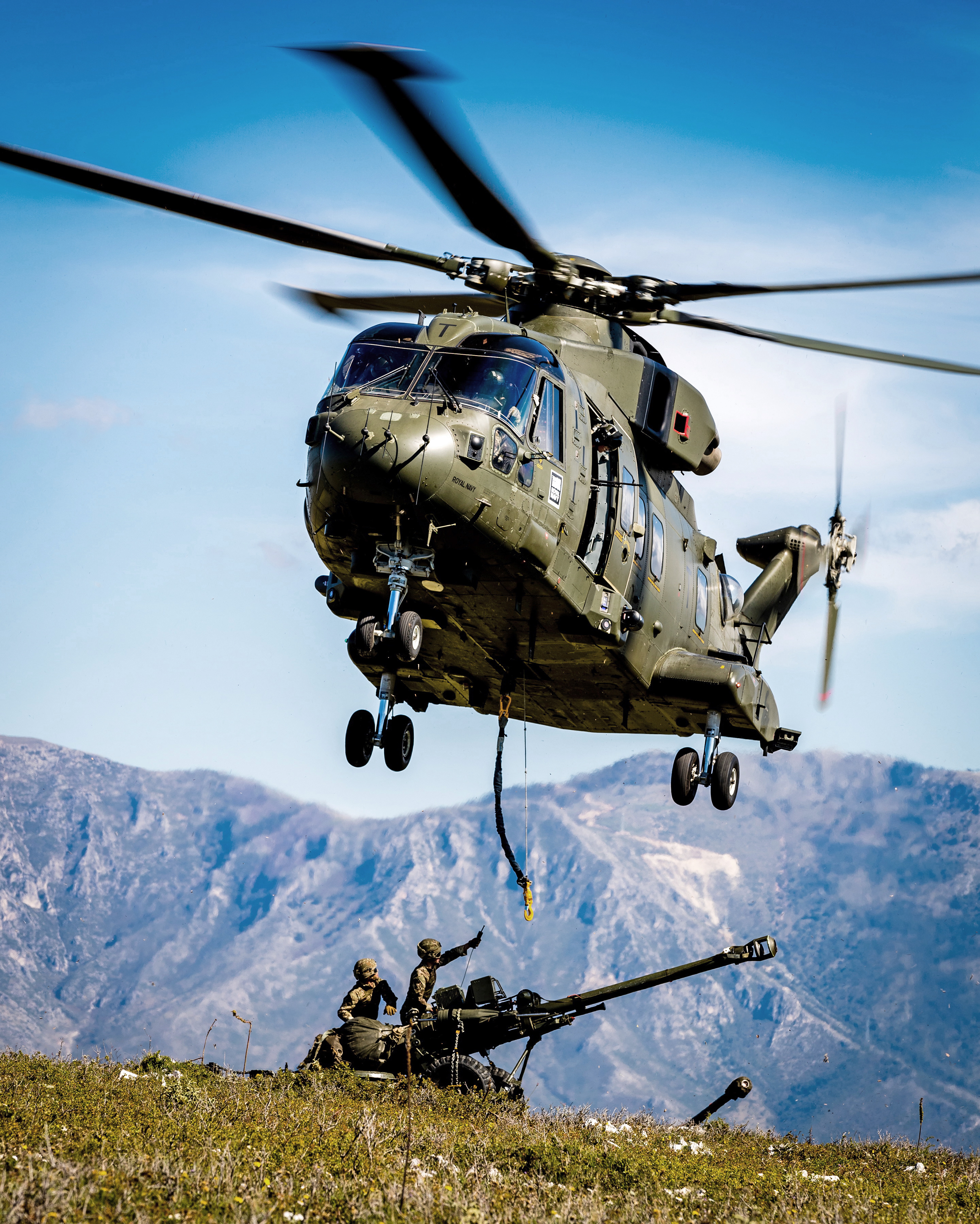
8 (Alma) Commando Battery, operating from HMS Ocean during Joint Expeditionary Force (Maritime) operations in the Mediterranean, October 2016.
