= 148 (Meiktila) Battery Royal Artillery =

British Army commando artillery battery

- Country: United Kingdom
- Branch: British Army
- Type: Artillery
- Role: Naval Gunfire Support
- Size: Battery
- Part of: 29 Commando Regiment Royal Artillery
- Garrison/HQ: RM Poole
- Patron: Saint Barbara
- Mottos: "Ubique", "Quo Fas Et Gloria Ducunt" (Everywhere, Where Right And Glory Lead)
- Colours: .
- Anniversaries: Meiktila Day 3 March

148 (Meiktila) Commando Forward Observation Battery is a specialist Naval Gunfire Support Forward Observation (NGSFO) unit within 29 Commando Regiment Royal Artillery of UK Commando Force Royal Marines.

The unit provides Fire Support Teams (FST - formerly called Forward Observation parties) to control and co-ordinate Naval fires (naval gunfire support, naval air delivered guided and unguided munitions) from Royal Navy and allied ships, land based air delivered munitions and artillery fire from the gun batteries of 29 Commando Regiment Royal Artillery, when ashore in support of 3 Commando Brigade. In support of this role, the battery provides FSTs to the Royal Navy when conducting training on a variety of gunnery ranges around the world.

148 Battery's FSTs comprise gunners of the Royal Artillery, already qualified members of the regiment when posted into the battery, augmented by Royal Navy communications personnel (signallers) who are required to undergo the All Arms Commando Course. All personnel within the battery are also parachute trained. The battery is supported by a Battery Fitter Section from 29 Regiment's attached Royal Electrical and Mechanical Engineers Workshop, also commando qualified. The battery and its Battery Fitter Section are based at RM Poole in Dorset.

== History ==
=== Formation ===
Originally formed during the Second World War, the unit eventually evolved into the 95 Forward Observation Unit (95 FOU). In 1975 the unit was reduced to its current size and co-located with the SBS at RM Poole. It was tasked with providing FO teams to the Royal Marines, the Parachute Regiment; the ACE Mobile Force (Land) (AMF(L)) and the SBS. The smaller sized unit soon found it was unable to meet its many obligations.

=== The Falklands War ===
After the Argentine invasion of the Falklands, the unit deployed to the South Atlantic where it operated alongside both the SAS and SBS. The skills of the Commando-trained unit were in high demand as commanders re-discovered their usefulness. FO teams were relocated about the islands as the British advanced on the capital at Port Stanley.

Three British civilians in Port Stanley were killed by British naval gunfire controlled by the unit, when a ships' gun beacon MIP radar malfunctioned. The three women were sheltering in a part of the town which the FO team officer had been briefed was free of civilians. The FO team were themselves in a very exposed position to the north of the town. The FO officer calculated the ship's error, but the ship's computer system did not indicate anything wrong, so after three rounds were fired the FO officer dismissed the ship from the firing line. The ship's weapons staff spent the next 24 hours going through their system, and discovered their radar had not locked onto the correct datum point, creating an error in firing equal to that calculated by the FO officer. The Argentine military command were very quick to announce this error as a deliberate act of aggression towards the Islanders. The FO team, which was still conducting covert reconnaissance and bombardment, learned of the tragedy from the BBC World Service.

FO teams called artillery fire and air strikes onto Argentine positions in support of every major British assault. With the Argentine surrender, the unit returned to their home in Poole.

=== Persian Gulf 1991 ===
148 provided teams initially in Northern Iraq and later assisted in the Scud missile hunt.

=== Yugoslav Wars ===
148 provided fire support to various British formations.

=== Iraq ===
3 Commando Brigade conducted an amphibious landing to occupy the Al Faw Peninsula during Operation Telic, the 2003 invasion of Iraq. On the first night of the operation the unit suffered its first deaths of the war when a US Marine helicopter crashed close to the Iraq Border.

=== Afghanistan ===
Lance Bombardier Ross Clark aged 25 from South Africa, and Lance Bombardier Liam McLaughlin, aged 21 from Lancashire, were killed during a rocket attack in the Sangin area of Helmand province on 3 March 2007.

== Battery structure ==
The battery is formed into a number of Fire Support Teams (FSTs), operating ashore or in advance of the Forward Edge of Battle Area, to observe and identify candidate targets, conduct preliminary Battle Damage Assessment, adjust fire or provide target illumination for laser guided weapons.

The battery consists of HQ personnel, Fire Support Teams and administrative and logistical support personnel.

A FST consists of five personnel; a patrol commander (a Captain Royal Artillery), with a Bombardier RA as the second in command (2IC). The rest of the team consists of a (Royal Navy) communicator, RA Lance Bombardier, and Gunner. The team can be split in two with the Bombardier commanding one team and the Captain the other. All unit members are capable of co-ordinating air strikes and directing artillery fire.

== Selection and introductory training ==
Volunteers for the battery must first complete the All Arms Commando Course, and a basic parachute course. After Commando qualification, unless already Observation Post qualified, they then undergo six months of basic Gunnery Control training and Observation Post operations. Personnel are trained in infiltration and exfiltration, covert observation, target identification and location, voice and data communications, adjusting gunfire from both afloat and ashore, and Forward Air Control (FAC) techniques. Upon completion of the course a new Naval Gunfire Assistant (NGA) will be assigned to a Forward Observation team for a probationary period.

== Continuation and unit training ==
Once a NGA has completed probation the candidate may be selected to undergo further amphibious training beyond that of AACC. During amphibious training, NGAs are trained in over-water parachute infiltration. Training is also conducted in Small/Fast Boat Coxswains; Small/Fast Boat operations and long-range surface navigation. Much of the training is conducted at night with this being the preferred time for covert infiltration and exfiltration. One team member (the team medic) is also cross trained as a combat medical technician with additional medical training in BATLS (Battlefield Advanced Trauma Life Support) and BARTs (Battlefield Advanced Resuscitation).

The unit conducts training in various exercises and climates including mountain and arctic, jungle, desert and temperate. It regularly deploys with Royal Marines units to Norway for annual cold weather warfare training and to Belize for jungle warfare training. Given the similar skillsets there is a level of training with the USMC's Air Naval Gunfire Liaison Company (ANGLICO) and Netherlands Marine Corps Marine Joint Effects Observer Groups to standardise procedures to assure interoperability.

== Equipment ==
The battery uses the vehicles and standard equipment of the UK Commando Force, supplemented with specialist observation capabilities; night vision, voice and data communications and target indication such as Laser Target Designators and GPS location.

Personal weapons are the L85A2, with the L7 General Purpose Machine Gun (GPMGs) and Minimi as support fire weapons.

As of July 2020, the battery began transitioning to the Colt Canada C8 rifles, similar to that of the UKSF and the Royal Marines adapting the Future Commando Force perception.

== See also ==
- British Army
- Royal Navy
- Battle of Meiktila
- 4/73 (Sphinx) Special Observation Post Battery RA
