= Battle of Wireless Ridge =

1982 Falklands War

- Part of Falklands War
Date	13 – 14 June 1982
Location	Wireless Ridge, Falkland Islands
Result	British victory

Belligerents
United Kingdom	Argentina

Commanders and leaders
(United Kingdom) Lt. Col. David Chaundler	(Argentina) Lt. Col. Omar Giménez

Units involved
3 Commando Brigade: 2nd Battalion Parachute Regiment (2 Para); 29th Commando Regiment; Blues and Royals; (United Kingdom) Royal Navy	7th Infantry Regiment; 10th Cavalry Squadron

Strength
600; 2 Scorpion light tanks 2 Scimitar light tanks 12 light guns 1 frigate	500

Casualties and losses
3 killed 11 wounded	25 killed 125 wounded 37 captured

The Battle of Wireless Ridge was an engagement of the Falklands War which took place on the night from 13 to 14 June 1982, between British and Argentine forces during the advance towards the Argentine-occupied capital of the Falkland Islands, Port Stanley.

Wireless Ridge was one of seven strategic hills within five miles of Stanley at 51°40′14″S 57°55′55″W that had to be taken in order for the Island's capital to be approached. The attack was successful, and the entire Argentine force on the Islands surrendered later that day.

The British force consisted of 2nd Battalion, The Parachute Regiment (2 Para), a troop of the Blues & Royals, with two FV101 Scorpion and two FV107 Scimitar light tanks, as well as artillery support from two batteries of 29 Commando Regiment Royal Artillery and naval gunfire support provided by HMS Ambuscade's 4.5-in gun.

The Argentine force consisted of the 7th Infantry Regiment as well as detachments from other units. The first Argentine unit to arrive in the sector was the 10th Brigade Headquarters Company commanded by Major José Rodolfo Banetta that took up residence inside the Moody Brook Barracks.The British destroyer HMS Glasgow targeted the Moody Brook area on 10 May, firing 222 shells at army bivouacs, anti-aircraft guns and the former Royal Marine Barracks.The new Argentine occupants had to finally evacuate the area on 11 June when British Harriers struck the building, killing three Argentine soldiers (Privates Mario Gustavo Rodríguez, Carlos Gustavo Mosto and Ignacio María Indino) and wounding their company commander.

At first, the 7th Regiment on Wireless Ridge was relatively comfortable, shooting sheep and roasting them on old bed frames the soldiers had found nearby. The soldiers of the supporting 10th Armoured Cavalry Reconnaissance Squadron, according to Private Sergio Díaz, also had a fairly comfortable time at first, enjoying a huge barbecue and cans of beers while commemorating Argentine Army Cavalry Day on 23 April. Private Guillermo Vélez from the 7th Regiment's Headquarters & Support Company maintains that he personally shot and killed 50 sheep during his time on Wireless Ridge.

== Background ==
After the losses sustained during the Battle of Goose Green, and the death of Lieutenant Colonel H Jones, Lieutenant Colonel David Chaundler, then in England was appointed to command the 2nd Battalion, Parachute Regiment (2 Para). He departed Ascension Island aboard a Vickers VC10, arriving in-theatre after an eighteen-hour flight with two in-flight refuellings, and was subsequently transferred to the Falklands by a C-130 Hercules engaged in parachute supply drops. Upon reaching the islands, Chaundler entered the sea and was recovered by helicopter, before being taken to HMS Hermes for a briefing by Admiral Sandy Woodward and then to the headquarters of Major General Jeremy Moore.

Four days after Goose Green, Chaundler formally joined 2 Para. Following a comprehensive debrief of the battalion's officers concerning the Battle of Goose Green and its aftermath, he vowed that the battalion would never again conduct an assault without assured fire-support. The battalion was air-lifted From Fitzroy by Sea King helicopters to Bluff Cove Peak, where it remained in reserve while the initial line of defensive hills Two Sisters, Mount Longdon and Mount Harriet fell to British forces.

Subsequently, three further objectives were assigned for the advance on Port Stanley: Mount Tumbledown to the Scots Guards, Mount William to the Gurkhas, and Wireless Ridge to 2 Para, marking the penultimate phase of the 3 Commando Brigade's campaign. On the morning of 13 June, after the Scots Guards secured Mount Tumbledown, 2 Para manoeuvred around the rear of Mount Longdon to occupy their assembly positions for the attack on Wireless Ridge. Expecting the engagement to conclude swiftly, they carried only personal weapons and as much ammunition as possible, leaving surplus equipment at the reserve camp. While positioned on Bluff Cove Peak, the battalion's mortar and machine gun platoons were strafed by Argentine A-4 Skyhawk aircraft, delaying their forward movement but without incurring casualties.

== Initial assault ==
Final Actions, 13 to 14 June 1982

In the closing hours of 13 June, D Company (Coy) began the attack sequence, advancing upon 'Rough Diamond' hill north-west of Mount Longdon. It had been hit by an intense barrage from British guns, from land and sea.

In the softening-up bombardment, British artillery had fired 6,000 rounds with their 105 mm pieces, and as the British paratroopers began their push, they were further backed by naval fire and the 76 and 30 mm guns mounted on the light tanks. The approximately 80 casualties sustained by 2 Para two weeks earlier at the Battle of Goose Green (including the loss of their commanding officer), had induced them not to take any unnecessary chances the second time around. The Argentine commanding officer, Lt.Col. Omar Giménez, says that three or four times he was nearly killed by a direct hit during the softening-up bombardment.

When D Coy reached the hill, they found that the Argentine compañía C of the 7th Infantry Regiment had withdrawn due to the heavy bombardment. As Major Philip Neame's D Coy started to consolidate their position, the Argentine 7th Regiment launched a series of heavy recoilless rifle, rocket and mortar attacks on Mount Longdon, causing casualties to the 3rd Battalion, The Parachute Regiment (3 Para).

With this massive fire support, A and B Coys were convinced the enemy on the 'Apple Pie' feature had been defeated, and began to advance confidently, but they met fierce resistance when they left their trenches. They came under heavy machine-gun fire; massive retaliation was initiated by the British machine-gunners and the guns of the Blues and Royals light tanks.

One Mount Longdon survivor from 3 Para recalled the British attack which was initially repulsed by the Argentines:

They tried going over the top first, but the incoming fire was too heavy so they went back behind the peat and waited for more artillery to soften them up.

The Argentine defenders there eventually withdrew in the face of such withering fire, and A and B Coys took their objective. By this stage of the battle, there were not many experienced Argentine officers left; the Forward Artillery Observation Officer (Major Guillermo Nani), the Operations Officer (Captain Carlos Ferreyra) and the compañía A and C commanders (Captains Jorge Calvo and Hugo García) and at least three senior platoon commanders (First Lieutenants Antonio Estrada, Jorge Guidobono and Ramon Galíndez-Matienzo) were wounded. C Coy then moved down from their northern start line to advance to a position east of Wireless Ridge where they found a platoon position was unoccupied.

By about 4.30am, Lieutenant-Colonel Gimenez knew that the 7th Infantry Regiment had been decisively defeated; Communications are lost, my whole regiment is finished, but other attached units continued to fight.

== SAS diversionary raid ==
A diversionary amphibious operation was mounted by elements of the Special Air Service (SAS) along with the Special Boat Service (SBS) on the night of 13–14 June to draw Argentine attention away from the assault on Wireless Ridge. Its objective was to attack the oil storage facilities situated on Cortley Ridge immediately north of Port Stanley harbour, in order to confuse Argentine defenders and prevent them reinforcing Wireless Ridge. Four Rigid Raider craft embarked around 30 SAS soldiers from D Squadron alongside six SBS commandos and set off across Port Stanley harbour under cover of darkness.

As the insertion force reached their target, they were illuminated by a searchlight from the Argentine hospital ship ARA Almirante Irízar, which had been positioned to recover Argentine special forces. The raiders came under heavy fire from 155 mm artillery and 35mm anti-aircraft guns from the northern side of the harbour and three were wounded during the withdrawal, and all four boats were damaged beyond repair. Though unable to destroy the oil installations, the raid successfully convinced Argentine commanders that a significant amphibious landing was imminent, diverting reserves away from Wireless Ridge.

== Final assault ==
Led by Captain Rodrigo Alejandro Soloaga, two platoons (under Lieutenant Luis Bertolini and Second Lieutenant Diego Bianchi-Harrington) from the Argentine 10th Armoured Cavalry Reconnaissance Squadron (which normally operated the Panhard AML) were ordered to counterattack and arriving on foot as reinforcements they took over the abandoned positions of the 7th Regiment Reconnaissance Platoon (under Lieutenant Francisco Ramón Galindez-Matienzo) in the western rocks of Wireless Ridge.

Maj. Philip Neame's D Coy (2 Para) then began the final assault from the western end of Wireless Ridge, under the cover of fire from HMS Ambuscade's 4.5 inch gun, four light tanks, twelve 105 mm artillery pieces, several mortars and anti-tank rockets. As the Argentine 7th Infantry absorbed the attack, Soloaga's squadron with around 100 men (including 30 hand-picked conscripts and NCOs having received Commando training the year before) were able to engage the British forces on "Apple Pie", including the tanks, a Milan platoon and a machine gun platoon. Over the course of two hours the 10th Squadron suffered six dead and 50 wounded. The small British armoured force had two light tanks neutralized avoiding Argentine fire when they fell into deep craters and had to be hauled out the next morning and suffered one serious head injury that had to driven to back to the 2 PARA aid post where he could receive proper treatment and where a replacement driver in the form of an officer took over his tank.

D Coy took the first half of their objective after a hard fight with a platoon of Argentine paratroopers under 2nd Lt Gustavo Alberto Aimar of the 2nd Airborne Infantry Regiment. While Neame's company was able to overrun the Argentine paratroopers, wounding Aimar and several of his men, the British suffered two killed (Privates David Parr and Francis Slough) in the process. Parr was actually killed by a British artillery round falling short. Neame's men then came under fierce attack from Maj. Guillermo Berazay's Compañía A, 3rd Regiment which had tried to move forward to Mt Longdon during the fighting two nights earlier but had only reached Moody Brook valley. With Lt José Luis Dobroevic's 81mm Mortar Platoon providing fire support, the company, in the form of the platoons of Subteniente (Sub-Lieutenant) Carlos Javier Aristegui and 1st Lt Víctor Rodriguez-Pérez advanced to contact. Private Patricio Pérez from Aristegui's platoon, recalled the unnerving experience of 66 mm rockets coming straight at them like undulating fireballs. He believed he shot a British paratrooper, possibly 12 Platoon's commander, and became enraged when he heard that his friend, Horacio Benítez from his platoon, had been shot.

According to Private Horacio Benítez from Aristegui's platoon:

The first of them to be hit was Private Eduardo Rinaldi, hit in the knee. Then Lieutenant Carlos Aristegui was hit in the neck, the bullet hitting his rosary beads. While that was happening, we moved up. There was a machine-gun position which I got behind; I was only a few metres away from them but I was able to climb up under the fire because of the slope of the ground. Sergeant Juan Vallejos told me to open fire with my FAP [Fusil Automático Pesado, or heavy automatic rifle]. I fired a magazine of twenty rounds; when I was replacing the magazine, it seemed to me that the British were laughing. I opened fire again. Then the British rushed at us. I fired another magazine and then got into some cover. They started throwing grenades at us. Next to me was another boy called Jorge Aumassanne. A grenade fell near him, and the force of the explosion blew him up into the air. He was badly hurt; he had six lumps of metal in his back. He walked across to me ― he didn't know what he was doing ― and told me he was going back. He gave his rifle to one man, his ammunition to another and off he went. Then another grenade came, a phosphorus one, and his clothes were on fire. We told him to get away because he was like a torch. He started to roll over the ground and tear his clothes off. I don't know how he saved himself. We did crazy things ― we were so desperate. One of our men, Private Ricardo Barrios, was also in the rocks not far from the British and was firing anti-tank grenades at them with his rifle. Perhaps the British thought there were many more of us but we were only a few. On our side, we thought it was only a patrol in front of us. but it was the whole of that Parachute Battalion, and we didn't know it. We had no communications with our headquarters. We were isolated. I was trying to get some ammunition from a dead man. I got a handful but, when I had filled my magazine and loading my weapon, I looked up and the British were right in front of me; one was pointing his rifle at me and he opened fire. The bullet hit the side of my helmet, entered and ripped my ear and lodged at the back of my head. That finished me off.

Some 20 soldiers in Rodriguez-Pérez's 1st Rifle Platoon and another 20 soldiers in Aristegui's 3rd Rifle Platoon, after initially going to ground, were rallied first by 1st Lt Rodriguez-Pérez at the head in the first wave and then Sergeant Ugo Rene Domínguez in charge of the second wave. Both formations delivered a frontal assault and in fact closed in with the British 12 Platoon, under the command of Lt Jonathan Page (following the death of Lt Barry at Goose Green). The fight surged back and forth. Lt Page managed to hold the line, but only just with Major Neame's company practically having run out of ammunition seizing and defending their last objective.

Commenting later on the action, retired Major-General John Frost (who in 1944 as a lieutenant-colonel had commanded 2 Para during the Battle of Arnhem) describes the attack on 12 Platoon: "For two very long hours the company remained under pressure. Small-arms fire mingled with all types of HE [high explosive rifle-grenades] fell in and around 12 Platoon's position as the men crouched in the abandoned enemy sangars [a type of fortification] and in shell holes." According to Neame: "Then from the east we got this counterattack. Jon Page, whose platoon I had left up that end did a really bloody good job. He managed to get hold of our artillery by flicking his radio onto their net, as we were still without our FOO. That broke up their attack." Private Graham Carter from D Coy confirms that some 20 men under Platoon Sergeant Ugo Domínguez from Aristegui's platoon in the second enemy formation had managed to sneak into the rocks through which 12 Platoon had come earlier: "We were out in the open on limb, and it looked like 10 and 11 Platoons were shooting at us. We asked the OC [Neame] to come over and check our position. He bimbled across seeming oblivious to tracer all around him, then wandered back. We thought, 'silly bugger'. Then our platoon commander [Lt Jonathan Page] stood up, shouted to everyone to keep down and was knocked over himself, hit in the leg. He was screaming and shouting, but when the medic stripped him off there was no wound, just massive bruising where the round had hit his ammunition pouch."

Neame's officers and NCOs rallied the men to capture the final part of their objective and in the face of heavy fire, the Argentines having run out of ammunition, broke and retreated, covered by supporting machine gun fire, directed by Lt Horacio Alejandro Mones-Ruiz, the commander of the 2nd Rifle Platoon from Berazay's compañía. Privates Esteban Tríes and José Cerezuela of Rodriguez-Pérez's platoon, volunteered to stay behind and rescue their wounded platoon sergeant, Manuel Villegas, laboriously carrying him to Port Stanley. With both Argentine rifle platoons having suffered 4 killed and 23 wounded in 2 hours of night combat, the force that delivered the counterattack under Rodriguez-Pérez and Dominguez, had suffered nearly 50% casualties.

Private Michael Savage and other survivors from Compañía C were the first 7th Regiment troops to reach the relative safety of Port Stanley, only to be greeted with shock and disdain, he recalls, by immaculately dressed staff officers: "They had been sleeping in houses, in warm beds. They had shiny shoes, pristine ironed uniforms and waxed moustaches. They even had heating in their cars. I was so furious with them."

The battle was not yet over. Lt-Col. Eugenio Dalton, an Argentine 10th Brigade staff officer, during the pre-dawn darkness of 14 June, was seen driving around in a jeep, marshalling tired, panicky and dazed soldiers from various units into a company and leading them into Stanley's western sector, under heavy fire. Some 200 survivors from Wireless Ridge had been rallied by Dalton to form, under heavy gunfire, a last-ditch defensive line in front of the now silenced guns of the 4th Airborne Artillery Group near the racecourse. Near the church in Stanley, intent on helping Berazay, Maj. Carrizo-Salvadores, Second-in-command of the 7th Regiment, helped by the chaplain Father José Fernández, mustered about 50 Wireless Ridge survivors and led them on a bayonet charge, with the soldiers chanting their famous 'Malvinas March', but were stopped by heavy artillery and machine-gun fire. Major Neame would describe the Argentine attack as "quite a sporting effort, but one without a sporting chance".The Paras were for a moment indeed alarmed as their ammunition was almost exhausted, so they hastily fixed bayonets and prepared hand-grenades for close-quarter combat. Neame later gave more details: "Then as daylight began we got another counter-attack, this time from the Moody Brook side onto Sean Webster's platoon. I thought 'bloody hell, what's going on around here?' I wondered what we had got into and thought that this was most unlike the Argentinians. For a while they were quite persistent."

2 Para had suffered three dead and 11 wounded. Its mortar platoon also reported four mortarmen with broken ankles after having fired supercharge rounds for extra range, in order to repel the Argentine counterattack force that had attacked from Moody Brook. The Argentines suffered approximately 25 dead and about 125 wounded, about 50 were taken prisoner. In the final stages of the battle, Brigadier-General Jofre had been offered the use of Skyhawks to bomb Wireless Ridge with napalm but declined in the belief that the British response would be commensurate.

== Aftermath and lessons learned ==
Following the battle, 2 PARA spearheaded the advance into Stanley, entering the town shortly before the formal Argentine surrender came into effect. Their role in reasserting British control over the territory was symbolically significant, given the early losses suffered by the unit and the high-profile death of their commanding officer, Lieutenant-Colonel Herbert Jones VC. 2 PARA's involvement in the Falklands War, proved decisive in securing British victory during Operation Corporate. The Battalions combat performance, despite difficult terrain, logistical constraints and enemy resistance, had a profound impact on British military doctrine and internal reforms in the following years and cemented an almost superhuman status in the British public perception of the Paras.

The successful advance through Argentine lines, in concert with attacks on Mount Tumbledown, Mount Longdon, and Two Sisters by other British units, exposed the fragility of Argentine defensive cohesion under sustained combined-arms pressure. British forces continued to apply firepower on withdrawing troops towards Port Stanley, a grim scene witnessed by officers who expressed dismay at the human toll of modern warfare. The use of concentrated artillery fire by British units, in particular 29 Commando Regiment Royal Artillery, was instrumental in breaking Argentine resolve prior to infantry engagement, a departure from earlier battles such as Goose Green where artillery support had been more limited. Some analysts later concluded that even a seasoned battalion would have struggled to hold such positions under the intensity of bombardment applied.

=== Impact and military reform ===
The war provided the British Army, and 2 PARA in particular, with extensive combat experience not seen since the Malayan Emergency and Borneo Confrontation. Post-conflict analyses by the Ministry of Defence led to a series of doctrinal revisions. Key among these was a renewed emphasis on:

Joint-service integration Operations in the South Atlantic highlighted the necessity of inter-service cooperation, particularly the coordination between air, land, and naval assets.

Improved command decentralisation The deaths of high-ranking officers, underscored the need for flexible command structures capable of rapid succession and decision-making.

Artillery and fire support The demonstrable effect of the pre-assault bombardment at Wireless Ridge led to the prioritisation of close support assets for light infantry. The challenges of logistics, terrain, weather, and communications also prompted re-investment in expeditionary warfare capabilities, including better cold-weather gear, portable communications, and rapid-response logistics frameworks.

=== Social and psychological effects ===
The psychological toll on 2 PARA personnel was considerable. Extended periods of combat, harsh conditions, and the proximity of loss led to long-term mental health repercussions among veterans, which at the time were under-reported and poorly supported by military infrastructure. This led to increased public awareness of PTSD and influenced future care provisions for veterans.

=== Commemoration and reconciliation ===
In an act of post-war reconciliation, in 2022, two retired officers from both sides, Lieutenant-Colonels Víctor Hugo Rodríguez-Perez formerly of the 3rd Mechanized Infantry Regiment and Philip Neame formerly of 2 PARA, met in London to present their respective memoirs. The meeting symbolised a broader effort at mutual recognition of professional soldiering and the shared hardships endured by both nations' combatants.

== Awards and citations ==
=== Argentine forces ===
- La Nación Argentina al Valor en Combate
  - Major Guillermo Rubén Berazay

=== British forces ===
All citations include actions at Goose Green

- The Distinguished Conduct Medal was awarded to:
  - Sergeant John Meredith
- The Military Cross Was awarded to:
  - Lieutenant Colin Connor: Recce Platoon
  - Major John Crosland: OC B Company
  - Major Charles Farrar-Hockley: OC A Company
- The Military Medal was awarded to:
  - Sergeant Ted Barrett
- Mentioned in Despatches:
  - Major Philip Neame, Private Emmanuel O'Rourke, Private Richard Morrell

== See also ==
Cortley Ridge raid – 1982 British raid of the Falklands War
