= RM Poole =

Royal Marines base in Dorset, England

Royal Marines Base Poole
- Near Hamworthy in England
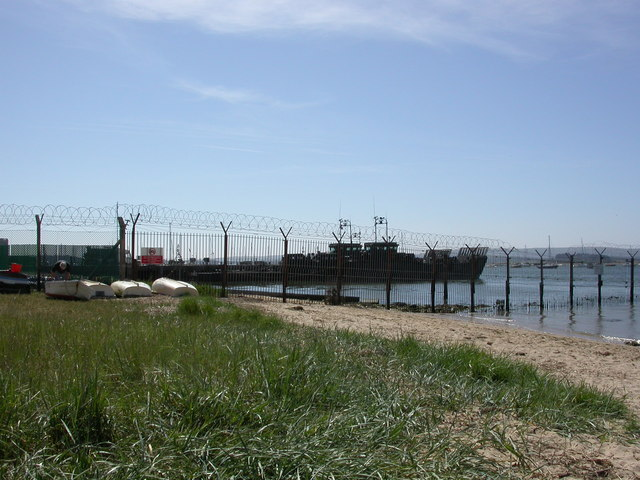
- Landing craft moored alongside pontoons at RM Poole

Site information
- Type: Royal Marines Base
- Owner: Ministry of Defence
- Operator: Royal Navy
- Controlled by: Royal Marines
- Condition: Operational

Location
- Shown within Dorset RM Poole (the United Kingdom)
- Coordinates: 50°43′13″N 002°01′18″W

Site history
- Built: 1942
- Built for: Royal Air Force
- In use: 1942-present

Garrison information
- Occupants: Royal Marines

Royal Marines Base Poole (RM Poole) is a British naval base located in Napier Road in Hamworthy, a suburb of Poole, Dorset, England on the Poole Harbour and is the centre for Royal Marines Commandos activities.

== History ==
The base was built in 1942 with the creation of RAF Hamworthy. In 1944, control of the site was handed over to the Royal Navy for use as a naval establishment. The site was known as HMS Turtle and was used for training personnel for the D-Day landings. In May 1944, the site was closed but a small number of personnel were retained for basic maintenance of the base. The site was re-opened and taken over by the Royal Marines in 1954 and became known as the Amphibious School, Royal Marines. In 1956, it was expanded and was renamed the Joint Service Amphibious Warfare Centre (JSAWC). In the early 1960s, it was renamed the Amphibious Training Unit Royal Marines (ATURM). The Technical Training Wing was moved from Eastney Barracks to Poole in 1973 and the base became known as the Royal Marines Poole. 1 Assault Group Royal Marines, which are responsible for landing craft training, was formed at the site in October 2001 but moved to RM Tamar in August 2013.

The base has its own internal training area, which is located at the northern edge of the unit. It has been described as being a pre-deployment training area with a Forward Operating Base (FOB) scenario, a street façade and an Improvised Explosive Device (IED) lane.

== Operations ==
The Royal Marines have four Squadrons based at RM Poole, as well as use of 148 (Meiktila) Battery Royal Artillery.

== Gallery ==
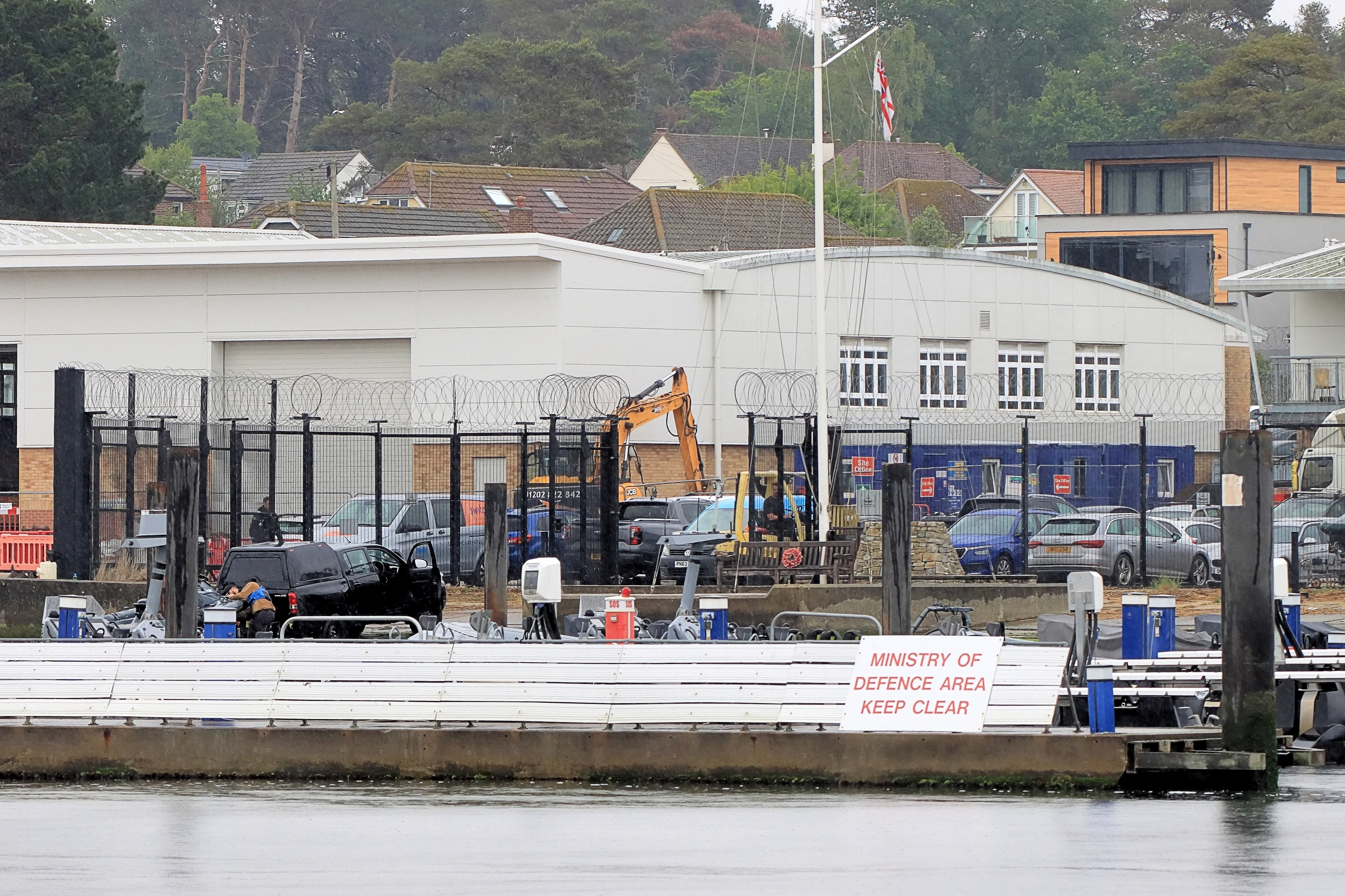

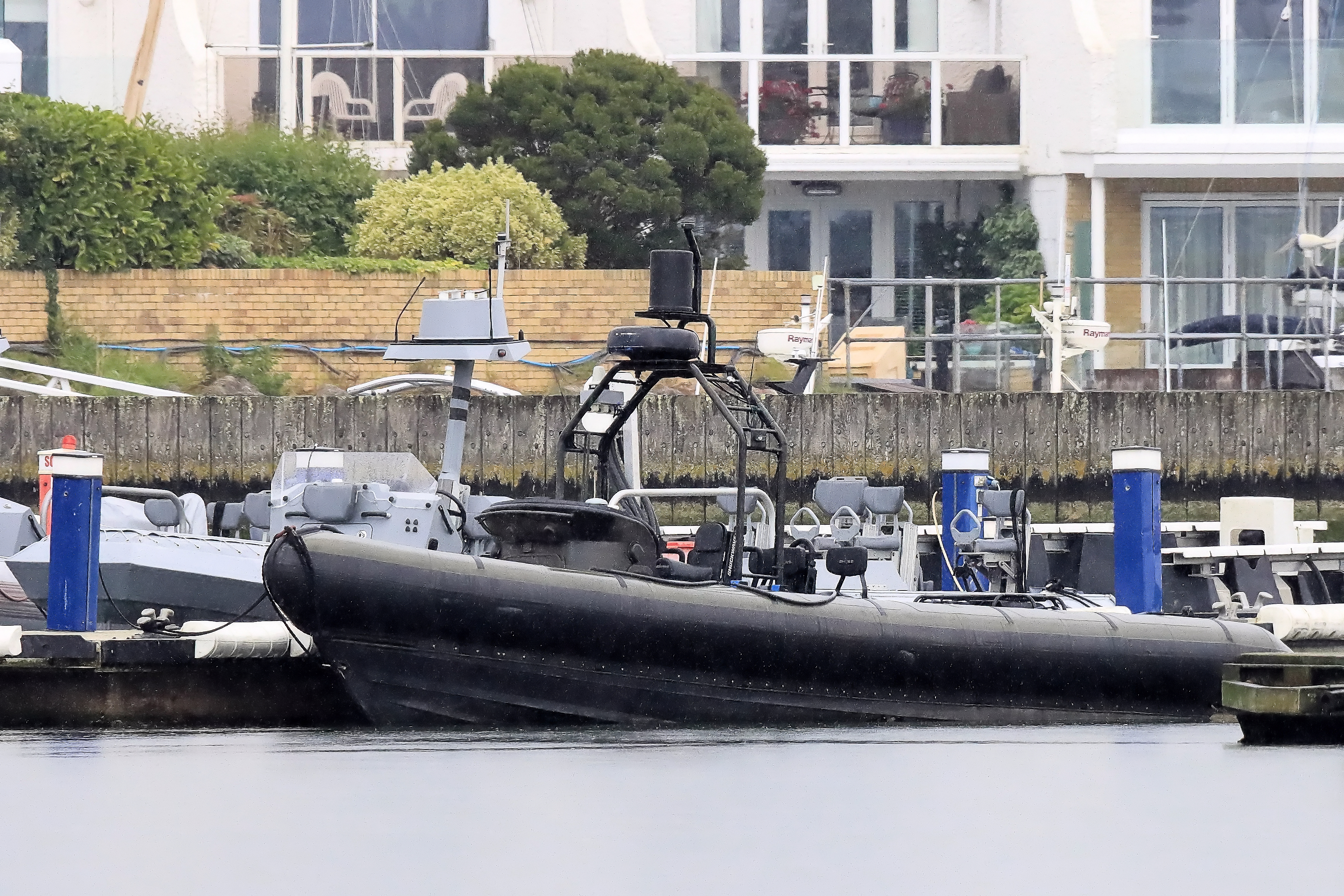

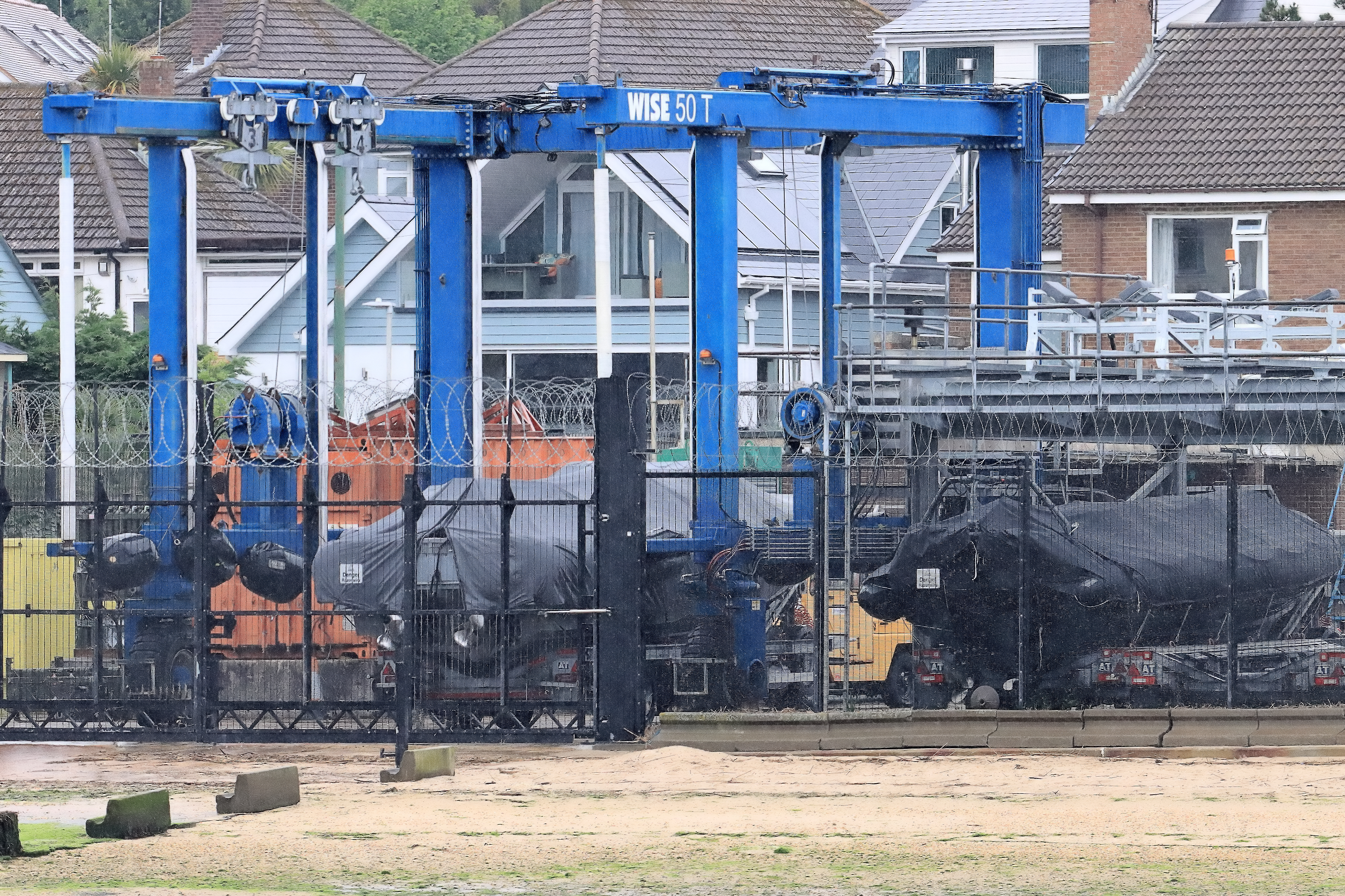
