= 1st Artillery Brigade (United Kingdom) =

1st Artillery Brigade 1st Artillery Division
- Formation badge of the brigade
- Active: 1961–1977; 1977–1993; 1997–2022
- Country: United Kingdom
- Branch: British Army
- Type: Combat Support Formation
- Size: Brigade
- Part of: 3rd (United Kingdom) Division
- Brigade HQ: Jellalabad Barracks, Tidworth Camp
- Website: HQ 1st Artillery Brigade

The 1st Artillery Brigade was a support formation of the British Army from 1961-77 and from 1997. Part of the 3rd (United Kingdom) Division, it oversaw all army close support artillery and deep fires units. Under the Future Soldier programme, the brigade merged with 1st Armoured Infantry Brigade to form 1st Deep Reconnaissance Strike Brigade Combat Team.

== Cold War ==
In a reorganisation of the British Army of the Rhine following the 1957 Defence White Paper, the former 1st Army Group Royal Artillery was reduced to a 1-star command, and redesignated as the 1st Artillery Brigade (Field). The new brigade was headquartered at Tofrek Barracks in Hildesheim. On 4 October 1961, 1 AGRA was officially redesignated, but later dropped the '(Field)' title in 1967 following the 1966 Defence White Paper, becoming the 1st Artillery Brigade. The brigade was originally responsible for commanding the two MGM-5 Corporal tactical ballistic missile regiments and a new support regiment. (From 1959, there were two regiments with the missile). It gradually evolved from a command unit solely for the Corporal missile regiments to one for all GHQ field artillery within I (British) Corps. The brigade is shown as having controlled the two Corporal-equipped regiments.

In 1958 218 Signal Squadron, Royal Corps of Signals was part of the brigade.(Lord & Watson, p. 66) It appears to have disbanded in 1960 On 1 January 1967 257 Signal Squadron became 1st Artillery Brigade HQ and Signals Squadron, as reported by the National Archives from 1967-70. Lord & Watson, p. 80 refers to 218 Squadron still being active, but this seems likely to have been a confusion with 1 Artillery Brigade HQ and Signals Squadron.

The brigade's structure by 1967 was as follows:

- 1st Artillery Brigade
  - Brigade Headquarters, at Tofrek (East) Barracks, Hildesheim
  - 1st Artillery Brigade HQ and Signals Squadron, Royal Corps of Signals, at Hildesheim
  - 10th Royal Hussars (Prince of Wales' Own), at York Barracks, Münster [nuclear armoured escort role]
  - 94th Locating Regiment, Royal Artillery, at Taunton Barracks, Celle
  - 20th Heavy Regiment, Royal Artillery, at Saint Barbara Barracks, Fallingbostel (M107 175 mm self-propelled guns)
  - 32nd Heavy Regiment, Royal Artillery, at Tofrek Barracks, Hildesheim (M107 175 mm self-propelled guns)
  - 39th Missile Regiment, Royal Artillery, at Dempsey Barracks, Sennelager (75 & 171 Heavy Batteries with 8-inch howitzers and 19 & 36 Missile Batteries with Honest Johns)
  - 50th Missile Regiment, Royal Artillery, at Northumberland Barracks, Minden (33 & 78 Heavy Batteries with 8-inch howitzers and 15 & 21 Missile Batteries with Honest Johns)
  - 8th Transport Regiment (Weapons Support Group), Royal Corps of Transport, at Nelson Barracks, Münster [tasked with transport and safe custody of nuclear warheads]

Following the 1975 Defence White Paper, the "Mason Review," brigades were done away with and replaced by task forces. The 1st Artillery Brigade was also disbanded on 1 September 1977, subsequently merged with the 7th Anti-Aircraft Brigade and became the 1st Artillery Division. In the process, 1 Artillery Brigade HQ and Signals Squadron was disbanded. The new division was organised as follows:

- 1st Artillery Division
  - Division Headquarters, in Dortmund
  - Royal Scots (Royal Regiment), at Oxford Barracks, Münster [nuclear escort battalion]
  - 94th Locating Regiment, Royal Artillery, at Taunton Barracks, Celle
  - 12th Air Defence Regiment, Royal Artillery, at Moore Barracks, Dortmund (with Rapier surface to air missiles)
  - 22nd Air Defence Regiment, Royal Artillery, at Rapier Barracks, Kirton in Lindsey (with Rapier surface to air missiles)
  - 5th Heavy Regiment, Royal Artillery, at Tofrek Barracks, Hildesheim (with M107 175 mm self-propelled guns)
  - 50th Missile Regiment, Royal Artillery, at Northumberland Barracks, Minden (with MGM-52 Lance ballistic missiles)
  - 8th Transport Regiment (Weapons Support Group), Royal Corps of Transport, at Nelson Barracks, Münster [tasked with transport and safe custody of nuclear warheads]

Following the 1981 Defence White Paper, the brigades were reformed, and the division was subsequently redesignated as [the] Artillery Division. In 1984, it was further redesignated as Artillery, I (British) Corps, and on 1 November 1985 became the 1st Artillery Brigade once again.

In January 1985, 12th Air Defence Regiment RA was moving from Rapier Barracks, Kirton-in-Lindsey, in North East District to Napier Barracks in Dortmund. In a semi-swap, at the same time, 16 Air Defence Regiment returned home from Moore Barracks in Dortmund to Rapier Barracks in Kirton-in-Lindsey.

Isby and Kamps 1985 lists the brigade "up to the beginning of 1985" with headquarters at Ripon Barracks, Bielefeld; three heavy regiments (5, 32, and 39); 50 Missile Regiment; and 16 and 22 Air Defence Regiments, though 16 Regiment of course was in the process of moving back to the UK. Also present of course was 8 Artillery Support Regiment, but Isby and Kamps did not list RCT units.

- 1st Artillery Brigade (1985)
  - Brigade Headquarters, Ripon Barracks, Bielefeld
  - 12th Air Defence Regiment, Royal Artillery, at Napier Barracks, Dortmund (with Rapier surface to air missiles)
  - 5th Heavy Regiment, Royal Artillery, at West Riding Barracks, Dortmund (with M107 175 mm self-propelled guns)
  - 22nd Air Defence Regiment, Royal Artillery, at Napier Barracks, Dortmund (with Rapier surface to air missiles)
  - 32nd Heavy Regiment, Royal Artillery, Moore Barracks, Dortmund (with M107 175 mm self-propelled guns)
  - 39th Heavy Regiment, Royal Artillery, at Dempsey Barracks, Sennelager (with M110 203 mm self-propelled guns)
  - 50th Missile Regiment, Royal Artillery, at Northumberland Barracks, Minden (with MGM-52 Lance ballistic missiles)
  - 8th Transport Regiment (Weapons Support Group), Royal Corps of Transport, at Nelson Barracks, Münster [tasked with transport and safe custody of nuclear warheads]

Structure of the 1st Artillery Brigade in 1989:

- Headquarters 1st Artillery Brigade – Ripon Barracks, Bielefeld
  - General Support Group
    - 5th Regiment Royal Artillery – Heavy Artillery – Dortmund, supporting 4th Armoured Division
    - 32nd Regiment Royal Artillery – Heavy Artillery – Dortmund, supporting 1st Armoured Division
  - Corps Support Group
    - 39th Regiment Royal Artillery – Nuclear Artillery – Sennelager
    - 50th Missile Regiment Royal Artillery – MGM-52 Lance surface to surface missile – Menden
  - Air Defence Group
    - 12th Regiment Royal Artillery – Dortmund
    - 22nd Regiment Royal Artillery – Dortmund
  - Logistics Group
    - 8th (Artillery Support) Regiment, Royal Corps of Transport – Münster
    - 570th Artillery Group (US Army)
    - 583rd Ordnance Company (US Army)
  - Units which would be assigned to the brigade if mobilised:
    - Royal Artillery Alanbrooke Band – Woolwich (Medical evacuation company if mobilised)
    - Rear Link Detachment from 55 Signal Squadron, in Liverpool – assigned to HQ
    - 8th (V) Battalion, Queen's Fusiliers (City of London), in Clapham, London – Infantry Defence for 50 Missile Regiment
    - 27th Regiment Royal Artillery – FH70 155 mm towed howitzer – Topcliffe, supporting the 1st Armoured Division
    - 45th Regiment Royal Artillery – FH70 155 mm towed howitzer – Colchester, supporting 4th Armoured Division
    - 94th Locating Regiment Royal Artillery, at Roberts Barracks, Larkhill – batteries detached
    - The Honourable Artillery Company (TA), Finsbury, London – Stay-behind observation posts
    - 266 (Gloucestershire Volunteer Artillery) Battery, Royal Artillery (V), Clifton — Stay-behind observation posts
    - 16th Regiment Royal Artillery – Air Defence – Kirton in Lindsey
    - 102nd Regiment Royal Artillery (V) – Air Defence – Newtownards
    - 104th Regiment Royal Artillery (V) – Air Defence – Newport
    - 105th Regiment Royal Artillery (V) – Air Defence – Edinburgh
    - 153rd (Highland) Artillery Support Regiment, Royal Corps of Transport, HQ in Dunfermline – Reserve logistics support

== Post Cold War ==
Following the Dissolution of the Soviet Union, the Options for Change paper was published in 1992, which reduced to the army by more than a third. Under this reorganisation, the brigade was disbanded about 1993.

On 1 April 1997, the brigade was reformed as 1st Artillery Brigade. The new brigade was organised as follows by 2012:

- 1st Artillery Brigade
  - Headquarters, 1st Artillery Brigade, at Airfield Camp, Netheravon
  - 5th Regiment, Royal Artillery, at Marne Barracks, Catterick Garrison (Surveillance and Target Acquisition)
  - 32nd Regiment, Royal Artillery, at Purvis Lines, Roberts Barracks, Larkhill Garrison (Unmanned Aerial Vehicles with BAE Systems Phoenixes)
  - 39th Regiment, Royal Artillery, at Albemarle Barracks, Newcastle upon Tyne (12 x M270 Multiple Launch Rocket Systems)
    - 57 (Bhurtpore) Locating Battery (Surveillance and Target Acquisition)
  - 101st (Northumbrian) Regiment, Royal Artillery, HQ in Gateshead [administratively under 15th (North East) Brigade]
    - 204 (Tyneside Scottish) Battery, in Kingston Park (Surveillance and Target Acquisition and Command and Control Capability for Brigade HQ)
    - 203 (Elswick) Battery, in Blyth (6 x M270 Multiple Launch Rocket Systems)
    - 205 (3rd Durham Volunteer Artillery) Battery, in South Shields (6 x M270 Multiple Launch Rocket Systems)
  - Honourable Artillery Company, at Finsbury Barracks, City of London (Surveillance and Target Acquisition)
  - Brigade Support Troop

Under the Army 2020 programme announced in 2013, the brigade merged with 43rd (Wessex) Brigade to become 1st Artillery Brigade and Headquarters South West. The old artillery brigade became the operational portion of the formation, while 43 Brigade became the regional headquarters element. The brigade's operational role was expanded and by this point oversaw all artillery units administratively within the army. Operationally, it controlled all but the special regiments (7 Parachute Regt RHA, 29 Commando Regt, RA, the Surveillance/Drone regiments, and the Air Defence regiments). The brigade's role was described "...will deliver both close support artillery and precision fires, as well as leading Air-Land Integration". The brigade's new designation as 'Headquarters South West' indicating its shift to an administrative formation, now overseeing all of South West England and the Channel Islands.

- 1st Artillery Brigade and Headquarters South West
  - Headquarters, 1st Artillery Brigade, at Jellalabad Barracks, Tidworth Camp – HQ includes 2 x deputies, one for the operational (artillery) sector, and one for the regional sector
  - Headquarters South West, at Jellalabad Barracks, Tidworth Camp
  - 3rd Regiment, Royal Horse Artillery, at Alanbrooke Barracks, Topcliffe (with L118 light guns)
  - 4th Regiment, Royal Artillery, at Alanbrooke Barracks, Topcliffe (with L118 light guns)
  - 1st Regiment, Royal Horse Artillery, at Assaye Barracks, Tidworth Camp (with AS-90 SPGs and M270 MLRS)
  - 19th Regiment, Royal Artillery, at Bhurtpore Barracks, Tidworth Camp (with AS-90 SPGs and M270 MLRS)
  - 26th Regiment, Royal Artillery, at Mansergh Barracks, Gütersloh Garrison (with AS-90 SPGs and M270 MLRS)
  - 103rd (Lancashire Artillery Volunteers) Regiment, Royal Artillery (V), at Jubilee Barracks, Saint Helens (24 x L118 105 mm light gun)
  - 105th Regiment, Royal Artillery (V), at Redford Barracks, Edinburgh (24 x L118 105 mm light gun)
  - 101st (Northubrian) Regiment, Royal Artillery (V), in Gateshead (24 x M270 Multiple Launch Rocket Systems)

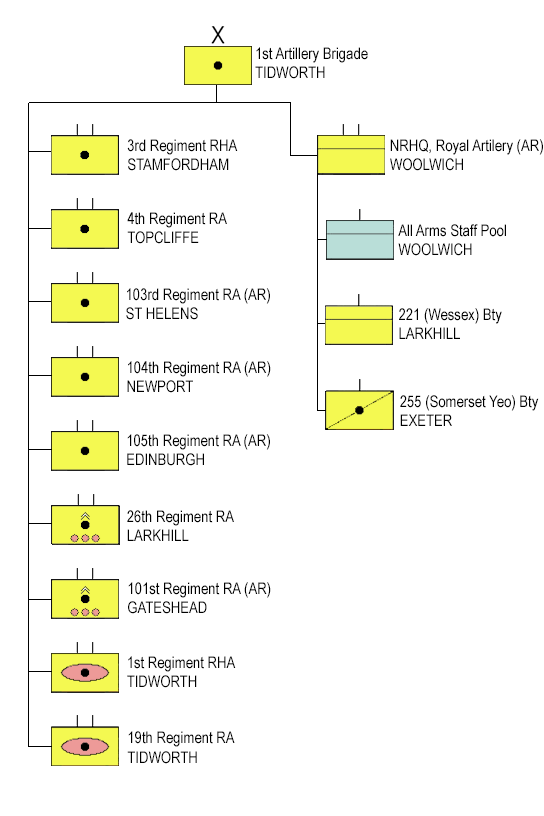
Updated structure of 1st Artillery Brigade as of June 2021.

In 2019, a reorganisation of the Field Army saw the 1st Artillery Brigade lose its regional affiliation, once again becoming simply 1st Artillery Brigade. In addition to the removal of the regional basis, the brigade was reorganised, and placed under command of the 3rd (United Kingdom) Division. The brigade's structure at February 2022 was as follows:

- 1st Artillery Brigade
  - Headquarters, 1st Artillery Brigade, at Jellalabad Barracks, Tidworth Camp
  - National Reserve Headquarters, Royal Artillery (AR), at Royal Artillery Barracks, Woolwich Station (overseeing the Watchkeeper pool and providing specialist batteries/troops)
  - 5th Regiment Royal Artillery, at Marne Barracks, Catterick Garrison
  - 3rd Regiment Royal Horse Artillery, at Albemarle Barracks, Stamfordham (Light Field Artillery, 12 x L118 105 mm light gun)
  - 4th Regiment Royal Artillery, at Alanbrooke Barracks, Topcliffe (Light Field Artillery, 12 x L118 105 mm light gun)
  - 1st Regiment Royal Horse Artillery, at Assaye Barracks, Tidworth Camp (Self-Propelled field artillery, 18 x AS-90 155 mm self-propelled howitzers) – supporting 20 Arm Inf Bde
  - 19th Regiment Royal Artillery, at Bhurtpore Barracks, Tidworth Camp (Self-Propelled field artillery, 18 x AS-90 155mm self-propelled howitzers) – supporting 12 Arm Inf Bde
  - 26th Regiment Royal Artillery, at Purvis Lines, Larkhill Garrison (Divisional Fires, 24 x M270 Multiple Launch Rocket Systems)
  - 103rd (Lancashire Artillery Volunteers) Regiment, Royal Artillery (AR), at Jubilee Barracks, St Helens (Light Field Artillery, 24 x L118 105 mm light gun) — paired with 1 Regiment RHA
  - 104th Regiment Royal Artillery (AR), at Raglan Barracks, Newport (Light Field Artillery, 24 x L118 105 mm light gun) — paired with 4 Regiment RA
  - 105th Regiment Royal Artillery (AR), at Redford Barracks, Edinburgh (Light Field Artillery, 24 x L118 105 mm light gun) — paired with 19 Regiment RA
  - 101st (Northumbrian) Regiment Royal Artillery (AR), at Napier Armoury, Gateshead (Divisional Fire, 24 x M270 Multiple Launch Rocket Systems) — paired with 26 Regiment RA

== Commanders ==
Commanders of the brigade included:

- October 1961–December 1962: Brigadier John E. Cordingley
- December 1962–December 1965: Brigadier Harry S. Langstaff
- December 1965–December 1967: Brigadier Ronald A. Norman-Walker
- December 1967–December 1970: Brigadier Leo Heathcote Plummer
- December 1970–February 1973: Brigadier Thomas Lovett Morony
- February 1973–February 1975: Brigadier D. K. Neville
- February 1975–September 1977: Brigadier John Aubrey Stephenson

(from 1977 to 1985 the post of commander was held by Commander Artillery, I (British) Corps)

- September 1977–April 1979: Major General Geoffrey Boyd Wilson
- April 1979–March 1982: Major General Edward Arthur Burgess
- March 1982–February 1985: Major General Guy Hansard Watkins
- February 1985–November 1985: Major General John Hartley Learmont
- November 1985–November 1988: Brigadier Michael F. L. Shellard
- November 1988–January 1991: Brigadier Alan Fleetwood Gordon
- January 1991–August 1992: Brigadier Mark G. Douglas-Withers
- August 1992–1993: Brigadier John Milne
- 2001–March 2003: Brigadier Nigel B. Philpott
- March 2003–March 2004: Brigadier Robert W. H. Purdy
- Between 2004 and 2014, the officer commanding the brigade held the rank of colonel
- June 2014–March 2016: Brigadier Jeremy Matthew James Bennett
- August 2016–2018: Brigadier John R. Mead
- 2018–August 2020: Brigadier Mark Pullan
- August 2020 – July 2020: Brigadier Charles Arthur Hewitt (Position abolished upon the Brigade's merge with 1st Armoured Infantry Brigade to form 1st Deep Reconnaissance Strike BCT)

== Footnotes ==
Citations
