= 8 Artillery Support Regiment RLC =

8 Artillery Support Regiment
- Active: 1964 - 2012
- Disbanded: 2012
- Country: United Kingdom
- Branch: British Army
- Role: Artillery Transport Support Regiment
- Size: Regiment
- Part of: Royal Logistic Corps
- Garrison/HQ: York Barracks, Münster
- Nickname: "The Scorpions"
- Engagements: Bosnia War; Kosovo War; Iraq War; War in Afghanistan

8 Regiment RLC was a regiment of the British Army's Royal Logistic Corps.

== History ==
The regiment was originally formed as 8 Transport Column (Advanced Weapons Support) Royal Army Service Corps in 1964. Throughout the Cold War the regiment was attached to the 1st Artillery Brigade as part of the British Army of the Rhine. Its squadrons each supported a specific heavy artillery regiment. After the dissolution of the British Army of the Rhine the regiment moved to support the 1st (UK) Armoured Division. Untder Army 2020 the regiment disbanded as part of the reduction of the British Army from Germany.

== Structure ==
Structure of the regiment in 1989:

8th Artillery Support Regiment, Royal Corps of Transport

- Regimental Headquarters and Headquarters Company
- 5 Transport Squadron (supporting 50th Missile Regiment, Royal Artillery)
- 12 Transport Squadron (supporting 5th Heavy Regiment, Royal Artillery)
- 13 Transport Squadron (supporting 32nd Heavy Regiment, Royal Artillery)
- 27 Transport Squadron (supporting 39th Heavy Regiment, Royal Artillery)
- 207 Transport Squadron (volunteer squadron)
- Royal Electrical and Mechanical Engineers Workshop
