= Carver matrix =

The Carver matrix can refer to:

- CARVER matrix - a military based target acquisition system
- Carver matrix seriation diagram named after Martin Carver which is designed to represent the time lapse in use of recognizable archaeological entities such as floors and pits.
