= 93 (Le Cateau) Battery Royal Artillery =

British Army artillery unit

93 (Le Cateau) Battery RA
- Active: 6 December 1803 (as Vivyan's Company). 1 April 1947 as 93 Field Battery RA and as 93 (Le Cateau) Battery from June 1948.
- Disbanded: 1 April 1984 - Suspended Animation 24 November 2011 - Reformed in 5RA
- Country: UK
- Branch: British Army
- Type: Royal Regiment of Artillery
- Role: Surveillance & Target Acquisition
- Size: Battery
- Motto: 93rdoffoot
- Anniversaries: 6 December - Battery Birthday (as Vivyan's Company) 1 April (93 Battery formation) 26 August - Battle of Le Cateau Anniversary
- Equipment: MAMBA, ASP & LCMR
- Engagements: Copenhagen (1806), Afghanistan (1899), South Africa (1903), Le Cateau (1914), North Africa (1939-40), Burma (1944-45), Malaya (1948), Cyprus (1958-59), Northern Ireland (1970, 1972, 1975 &1977) & Afghanistan (2012-13)
- Decorations: 3 x Victoria Crosses, 2 x Distinguished Service Orders (DSO) 2 x Distinguished Service Medals (DSM), 1 Legion d'Honneur & 1 Croix de Guerre.
- Battle honours: " Le Cateau" (awarded to the Battery, June 1948 for their actions in Malaya)

93 (Le Cateau) Battery Royal Artillery is an equipment Battery existing in 5th Regiment Royal Artillery "The Yorkshire Gunners" and is based at Marne Barracks, Catterick, North Yorkshire.The Battery currently operates in a Surveillance and Target Acquisition role.

== History ==
37 Field Battery merged with 47 Field Battery in 1938 to form 37/47 Field Battery RFA. They then spent the early stages of World War II in Sub-Saharan Africa, before travelling to South-East Asia as part of the 1944 Burma Campaign.

On 1 April 1947, 37/47 Field Battery RFA was renamed 93 Field Battery RA in Gunclub Barracks, Kowloon, Hong Kong as part of 25th Field Regiment RA.

24 November 2011, 93 (Le Cateau) Battery re-established as a Battery within 5th Regiment Royal Artillery (The Yorkshire Gunners), based in Marne Barracks, Catterick.

In September 2012 the Battery deployed to Afghanistan on Operation HERRICK 17 as the Theatre Surveillance and Target Acquisition Battery. The Battery were employed in a plethora of key locations within Helmand Province and provided vital ISTAR to the Brigade.

== See also ==
- List of Royal Artillery Batteries
