= Alanbrooke Barracks =

Barracks in Topcliffe, North Yorkshire, England

- Topcliffe, North Yorkshire, England
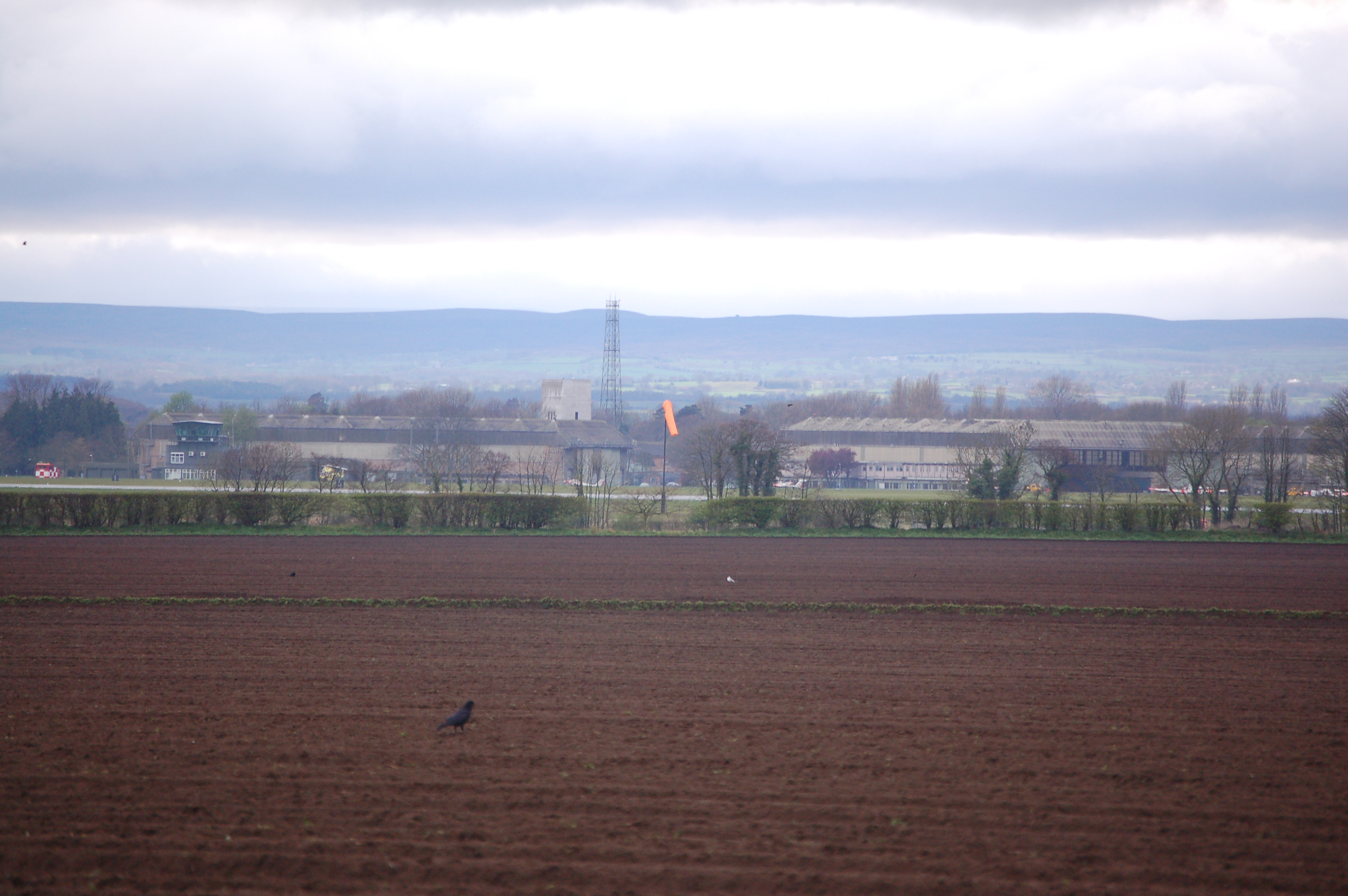
- Alanbrooke Barracks

Site information
- Type: Army barracks
- Owner: Ministry of Defence
- Operator: British Army
- Controlled by: Royal Artillery
- Condition: Operational

Location
- Location within North Yorkshire
- Coordinates: 54°12′12″N 01°24′06″W
- Area: 151 hectares (370 acres)

Site history
- Built: 1974
- In use: 1974 – present

Garrison information
- Garrison: 4th Regiment Royal Artillery

Alanbrooke Barracks is a military installation at Topcliffe in North Yorkshire, England.

== History ==
The barracks were established, on the site of the former RAF Topcliffe airbase, in 1974, as an ordnance field park. The barracks were named Alanbrooke Barracks after Field Marshal Viscount Alanbrooke, a former Royal Artillery officer, when 1st Regiment Royal Horse Artillery took over the site in 1977. The barracks continued as an artillery base with the arrival of 49 Regiment Royal Artillery in 1982, 27th Regiment Royal Artillery in 1986, 19th Regiment Royal Artillery in 1990, 40th Regiment Royal Artillery in 1998, and 4th Regiment Royal Artillery in 2008.

The barracks were also home to 15th Infantry Brigade from January 1982 to November 1992.

== Current units ==
- 4th Regiment, Royal Artillery

== Future ==
The barracks are set to close in 2032 under the Better Defence Estate plan.

== See also ==
- List of British Army installations
