= 207 (City of Glasgow) Battery Royal Artillery =

British Army reserve artillery battery

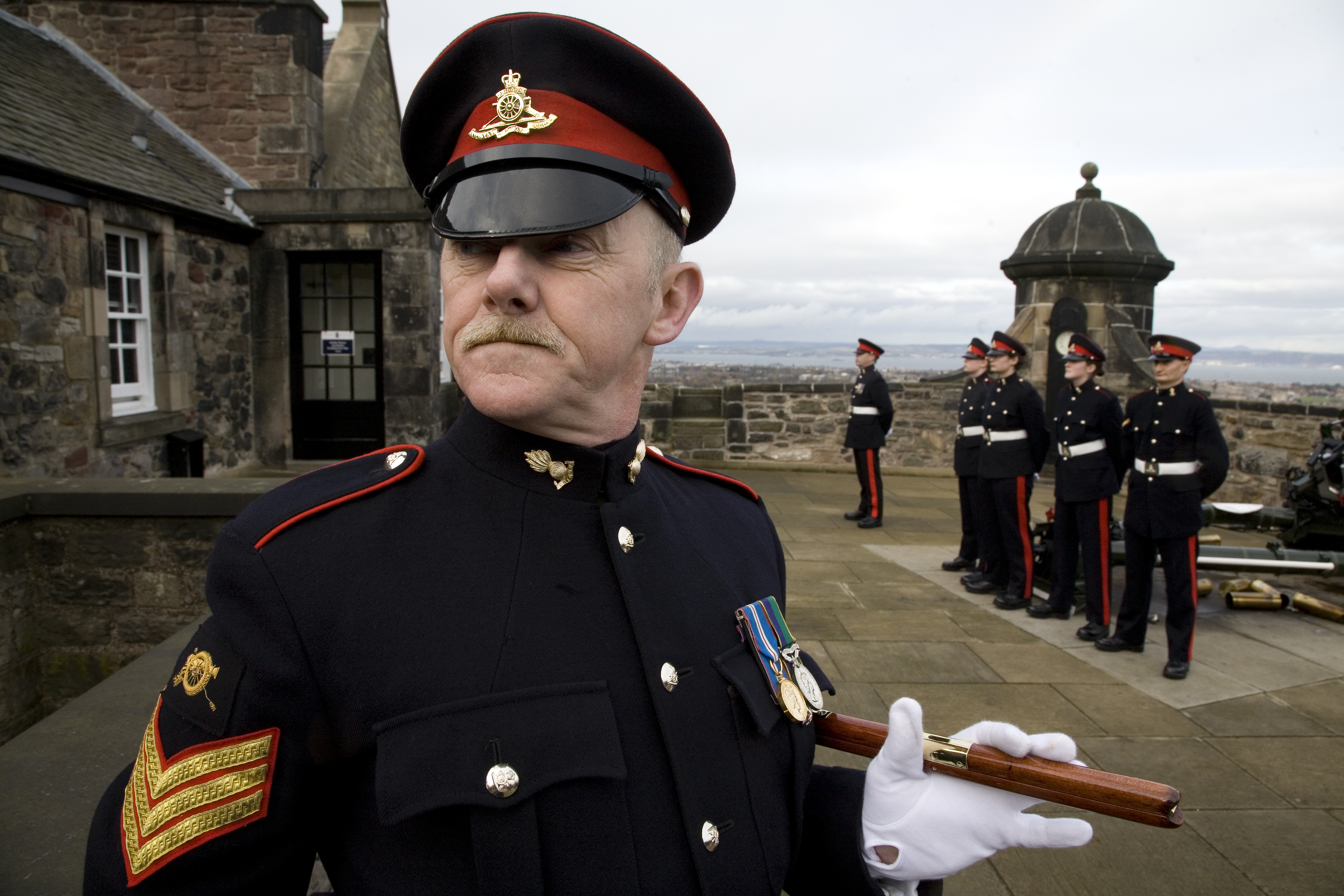
- Active: 1967-Present
- Country: United Kingdom
- Allegiance: United Kingdom
- Branch: British Army
- Role: Field Artillery
- Size: One Battery
- Part of: 105th Regiment Royal Artillery
- Garrison/HQ: Glasgow
- Nickname(s): Glasgow Gunners
- Motto(s): Ubique Quo Fas Et Gloria Ducunt
- Colors: The guns are regarded as the regimental colours
- March: British Grenadiers / Voice Of The Guns (Quick); The Royal Artillery Slow March colloquially known as The Duchess of Kent (Slow); The Keel Row (Trot); "Bonnie Dundee" (Canter)
- Equipment: L118 Light Gun.

207 (City of Glasgow) Battery, is an Army Reserve sub-unit, part of the 105th Regiment Royal Artillery. The battery is based in Partick, Glasgow. It is a Close Support Light Gun Battery.

== History ==
Formed in 1967 as 207 (Scottish) Light Air Defence Battery Royal Artillery (Volunteers), the battery was originally part of 102nd (Ulster and Scottish) Air Defence Regiment Royal Artillery but later joined 105th (Scottish) Air Defence Regiment Royal Artillery (Volunteers) on 1 April 1986.

Conferred the title "City of Glasgow" in 1987, the Battery has been re-roled to field guns, using the L118 light gun since 2006. In early 2015, D (Lothian) Troop, located in Edinburgh was upgraded to battery strength and formed 278 (Lowland) Battery Royal Artillery and D Troop was reformed in Glasgow where both Gun Troops (C and D Troops) are now co-located alongside Battery Headquarters.

The Battery carries the honour of firing regular Royal Salutes at Edinburgh Castle, alongside other stations such as Stirling Castle. In 2015 the Battery honoured the 100th anniversary of the City of Glasgow Battery's covering of the withdrawal from the Gallipoli campaign through firing a 17 Gun Salute on Glasgow Green. In 2017 the Battery celebrated its 50th birthday through firing a Feu de Joie Gun Salute at Dumbarton Castle.

== Gallery ==
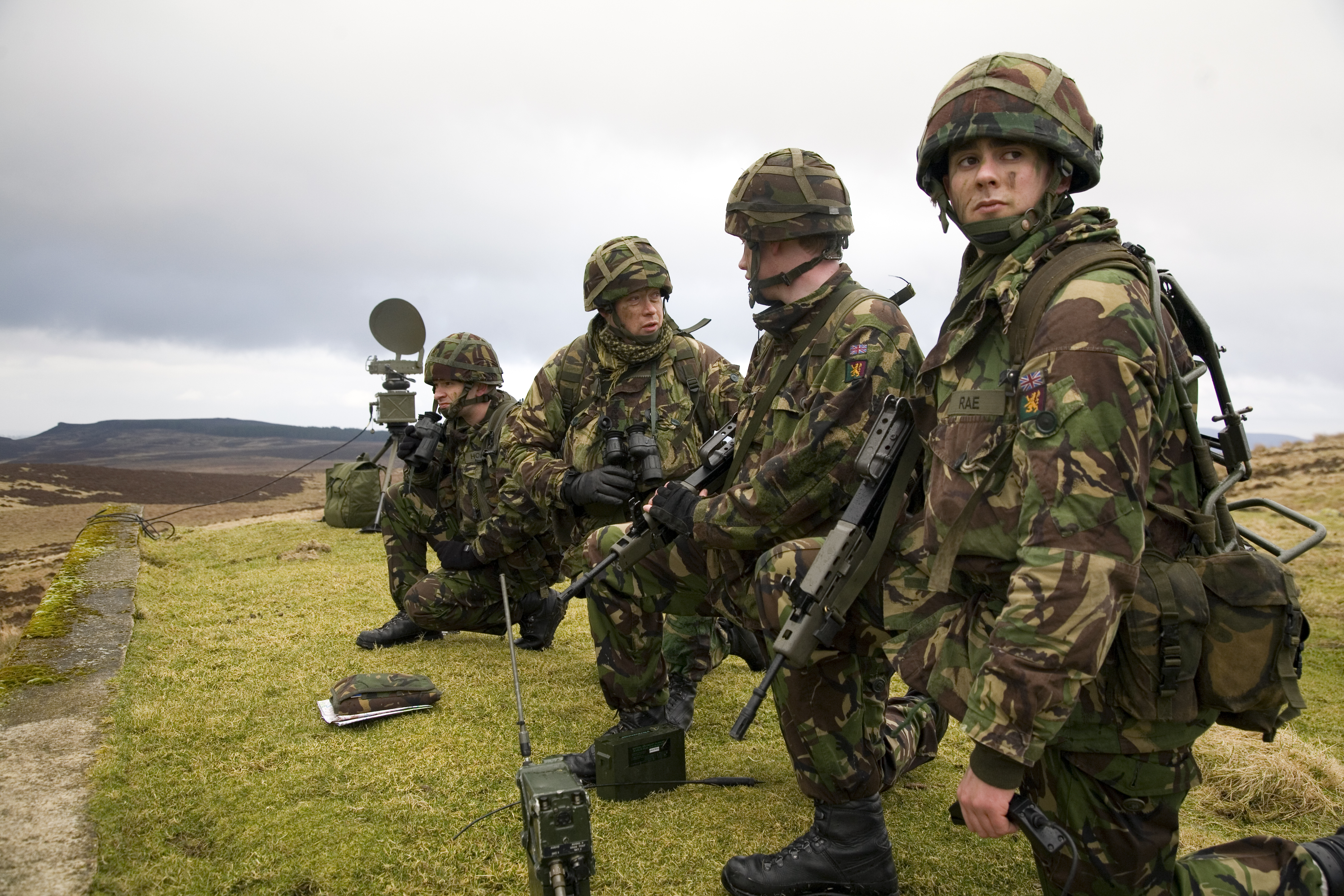

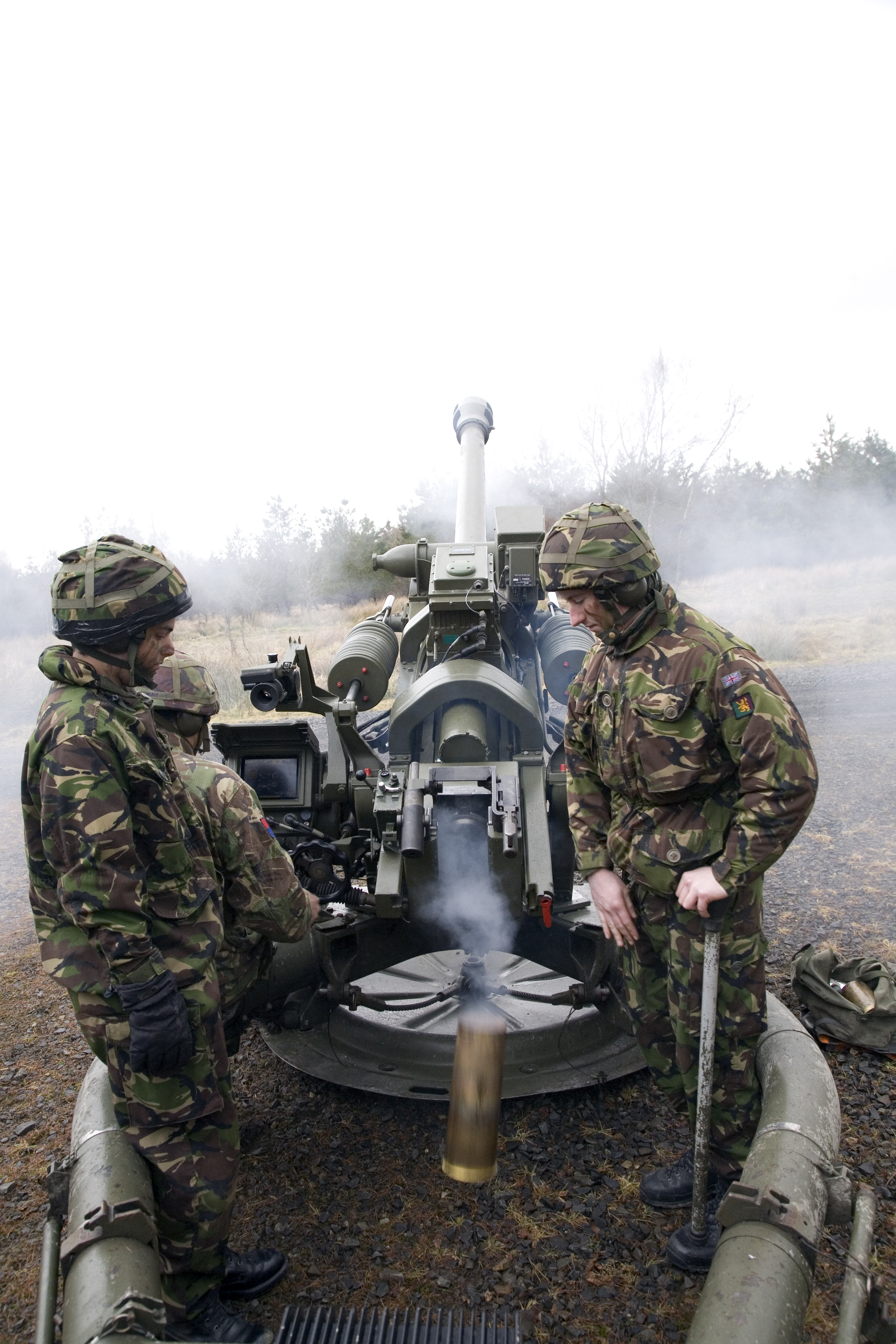

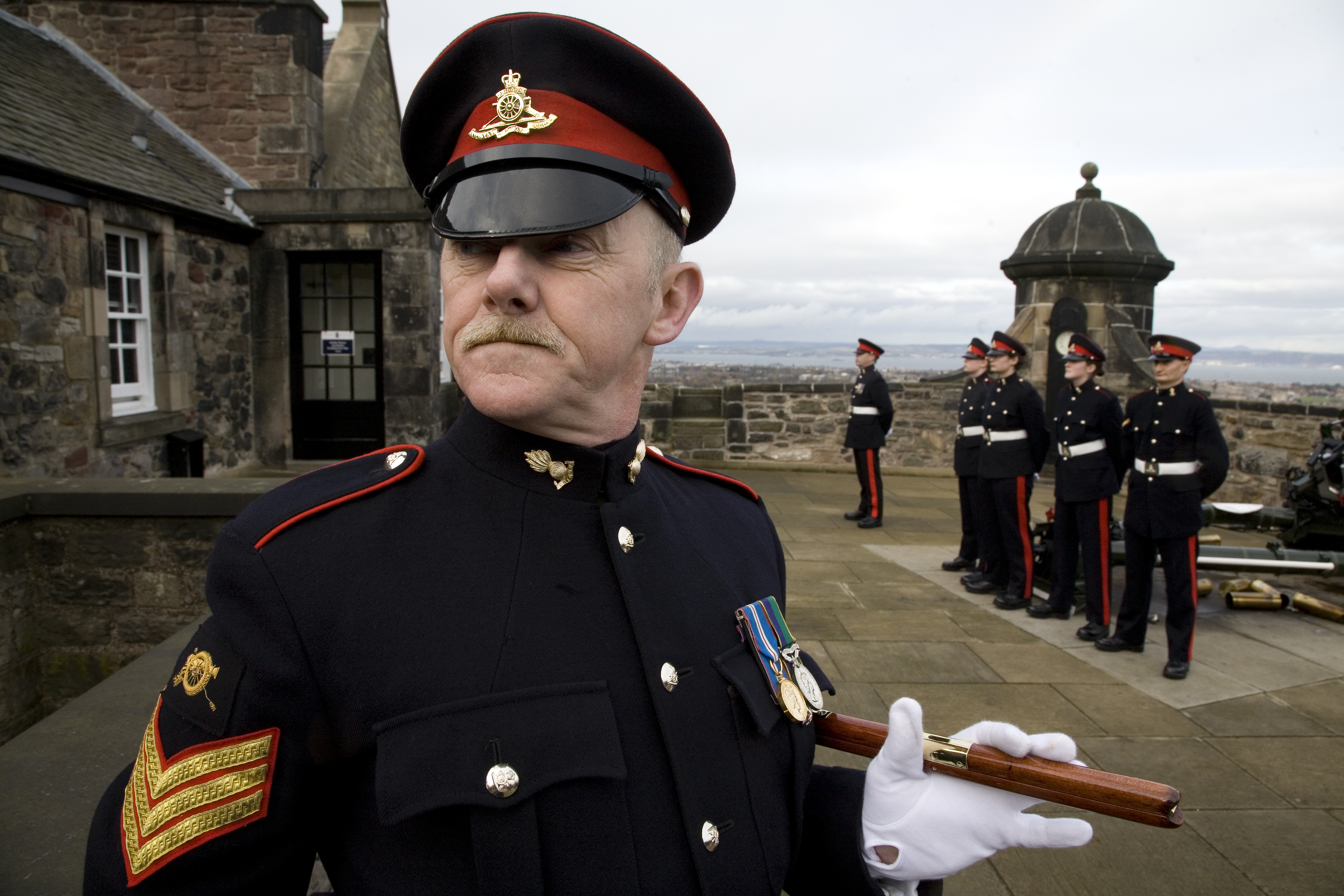

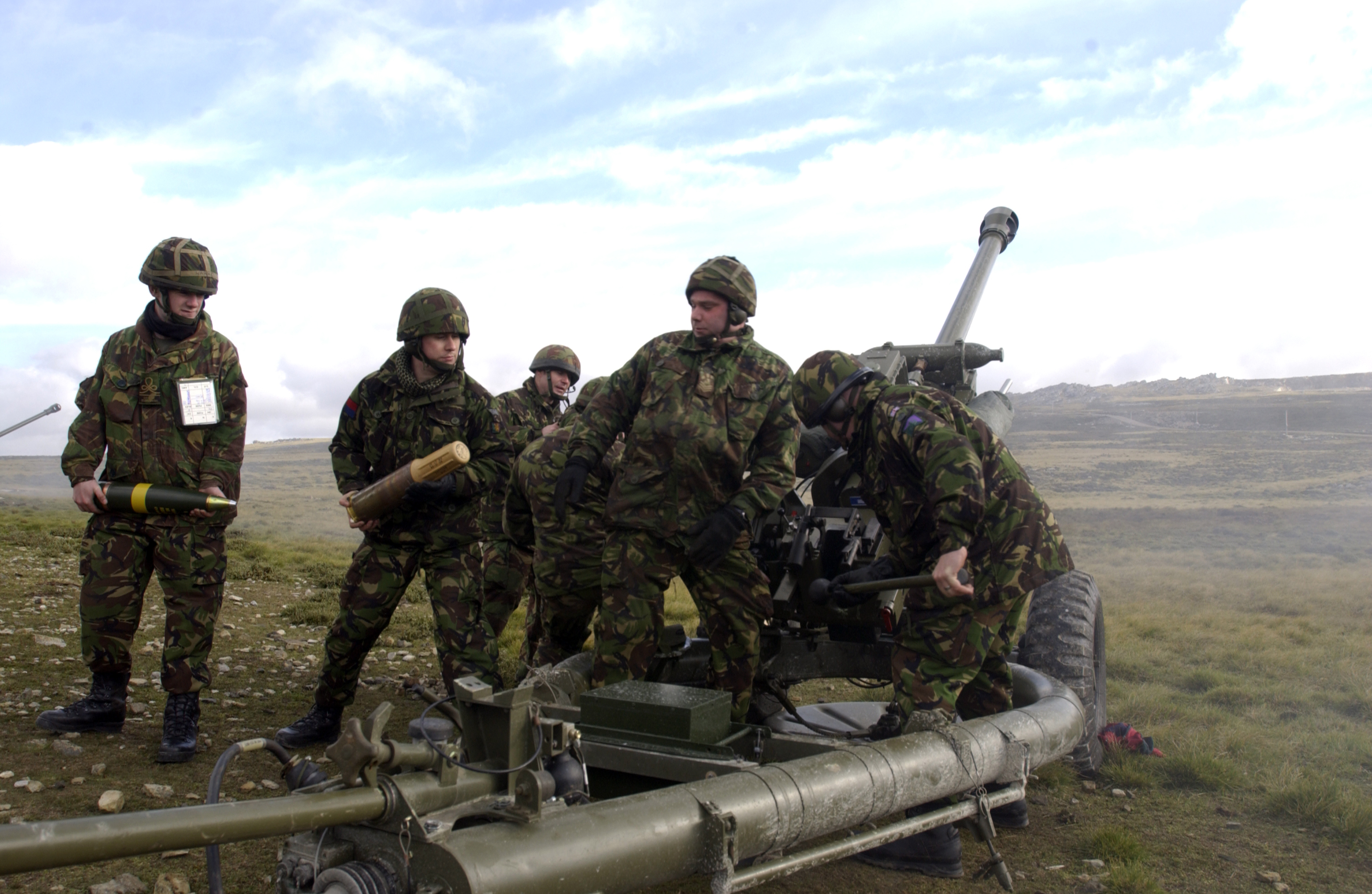

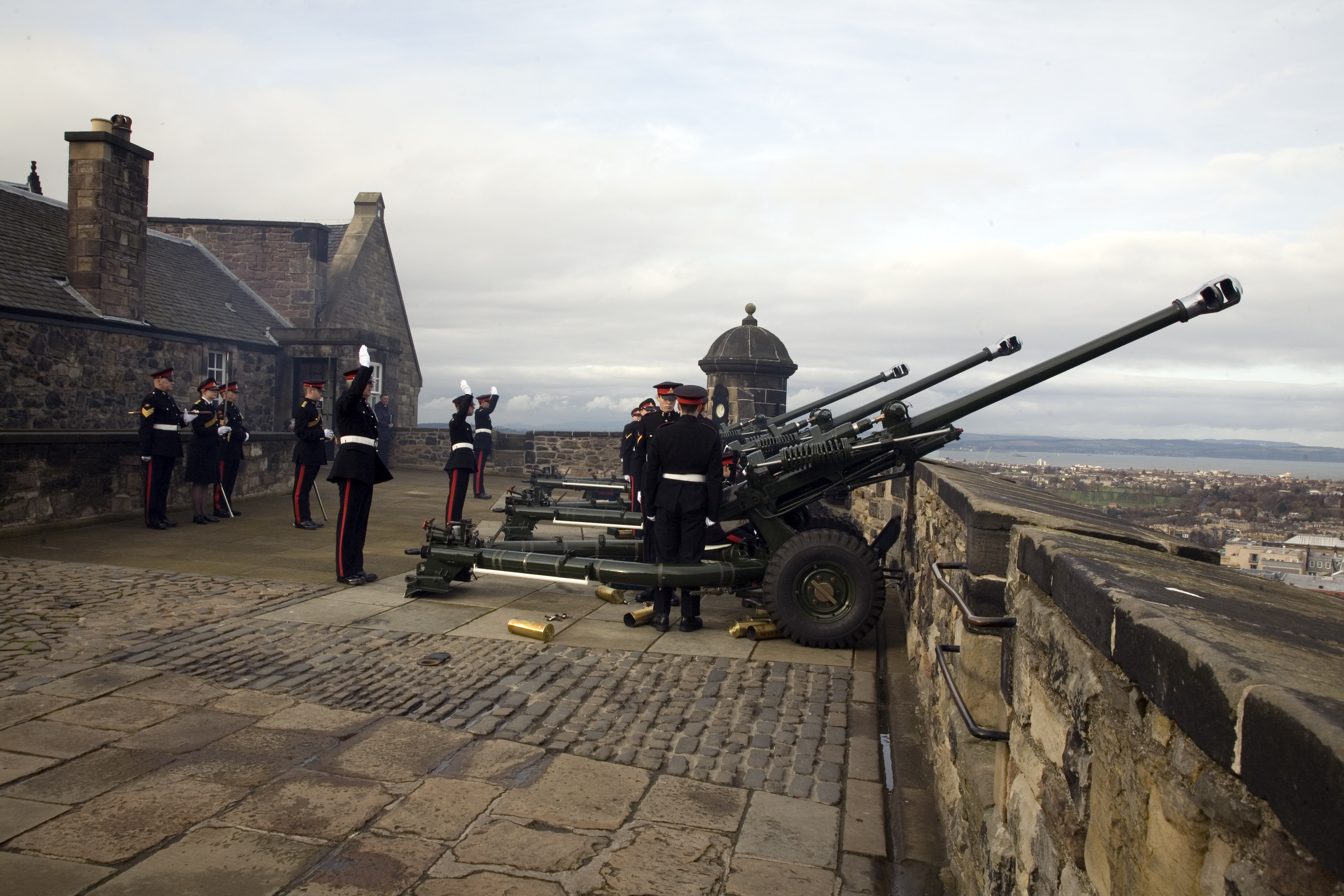

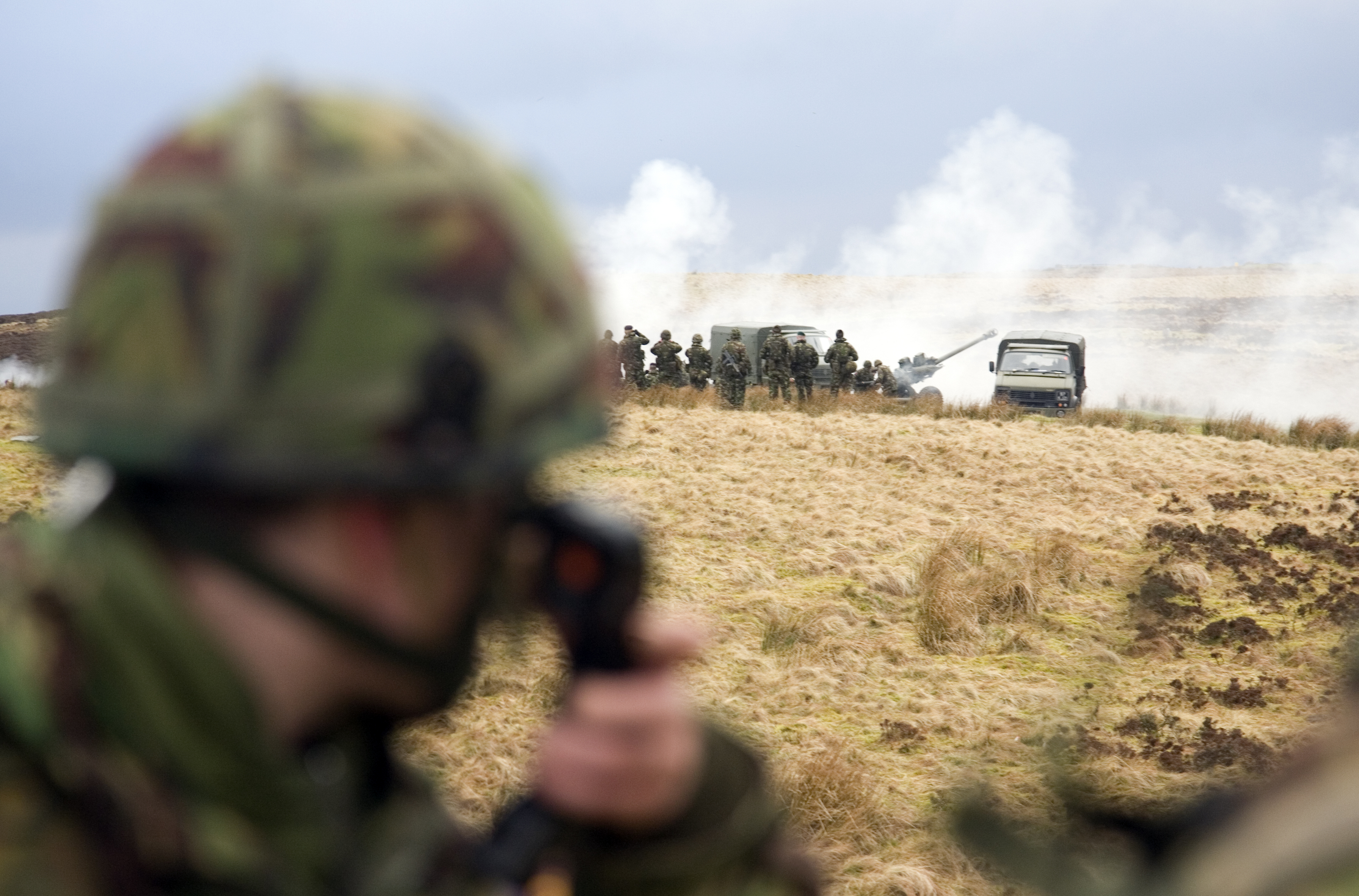

== Publications ==
- Litchfield, Norman E H, 1992. The Territorial Artillery 1908-1988, The Sherwood Press, Nottingham. ISBN 0-9508205-2-0
