= 40th Regiment Royal Artillery =

- Active: 1 April 1947 – December 2012
- Country: United Kingdom
- Branch: British Army
- Type: Artillery
- Role: Field artillery
- Size: 4 Batteries
- Part of: 19 Light Brigade
- Garrison/HQ: Thiepval Barracks, Lisburn, Northern Ireland
- Nickname: The Lowland Gunners
- Equipment: eighteen L118 Light Guns, MSTAR radars
- Engagements: Suez Crisis; EOKA; Indonesia-Malaysia confrontation Falklands War; Yugoslav Wars; Gulf War; Iraq War (Op TELIC); Afghanistan War (Op HERRICK)

Insignia
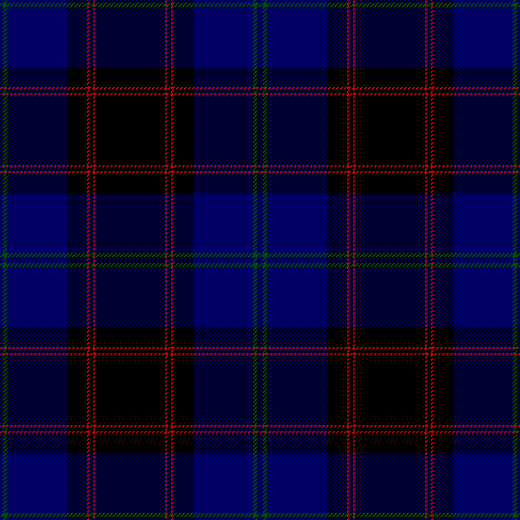
- Tartan: Clan Home

40th Regiment Royal Artillery – The Lowland Gunners – was a regiment of the Royal Artillery in the British Army. It supported 19 Light Brigade in the field artillery role. It was structured into Fire Support Teams equipped with MSTAR, and the regiment's three gun batteries, equipped with eighteen L118 Light Guns. The Clan Home tartan was worn by the regiment.

== History ==
The regiment, formed in April 1947, was based at Home Lines, Thiepval Barracks, Lisburn, County Antrim. Following the 2010 SDSR review, it was announced in July 2011 that 40 Regt would disband along with elements of 19 Light Brigade.

== Batteries ==
- 6/36 (Arcot) Battery - Re-subordinated to 4th Regiment RA as a Tac Battery, losing its guns and retaining just its forward observation parties.
- 137 (Java) Battery - Re-subordinated to 26th Regiment RA, however in February 2015 the Battery was placed into suspended animation.
- 38 (Seringapatam) Battery - Re-subordinated to 19th Regiment RA.
- 49 (Inkerman) Battery - Re-subordinated to the Joint Ground Based Air Defence formation as an independent sub unit and rerolled as a LEAPP Battery. It has since been resubordinated to 16th Regiment RA which also sits under 7th Air Defence Group.

129 (Dragon) Battery RA was previously part of the regiment, and has since resubordinated to 4th Regiment RA as a Tactical Group Battery, comprising Fire Support Teams (forward observation parties) that support manoeuvre formations.
