= 206 (Ulster) Battery Royal Artillery =

British Army reserve artillery battery

- Active: 1 April 1967-Present
- Country: United Kingdom
- Branch: British Army
- Type: Artillery
- Role: Field Artillery
- Size: One Battery
- Part of: 105th Regiment Royal Artillery
- Nickname: The Ulster Gunners
- Equipment: L118 Light Gun.

206 (Ulster) Battery Royal Artillery is an Army Reserve sub-unit, part of the 105th Regiment Royal Artillery. The battery is spread between two locations, Newtownards and Coleraine.

== History ==
Formed on 1 April 1967 as 206 (Coleraine) Light Air Defence Battery Royal Artillery (Volunteers) from 245 (Ulster) Light Air Defence Regiment RA (TA), the battery was originally part of 102 (Ulster and Scottish) Light Air Defence Regiment Royal Artillery (Volunteers). On 1 April 1993 the battery transferred to 105 (Scottish) Air Defence Regiment Royal Artillery (Volunteers) after the disbandment of 102 Regiment. 206 (Ulster) Battery formed HQ and A Troop at Newtownards with B Troop at Coleraine.

It has been re-roled from an air-defence battery to a field artillery battery using the L118 light gun.

The battery received the freedom of Coleraine in 1992. It carries the honour of firing regular royal salutes at Hillsborough Castle.

== Bibliography ==
- Litchfield, Norman E H, 1992. The Territorial Artillery 1908-1988, The Sherwood Press, Nottingham. ISBN 0-9508205-2-0
