= John Mead (British Army officer) =

British general (born 1971)

Lieutenant General John Mead CB OBE
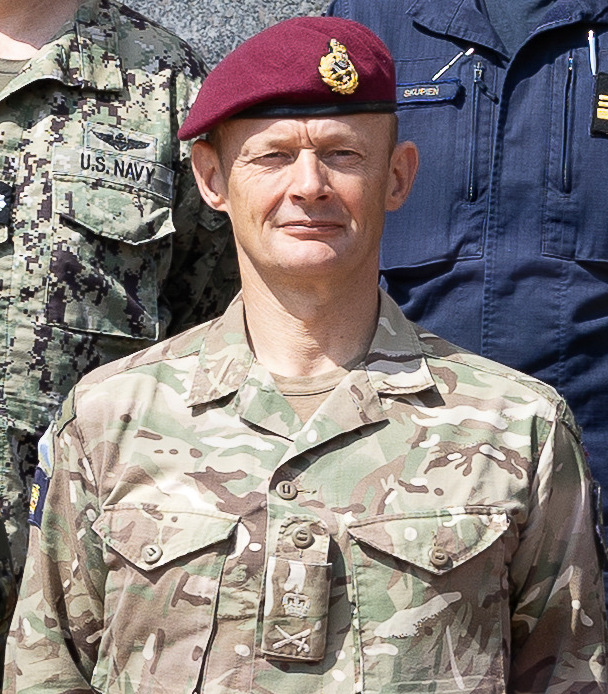
- Lieutenant General Mead in 2026
- Born: 21 September 1971 (age 55); Hillingdon, London, England
- Military career
- Allegiance: United Kingdom
- Branch: British Army
- Rank: Lieutenant General
- Service number: 537468
- Unit: Royal Regiment of Artillery
- Commands: 1st Artillery Brigade (2017–2019)
- Conflicts: Bosnian War; Kosovo War; Iraq War; War in Afghanistan

Lieutenant General John Robert Mead, CB, OBE (born 21 September 1971) is a British senior British Army officer. Since December 2024, he has served as deputy commander of the Allied Joint Force Command Brunssum, a NATO formation.

== Early life and education ==
Mead was born on 21 September 1971 in Hillingdon, London, England. He was educated at Abbotsfield Comprehensive School, an all-boys school in Hillingdon, and at Dr Challoner's Grammar School, an all-boys selective school in Amersham, Buckinghamshire.

== Military career ==
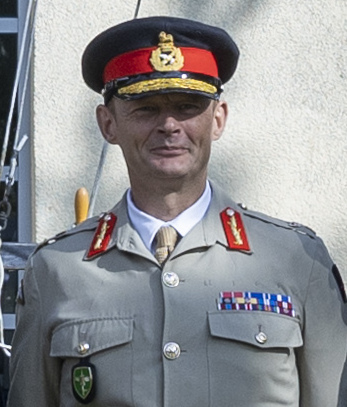
Mead in 2025

On 14 December 1991, having attended the Royal Military Academy Sandhurst, Mead was commissioned as a second lieutenant in the Royal Regiment of Artillery, British Army. From 1991 to 1994, he served as a troop commander with 29th Commando Regiment Royal Artillery, a commando trained unit that is part of 3 Commando Brigade. He was promoted to lieutenant on 14 December 1993. He undertook operational service in Bosnia, Kosovo, Iraq and Afghanistan; he served five tours in the latter country during the War in Afghanistan. He was promoted to captain on 14 December 1996, and to major on 31 July 2002. He attended staff college in Australia in 2004.

He undertook regimental duties with 7th Parachute Regiment Royal Horse Artillery, and was commanding officer of 3rd Regiment Royal Horse Artillery from 2011 to 2014. He was commander of the 1st Artillery Brigade from 2016 to 2018.

On 28 August 2019, he was appointed chief of staff for the Allied Rapid Reaction Corps, and promoted to major general. On 6 December 2024, he was appointed deputy commander of the Allied Joint Force Command Brunssum, a NATO formation, in succession to Lieutenant General Luis Lanchares.

== Honours ==
In the 2011 Queen's Birthday Honours, Mead was appointed Officer of the Order of the British Empire (OBE). In the 2024 New Year Honours, he was appointed Companion of the Order of the Bath (CB).

In February 2015, he was awarded the Queen's Commendation for Valuable Service "in recognition of gallant and distinguished services in Afghanistan during the period 1 October 2013 to 30 June 2014".
