= 4/73 (Sphinx) Special Observation Post Battery Royal Artillery =

British Army artillery battery

4/73 (Sphinx) Special OP Battery RA
- Active: 1982 – Present
- Country: United Kingdom
- Branch: British Army
- Type: Artillery
- Role: STA Patrols
- Size: Battery
- Part of: 5th Regiment Royal Artillery
- Location: Catterick Garrison
- Nicknames: Sphinx Battery, STA Patrols, Special OP's, Special Observers.
- Motto: Lateo
- Anniversaries: 4 (Sphinx) Battery Alexandria Day 1 July; 73 (Sphinx) Battery Alexandria Day 10 June
- Battle honours: Ubique

4/73 (Sphinx) Special Observation Post Battery Royal Artillery is a Surveillance and Target Acquisition (STA) unit of the British Army. It fields the British Army with long-range STA Patrols which provide specialist surveillance, reconnaissance and joint fires in high-threat environments. It is part of 5th Regiment Royal Artillery and is based at Catterick Garrison in North Yorkshire.

== Organisation ==
4/73 Battery comprises a Battery Headquarters and three Patrols Troops which provide support to 1st Deep Reconnaissance Strike Brigade Combat Team (1DRS BCT) and the Warfighting Division - 3rd (United Kingdom) Division among others.

== Role ==
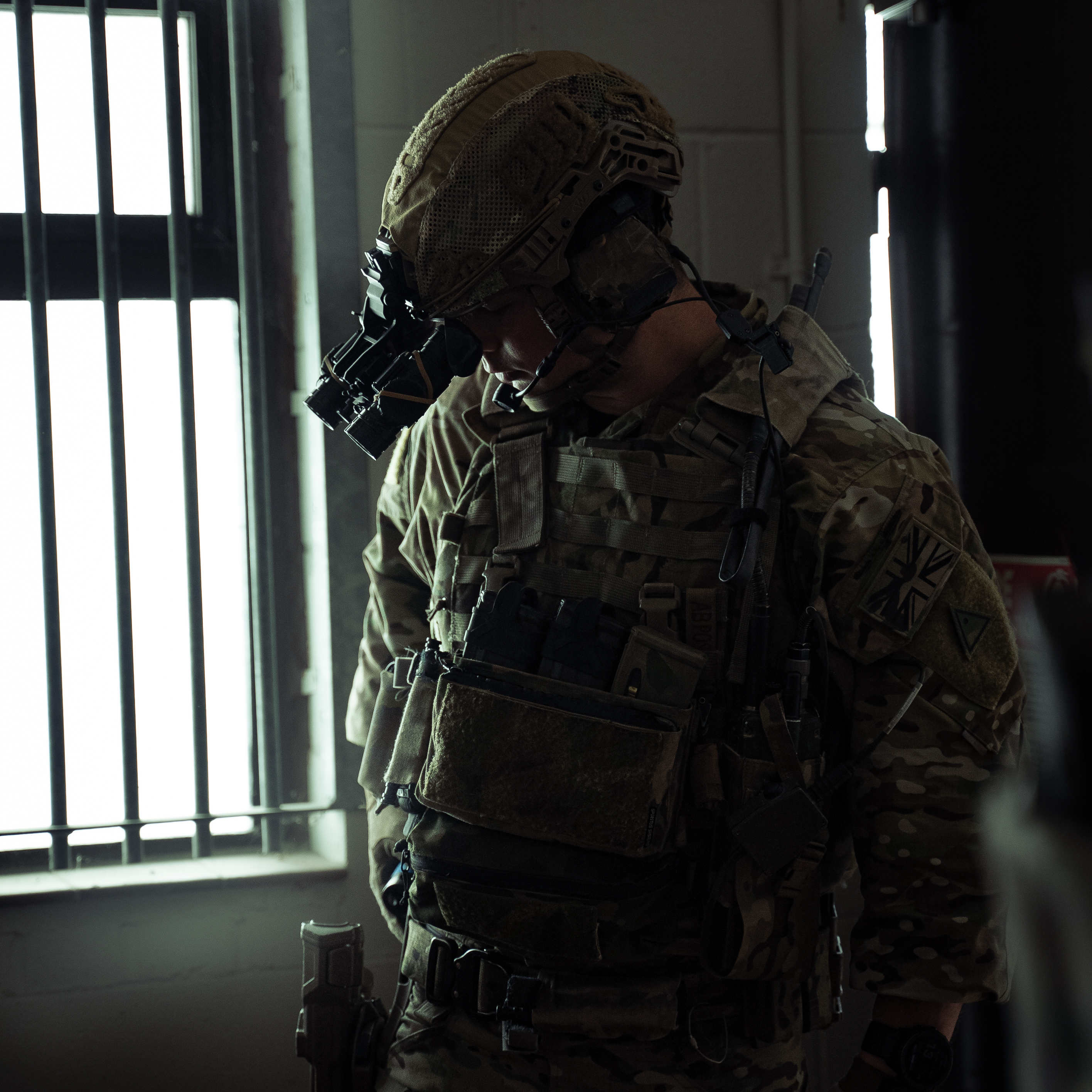
A Special Observer preparing for a reconnaissance task.

Special Observers give commanders the ability to deploy closely at range, regardless of weather conditions. Working as the intelligence, surveillance, target acquisition, and reconnaissance (ISTAR) asset in each of the brigades, the STA Patrols Troop are subject matter experts on Static Covert Surveillance (SCS) and complement the reconnaissance activity conducted by other Ground Manned Reconnaissance (GMR) forces in the Brigade.

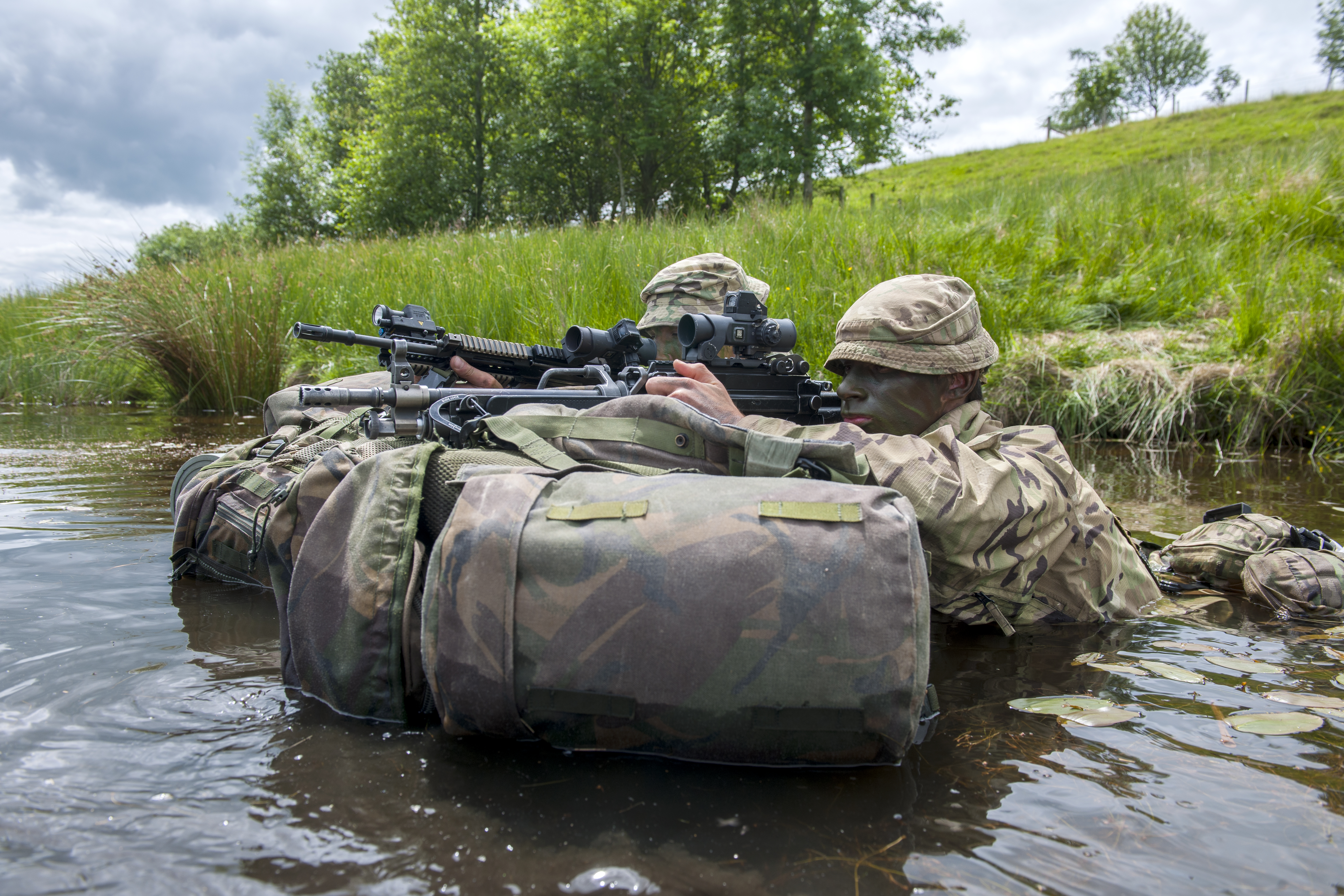
4/73 Battery Royal Artillery alert in the Warcop Training Area, during a two-week exercise in 2017.

The skill set includes:

- manned observation post (OPs)
- real time transmission of information
- comprehensive technical surveillance, through use of: long lens optics, cameras and data transfer systems, to provide imagery of evidential quality
- deployment of Long Range Electro Optical (LREO) systems: covert remote cameras and sensors
- initiation of the full spectrum of joint fires
- conduct of battle damage assessment (BDA)
- trained in Survive, Evade, Resist, Extract (SERE)

== Insignia ==
Whilst most gunners wear a dark blue beret, since 2008 soldiers of 4/73 Battery have worn a khaki beret to mark the close working relationship of the battery with the Honourable Artillery Company (HAC). Soldiers that have passed the Surveillance Reconnaissance Patrol selection course also wear the Special Observers badge in perpetuity on their arm in all orders of dress.

== History ==
In early 1970s, I Corps General Support Artillery Regiment was based in the foothills of the Harz in the town of Hildesheim close to the inner German border. This included 5 Regiment RA whose role as part of the NATO General Development Plan (GDP) in the event of war, was to contribute to imposing delay on the advancing Warsaw Pact forces. Operating deep inside enemy territory, however, required specialist training at that time only undertaken by the Corps Patrol Unit, consisting of 21 SAS(R), 23 SAS(R) and the HAC.

By 1980, the Commanding Officer of 5th Regiment Royal Artillery, Lt Colonel A C P Stone, prepared a detailed paper setting out the case that the Regiment required special observation post soldiers. This new unit would dig underground shelters close to the inner German border and allow the advancing enemy forces to pass by them. Following this, two pairs of Gunners would emerge from each underground patrol shelter to direct the fire from the Regiment's artillery. Thus, in 1982, the Special Observation Post Troop was founded to take on that role as part of 5th Regiment Royal Artillery (RA). The unit was stationed in Hildesheim, close to the IGB. From 1985 onward, two Special OP Troops would have guided the artillery fire of their respective parent units (5th and 32 Reg RA) from their underground shelters on the IGB. In 1989, Captain D B Jones, suggested to his Commanding Officer, that there should only be one Special observation post organisation and that ideally it should be based back in Hildesheim near the operational deployment area. In April 1991, two troops were merged, forming 73 (Sphinx) Special OP Battery RA.

=== Recent deployments ===
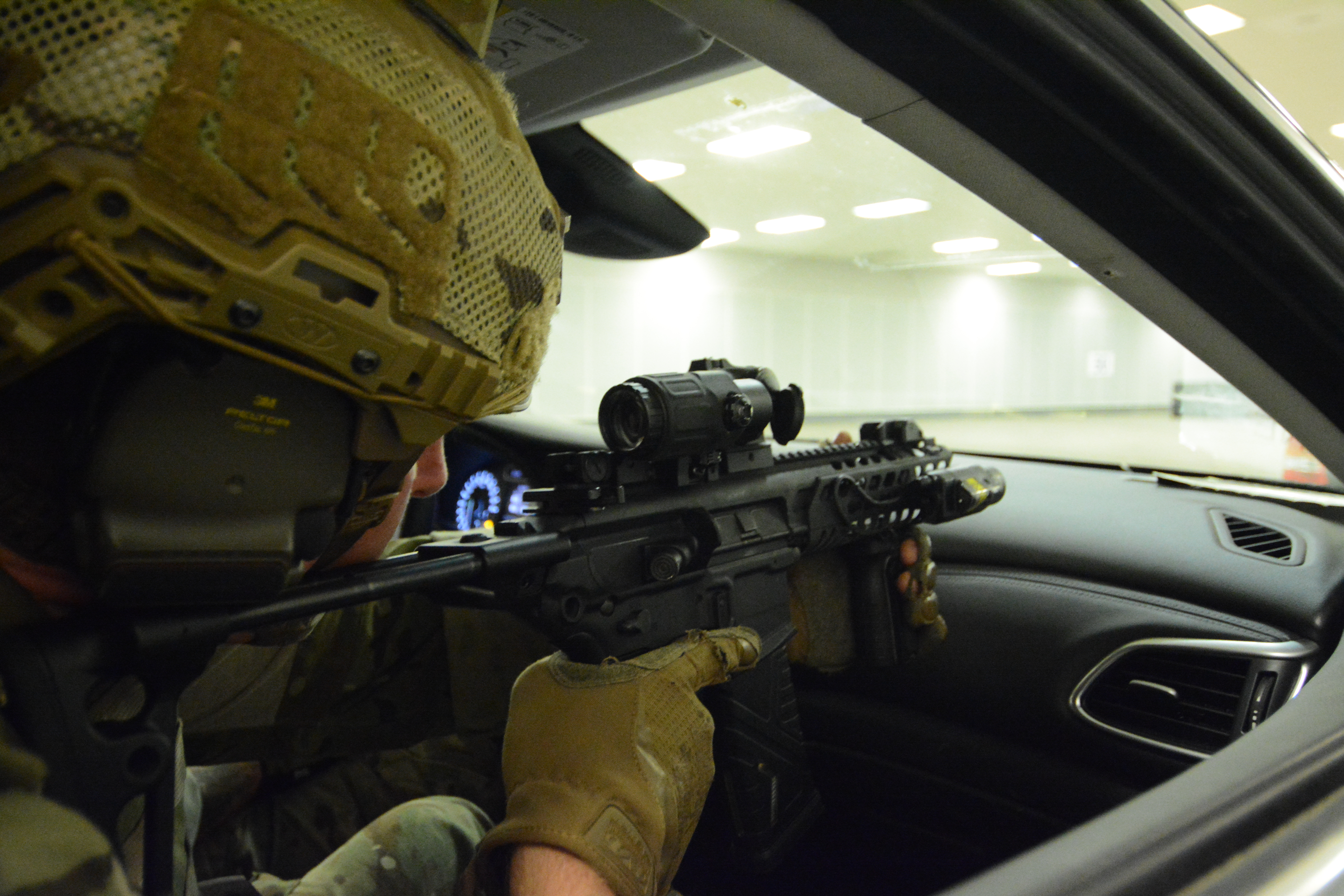
Special Observers conducting urban vehicle ranges.

The battery deployed on Operation Herrick 7 where two personnel serving with the battery were killed in separate mine strike incidents, as well as three seriously injured. During the tour the battery mounted the longest uninterrupted long-range desert patrol since World War II, living off their WMIK vehicles for seven weeks without any operational pause.

== See also ==
- 148 (Meiktila) Battery Royal Artillery
- Brigade Patrol Troop
- Pathfinder Platoon
- Stay-behind
