= 105th Regiment Royal Artillery =

British Army reserve artillery regiment

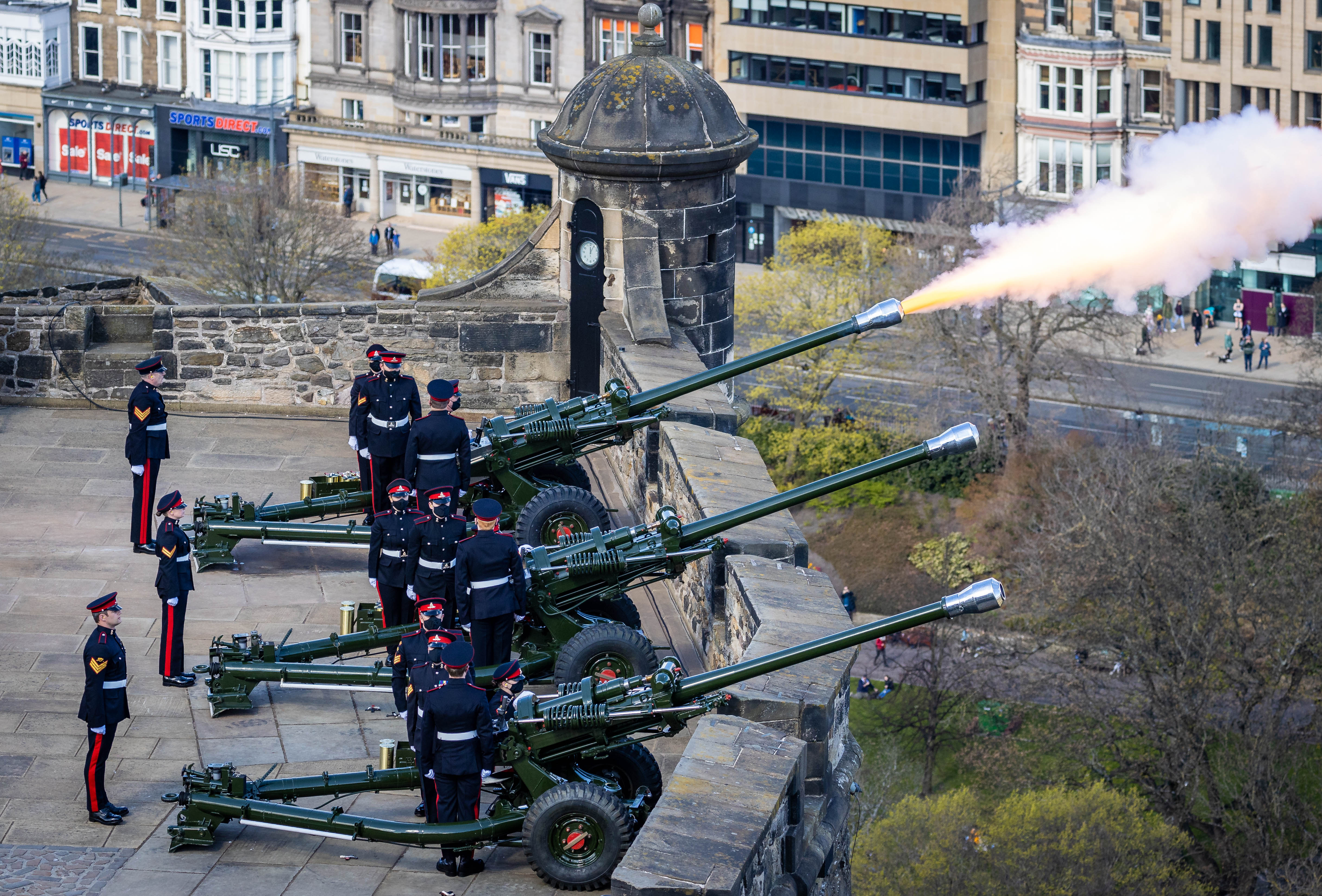
- 105 Regiment Royal Artillery firing a Death Gun Salute at Edinburgh Castle to mark the death of Prince Philip in April 2021.
- Active: 1986–Present
- Country: United Kingdom
- Branch: British Army: Royal Artillery
- Type: Field Artillery Regiment
- Size: 4 batteries 466 personnel
- Part of: 1st Artillery Brigade
- Regimental Headquarters: Edinburgh
- Nicknames: "The Scottish and Ulster Gunners"
- Equipment: L118 Light Gun.

105th Regiment Royal Artillery (The Scottish & Ulster Gunners) is part of the Army Reserve and has sub-units throughout Scotland and Northern Ireland. It is currently equipped with the L118 Light Gun.

== History ==
The regiment was first formed as the 105 (Scottish) Air Defence Regiment Royal Artillery (Volunteers) on 1 April 1986 with its Regimental Headquarters at Artillery House, near Redford Barracks in Edinburgh. Its units were 207 (City of Glasgow) Air Defence Battery at Glasgow, 212 (Highland) Air Defence Battery at Arbroath and 218 (Lothian) Air Defence Battery at Livingston. It was equipped with a succession of missile systems, Blowpipe, Javelin and finally the Starstreak missile until 2005. In 1987 219 (City of Dundee) Air Defence Battery was formed at Dundee and joined the regiment.

After the Options for Change defence review in 1993, 206 (Ulster) Battery transferred to the regiment from 102nd (Ulster) Air Defence Regiment. At that time 219 Battery disbanded and the regiment was renamed 105 Regiment Royal Artillery (Volunteers). 218 Battery was disbanded in 2005 when the Regiment re-roled to field artillery. 105 Regiment was then equipped with the L118 105mm Light Gun. From 1 March 2015, the regiment has been paired with 3rd Regiment Royal Horse Artillery.

Under Army 2020, a new battery, 278 (Lowland) Battery Royal Artillery based in Livingston joined this regiment. The battery continued the traditions of the old 278th (Lowland) Regiment (The City of Edinburgh Artillery).

== Batteries ==
The current organisation of the regiment is as follows:

- Regimental Headquarters, at Artillery House, Redford Barracks, Edinburgh
- 206 (Ulster) Battery Royal Artillery, in Newtownards
  - B Troop, in Coleraine
- 207 (City of Glasgow) Battery Royal Artillery, in Glasgow
- 212 (Highland) Battery Royal Artillery, in Arbroath
  - F Troop, in Kirkcaldy
  - G Troop, at Fort Charlotte, Lerwick
- 278 (Lowland) Battery Royal Artillery, in Livingston
  - I Troop, at Redford Barracks, Edinburgh

== See also ==
- Armed forces in Scotland
- Military history of Scotland

== Publications ==
- Litchfield, Norman E H, 1992. The Territorial Artillery 1908–1988, The Sherwood Press, Nottingham. ISBN 0-9508205-2-0
