= 102nd (Ulster) Air Defence Regiment Royal Artillery =

- Active: 1967-1993
- Allegiance: United Kingdom
- Branch: British Army
- Role: Air defence
- Size: 3 Batteries
- Garrison/HQ: Newtownards, Northern Ireland
- Equipment: Javelin surface-to-air missile

102nd (Ulster) Air Defence Regiment Royal Artillery was part of the Territorial Army and used to have sub-units initially in Scotland and Northern Ireland and, latterly, just in Northern Ireland.

== History ==
The regiment was formed as 102 (Ulster and Scottish) Light Air Defence Regiment Royal Artillery (Volunteers) in 1967, from the amalgamation of 245 (Ulster) Light Air Defence Regiment RA, 445 (Lowland) Light Air Defence Regiment RA, and 278 (Lowland) Field Regiment RA (The City of Edinburgh Artillery). Its units initially were Headquarters Battery at Newtownards, 206 (Ulster) Light Air Defence Battery at Coleraine and 207 (Scottish) Light Air Defence Battery in Glasgow. The regiment was equipped with the Javelin surface-to-air missile.

In 1969 212 Battery was formed at Arbroath from the Highland Regiment RA and joined the regiment. The regiment was renamed 102 (Ulster and Scottish) Air Defence Regiment Royal Artillery (Volunteers) in 1976. In 1986 207 Battery and 212 Battery (the Scottish-based batteries) left the regiment and 215 Battery was formed at Newtownards and joined the regiment at which point the regiment was renamed 102nd (Ulster) Air Defence Regiment Royal Artillery. The regiment was disbanded under Options for Change in 1993.

== Batteries ==
Immediately prior to disbandment its batteries were as follows:

- Headquarters Battery, based at Newtownards - Suspended Animation
- 206 (Coleraine) Battery, based at Coleraine - transferred to 105th Regiment Royal Artillery
- 215 (North Down) Battery, based at Newtownards - Suspended Animation

== Bibliography ==
- Litchfield, Norman E H, 1992. The Territorial Artillery 1908–1988, The Sherwood Press, Nottingham. ISBN 0-9508205-2-0
