= CARVER matrix =

Target acquisition system

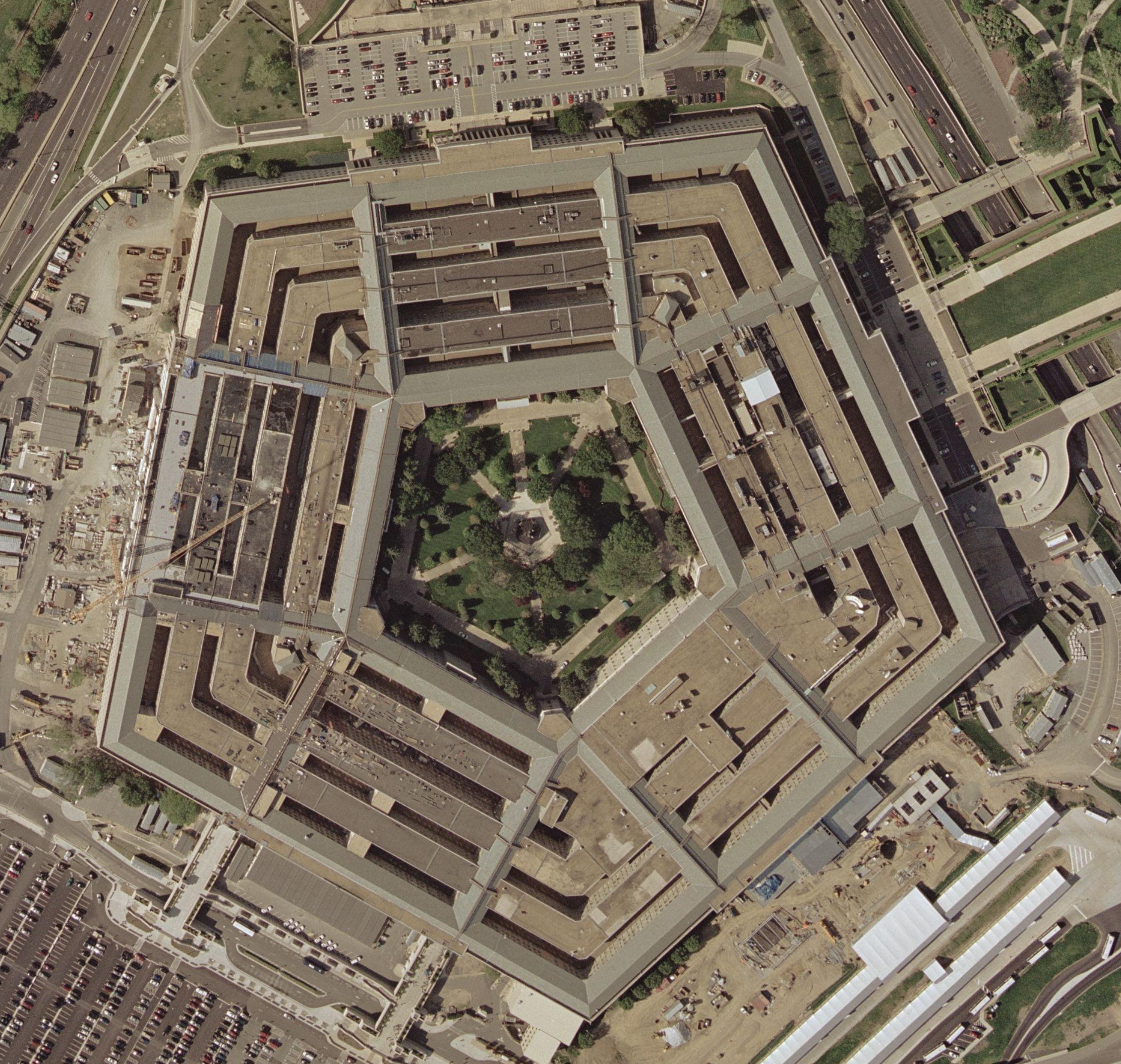
The Pentagon's SOF developed the CARVER matrix to target weaknesses in enemy and friendly targets

The CARVER matrix was developed by the United States Army Special Forces during the Vietnam War. CARVER is an acronym that stands for Criticality, Accessibility, Recuperability, Vulnerability, Effect and Recognizability and is a system to identify and rank specific targets so that attack resources can be efficiently used. CARVER was developed in World War II by the OSS for the French field agents as a simple, uniformly and somewhat quantifiable means of selecting targets for possible interdiction. CARVER can be used from an offensive (what to attack) or defensive (what to protect) perspective.

== History ==
During the Vietnam war the US Army Special Forces required a system of target acquisition that would rank potential targets according to a scale. During the war the CARVER matrix system was developed to fulfil those needs. It has been recently used in targeting terrorist groups like Jemaah Islamiyah.

== Using the system ==
This system has been developed in order to aid Special Operations Forces (SOF) and more recently Department of Energy (DOE), Department of State (DOS), Department of Homeland Security (DHS) and various private and commercial security assets, in target selection and Risk/Vulnerability assessments by calculating the value of a given potential target and the ease with which such a target could be neutralized. Or in other words, it's a logical way of looking at what one might want to do and whether or not it is possible, based on the resources one has to work with. These factors are also the acronym of the system name CARVER: Criticality, Accessibility, Recuperability, Vulnerability, Effect and Recognizability. In the offensive, employing the Carver matrix can help identify targets that are vulnerable to attack and for defensive purposes the Carver matrix can indicate "High Risk" targets that require additional security assets allotted to them to prevent the degradation of said assets via enemy assault or terrorist action . In the below table is an example of such a matrix that uses the CARVER system for striking a Water sanitation center:

Target	C	A	R	V	E	R	Total
Water intake	1	1	3	4	2	1	12
Sanitation processors	3	2	1	5	5	2	18
Power center	2	3	1	2	2	1	11

Looking at the table, the target with the highest score is the Sanitation processors which have a score total of 18. Thus, using the system, more attack resources (time, money, tools, personnel etc.) should be assigned to hit the Sanitation processors.

== Other uses ==
While designed for the military the CARVER matrix can be used for a variety of other purposes including management and setting goals. As long as you have a clear set goal in mind you can apply the system to anything. For example, a manager of a gym wants to increase his sales and membership numbers thus using the Matrix system:

Potential projects	C	A	R	V	E	R	Total
Start website	5	8	4	6	5	7	35
Referral campaign	9	9	7	8	6	9	48
Flier distribution	7	8	4	10	4	10	43

So again looking at the score we can see that starting an aggressive members referral plan would be the best option according to the matrix.

In the book Unleash the Warrior Within, Richard Machowicz identified that for most situations in life, simply grading one's choices by Criticality & Effect-on-goal/happiness is enough: one needn't do the entire matrix, as these 2 elements are the most significant.

The CARVER matrix has also formed the basis of other risk and vulnerability assessment systems including the SCALE system.

== See also ==
- Nuclear utilization target selection
- Surveillance and target acquisition

== Bibliography ==
- Bennett, Brian T. (2007). Understanding, assessing, and responding to terrorism: protecting critical infrastructure and personnel (2007 ed.). John Wiley & Sons. ISBN 978-0-471-77152-4. - Total pages: 466
- Fay, John (2007). Encyclopedia of security management (2007 ed.). Butterworth-Heinemann. ISBN 978-0-12-370860-1. - Total pages: 649
- Michaelis, Dean (2000). The Complete .50-Caliber Sniper Course: Hard-Target Interdiction (2000 ed.). Paladin Press. ISBN 1-58160-068-2. - Total pages: 576
- Sullivan, Michael P. (December 2007). "How to win and know it: an effects-based approach to irregular warfare" (PDF). United States Navy. Naval Postgraduate School. Archived from the original (PDF) on June 23, 2010.
- Martel, Mike (August 2012). "How Does a SF A-Team Take Down a National Level Target?" (web).
