= 50th Missile Regiment Royal Artillery =

50th Regiment Royal Artillery
- Active: 1 April 1947 – 31 March 1993
- Allegiance: United Kingdom
- Branch: British Army
- Type: Artillery
- Garrison/HQ: Northumberland Barracks, Menden (1959-c.1993)

50 Missile Regiment Royal Artillery (sometimes nicknamed '50 Miserable') was an artillery regiment of the British Army. From the late 1950s it was stationed with the British Army of the Rhine in Germany, at Northumberland Barracks, Menden, equipped with 8-inch towed howitzers, the Honest John, and, from 1976, the MGM-52 Lance surface to surface missile.

== History ==
On 1 April 1947 RHQ 4th Heavy Anti-Aircraft Regiment RA was redesignated RHQ 50th Heavy Anti-Aircraft Regiment RA. It was located at Stoneleigh Park Camp, Coventry.

In April 1952 while stationed at Troon it was converted to a medium regiment, with BL 5.5-inch Medium Guns. In 1959 it was moved to Northumberland Barracks, Menden, gaining the Honest John missile soon afterwards, and there in 1964 it was redesignated a missile regiment. Almost as soon as the regiment became a missile artillery regiment, it moved to the 4th Armoured Division.

24 Missile Regiment RA was amalgamated in February 1977 with 50 Regiment, as the Honest John was phased out. In the early 1980s it was part of the Artillery Division. Still stationed at Menden in 1991, it was placed in suspended animation in 1993. Towards the end of its history the regiment gained the nickname of the "Lincolnshire and Humberside Gunners" when it started recruiting mainly from that area. 8th (Volunteer) Battalion, The Queen's Fusiliers (City of London), a shared TA infantry battalion between the Queen's Regiment and the Royal Regiment of Fusiliers, with its headquarters at the TA Centre at St. John's Hill, Clapham Junction, provided guards & security for the regiment in the late 1980s.
