= 19th Regiment Royal Artillery =

British Army artillery regiment

- Active: 1900 - Present
- Allegiance: United Kingdom
- Branch: British Army
- Type: Field artillery
- Size: 5 Batteries; 519 personnel
- Part of: 3rd Deep Reconnaissance Strike Brigade
- Garrison/HQ: Larkhill, Wiltshire
- Nickname: The Scottish Gunners (sometimes referred to as the Highland Gunners)
- Equipment: Archer Artillery System and MSTAR radar

Insignia
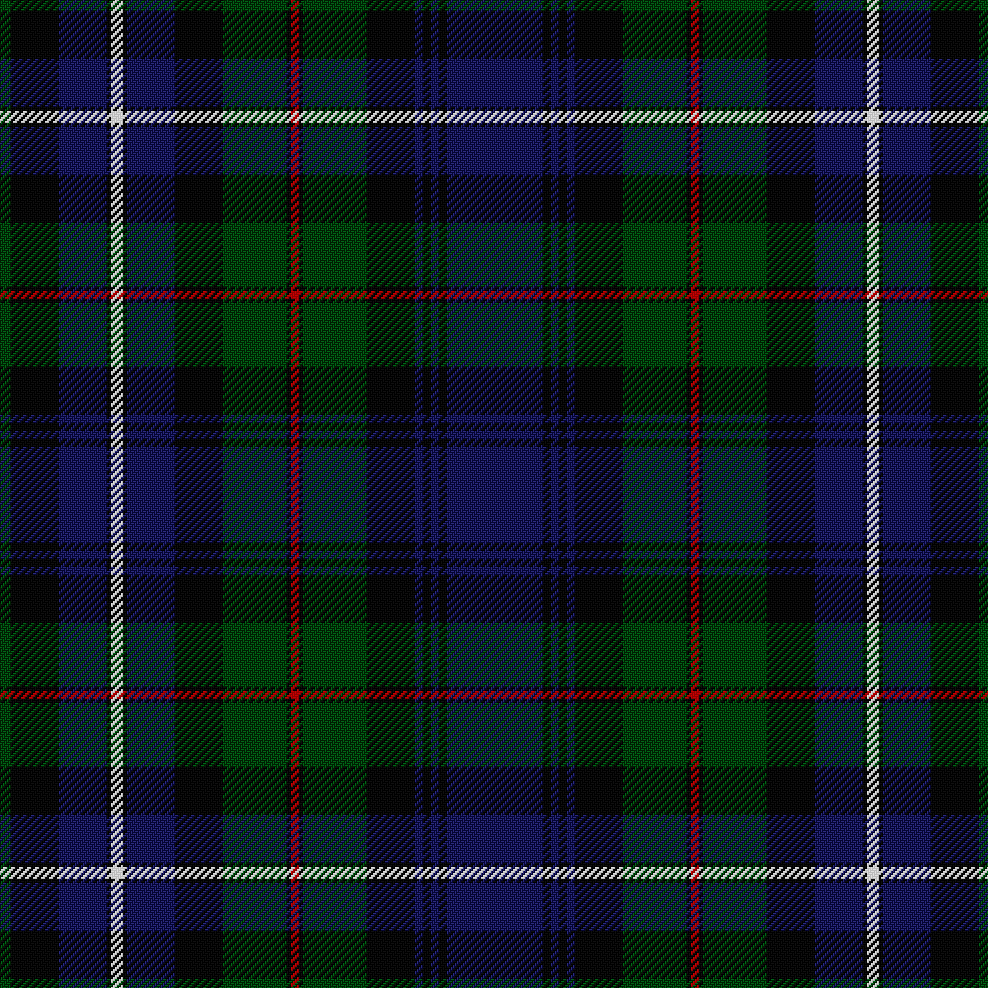
- Tartan: Robertson hunting tartan

19th Regiment Royal Artillery – The Scottish Gunners (sometimes referred to as the “Highland Gunners”) – is a Scottish regiment of the Royal Artillery in the British Army. It currently supports 12 Mechanised Brigade in the armoured field artillery role. The regiment has Fire Support Teams mounted in Warrior Mechanised Artillery Observation Vehicles equipped with MSTAR. The regiment's three gun batteries are equipped with the Archer Artillery System.

== History ==
19th Regiment traces its history to 17 Brigade Royal Field Artillery which was formed in 1900 but the individual batteries date back to the 18th century. The brigade saw action during World War I. During World War II, the four pre-war batteries combined into two. In May 1940 it had the honour of being the first artillery regiment to fire in the war while stationed at the Maginot Line. It served during the North African and Italian campaigns.

The regiment was renumbered to 19 Regiment in 1947. During the 1950s and 1960s it served in the Korean War and Aden Emergency. With the phasing out of National Service in 1963, 19th Regiment was allocated the recruitment area of the Scottish Highlands.

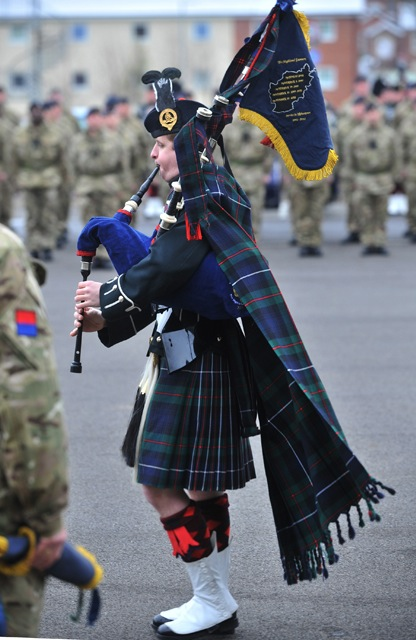
A piper of The Scottish Gunners at the parade commemorating its renaming in 2012

In 1995, the regiment was deployed to Bosnia at short notice as part of Operation Deliberate Force. It was deployed to Cyprus in 1998 as part of UNFICYP. Since the 2000s, it has served in Iraq and Afghanistan. More recently, the regiment returned from Afghanistan (Op Herrick 16) in October 2012.

In December 2012, the regiment was officially named "The Scottish Gunners" when the 40th Regiment Royal Artillery (The Lowland Gunners) was placed in suspended animation. 38 (Seringapatam) Battery was transferred to 19th Regt. A new banner for the Pipes and Drums was presented and a plaque unveiled at the regiment's barracks to mark the occasion.

In 2019, the regiment was due to move within Wiltshire from Bhurtpore Barracks at Tidworth to new purpose-built barracks at Larkhill.

As part of the Future Soldier Programme, the regiment joined the new 3rd Deep Reconnaissance Strike Brigade on 1 July 2022. In addition the regiment restructured in 2023, gaining 19 (Gibraltar 1779-83) Battery from 26th Regiment, RA as an Ajax equipped Tactical Group Battery.

== Recruitment areas ==
The regiment traditionally recruited from the Highlands as its former nickname suggested but now also recruits from Grampian, Tayside, Fife, central Scotland and Argyll. With 40 Regt "Lowland Gunners" being placed into suspended animation as part of the Army 2020 plans, it became the principal Scottish artillery regiment.

== Freedoms of the Cities ==
19 Regiment RA is the local artillery regiment of the Highlands of Scotland, the Western Isles, Shetland and Orkney. The Regiment has been granted the Freedoms of the Cities of Inverness and Colchester.

== Tartan ==
Bandsmen of the unit wear the hunting Robertson tartan in their dress uniforms (kilts and full plaids). This tartan was inherited from the original Loyal Clan Donnachie Volunteers raised in 1803, a unit of irregulars raised on Clan Robertson–Donnachaidh–Duncan lands.

== Batteries ==
The regiment's batteries are as follows:

- 5 (Gibraltar 1779–1783) Battery Royal Artillery
- 13 (Martinique 1809) Battery Royal Artillery — Headquarters
- 19 (Gibraltar 1779-1783) Battery Royal Artillery
- 28/143 (Tombs's Troop) Battery Royal Artillery
- 127 (Dragon) Battery Royal Artillery

== See also ==
- Armed forces in Scotland
- Military history of Scotland
