= Surveillance and target acquisition =

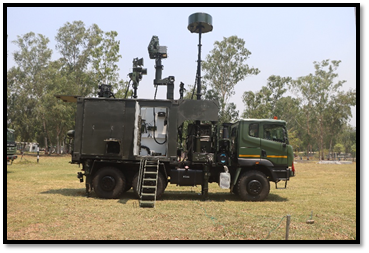
Akashteer C4ISR of the Indian Army

Surveillance and target acquisition (STA) is a military role assigned to units and/or their equipment. It involves watching an area to see what changes (surveillance) and then the acquisition of targets based on that information.

== Artillery STA ==
The role of STA units is to locate, track, assess and where appropriate cue the attack for friendly artillery units.

It provides commanders with surveillance and targeting information across the battle space and is always linked by a robust command-and-control (C2) system to offensive support (OS) systems.

== Units ==
=== Australian Army ===
- 9th Regiment, Royal Australian Artillery
- 20th Regiment, Royal Australian Artillery

=== British Army ===
==== Regular army ====
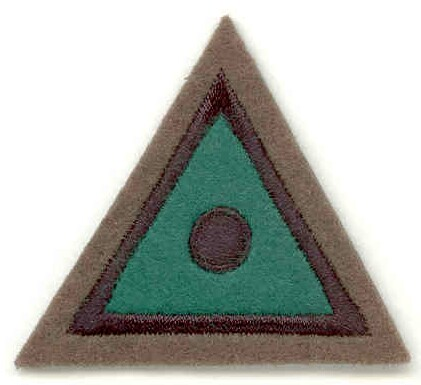
Special Observer Badge, worn by Soldiers of the HAC or 4/73 Battery RA who have passed STA Patrol Training and successfully completed a probationary period

- 4/73 (Sphinx) Special Observation Post Battery RA
- 5th Regiment Royal Artillery

==== Army Reserve ====
- Honourable Artillery Company
- 204 (Tyneside Scottish) Battery Royal Artillery
- 269 (West Riding) Battery Royal Artillery

=== French Army ===
- 1er régiment d'artillerie
- 35e régiment d'artillerie parachutiste
- 61e régiment d'artillerie

=== German Army ===
- Artillerieaufklärungsbataillon 131, Mühlhausen

=== Italian Army ===
01.09.2004 - today

- Com.F.O.Ter. Comando delle Forze Operative Terrestri (Verona)
  - Co.T.I.E. Comando Trasmissioni ed Informazioni dell'Esercito (Anzio - Caserma "Santa Barbara")
    - Brg.R.I.S.T.A.-I.E.W. Brigata Reconnaissance, Intelligence, Surveillance, Target Acquisition – Intelligence and Electronic Warfare (Anzio - Caserma "Santa Barbara")
      - 41° Rgt.A.Ter.Sor.A.O. Reggimento Artiglieria Terrestre Sorveglianza ed Aquisizione Obiettivi (Casarsa della Delizia - Caserma "Trieste")
        - 2° Gr.Sor.A.O. Gruppo Sorveglianza ed Aquisizione Obiettivi (Sora - Caserma "Simone Simoni")
          - B.A.T. Batteria Aerei Teleguidati
- Com.F.O.Ter. Comando delle Forze Operative Terrestri (Verona)
  - Com.F.O.S.E. Comando delle Forze Speciali dell'Esercito
      - 185° Reggimento Paracadutisti Ricognizione Acquisizione Obiettivi "Folgore"

=== United States Marine Corps ===
- Target Acquisition Platoon (TAP)

== Equipment ==
- Counter-battery radar (CoBRa)
- Mobile Artillery Monitoring Battlefield Asset (MAMBA)
- Advanced Sound-ranging Programme (ASP)
- Unmanned aerial vehicles (UAVs)

== See also ==
- Akashteer
- C4ISTAR
- RSTA (U.S. Army)
- CARVER matrix
