= 27th Regiment Royal Artillery =

27th (Hampshire) Royal Artillery Regiment
- Active: 1 April 1947 – 28 March 1993
- Allegiance: United Kingdom
- Branch: British Army
- Type: Artillery
- Size: Regiment
- Regimental Headquarters: Topcliffe; Last: Ubique Barracks

27 Regiment, Royal Artillery was a field regiment of the Royal Artillery during the Second World War and the Cold War.

== History ==
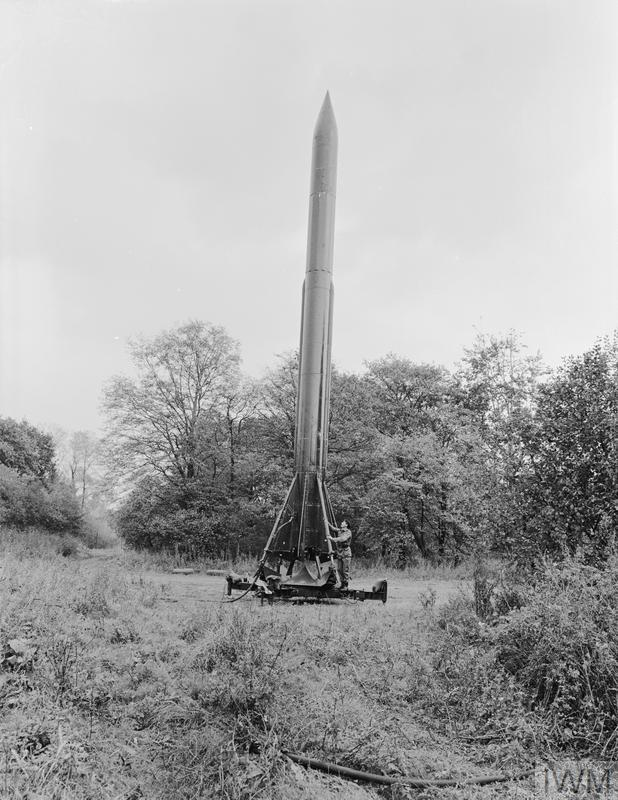
Corporal of the Royal Artillery in West Germany

The regiment saw active service in the Far East during the Second World War. After re-forming at Twycross in 1947, it became 27 (Heavy) Anti-Aircraft Regiment in 1948 and moved to Dortmund as part of 1st Army Group Royal Artillery with Corporal SSM missiles in 1961.

It was renamed 27 (Army Missile) Regiment in 1964 and returned to the UK in October 1967. It then became 27 (Medium) Regiment, Royal Artillery in 1967 and deployed to Lippstadt with M109 as part of 4th Division in 1969. The Regiment then benefited from the first deployment of M110 alongside M109 becoming as part of 2nd Armoured Division. In 1976 the Regiment was restructured and designated 27 Field Regiment.

It moved to Topcliffe as part of 2nd Infantry Brigade in 1986 and returned to Dortmund as part of 3rd Armoured Division in 1990. Finally it returned to the UK and was placed in suspended animation in 1993.

== Nickname ==
The regiment through its history had been known as "The Hampshire Gunners" and recruited mostly from that area. After its suspended animation the name was given to 47 Regiment Royal Artillery.
