= 5th Regiment Royal Artillery =

British Army artillery regiment

5th Regiment Royal Horse Artillery 5th Regiment Royal Artillery
- Active: 25 November 1939 – present
- Allegiance: United Kingdom
- Branch: British Army
- Role: Surveillance and Target Acquisition
- Size: 6 Batteries; 525 personnel
- Part of: 3rd Deep Reconnaissance Strike Brigade
- Garrison/HQ: Catterick Garrison
- Nickname: The Yorkshire Gunners
- Equipment: TAIPAN artillery hunting radar

5th Regiment Royal Artillery is a regiment of the Royal Artillery in the British Army. It was formed in 1939 as 5th Regiment Royal Horse Artillery before being redesignated in 1958. It currently serves in the Surveillance and Target Acquisition role and is equipped with counter-battery radars and acoustic sound ranging equipment; it also provides Special Observation Post teams.

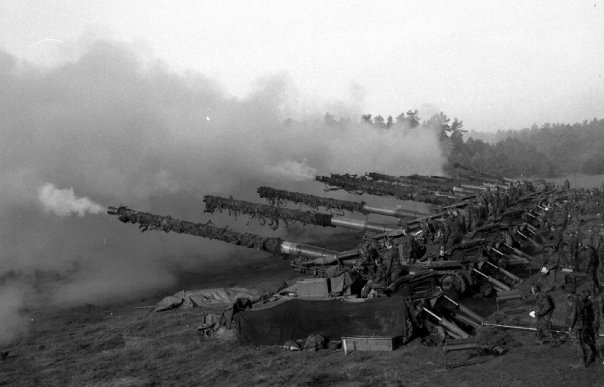
British M107

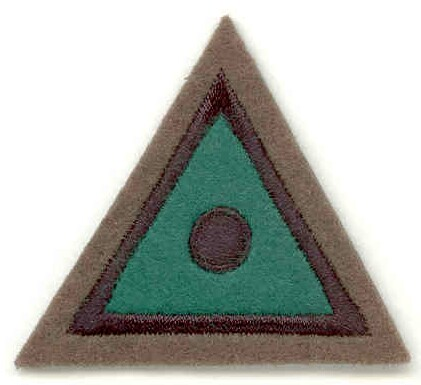
Special Observer Badge, worn by Soldiers who have passed STA Patrol Training

== History ==
=== Formation and Second World War ===
The regiment was formed as 5th Regiment Royal Horse Artillery on 25 November 1939 at Wotton-under-Edge, Gloucestershire and consisted of K Battery (the Riding Troop at St John's Wood) and G Battery (Mercers Troop) (from 4th RHA). CC Battery (Note: From 1 July 1889, RHA batteries were lettered in a single alphabetical sequence in order of seniority from date of formation. When more than 26 batteries were needed, double letters were used, AA, BB, etc.) was formed for the regiment in December 1940.

In 1940, the regiment formed part of the British Expeditionary Force in France. After being evacuated at Dunkirk it joined Home Forces in the United Kingdom before being assigned to the 8th Support Group, 8th Armoured Division. On 8 May 1942, it departed the United Kingdom to take part in the North African campaign. It arrived in Egypt on 18 July – the long sea journey being due to transiting via the Cape of Good Hope. 8th Armoured Division never operated as a complete formation and the regiment served with 23rd Armoured Brigade Group (Defence of the El Alamein Line and the Battle of Alam el Halfa) and 24th Armoured Brigade Group (Battle of El Alamein).

On 1 December 1942, it joined 7th Armoured Division and remained with it for the rest of the war. It took part in the rest of the Western Desert campaign, the Tunisian campaign and, briefly, the Italian campaign (9 September – 15 October 1943). It returned to the United Kingdom in January 1944 to prepare for the invasion of Europe. It fought in the North-West Europe campaign from 8 July 1944 through to the end of the war.

=== Reorganisation ===
Because of the reorganisation of the Royal Horse Artillery in 1958, the regiment became the 5th Field Regiment RA. On 1 February 1958, C Battery moved to 3rd RHA and G Battery (Mercer's Troop) moved to 4th RHA. P Battery (The Dragon Troop) left 4th RHA and Q (Sanna's Post) Battery moved from 10th Field Artillery Regiment on 5 February 1958 to join K Battery and form the regiment. After a short period near Crickhowell, the regiment left the UK in September 1958 for a three-year tour of Hong Kong. After a tour equipped with 25 lb guns, the regiment returned to Salisbury Plain in Southern England in October 1961 as 5 Light Regiment RA.

=== Germany and Northern Ireland ===
During its stay at Perham Down, the regiment had many equipment changes. In 1961, K Battery had 5.5" guns, while P and Q Batteries were equipped with 25-pounders; then, in 1962, all batteries were allotted 4.2" mortars as well as other guns. In 1963, the regiment converted to 105mm Pack Howitzers and took part in exercises in Libya, Canada and Norway with this versatile new gun. In August/September 1964, the regiment moved to the British Army of the Rhine in Germany, reverted to its title of 5th Field Regiment RA, and was stationed in Gutersloh as a Close Support Regiment. Once again K Battery had 5.5" guns and P and Q Batteries 25-pounders, but these later gave way to the Abbot Self Propelled (SP) gun in 1966.

The regiment returned to Southern England in 1969, this time to Bulford.

The next three years at Bulford were dominated by four emergency tours of Northern Ireland. The regiment was mostly operating in the Derry area and had three fatalities from paramilitary actions. At this time, the regiment was equipped with the 105mm pack howitzer (towed by Land Rover) and served in the light airborne role. In 1972, the regiment moved to Hildesheim, Germany and re-equipped with M107 SP 175mm Guns and again changed its name to 5th Heavy Regiment RA. 18 Battery joined the regiment in February 1977 following the disbandment of 42 Regiment RA.

After 12 years at Tofrek Barracks in Hildesheim, the regiment moved to West Riding Barracks in Dortmund in 1984. 18 (Quebec 1759) Battery and Q (Sanna's Post) Battery (which was renamed as 74 Battery (the Battle-Axe Company)) left the regiment to join 32 Heavy Regiment RA. 73 (Sphinx) Locating Battery moved from 94 Locating Regiment to 5th Regiment in January 1985 and was renamed Q (Sanna's Post) Battery. During this period, the Gun Batteries both carried out operational tours of Northern Ireland.

=== The Nineties ===
After Operation Granby, the regiment converted from the M107 SP Gun to the M270 Multiple Launch Rocket System (MLRS). On 1 April 1993, 73 (Sphinx) OP Battery became 4/73 (Sphinx) Special OP Battery.

In late 1993, the regiment carried out a Regimental Arms Plot from Dortmund to Catterick in North Yorkshire. After nearly nine months of unsettled transit period working in Towthorpe Lines, Strensall, near York, the regiment moved into the former RAF Catterick Barracks, now renamed Marne Barracks.

In October 1994, the regiment redeployed to Northern Ireland; this time to South Armagh as the Drumadd Roulement Battalion (DRB).

On 10 June 1997, the regiment, less 4/73 Battery, deployed to Cyprus on Operation TOSCA.

=== Iraq and Afghanistan ===
Both K Battery and 4/73 Battery were involved in the 2003 invasion of Iraq and 1 Battery was deployed to Afghanistan for Operation Herrick 4.

In 2009, the regiment became a Surveillance and Target Acquisition (STA) regiment and re-equipped with radar equipment.

In 2016, the Ministry of Defence stated that the regiment would utilise the Bulldog armoured vehicle instead of the previously used Warthog vehicle on operations.

=== Recent ===
On 28 June 2024, the regiment received five ARTHUR Mod D artillery hunting radars, designated TAIPAN by the British Army, to replace the last generation MAMBA radar for precise artillery-hunting/counter-battery operations, locating an increased number of targets at greater range (up to 100km), with the ability to cover an arc of 120°, with reduced electronic warfare signatures from leveraging Saab’s Digital Antenna technology.

== Current sub-units ==
The batteries are as follows:

- K (Hondeghem) Battery Royal Artillery — Surveillance & Target Acquisition battery, formed in 1809
- P Battery (The Dragon Troop) Royal Artillery — Surveillance & Target Acquisition battery, formed in 1805
- Q (Sanna's Post) Battery Royal Artillery — Headquarters battery, formed in 1824
- 53 (Louisburg) Battery Royal Artillery — Air Assault Surveillance & Target Acquisition battery, formed in 1740
- 93 (Le Cateau) Battery Royal Artillery — Surveillance & Target Acquisition battery, formed in 1803
- 4/73 (Sphinx) Special Observation Post Battery Royal Artillery formed in 1982
- REME Workshop

== See also ==
- List of Royal Artillery batteries

== Bibliography ==
- Clarke, W.G. (1993). Horse Gunners: The Royal Horse Artillery, 200 Years of Panache and Professionalism. Woolwich: The Royal Artillery Institution. ISBN 09520762-0-9.
- Frederick, J.B.M. (1984). Lineage Book of British Land Forces 1660-1978. Wakefield, Yorkshire: Microform Academic Publishers. ISBN 1-85117-009-X.
- Joslen, Lt-Col H.F. (1990) [1st. Pub. HMSO:1960]. Orders of Battle, Second World War, 1939–1945. London: London Stamp Exchange. ISBN 0-948130-03-2.
