= Coalition combat operations in Afghanistan in 2008 =

Part of the War in Afghanistan (2001–2021)

United States and NATO International Security Assistance Force (ISAF) operations, alongside Afghan National Army forces, continued against the Taliban through 2008.

On April 27, President Karzai escaped another attempt on his life: gunmen opened fire during a military parade celebrating the nation's victory and liberation from the eight-year occupation of the Soviet Union. The firefight lasted about a quarter of an hour, with 3 dead and over 10 wounded.

As of September 11, 2008 has been the deadliest year for US forces since the start of the war with 113 deaths. Early September also marked the first time the war spilled over on to Pakistani territory. The year was also the deadliest for several European countries in Afghanistan.

There were two "coalitions" in Afghanistan in 2008, one with a strict basis in international law.

The "NATO-led coalition", identified by the press, referred to the International Security Assistance Force (ISAF) organised by NATO, with a specific United Nations Security Council mandate within Afghanistan, including most of the US forces in Afghanistan, NATO contingents and some non-NATO forces.

The "US-led coalition", identified by the press, referred to Operation Enduring Freedom forces, mostly special forces and air forces, within a strictly U.S. Department of Defense chain of command. The United States claimed the right to conduct these operations by asserting Article 51, self defence, of the United Nations Charter.

== Events in May ==
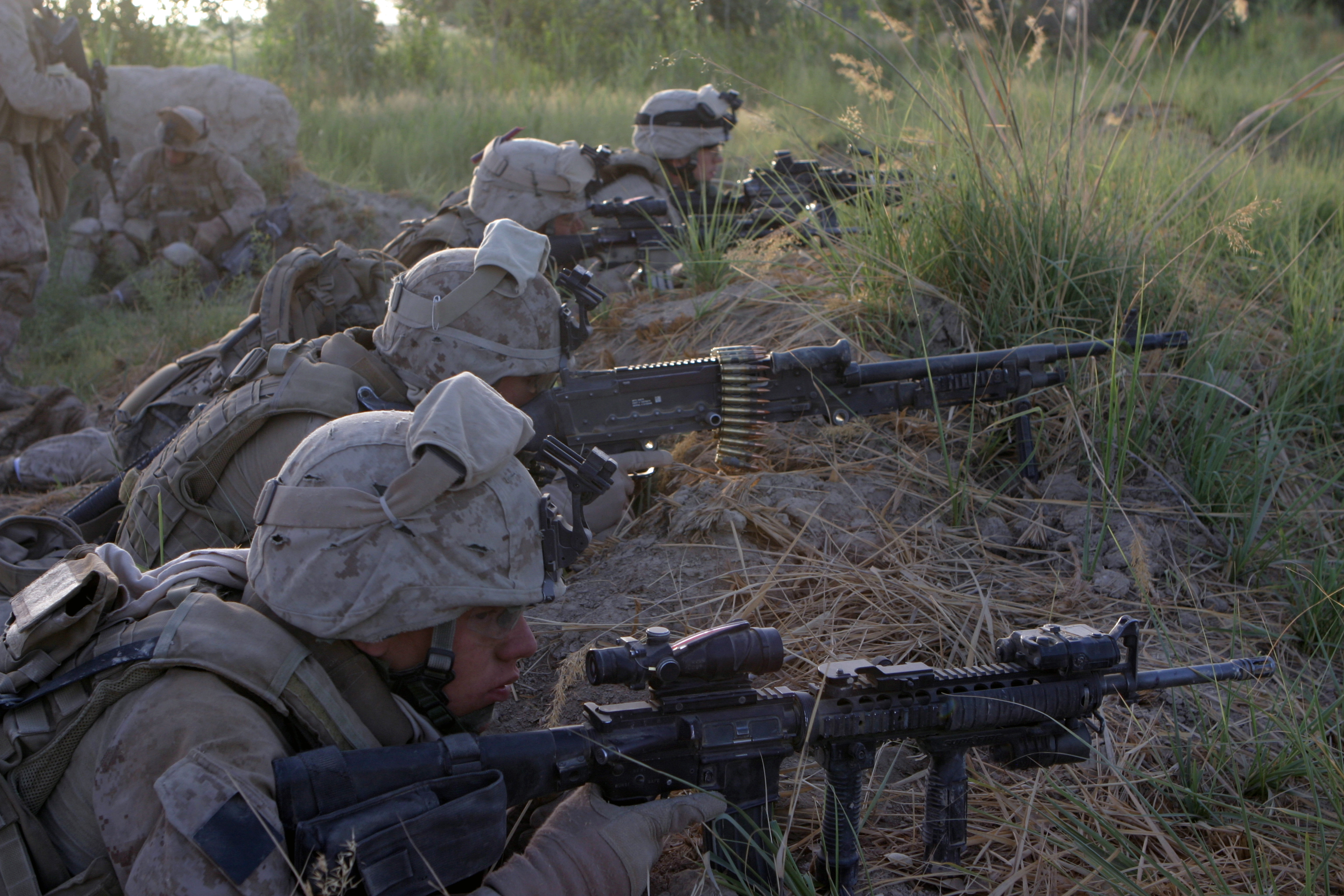
U.S. Marines in Garmsir.

By the end of December 2007, the situation on the ground in Helmand province reached a stalemate. A de facto border was established east of Garmsir along the banks of the Helmand River that divided British-held from Taliban-held territory. The British were outnumbered by the larger Taliban force which was receiving reinforcements from Pakistan. However the British had jets and heavy artillery on their side. Both forces were fighting in the coming months for mere yards of territory.

In early April 2008, U.S. Marine reinforcements were sent to NATO forces in Helmand to help in the fight. After all of the troops arrived, Marines from the 24th Marine Expeditionary Unit (MEU) started their operations with an attack on the Taliban-held town of Garmsir on April 29. The operation was in conjunction with British troops of the 16 Air Assault Brigade. They met almost no resistance, because the Taliban had already observed in the previous days the movements of the Marines before the operation and expected an assault so withdrew to take up positions a few kilometers outside the town. For the next few days there was no contact between the US Marines and the Taliban. But, on May 1, a Marine patrol tried to push further outside of the town and almost immediately were met with machine gun and rocket fire. The unit was pinned down against a dirt berm for several hours. Soon Marine and Taliban forces exchanged mortar fire. At the end of the day, no Marines were hurt or wounded. The Taliban casualty count was not known.

Fighting in Afghanistan was not limited to the south. In May, Norwegian and German led ISAF forces, alongside Afghan National Army troops, conducted Operation Karez, a military operation in Badghis province in the north of Afghanistan. It was the second time in half a year that Norwegian and German ISAF forces had participated in an offensive in Badghis province. Their objective was to eliminate the presence of Taliban insurgents who had regrouped in the area in the aftermath of Operation Harekate Yolo in late 2007. On May 23 the ISAF-led operations concluded on with no casualties among the ISAF soldiers nor the Afghan security forces. The given numbers of Taliban insurgent casualties in the operation vary, but were estimated between 13 and 15 killed in action.

== Events in June ==
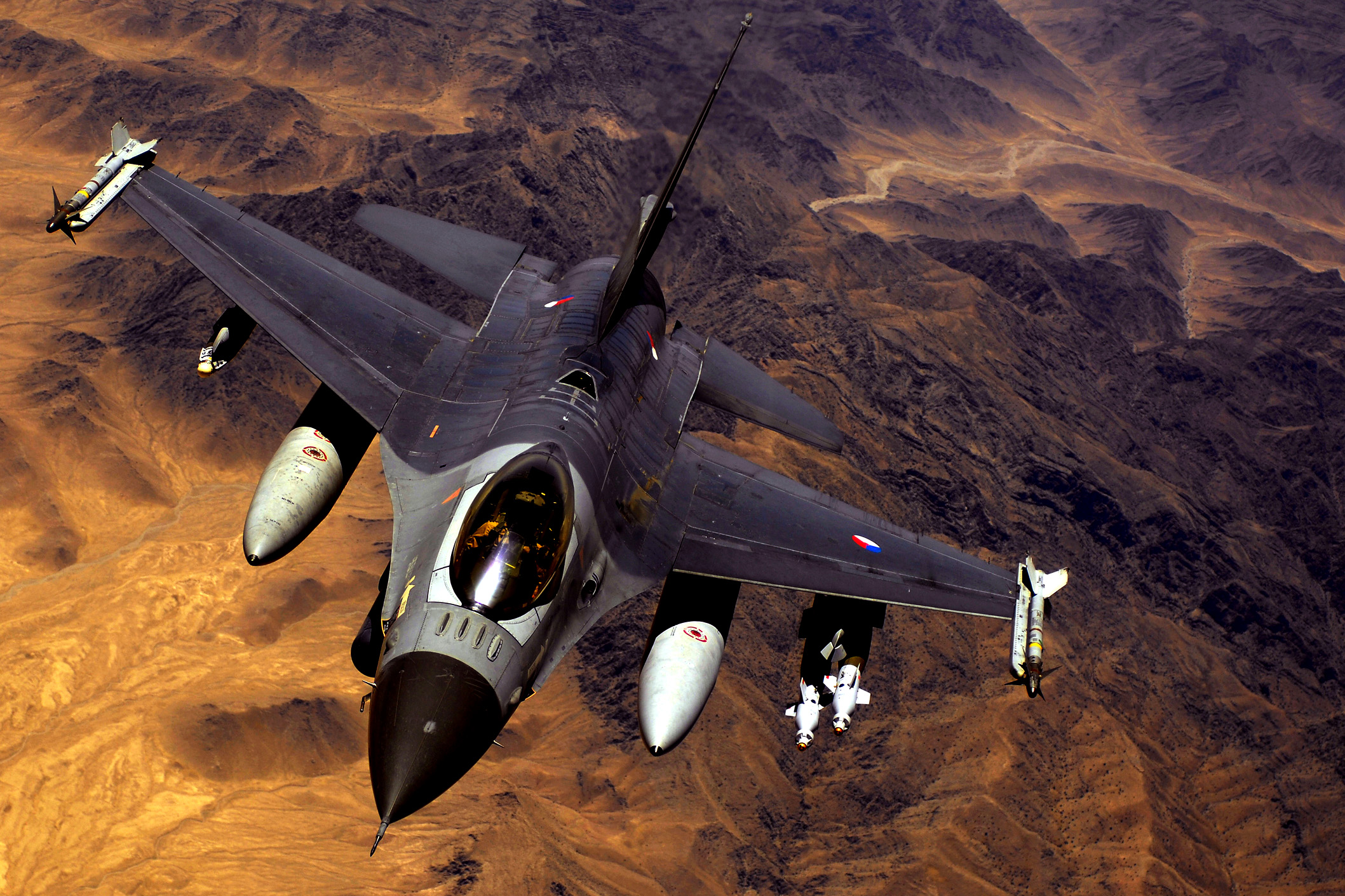
A Royal Netherlands Air Force F-16 Fighting Falcon aircraft conducts a mission over Afghanistan, May 28, 2008, after receiving fuel from a KC-135R Stratotanker aircraft.

In June 2008, British prime minister Gordon Brown announced the number of British troops serving in Afghanistan would increase to 8,030 - A rise of 230 personnel. The same month, however, the UK lost its 100th serviceman killed in the war since 2001, reflecting the nature of the ferocious fighting in Helmand.

On June 13, Taliban fighters demonstrated their ongoing strength, liberating all prisoners in an attack on Sarposa Prison, Kandahar. The well-planned operation freed 1200 prisoners, 400 of whom were Taliban prisoners-of-war, causing a major embarrassment for NATO in one of its operational centres in the country.

On June 19, NATO and Afghan troops responded to the Kandahar jail break by launching an anti-Taliban operation in order to drive out the Taliban insurgents who had seized Arghandab, Afghanistan, an agricultural valley just north of Kandahar. BBC news reports that troops backed by helicopter gunships patrolled areas west of the Arghandab River and that people living in Arghandab District fled the area "fearing fighting between troops and militants".

It was reported that a British helicopter killed a key Taliban leader called 'Sadiqullah' and up to ten members of his cell on 26 June 2008. They were said to be responsible for roadside bomb and suicide attacks against NATO and Afghan forces. The attack took place 10 kilometres north west of Kajaki in Helmand.

== Battle of Wanat ==
On July 13, 2008, a coordinated Taliban attack was launched on a remote NATO base at Wanat in the Kunar province. Approximately 200 militants began firing rockets and mortars from the nearby village, taking American ISAF forces by surprise. After causing serious damage to the integrity of the fortification, insurgents unsuccessfully attempted to storm the base. Although the militants briefly gained entry to a small forward observation post, the overall attack was repelled. In total 9 US and 4 Afghan National Army were killed, along with as many as 40 insurgents. 19 Americans and 4 Afghans were wounded, as well as 20-40 insurgents. The attack showed a step up in bold maneuvers on the part of the insurgency which usually fights on the defensive, following a bold prison assault in June. The US said 40 other militants were killed in Helmand province in separate operations. NATO forces announced that they have abandoned their outpost in the village.

== Increased French involvement in Afghanistan ==
France deployed combat aircraft in 2007 and 2008 (Rafale F2, Mirage 2000D and Super Etendards) and these aircraft saw increased action over Afghanistan. In August, French troops had been involved in increased fighting in the area of Sirobi some 50 km (31 mi) east of Kabul. France recently took over control of the Kabul regional command from the Italians, which includes Sirobi. Ten French troops were killed and a further 21 wounded in an ambush - the heaviest loss of troops France has suffered since deploying to Afghanistan in 2002 and the biggest single loss in 25 years. Taliban losses were unknown, possibly between 13-40 killed and 30 wounded (French and Afghan claims).

Later in the month, an airstrike which targeted a Taliban commander in Herat province killed 90 civilians.

== Operation Eagle's Summit ==
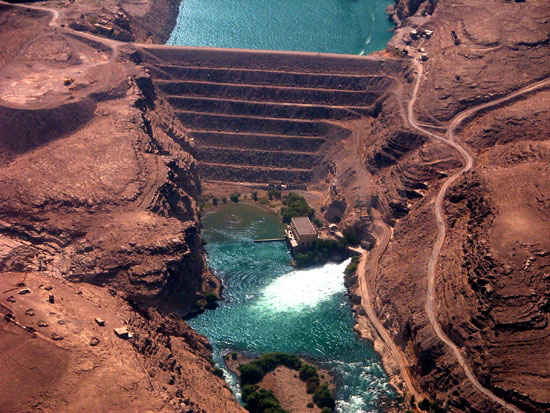
Kajaki Dam.

Late August saw one of the largest operations by NATO forces in Helmand province, with the aim bringing electricity to the region. A convoy of 100 vehicles took five days to move massive sections of an electric turbine for the Kajaki Dam, covering 180 km (110 mi). The operation involved 2,000 British troops, 1,000 other NATO troops from Australia, Canada, Denmark and the US and 1,000 Afghan soldiers. The Canadians covered the first leg and the British took over at a meeting point in the desert, using 50 BVS10 Viking armoured vehicles to escort the convoy. Hundreds of special forces troops went in first, sweeping the area and although difficult to verify, British commanders estimated more than 200 insurgents were killed- without any losses or injuries to NATO soldiers. British, Dutch, French and US aircraft, helicopters and unmanned drones provided aerial reconnaissance and fire support.

== Events in September ==
On September 3, The war spilled over on to Pakistani territory for the first time when heavily armed commandos, believed to be US Army Special Forces, landed by helicopter and attacked three houses in a village close to a known Taliban and al-Qaida stronghold. The attack killed between seven and twenty people. According to local residents, most of the dead were civilians. Pakistan responded furiously, condemning the attack. The foreign ministry in Islamabad called the incursion "a gross violation of Pakistan's territory" and a "grave provocation" which, it said, had resulted in "immense" loss of civilian life. US-led and NATO forces said they had no reports of any troop incursion.

On September 6, in an apparent reaction to the recent cross-border attack, the federal government announced disconnection of supply lines to the allied forces stationed in Afghanistan through Pakistan for an indefinite period.

On September 11, Militants killed two U.S. troops in the eastern part of the country. This brought the total number of US losses to 113, surpassing the previous years total of 111, making 2008 the deadliest year for American troops in Afghanistan since the start of the war. The year was also the deadliest for several European countries in Afghanistan.

On September 12, five civilians and seven militants were reported to have been killed during a US missile attack in north-west Pakistan, in what was reported by locals to be the 5th such attack in recent days. According to early reports, all of the dead were Taliban, killed by one missile. However, later reports found that missiles hit two buildings, the second in which three women and two children were killed. Military spokesman Maj Murad Khan confirmed the missile attack.

An unnamed senior Pentagon official told the BBC that at some point within the past two months President George W. Bush issued a classified order to authorize US raids against militants in Pakistan. Pakistan however said it would not allow foreign forces onto its territory and that it would vigorously protect its sovereignty. According to the Pakistani Chief of Army Staff, Gen Ashfaq Parvez Kayani, there was "no question of any agreement or understanding with the coalition forces whereby they are allowed to conduct operations on our side of the border". The recent cross-border strikes alarmed Pakistani military and government officials, who said it seriously undermined their counter-insurgency operations.

On September 25 a five-minute skirmish called Lowara Madi incident broke out between Pakistani and US forces on the Afghan-Pakistan border after Pakistani soldiers fired warning shots near two US helicopters, according to a senior US military official. No one was reported to be injured. The US claims it never crossed the border and Nato said the helicopters came under fire from a Pakistani checkpoint. However, according to an official statement by Pakistan, commanders said troops fired warning shots at the helicopters when they strayed over the Pakistan border. The statement said the US helicopters were "well within Pakistani territory", and that prompted their forces to fire warning shots.

== December ==
- Operation Red Dagger

== Coalition order of battle ==
As of June 2008, ISAF was made up of about 53,000 personnel from 43 different countries, including the United States, Canada, Australia, New Zealand, 39 Asian and European countries, and all 26 NATO partners. Summary of major troop contributions (over 400, 6 October 2008):

ISAF total - 50,700

- United States - 20,600 (total number of US troops in Afghanistan is 48,250 including National Guard.)
- United Kingdom - 8,330
- Germany - 3,310
- Canada - 2,830
- France 2,730
- Italy - 2,350
- Netherlands - 1,770
- Poland - 1,130
- Australia - 1,080
- Spain - 780
- Denmark - 750
- Romania - 730
- Turkey - 800
- Bulgaria - 460
- Belgium - 420
- Norway - 420
- Czech Republic - 415

=== Summary of coalition forces in Afghanistan in 2008 ===
==== Afghan National Army ====
The Afghan National Army consisted of 76,000 troops in May 2008. In 2008 the army had six Corps. Five corps served as regional commands for the ANA: the 201st Corps based in Kabul, the 203rd Corps based in Gardez, the 205th Corps (Afghanistan) based in Kandahar, the 207th Corps in Herat, and the 209th Corps in Mazari Sharif. The final corps was the Afghan National Army Air Corps.

==== Australia ====
Australian forces have been deployed alongside Dutch forces since 2006, the Australian contingent coming under Operation Slipper. Then-Prime Minister John Howard announced plans in April 2007 to deploy 300 special forces to support the Reconstruction Taskforce. In addition to radar crews, logistics and intelligence officers, and security personnel, this would bring the number of Australian forces in Afghanistan up to about 950 in mid-2007 and 1000 by mid-2008.

==== Canada ====
- A Canadian infantry battle group of 2,830 is based at Kandahar, supported by:
  - an engineer field squadron
  - a field artillery battery
  - a squadron of Leopard 2 main battle tanks
  - a tactical unmanned aerial vehicle troop flying the Sperwer tactical unmanned aerial vehicle.
- The Canadian Air Command has the following aircraft based at Kandahar Airfield:
  - eight CH-146 Griffon helicopters
  - six CH-147 Chinook helicopters
  - three CC-130 Hercules cargo planes

==== Denmark ====
Roughly 640 Danish Defence Force personnel are deployed in Afghanistan from the Royal Danish Army. Almost all of them are engaged in the Helmand Province, a part of these located at Camp Bastion, the rest based in the vicinity of the Green Zone, near the town of Gereshk. Approximately 50 soldiers work along with civilian organizations.

Provincial Reconstruction Team (PRT) - Around 50 Danish soldiers in total are working in PRT teams Mazar E Sharif, Feyzabad and Chaghcharan.

==== France ====
The 2,600 French ground forces in 2008 included troops from the 8th Marine Infantry Parachute Regiment, the 2nd Foreign Parachute Regiment, the Régiment de marche du Tchad and Special Forces from the Commandement des Opérations Spéciales for Special Operations Command, including Navy, marine and air commandos.

French Air Force - Three Rafale F2 and three Mirage 2000D operated from Kandahar International Airport, alongside two KC-135 refueling aircraft which are based in Manas Air Base, Kyrgyzstan. French Naval Super Etendards also deployed in support of ground troops.

==== Netherlands ====
The Netherlands troop deployment in Afghanistan in 2008 averaged at 1,600, mostly based in Uruzgan province at southern Afghanistan. PzH 2000 self-propelled artillery pieces were also deployed and used in combat for the first time. One reinforced company group from A (Kings') company of 11 Grenadier & Ranger Guards Battalion of the 11th Air Assault Brigade served as the regional command South's reserve unit /QRF.

The Royal Netherlands Air Force support consisted of six F-16 close-air-support aircraft (stationed at Kandahar Air Field), three Chinook transport helicopters of 298 Squadron stationed at Kandahar Airfield and six AH-64 attack helicopters of 301 Squadron at Camp Holland in Tarin Kowt.

==== Norway ====
The Norwegian forces in Afghanistan consisted of one mechanized company and one support squadron from the

- Telemark Bataljon, all serving with ISAF forces in northern Afghanistan.

Also special forces from the

- Forsvarets Spesialkommando.
- Hærens Jegerkommando,
- Marinejegerkommandoen,
- Kystjegerkommandoen

and also

- Royal Norwegian Airforce.

==== United Kingdom ====
8,530 British forces operate under 'Operation Herrick'.

Operation Herrick VII (October 2007-April 2008)

- HQ 52 Infantry Brigade
  - The Household Cavalry Regiment - 1 sqn
  - 40 Commando, Royal Marines
  - 1st Battalion, Coldstream Guards
  - 2nd Battalion, The Yorkshire Regiment (14th/15th, 19th and 33rd/76th Foot) (Green Howards)
  - 1st Battalion, The Royal Gurkha Rifles
  - 4th Regiment Royal Artillery
  - 32nd Regiment Royal Artillery - 1 bty of UAVs
  - 39th Regiment Royal Artillery - 1 Troop of MLRS
  - 36 Regiment, Royal Engineers

Operation Herrick VIII (April–October 2008)

- HQ 16 Air Assault Brigade
  - The Household Cavalry Regiment - 1 sqn
  - The Royal Highland Fusiliers, 2nd Battalion The Royal Regiment of Scotland
  - The Argyll and Sutherland Highlanders, 5th Battalion The Royal Regiment of Scotland
  - 1st Battalion, The Royal Irish Regiment (27th (Inniskilling), 83rd, 87th and Ulster Defence Regiment)
  - 2nd Battalion, The Parachute Regiment
  - 3rd Battalion, The Parachute Regiment
  - 7th (Parachute) Regiment Royal Horse Artillery
  - 32nd Regiment Royal Artillery - 1 bty of UAVs
  - 39th Regiment Royal Artillery - 1 Troop of MLRS
  - 23 (Air Assault) Regiment, Royal Engineers

Operation Herrick IX (October 2008-April 2009)

- HQ 3 Commando Brigade
  - 1st The Queen's Dragoon Guards - 1 sqn
  - 42 Commando, Royal Marines
  - 45 Commando, Royal Marines
  - 1st Battalion, The Rifles
  - 2nd Battalion, The Royal Gurkha Rifles
  - 29th Commando Regiment Royal Artillery
  - 32nd Regiment Royal Artillery - 1 bty of UAVs
  - 39th Regiment Royal Artillery - 1 Troop of MLRS
  - 24 (Commando) Regiment, Royal Engineers
  - Commando Logistic Regiment, Royal Marines

The air component of British forces assigned to Operation Herrick is based at Kandahar and comes under the overall command of 904 Expeditionary Air Wing.

- Joint Force Harrier - eleven Harrier GR9 aircraft are stationed at Kandahar tasked with providing close air support to British, Coalition and ISAF ground forces.
- Hercules detachment - Five C-130 Hercules transport aircraft from RAF Lyneham are also stationed at Kandahar to provide troop and supply movement capability in Helmand and wider Afghanistan.
- No 1310 Flight - The support helicopter force consists of 8 Chinook HC2 helicopters.
- RAF Regiment - A field squadron for airfield defence

==== United States ====
The United States had 32,500 military personnel (of which 23,550 were with ISAF) in Afghanistan in 2008.

- The 3rd Brigade Combat Team, 1st Infantry Division relieved the 173rd Airborne Brigade in July 2008. The deployment includes roughly 3,500 soldiers and continues the current U.S. commitment to providing two brigade combat teams in support of Regional Command East.
- The headquarters of the 101st Airborne Division relieved the 82nd Airborne Division's headquarters on April 10, 2008. Consisting of roughly 1,000 soldiers the 101st's headquarters officially became Combined Joint Task Force 101 and now commands NATO's Regional Command East sector in Afghanistan.
- The 101st Sustainment Brigade, 101st Airborne Division, had 2,500 soldiers and deployed with the 101st Headquarters. The brigade includes the following units:
- 4th Brigade Combat Team, 101st Airborne Division
- The 4th Brigade, also known as the 506th Regimental Combat Team, deployed to Afghanistan in April 2008 and relieved the 4th Brigade Combat Team, 82nd Airborne Division.
- The 27th Infantry Brigade Combat Team New York Army National Guard was the headquarters of Task Force Phoenix, which was in charge of training the Afghan National Army. The 27th deployed in the spring of 2008 and was relieved in late 2008 by the 33rd BCT.
- Approximately 2,200 members from the 24th Marine Expeditionary Unit deployed in the spring of 2008 under ISAF command.
- Along with the 24th MEU, the 2nd Battalion 7th Marines deployed to assist in the training and development of Afghan National Security Forces as part of Operation Enduring Freedom.
- The 101st Combat Aviation Brigade relieved the 82nd Combat Aviation Brigade in January 2008. Based at Bagram Air Field, the 101st CAB was responsible for operations in the area including convoy security, medical evacuations and the use of air assets in support of ground forces.

== See also ==
- Timeline of the War in Afghanistan (2001–2021)
- Coalition combat operations in Afghanistan in 2006
- Coalition combat operations in Afghanistan in 2007
- Afghanistan War order of battle
- Civilian casualties in the war in Afghanistan (2001–2021)
- Coalition casualties in Afghanistan
- Protests against the invasion of Afghanistan
- Participants in Operation Enduring Freedom
- War in Afghanistan (2001–2021)
