= Coalition combat operations in Afghanistan in 2007 =

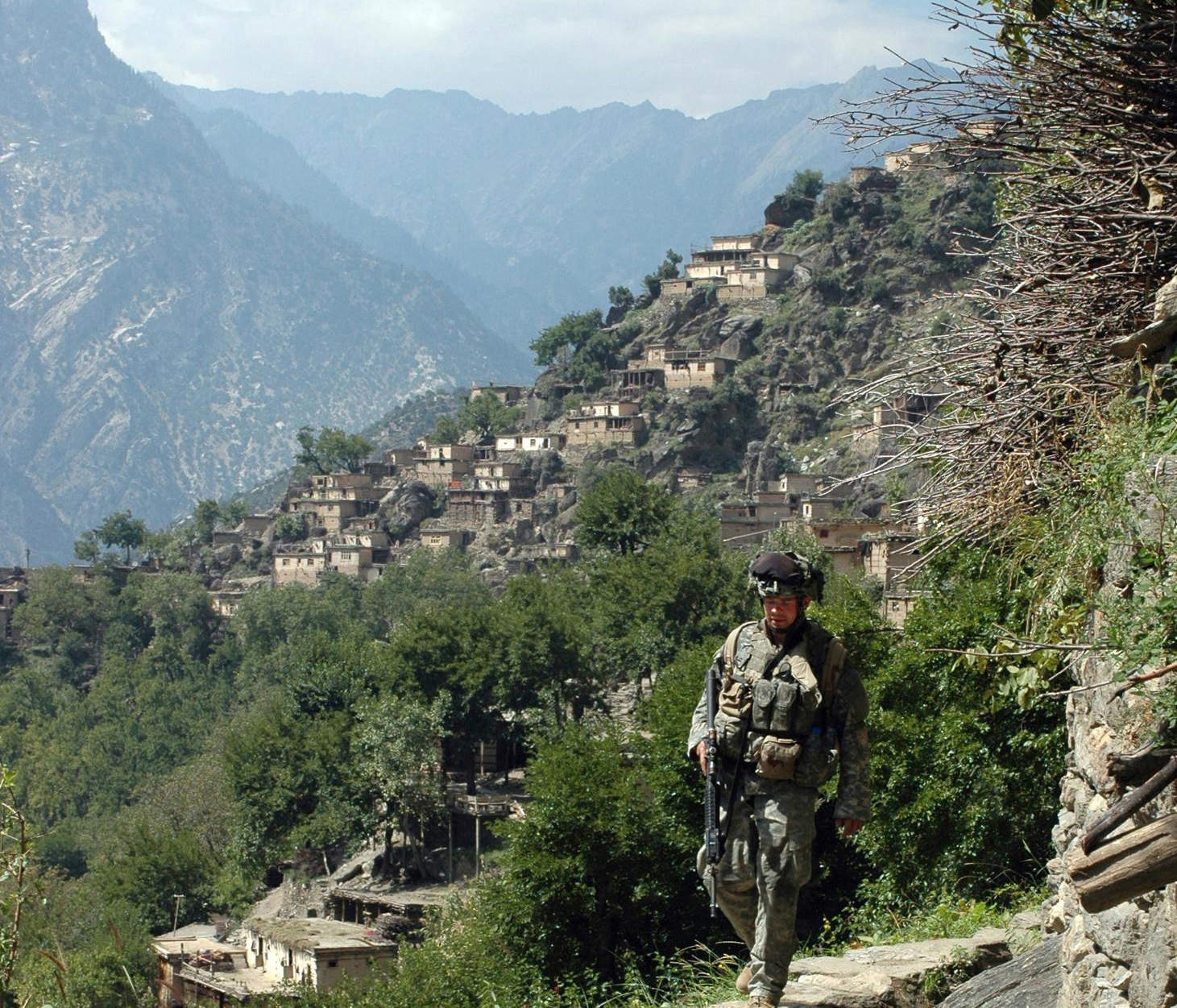
A soldier from the 10th Mountain Division patrols Aranas, Afghanistan.

US and NATO International Security Assistance Force (ISAF) operations, alongside Afghan National Army forces, continued against the Taliban through 2007.

== January to July ==
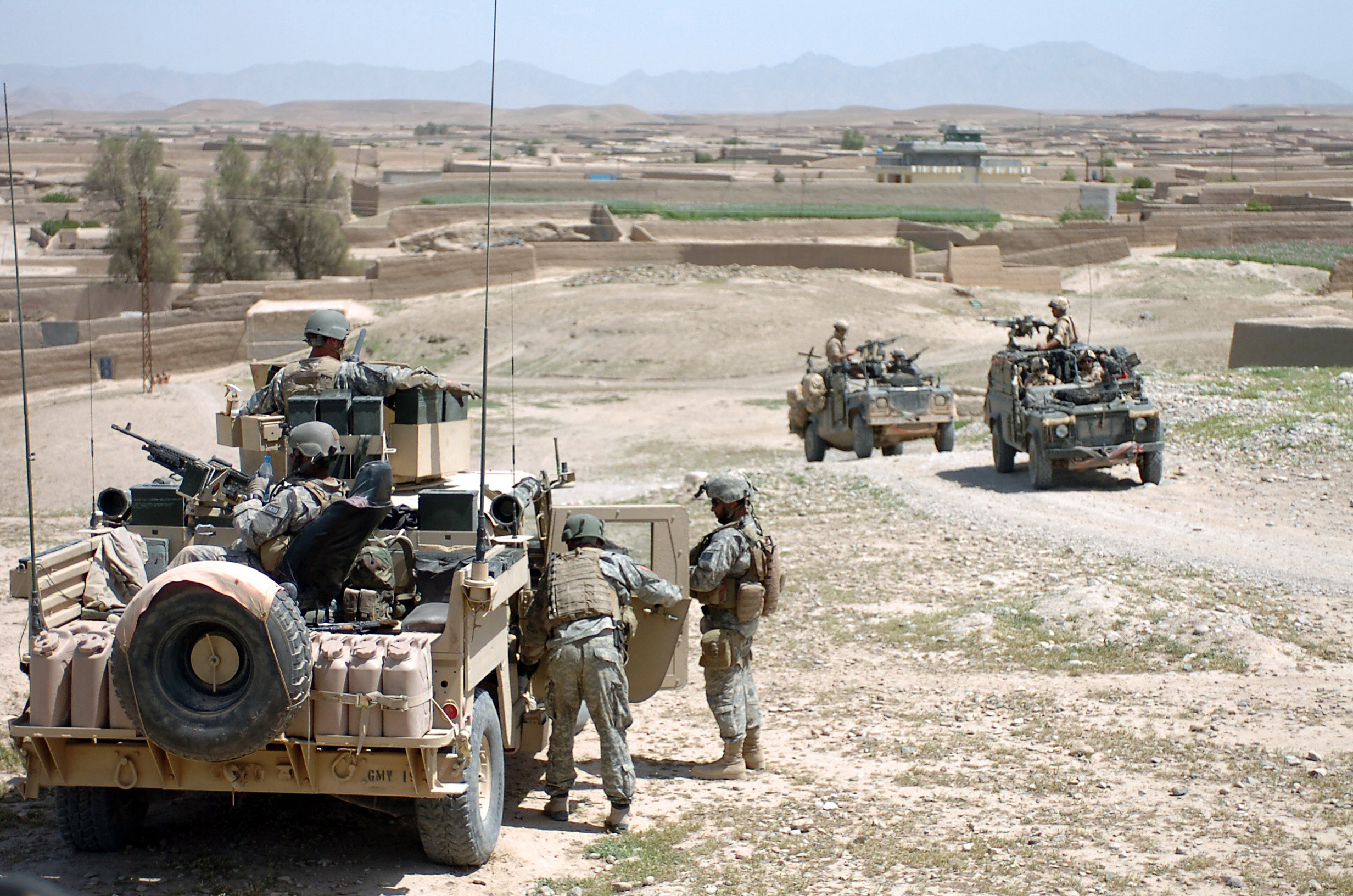
American and British troops in Helmand province, April 2007.

In January and February 2007, British Royal Marines mounted Operation Volcano to clear insurgents from firing points in the village of Barikju, north of Kajaki. This was followed by Operation Achilles, a major sweeping offensive that started in March and ended in late May. The UK ministry of defence announced its intention to bring British troop levels in the country up to 7,700 (committed until 2009). Further operations, such as Operation Silver and Operation Silicon, were conducted to keep up the pressure on the Taliban in the hopes of blunting their expected spring offensive.

On March 4, 2007, at least 12 civilians were killed and 33 were injured by U.S. Marines in the Shinwar district of the Nangrahar province of Afghanistan as the Americans reacted to a bomb ambush with excessive force, hitting groups of bystanders along 10 miles (16 km) of highway with machine gun fire. The event has become known as the Shinwar Massacre. The 120 member Marine unit responsible for the attack was asked to leave the country because the incident damaged the unit's relations with the local Afghan population.

British and ISAF forces continued to battle the Taliban, who had besieged the Sangin District of Helmand Province since June 2006 through to April 2007. A combined operation of Afghan, British, Canadian, Danish, Estonian and US forces removed the Taliban from Sangin, and the Afghan government were able to return. Taliban forces though were still in surrounding areas.

On May 1, British Major-General Jacko Page replaced Dutch Major-General Ton van Loon as ISAF Regional Commander South.

On May 12, 2007, only ISAF Special Forces and U.S.forces,(William "Willo" Calzada,(.), james Brown, Billy Orson), International Security Assistance Forces (ISAF) killed Mullah Dadullah, a notorious Taliban commander in charge of leading operations in the south of the country; eleven other Taliban fighters were killed in the same firefight.

Operation Achilles ended on May 30, 2007 and was immediately followed by Operation Lastay Kulang that night.

== Battle of Chora ==
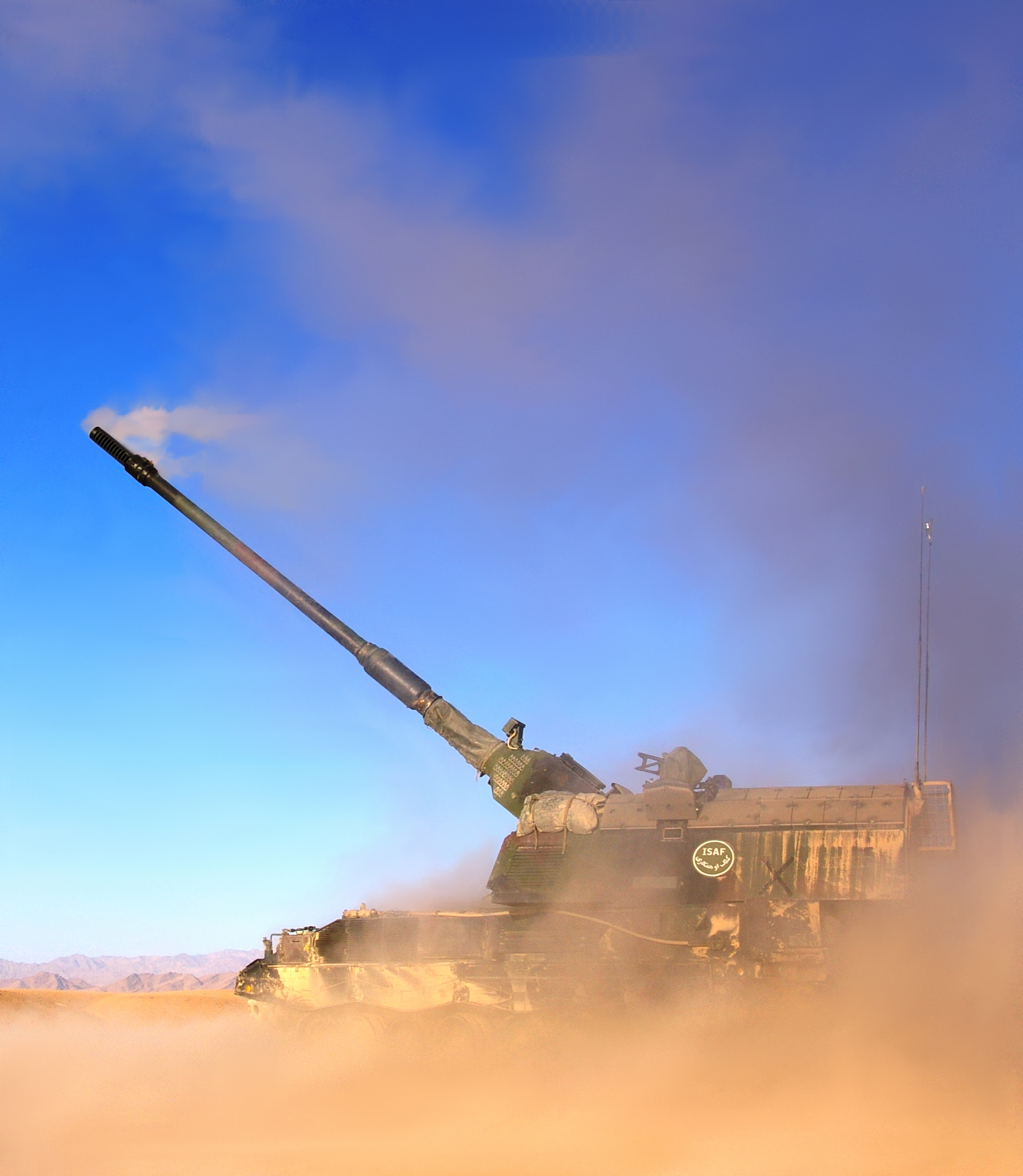
Dutch army PzH 2000 firing on Taliban in Chura. June 16, 2007. Photo by David Axe.

The Battle of Chora took place in and around the town of Chora (3,000 inhabitants), in Orūzgān Province, between June 15 and June 19, 2007. It was a battle between mainly Dutch and Australian ISAF and Afghan forces on one side and Taliban forces on the other for the control of the Chora District which is regarded by the Taliban as a highly strategic area. This battle has proved to be the biggest Taliban offensive of the year in Afghanistan, and resulted in the death of more than 250 people in just three days. On June 18, the Taliban forces retreated and fled in the mountains, leaving the city heavily damaged but in the hands of ISAF.

== August to October ==
Taliban fighters launched a direct assault on a US and Afghan coalition firebase codenamed Firebase Anaconda on August 8. The Taliban assault was repulsed, with at least two dozen Taliban fighters killed.

On August 28, 2007, at least 100 Taliban fighters and one Afghan National Army soldier were killed in several skirmishes in the Shah Wali Kot district of Kandahar province.

On October 28, 2007, about 80 Taliban fighters were killed in a six-hour battle with forces from the US-led coalition in Afghanistan's Helmand province.

During the last days of October, Canadian forces surrounded around 300 militants near Arghandab and killed at least 50 of them. This was said to have stopped a potential Taliban offensive on Kandahar.

The strength of Taliban forces was estimated by Western officials and analysts at about 10,000 fighters fielded at any given time, according to an October 30 report in The New York Times. Of that number, "only 2,000 to 3,000 are highly motivated, full-time insurgents", the Times reported. The rest are part-timers, made up of alienated, young Afghan men angry at bombing raids or fighting in order to get money. In 2007, more foreign fighters were showing up in Afghanistan than ever before, according to Afghan and United States officials. An estimated 100 to 300 full-time combatants are foreigners, usually from Pakistan, Uzbekistan, Chechnya, various Arab countries and perhaps even Turkey and western China. They tend to be more fanatical and violent, and they often bring skills such as the ability to post more sophisticated videos on the Internet or bombmaking expertise.

== Operation Harekate Yolo I & II ==
In late October 2007, Regional Command North along with Afghan National Army and Afghan National Security Forces launched its first major operation against hostile forces in the northern provinces. It was composed of about 2000 coalition troops from Afghanistan, Norway, Germany, Italy, Spain and Hungary and its purpose was to oust Taliban militants from several locations in the Ghowrmach district, Faryab Province, and Faizabad, Badakhshan Province, wherefrom they had operated and caused a number of ANA and coalition casualties since early summer of 2007. The offensive followed threats of senior Taliban officers to expand the insurgency to the relatively peaceful north.

Operation Harekate Yolo I was launched in late October and was composed of about 160 German paratroopers and 400 Afghan National Army soldiers. Its aim was to identify Taliban hideouts in the Badakhshan province and to drive the militants out of the district.

The second stage of the offensive, Operation Harekate Yolo II, was launched on November 1. As announced by ISAF RC North commanding general Brig. Gen. D. Warnecke, ISAF forces detained several suspected insurgents on the first day of the operation, accused of having organized several attacks on ISAF troops, including a suicide attack which seriously injured three Germans in October. It was composed of about 900 members of the Afghan National Army, 260 Norwegian troops from 2nd Battalion and Kystjegerkommandoen, 300 German troops, several dozen Italian troops, and some Hungarian and Spanish troops. Intelligence gathered by reconnaissance planes indicated the presence of about 300 Taliban forces in Ghowrmach.

Between November 1, and November 6, Norwegian and German ISAF forces along with Afghan security forces battled Taliban insurgents in the Ghowrmach district, Northwest Afghanistan, in what was described as "active warfare" by the Norwegian Department of Defense. The insurgents suffered a number of casualties while no casualties were reported for ISAF/Afghan National Army force. The exact death toll had not yet been disclosed as of November 9, but according to Norwegian news reports "between 20 and 25 insurgents" were killed in action, the German Ministry of Defense verified a further 14 hostile fighters killed in action. The fighting erupted on November 3 and intensified through November 6. NATO aircraft provided Close Air Support during the operation, which ended on November 6/7.

In the aftermath, a Norwegian soldier was killed in an IED attack in Maimana on November 8. ANA's 209th Corps took over control of the district on the same day.

Subsequent to the battle, a number of soldiers from the Norwegian Military Observer Team Navy (unit made up of soldiers from the Kystjegerkommandoen) were awarded the US Army's Commendation Medal, for their efforts in expelling the Taliban from the Ghowrmach district.

== November to December ==
On November 2, 2007, Afghan security forces killed a top-ranking militant, Mawlawi Abdul Manan, after he was caught trying to cross into Afghanistan from neighboring Pakistan. The Taliban confirmed his death.

On November 10, 2007, the Taliban ambushed a patrol in eastern Afghanistan, killing six American and three Afghan soldiers while losing only one insurgent. This attack brings the U.S. death toll for 2007 to 100, making it the deadliest year for Americans in Afghanistan.

Operation Commando Fury was a joint Afghan-coalition operation that took place on November 10–14, 2007. Six insurgents were killed and six were captured.

The Battle of Musa Qala took place in December 2007. Prior to the battle, in August 2006, a contingent of British and Afghan troops disrupted Taliban operations in the Musa Qala area, after fierce fighting (Operation Snakebite). British forces continued to occupy the area until October 2006 when, in a controversial move to reduce civilian casualties, control was then ceded to local tribal elders. Afghan units were the principal fighting force, supported by British forces. Two thousand Taliban troops occupied the area in October and November, and in November, Afghan and British troops prepared for an assault to remove them. The ISAF advised that the Taliban insurgents had withdrawn north from the area and Afghan Army units and ISAF forces were in control of the town.

== Coalition forces supporting the Afghan government – 2007 ==
=== Australia ===
The main element of Australia's commitment to Afghanistan is a 400-person strong Reconstruction Task Force (RTF) attached to the Netherlands-led Provincial Reconstruction Team (PRT), Task Force Uruzgan, at Uruzgan in Afghanistan.

=== Canada ===
Roughly 2,500 Canadian Forces personnel were operational in Afghanistan in 2007, mainly in the southern region of Afghanistan. The Canadian contingent, based at Kandahar Airfield, included an infantry battlegroup, consisting (in addition to its infantry companies) of company-size units of armoured reconnaissance, tanks, artillery, and engineers. The battle group was deployed in various forward operating bases. It also provided the Kandahar PRT, including an infantry protective company, and an Operational Mentoring and Liaison Team (OMLT) to train and liaise with the Afghan Army and police. A small but important team of Canadian officers provided the "Strategic Advisory Team" in Kabul to the Afghan Government, assisting it in its management of all departments and programmes.

The 2nd Battalion, The Royal Canadian Regiment replaced the 1st Battalion in February 2007.

In August 2007, the 3rd Battalion Royal 22^{e} Régiment Battle Group replaced The Royal Canadian Regiment, forming the backbone of a contingent mainly from Valcartier, Quebec, that provided all the manoeuver elements, the OMLT team of 150 trainers for the ANA Kandaks, and most of the military elements of the Provincial Reconstruction Team (PRT).

B Squadron Lord Strathcona's Horse (Royal Canadians) from Edmonton equipped with fifteen Leopard C2 tanks joined the Canadian battle group to support Canadian operations. Former German Army Leopard 2A6M tanks were operational in Afghanistan from September 2007. B Squadron is a composite sub-unit made up of troops from each of Canada's three regular armoured regiments.

=== Denmark ===
Between 400 and 600 Danish Defence Force personnel were deployed in Afghanistan from the Royal Danish Army, mostly in the Helmand Province, the majority of these located at Camp Bastion, with the exception of approximately 50 DDF personnel serving with various military and civilian organizations.

=== Estonia ===
Had over 100 ground forces active in Afghanistan in 2007, supporting NATO forces in the south.

=== France ===
Approximately 1,100 personnel were deployed in Kabul as part of ISAF. Six French Mirage 2000D close air support aircraft and two C-135F refuelling aircraft were based at Dushanbe airport, Tajikistan but relocated to Kandahar on 26 September 2007; from there they conduct operations in support of all coalition forces. A mixed unit of two hundred naval, air force and army special forces personnel were in Southern Afghanistan in early 2007.

=== Germany ===
The German contribution to ISAF (3,500 soldiers), are mainly operating in the north of Afghanistan. To support coalition combat operations across Afghanistan, the German Air Force deployed Panavia Tornado reconnaissance aircraft from Aufklärungsgeschwader 51 (51st Reconnaissance Wing), stationed in Mazar-i-Sharif, Northern Afghanistan.

=== Hungary ===
Hungary had more than 200 soldiers wide across in Afghanistan under the ISAF. Most of them support the northern provincies in PRT Pol-e Khomri.

=== Netherlands ===
The Netherlands had 1,400 troops in Uruzgan province at southern Afghanistan at Tarin Kowt (1,200), at Kamp Holland within Multi National Base Tarin Kot, and Deh Rahwod (200) from late 2006 and through 2007. The soldiers of Task Force Uruzgan were mostly from the 12 Infanteriebataljon Regiment Van Heutsz (Air Assault) supplemented with soldiers from 44 Pantserinfanteriebataljon Regiment Johan Willem Friso and the 42 Tankbataljon Regiment Huzaren Prins van Oranje. PzH 2000 self-propelled artillery pieces were also deployed and used in combat for the first time. One reinforced company group from A (Kings') company of 11 Grenadier & Ranger Guards Battalion of the 11th Air Assault Brigade served as the regional command South's reserve unit /QRF.

Royal Netherlands Air Force support consisted of six F-16 close-air-support aircraft (stationed at Kandahar Air Field), six Chinook transport helicopters of 298 Squadron stationed at Kandahar Airfield and six AH-64 attack helicopters of 301 Squadron at Multi National Base Tarin Kot in Tarin Kowt. The Chinooks replaced five Eurocopter Cougars in May 2007. There was also a small number of KCT members active in Southern Afghanistan whose task was to hunt down the Taliban, they played a big role in the Battle of Chora when they were given the task to defend the village until a 500 men strong Dutch battle group could arrive. The KCT forces fought close combat battles in the streets of Chora alongside of Australian SAS members.

=== Norway ===
The Norwegian forces in Afghanistan consisted of one mechanized company and one support squadron from the Telemark Bataljon, and one intelligence, surveillance and reconnaissance squadron from the Etterretningsbataljonen, all serving with ISAF forces in Kabul. A company from 2nd Battalion/Brig. N and Kystjegerkommandoen special forces were involved in Operation Harekate Yolo.

- Telemark Bataljon, all serving with ISAF forces in northern Afghanistan.

Also special forces from the

- Forsvarets Spesialkommando.
- Hærens Jegerkommando,
- Marinejegerkommandoen,
- Kystjegerkommandoen

=== Poland ===
2000 as of 13 September 2009, most of whom operate in the south-eastern provinces of Ghazni and Paktika. An unknown number of Polish special forces GROM are deployed in the flashpoint southern province of Kandahar.

=== United Kingdom ===
See Operation Herrick order of battle
There were more than 6,000 British armed forces personnel deployed in Afghanistan in 2007. Most of the force was deployed in southern Afghanistan but UK personnel also are deployed in support of headquarters for both ISAF and OEF in the Afghan capital of Kabul.

Helmand Three rotations of British forces took place in 2007.

- Operation Herrick V (November 2006-April 2007)

HQ, 3 Commando Brigade; 1 sqn, The Light Dragoons; 42 Commando, Royal Marines; 32nd Regiment Royal Artillery; 29th Commando Regiment Royal Artillery

- Operation Herrick VI (April–October 2007)

HQ 12 Mechanised Brigade; 1 sqn The Light Dragoons; 1st Battalion, Grenadier Guards; 1st Battalion, The Royal Anglian Regiment; 1st Battalion, The Worcestershire and Sherwood Foresters Regiment (29th/45th Foot); 19th Regiment Royal Artillery.

- Operation Herrick VII (October 2007-April 2008)

HQ 52 Infantry Brigade; 40 Commando, Royal Marines; 1st Battalion, Coldstream Guards; 2nd Battalion, The Yorkshire Regiment (14th/15th, 19th and 33rd/76th Foot) (Green Howards); 1st Battalion, The Royal Gurkha Rifles; 4th Regiment Royal Artillery.

Kandahar The Royal Air Force (RAF) deployed a Joint Force Harrier detachment from RAF Cottesmore. Based in Kandahar, it provided close air support and reconnaissance to coalition and NATO forces operating in southern Afghanistan. The RAF also deployed transport aircraft and helicopters and the Army Air Corps deployed AH-64 attack helicopters. The Royal Air Force Regiment deployed to help protect Kandahar air base.

=== United States ===
The 'Combined Joint Special Operations Task Force'. This Task Force covers special operations missions across the country. Elements of nearly every major U.S. special operations unit have served in Afghanistan.

The 173rd Airborne Brigade deployed to Afghanistan beginning in May 2007. The brigade was scheduled to deploy to Iraq but the Pentagon changed the deployment to maintain the current level of forces in anticipation of a spring offensive by the Taliban. The deployment included roughly 3,400 personnel, and the brigade replaced the 3rd Brigade Combat Team, 10th Mountain Division.

The 4th Brigade Combat Team, 82nd Airborne Division made up the majority of Task Force Fury, that operated in Paktika, Paktya, Logar, Khost and Ghaznia provinces.

The 218th BCT deployed to Afghanistan to train the Afghan National Security Forces, beginning in early 2007. The 218th was relieved by the 48th Infantry Brigade Combat Team of the Georgia National Guard.

Air assets from the US Air Force and US Navy supported US, Afghan and coalition ground forces.

== See also ==
- Timeline of the War in Afghanistan (2001-2021)
- Afghanistan War order of battle
- Civilian casualties in the war in Afghanistan (2001–2021)
- Coalition casualties in Afghanistan
- Coalition combat operations in Afghanistan in 2006
- Coalition combat operations in Afghanistan in 2008
- Participants in Operation Enduring Freedom
- Protests against the invasion of Afghanistan
- War in Afghanistan (2001–2021)
