= 176 (Abu Klea) Battery Royal Artillery =

British Army artillery battery

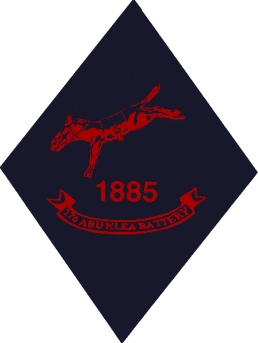
- Active: 1860-present
- Country: United Kingdom
- Branch: Army
- Type: Artillery
- Part of: 26th Regiment Royal Artillery
- Nickname: "The Abus"
- Anniversaries: Abu Klea Day 17 January
- Equipment: MLRS
- Battle honours: Abu Klea

176 (Abu Klea) Battery Royal Artillery is the junior currently-existent regular battery of the Royal Artillery. Its name is pronounced "One Seven Six", and the battery is commonly referred to as "The Abus", and its members as "Abus", after the battery's Honour Title. The battery is one of the sub-units of 26th Regiment Royal Artillery, part of the British Army. It was formed in 1860 and since then has participated in many campaigns, most notably the Battle of Abu Klea in 1885, where Gunner Smith earned a Victoria Cross and later its Honour Title.

== Early history ==
5 Battery, 15 Brigade, Royal Artillery was officially raised in Gosport on 1 May 1860 by Captain J. de Havilland, although in reality it first paraded on the 23rd. It spent the next few years garrisoned variously in Ireland, Woolwich, Halifax, Gibraltar, the Channel Islands and Malta, without being involved in any conflicts.

In 1884, the Nile Expeditionary Force was organised with the purpose of relieving General Gordon and his British forces at Khartoum in the Sudan. Now renamed as part of an RA reorganisation, 1 Battery, Southern Division, Royal Artillery joined the force at Cairo and equipped with the 2.5 inch RML Mountain Gun (the "Screw Gun"), and camels for transport. While the main part of the force headed up the River Nile by steamer, a camel corps of about two thousand men was detached to move directly cross-country, at best speed, bypassing the waterfalls along the Nile. Half of the battery was detached to support this column. On 16 January 1885, a force of approximately 12,000 Mahdists was encountered by the column and engaged on the morning of 17 January in the Battle of Abu Klea.

During the battle, the battery's guns were pushed out to the edge of the British square to fire at the charging enemy. The guns each managed to fire one round of case-shot, cutting down many of the enemy, before they reached the square and engaged in hand-to-hand fighting. Lieutenant D. J. Guthrie was attacked by several Sudanese and was seriously wounded in the leg. One of his soldiers, Gunner Alfred Smith, saved his life by killing his assailant with the handspike from a gun, and remained standing over him fighting off others. For this act of bravery Gunner Smith was awarded the Victoria Cross, although Lieutenant Guthrie was to die of his wounds. Other decorations for the Battery during this action include two Distinguished Conduct Medals and two brevet promotions for the officers present. On 22 June 1955 176 Battery was awarded the Honour Title "Abu Klea" in recognition of its distinguished service in this action.

After service in Egypt and the Sudan the battery was stationed again in Malta, then posted to Hong Kong in 1890, returning to Malta in 1895 and to the United Kingdom 1898. While in the United Kingdom the battery re-roled as 15 Company, Royal Garrison Artillery and was sent to Ireland until the First World War. There are no records within the battery's own archives of its activities during the Great War. Afterwards it spent time as Q Coast Battery manning the coastal defences of the United Kingdom, and as 20th Pack Battery in Hong Kong with 3.7-inch mountain howitzers and still using mules for transport, the last British battery to do so.

== The Second World War ==
At the start of the Second World War, the battery, now renamed 120 Field Battery and part of 32 Regiment, served in France with the British Expeditionary Force and was part of the retreat and evacuation from Dunkirk. Five guns remained under Captain G. R. W. Stainton in a rearguard action to defend the perimeter while the rest of the British force escaped. After returning to the UK, the battery re-equipped with 25-pounders, moved to the Middle East in 1941 and took part in the Anglo-Iraqi War, the Syria–Lebanon Campaign, and then later the North African campaign where it participated in Jock columns. During the British retreat to El Alamein, 32 Regiment were tasked to hold Fuka Aerodrome against overwhelming German forces while the RAF evacuated their aircraft. During this engagement, the regiment, including the linked 115/120 Field Battery, suffered massive casualties. The survivors made their way back to Cairo, where 115/120 was reformed with reinforcements, and went on to take part in Montgomery's successful counteroffensive.

120 Field Battery continued to serve with 25-pounders until the Allied advance reached Tunisia in 1943. Here the battery was re-equipped with 155mm Long Tom howitzers, became 120 Medium Battery and served in Italy, most notably at Monte Cassino in April 1944. The battery later played a part in the final battles in northwest Europe in 1945, and with ironic symmetry was in Dunkirk when the war in Europe ended. It spent some time in the occupation of Germany before returning to the UK.

== Post-war ==
In 1947 120 Field Battery was renamed 176 Field Battery, by which name it is still known today, bar changes in functional designation and the addition of the Honour Title. It was part of 45th Field Regiment RA, itself part of 29th Independent Infantry Brigade which deployed to Korea under UN command after the outbreak of the Korean War. The battery fought in Korea throughout the war, including at the Battle of the Imjin River in support of the Royal Ulster Rifles. The Battery Sergeant Major and a subaltern were decorated for bravery during this action.

176 Battery spent most of the post-war years until 1995, garrisoned in Sennelager, near Paderborn in Germany as part of the BAOR. It had various equipments at different times, including the 25-pounder, which were used on active service in Korea. They returned to UK from Germany in 1962 and were stationed in Shoeburyness, training on the 105mm pack howitzer, prior to joining 28 Commonwealth Brigade stationed in Malacca, Malaya. The 105mm pack howitzer was used between 1963 and 1966 in Malaya and Borneo during the Indonesia-Malaysia confrontation. They returned from Malaya to Shoeburyness to be equipped with the 155 mm howitzer and were subsequently deployed to Dortmund in Germany in 1966, where they were equipped with the nuclear-armed M109 Self Propelled 155mm howitzer. During these decades the battery also completed five emergency tours of Northern Ireland in the internal security role.

The battery last changed role and equipment in 1990 with the adoption of the Multiple Launch Rocket System (MLRS). The MLRS was hurried into service so that 39 Regiment, now 176 Battery's parent unit, could deploy on Operation Granby to use it in support of the Coalition Forces during the Gulf War. The battery therefore has the distinction of being the only battery of the Royal Artillery to have participated in both major UN actions since 1945, namely Korea and the Gulf.

During the remainder of the 1990s, the battery completed two tours with the UN in Cyprus. In 1995 it moved with 39 Regiment permanently back to the UK, and in 1999 completed another tour of Northern Ireland, and in 2006-2007 another in Cyprus.

== Present day ==
176 (Abu Klea) Battery was one of the constituent batteries of 39 Regiment Royal Artillery, which was based in the UK near Newcastle upon Tyne. It is still equipped with MLRS and deployed in-role with its launchers to Afghanistan in 2008 as part of the ongoing conflict. In February 2015, when 39 Regiment Royal Artillery was disbanded, 176 (Abu Klea) Battery moved to join 19 Regiment Royal Artillery and was subsequently moved into 26th Regiment Royal Artillery in preparation for their move to Larkhill in 2019.

== Traditions ==
Abu Klea Day is held on 22 June. This is the anniversary of the awarding of the Honour Title "Abu Klea" in 1955. It is the primary date of celebration for the battery.

The battery's emblem is the kicking mule, in recognition of the important role played by mules in its history. It was reinstated on 22 June 1993, Abu Klea Day.

The battery also celebrates its birthday on 1 May, the anniversary of its foundation in 1860. The other date of significance is 17 January, the anniversary of the Battle of Abu Klea.
