= 3rd Regiment Royal Horse Artillery =

British Army artillery regiment

- Active: 27 August 1938 – present but all the individual batteries except one have served since creation between 1793 & 1811
- Country: United Kingdom
- Branch: British Army
- Role: Deep Fires
- Size: Regiment; 489 personnel
- Part of: 3rd Deep Reconnaissance Strike Brigade
- Garrison/HQ: Albemarle Barracks, Northumberland, England
- Nicknames: The Liverpool & Manchester Gunners
- Equipment: M270 Multiple Launch Rocket System
- Engagements: Second World War Western Desert campaign Tunisian campaign Italian campaign North West Europe campaign
- Battle honours: Ubique

3rd Regiment Royal Horse Artillery is a regiment of the Royal Horse Artillery in the British Army. They are currently based at Albemarle Barracks, Northumberland, England.

The regiment is equipped with MLRS and provides Deep Fires to the 3rd Deep Reconnaissance Strike Brigade, 3rd (UK) Division.

The regiment was constituted in 1939 out of existing batteries. Two of the batteries have served continuously since the 1790s. Two others have served continuously since their formation in the period 1805-1811 during the Napoleonic wars. M Battery, by contrast, had served since 1993.

== History ==
=== Formation ===
The basic organic unit of the Royal Artillery was, and is, the battery. Prior to May 1938, when grouped together they formed brigades, in the same way that infantry battalions or cavalry regiments were grouped together in brigades. At the outbreak of the First World War, a field artillery brigade of headquarters (four officers, 37 other ranks), three batteries (five and 193 each), and a brigade ammunition column (four and 154) had a total strength just under 800 so was broadly comparable to an infantry battalion (just over 1,000) or a cavalry regiment (about 550). Like an infantry battalion, an artillery brigade was usually commanded by a Lieutenant-Colonel. After May 1938, brigades were redesignated as regiments and on 27 August 1938, III Brigade Royal Horse Artillery at Abbassia, Egypt was redesignated as 3rd Regiment Royal Horse Artillery.

Also in 1938, artillery brigades were reorganized from three six-gun batteries to two 12-gun batteries. (Note: The experience of the BEF in 1940 showed the problem with this organisation: field artillery regiments were intended to support an infantry or armoured brigade of three battalions or regiments. This could not be managed without severe disruption to the regiment. As a result, field artillery regiments were reorganised into three 8-gun batteries.) Rather than disband existing batteries, they were instead linked in pairs. As a result, D and J Batteries formed D/J Battery on 11 May 1938 and M and P Batteries were linked as M/P Battery on the same date. This was the regiment's structure on formation but in the event the batteries were unlinked within months (in September 1939) and the regiment operated with four batteries.

=== Second World War ===
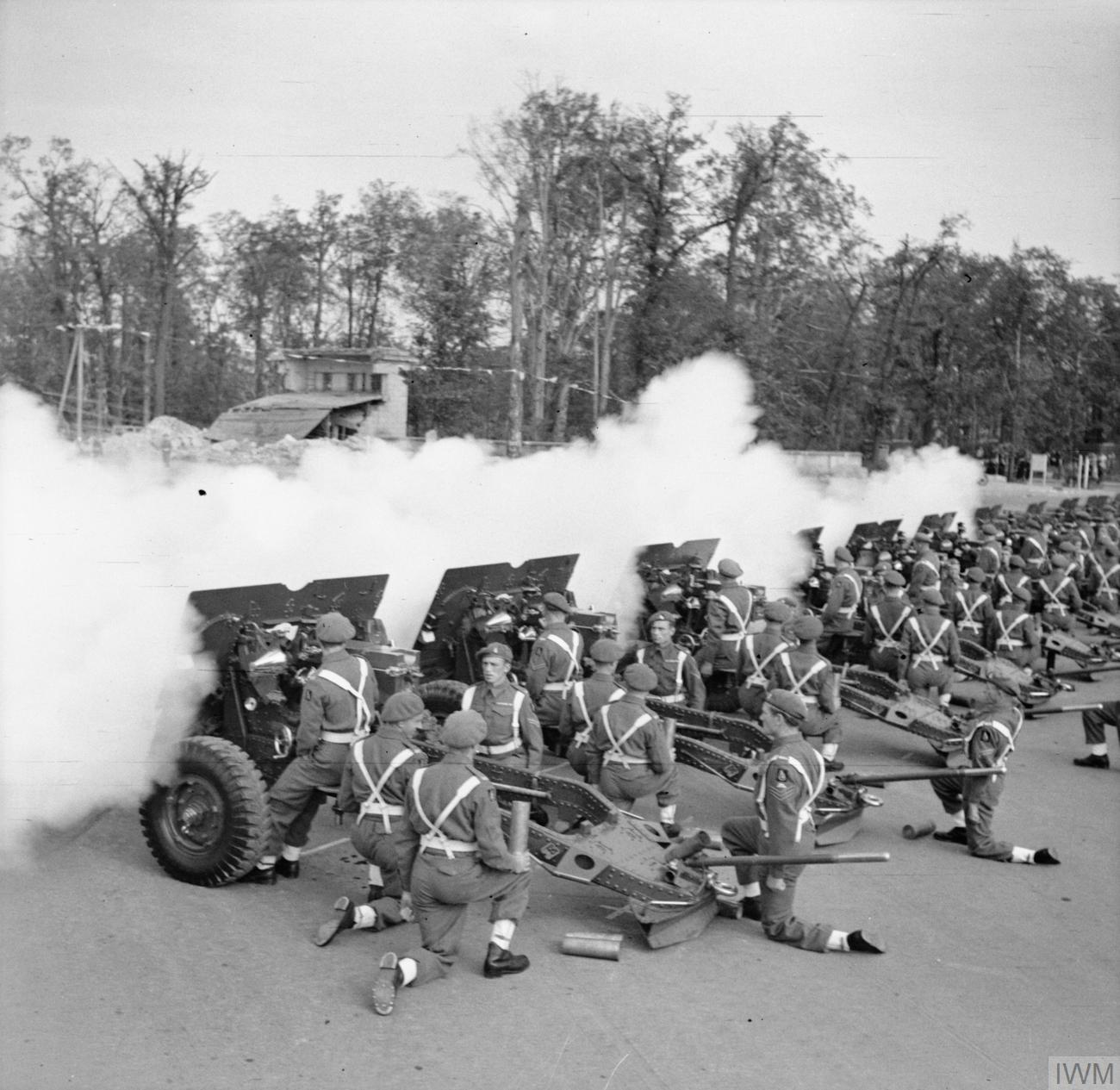
British Victory Parade in Berlin: Salute fired by guns of the 3rd Royal Horse Artillery on the arrival of Prime Minister Winston Churchill.

By the outbreak of the Second World War, the regiment was still in Egypt and on 16 October 1939 was assigned to Headquarters Royal Artillery Group (Middle East Reserve) as an anti-tank regiment armed with 2 pounder guns. M Battery, however, was permanently attached to the Armoured Division (Egypt) (later the 7th Armoured Division, the "Desert Rats"). In March 1941, P Battery left the regiment to join 6th Regiment, Royal Horse Artillery in the United Kingdom. In practice just the title was transferred; the personnel and equipment were distributed amongst D, J and M batteries making them up to eight-gun units. On 1 March 1941, the regiment joined M Battery in 7th Support Group and all three batteries were redesignated as anti-tank. The regiment took part in the final attempt to lift the Siege of Tobruk, Operation Crusader (18 November – 10 December) – notably the Battle of Sidi Rezegh where Second Lieutenant George Ward Gunn (J Battery) earned the Victoria Cross for his bravery during an attack by 60 German Tanks. (Note: Acting Brigadier Jock Campbell, commander of 7th Support Group, also won a Victoria Cross in the same action.) On 26 April 1954, J Battery was awarded the Honour Title "Sidi Rezegh" in recognition of this action. The regiment was rearmed with 25 pounders after Sidi Rezegh, and the batteries were redesignated as field artillery on 8 September 1942.

The regiment left the 7th Support Group on 8 February 1942 (the day before it was reformed as the 7th Motor Brigade) and was assigned directly to the 7th Armoured Division; it remained with the division for the rest of the war. The regiment supported the 7th Armoured Division during the rest of the Western Desert campaign taking part in the Battle of Gazala (26 June – 21 June 1942), the Defence of the El Alamein Line (1 – 27 July), the Battle of Alam el Halfa (30 August – 7 September), and the Battle of El Alamein (23 October – 4 November). (Note: During the Battle of El Alamein, the regiment was armed with twenty-four 25 pounders.) It then took part in the Tunisian campaign including the Battles of Medenine (6 March 1943), Mareth (16 – 23 March), Akarit (6 and 7 April), Enfidaville (19 – 29 April), and Tunis (5 – 12 May).

The regiment was withdrawn to Libya to rest and refit thereby missing the Sicilian campaign. It next took part in the Italian campaign: the Salerno Landings (9 – 18 September 1943), the Capture of Naples (22 September – 1 October), and the Volturno Crossing (12 – 15 October). It then returned to the United Kingdom, arriving on 4 January 1944. It continued to support 7th Armoured Division, as a follow-up formation, following the Normandy Landings In 1945, the regiment led the Allied Victory parade in Berlin, and fired the Victory Salute.

=== Post War ===
After World War II the regiment served in the UK, West Germany, Aden, Egypt, Kenya (September 1961-September 1964 with the regiment's main body at Alanbrooke Barracks, Gilgil) Hong Kong and Cyprus. In 1958, C Battery joined the regiment, and M Battery was placed in suspended animation. By 1975, M Battery had been revived. In 1976, the regiment completed another tour of Northern Ireland, as part of Operation Banner. In 1978, the regiment was placed in suspended animation with the batteries becoming independent anti-tank batteries. In 1984, the regiment was reformed at Paderborn, Germany. M Battery was once again placed in suspended animation. The regiment also served in the Former Republic of Yugoslavia. In 1993, N Battery (The Eagle Troop) joined the regiment, and M Battery was amalgamated with Headquarters Battery to form M Headquarters Battery. Furthermore, in 1999, the regiment deployed with UNPROFOR to Bosnia

In 1998, the regiment moved to Caen Barracks, Hohne Station, in Germany to succeed 40th Regiment Royal Artillery and becaome part of the 7th Armoured Brigade, the Desert Rats. They remained in Hohne until it closed in 2015.

In December 2000, D Battery deployed as part of NATO's KFOR to Kosovo on Op Agricola.

Under Army 2020, the regiment will provide force support to the Adaptable Force. In 2013, it re-roled from AS-90s to L118 Light Guns. From 1 March 2015 to 1 July 2022, the 105th Regiment Royal Artillery was paired with this regiment.

From 2020 to 2022, the Regiment deployed as part of the NATO Enhanced Forward Presence on Operation Cabrit (Poland and Estonia).

Under the Future Soldier Programme, the regiment merged with the 3rd Deep Reconnaissance Strike Brigade (a merger of 1st Armoured Infantry Brigade and 1st Artillery Brigade) in 1 July 2022. In March 2023, the regiment re-roled to the Deep Fires role losing its L118 Light guns and replaced them with new M270 MLR Systems. Two batteries (C & D) re-equipped with the M270, while J (Sidi Rezegh) Battery became the headquarters battery and M Battery was placed in suspended animation. N Battery (Eagle Troop) joined 7 Parachute Regiment, RHA as N Parachute Battery (Eagle Troop). On deployment, the regiment would be supported by a battery of the reserve 101st (Northumbrian) Regiment, RA.

== Batteries ==
The Regiment consists of the following batteries:

- J (Sidi Rezegh) Battery Royal Horse Artillery – Headquarters
- C Battery Royal Horse Artillery – M270A2 MLRS
- D Battery Royal Horse Artillery – M270A2 MLRS
- W (Workshop) – Royal Electrical and Mechanical Engineers & Royal Logistic Corps
- M Battery Royal Horse Artillery – Inactive

== Equipment ==
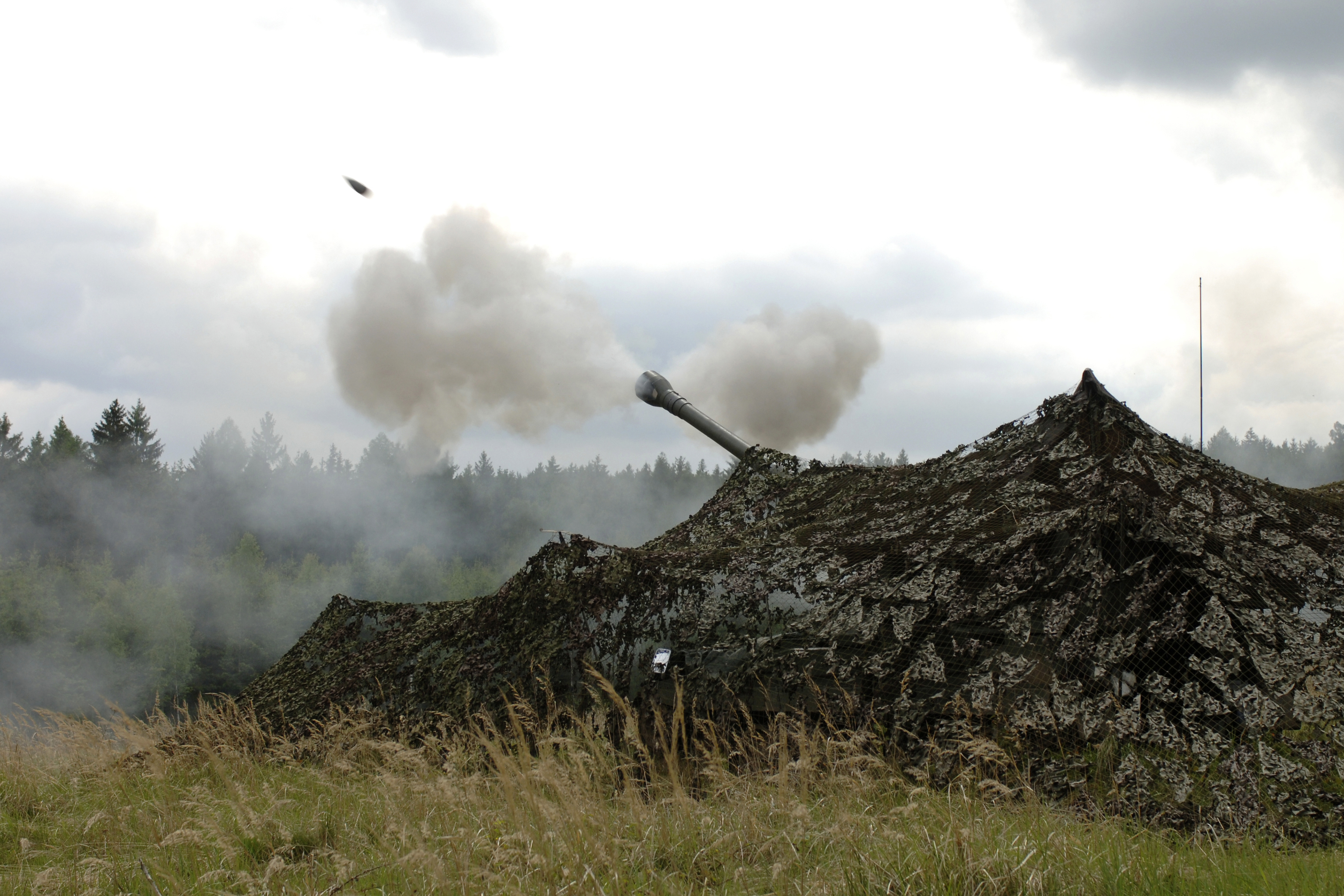
D Battery, 3rd Royal Horse Artillery firing an AS-90 on exercise in the Czech Republic, 12 May 2009.

The regiment has been equipped with the following weapons during its existence:

- QF 3.7-inch mountain howitzer
- Ordnance QF 2-pounder anti-tank gun – 2-pounder
- Ordnance QF 25-pounder field gun-howitzer – 25-pounder
- Sexton self-propelled 25-pounder
- BL 5.5-inch Medium Gun – 5.5-inch gun
- OTO Melara Mod 56 – 105 mm pack howitzer
- FV433 Abbot SPG 105 mm self-propelled howitzer
- Swingfire anti-tank guided missile
- FH70 155 mm towed howitzer
- AS-90 155 mm self-propelled howitzer
- L118 light gun 105 mm towed howitzer
- M270 MLRS 227 mm multiple launch rocket system

== See also ==
- British Army
- Royal Artillery
- Royal Horse Artillery
- List of Royal Artillery Batteries

== Bibliography ==
- Clarke, W.G. (1993). Horse Gunners: The Royal Horse Artillery, 200 Years of Panache and Professionalism. Woolwich: The Royal Artillery Institution. ISBN 09520762-0-9.
- Forty, George (1998). British Army Handbook 1939-1945. Stroud, Gloucestershire: Sutton Publishing Limited. ISBN 0-7509-1403-3.
- Frederick, J.B.M. (1984). Lineage Book of British Land Forces 1660–1978. Wakefield, Yorkshire: Microform Academic Publishers. ISBN 1-85117-009-X.
- Joslen, Lt-Col H.F. (1990) [1st. Pub. HMSO:1960]. Orders of Battle, Second World War, 1939–1945. London: London Stamp Exchange. ISBN 0-948130-03-2.
