= William Olpherts =

British army officer and Victoria Cross recipient

General Sir William Olpherts VC GCB
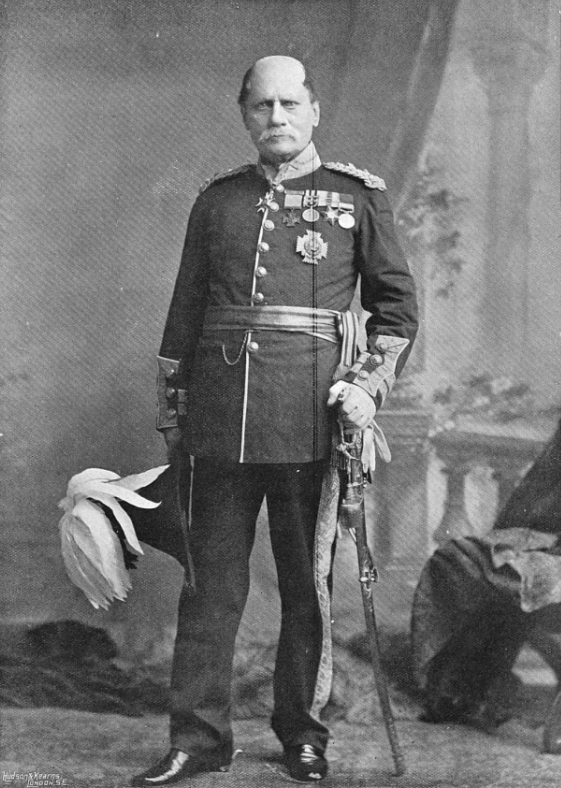
- Born: 8 March 1822; Dartry, County Armagh
- Died: 30 April 1902 (aged 80); Upper Norwood, London
- Burial place: Richmond Cemetery, Surrey
- Military career
- Allegiance: United Kingdom
- Branch: Bengal Army; British Indian Army; British Army
- Rank: General
- Conflicts: Gwalior campaign; First Anglo-Sikh War; Crimean War; Indian Mutiny
- Awards: Victoria Cross; Knight Grand Cross of the Order of the Bath

General Sir William Olpherts, VC, GCB (8 March 1822 – 30 April 1902) was an East India Company Army and British Army officer and an Irish recipient of the Victoria Cross, the highest award for gallantry in the face of the enemy that can be awarded to British and Commonwealth forces.

== Early life ==
Olpherts was born on 8 March 1822 at Dartry, Blackwatertown near Armagh, son of William Olpherts of Dartry House, County Armagh. He was educated at the Royal School Dungannon, and in 1837 received a nomination to the East India Company's Military Seminary at Addiscombe. He passed out in the artillery, and joined the headquarters of the Bengal Artillery at Dum Dum in December 1839.

On the outbreak of disturbances in the Tenasserim province of Burma, Olpherts was detached to Moulmein in October 1841 with four guns. Returning at the end of nine months, he was again ordered on field service to quell an insurrection in the neighbourhood of Saugor, and was thanked in the despatch of the officer commanding the artillery for his conduct in action with the insurgents at Jhirna Ghaut on 12 November 1842.

Having passed as interpreter in the native languages, Olpherts was given the command of the 16th Bengal Light Field Battery, and joined Sir Hugh Gough's expedition against Gwalior. Olpherts's battery was posted on the wing of the army commanded by General Grey, Lieutenant (Sir) Henry Tombs, V.C., being his subaltern. He was heavily engaged at Punniar on 29 December 1843, and was mentioned in despatches.

For his services in the Gwalior campaign Olpherts received the bronze decoration. Being specially selected by the governor-general, Lord Ellenborough, to raise and command a battery of horse artillery for the Bundelcund legion, he was at once detached with the newly raised battery to join Sir Charles Napier's army in Sindh. His march across India, a distance of 1260 miles, elicited Napier's highest praise. In 1846 Olpherts took part in the operations at Kot Kangra during the first Sikh war, when his conduct attracted the attention of (Sir) Henry Lawrence, and he was appointed to raise a battery of artillery from among the disbanded men of the Sikh army. He was then hurried off to the Deccan in command of a battery of artillery in the service of the Nizam of Hyderabad, but was soon recalled to a similar post in the Gwalior contingent. In 1851 Olpherts applied to be posted to a battery at Peshawur, where he was under the command of Sir Colin Campbell and took part in the expedition against the frontier tribes. For this service he afterwards received the India General Service Medal sanctioned in 1869 for frontier wars. In the following year (1852) Olpherts took furlough to England, and was appointed an orderly officer at the Military College of Addiscombe.

== Crimean War ==
On the outbreak of the Crimean War in 1854, Olpherts volunteered for service and was selected to join (Sir) William Fenwick Williams at Kars. On his way there, he visited the Crimea. Crossing the Black Sea, he rode over the Zigana mountains in the deep snow; but soon after reaching Kars he was detached to command a Turkish force of 7000 men to guard against a possible advance of the Russians from Erivan by the Araxes river. Olpherts thus escaped being involved in the surrender of Kars. Recalled to the Crimea, he was nominated to the command of a brigade of bashi bazouks in the Turkish contingent. On the conclusion of peace in 1856 he returned to India, and received the command of a horse battery at Benares.

== Indian Mutiny ==
Olpherts served throughout the suppression of the Indian Mutiny (1857–59). He was with Brigadier James Neill when he defeated the mutineers at Benares on 4 June 1857, and accompanied Havelock during the Relief of Lucknow. His conduct in the course of that operation was highly distinguished and was to earn him the Victoria Cross. As a result, the Battery he commanded (now part of the Royal Regiment of Artillery) was later awarded his name as their title, commemorating both William Olphert and the distinguished actions of the unit that day. The Battery, 56 (Olpherts) Battery Royal Artillery, still exists today.

=== Victoria Cross action ===
His citation for the action reads:

For highly distinguished conduct on the 25th of September, 1857 when the troops penetrated into the city of Lucknow, in having charged on horseback, with Her Majesty's 90th Regiment, when gallantly headed by Colonel Campbell, it captured two guns in the face of a heavy fire of grape, and having afterwards returned, under a severe fire of musketry, to bring up limbers and horses to carry off the captured ordnance, which he accomplished.

— Extract from Field Force Orders of the late Major-General Havelock, 17 October 1857

=== Later acts ===
Olpherts almost surpassed this piece of bravery by another, two days later. When the main body of Havelock's force penetrated to the Residency, the rearguard consisting of the 90th with some guns and ammunition was entirely cut off. However, Olpherts, with Colonel Robert (afterwards Lord) Napier, sallied out with a small party, and by his cool determination brought in the wounded of the rearguard as well as the guns.

Sir James Outram, then in command of the Residency at Lucknow, wrote: "My dear heroic Olpherts, bravery is a poor and insufficient epithet to apply to a valour such as yours." Colonel Napier wrote in his despatch to the same effect.

From the entry into Lucknow of Havelock's force until the relief by Sir Colin Campbell on 21 November Olpherts acted as brigadier of artillery, and after the evacuation of the Residency by Sir Colin Campbell he shared in the defence of the advanced position at the Alumbagh under Sir James Outram. He took part in the siege and capture of the city by Sir Colin Campbell in March 1858, being again mentioned in despatches for conspicuous bravery. At the close of the campaign Olpherts received the brevets of major and lieutenant-colonel, as well as the Victoria Cross, the Indian Mutiny medal with two clasps, and the Companionship of the Bath.

== Campaigns in India ==
In 1859–60 Olpherts served as a volunteer under Brigadier (Sir) Neville Chamberlain in an expedition against the Waziris on the north-west frontier of the Punjab, thus completing twenty years of continuous active service. Olpherts's dash and daring earned for him the sobriquet of "Hell-fire Jack", but he modestly gave all the credit for any action of his to the men under him. From 1861 to 1868 he commanded the artillery in the frontier stations of Peshawur or Rawal Pindi, and in that year he returned home on furlough, when he was presented with a sword of honour by the city and county of Armagh. Returning to India in 1872, he commanded successively the Gwalior, Ambala, and Lucknow brigades, but quit the country in 1875 on attaining the rank of major-general. He was promoted lieutenant-general on 1 October 1877, general on 31 March 1883, and in 1888 became colonel commandant of the Royal Artillery. Olpherts was raised to the dignity of K.C.B. in 1886 and of G.C.B. in the 1900 Birthday Honours.

== Retirement ==
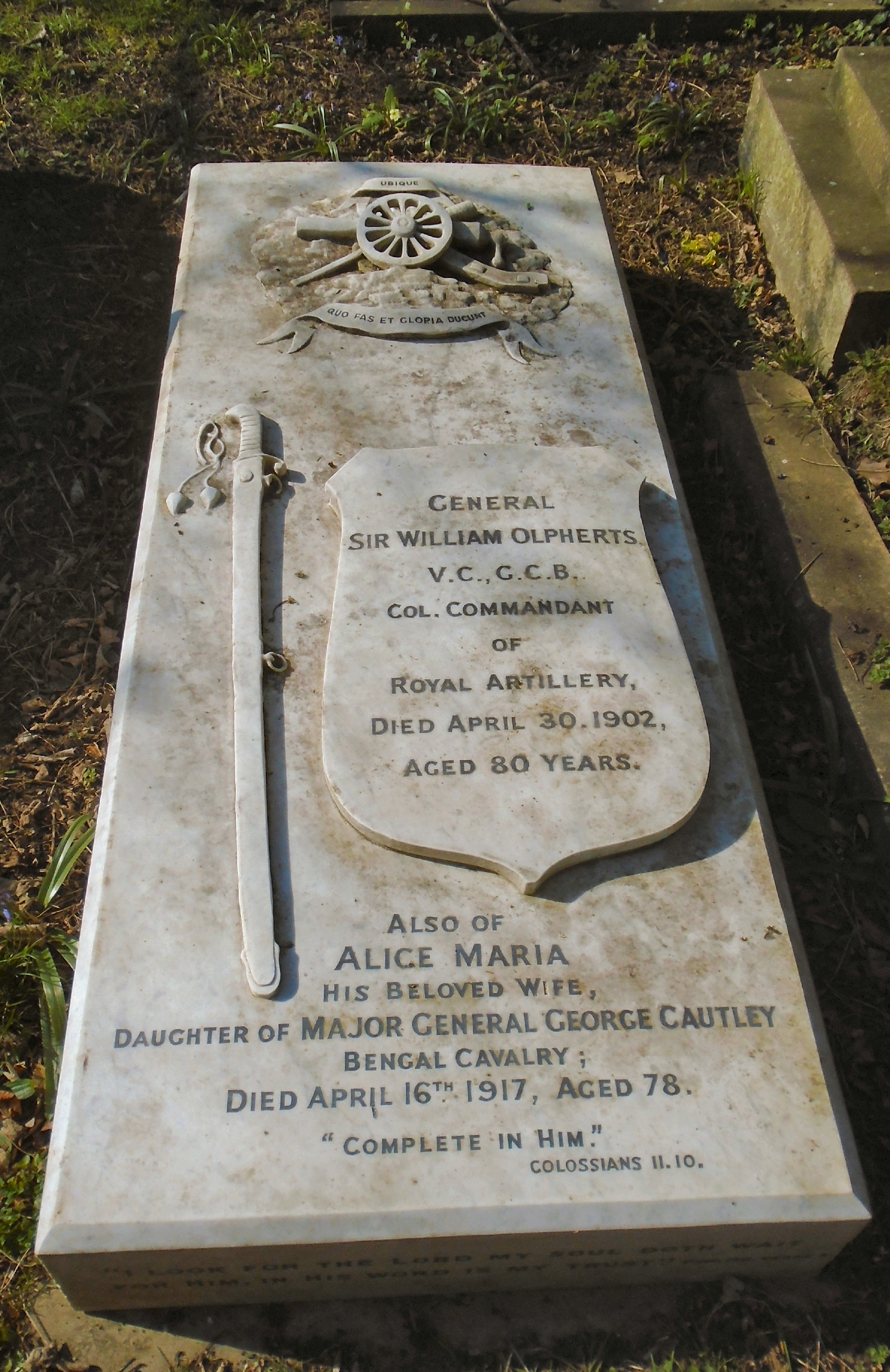
Grave of Olpherts and his wife Alice in Richmond Cemetery

He died at his residence, Wood House, Upper Norwood, on 30 April 1902, and was buried at Richmond Cemetery, Surrey (now in London). Olpherts married in 1861 Alice, daughter of Major-general George Cautley of the Bengal cavalry, by whom he had one son, Major Olpherts, late of the Royal Scots, and three daughters.

His Victoria Cross is displayed at the National Army Museum, Chelsea.
