= Operation Karez =

2008 military operation in Afghanistan

- Part of the War in Afghanistan (2001–2021)
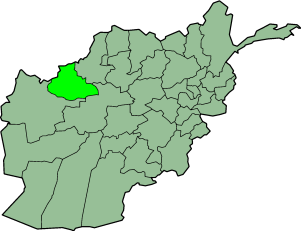
- Afghanistan map
Date	May 13–23, 2008
Location	Badghis province, Afghanistan
Result	See aftermath

Belligerents
ISAF: •Norway •France •Germany •United States •Croatia; Islamic Republic of Afghanistan	(Afghanistan) Taliban

Commanders and leaders
(Norway) Lt. Col. Kjell Inge Bækken (Germany) Brig. Gen. Dieter Dammjacob	(Afghanistan) Unknown

Strength
(Norway) 250 soldiers from Telemark Battalion (Germany) 60 soldiers (mainly recce, signal and logistic personnel) (United States) est. 35 soldiers (ETT and PSD) (Croatia) 30 soldiers	150 insurgents ~500 support fighters

Casualties and losses
None	13–15 killed

Operation Karez was a military operation between May 13–23, 2008 involving Norwegian and German ISAF and Afghan government forces against the Taliban as part of the war in Afghanistan. Their objective was to eliminate the presence of Taliban insurgents who had regrouped in the area in the aftermath of Operation Harekate Yolo in late 2007.

It was the second time in half a year that Norwegian and German ISAF forces had participated in a major offensive in the restless Badghis province in western Afghanistan. It was also the first time that the professional soldiers of the Telemark Battalion had participated in actual combat.

The name of the operation derives from the Afghan word for kareez, which is a water management system used to provide a reliable supply of water to human settlements and irrigation in hot, arid and semi-arid climates.

== Background ==
In the aftermath of the tactical victory by the ISAF forces in Operation Harekate Yolo in October–November 2007, the Taliban insurgents fled to the mountainous border regions of Afghanistan and Turkmenistan. However, the goal of the operation was not realized, as various aid organisations could not enter the poor Badghis province. This, along with a lack of control of the region by the Afghan government, gave the Taliban insurgents an opportunity to establish a stronghold there.

As a result, the National Joint Headquarters (Fellesoperativt Hovedkvarter - FOHK) prepared elements of the Telemark Battalion, which makes up the Norwegian Quick Response Force (QRF) with its base Mazar-e Sharif in northern Afghanistan, to create better security for the central government in the area, which would make it possible for the aid organisations to enter Badghis province and provide assistance for its poor population.

== The operation ==
The long planned operation was initiated on May 13 and lasted for ten days. By the twilight of the first day of the operation, the 250 Norwegian soldiers had encamped next to the village of Kor-i Karez, all according to plan. Suddenly the Norwegian soldiers came under fire from Taliban insurgents armed with rifles, machine guns and rocket propelled grenades. The Taliban insurgents attacked from a distance of around 1200 metres, in what Major Rune Wenneberg described as a "well coordinated assault" against the soldiers of Telemark Battalion. While initially surprising the Norwegian ISAF soldiers, they quickly took control of the situation, and supported by CV 9030 armoured vehicles and mortars, the soldiers of the Telemark Battalion were able to successfully repel the Taliban assault. The exchange of fire dropped in intensity after the Norwegian soldiers used heavy weaponry against the insurgents, and after a couple of hours the Taliban insurgents had fled the scene.

The Commander of the QRF, Lt. Col. Kjell Inge Bækken was proud of the professionalism and the calmness the Norwegian soldiers showed during the whole clash, further stating that they had trained long for military operations such as these. The participating soldiers also commented that the training they got at home was important for their success in the operation.

On May 14 and May 16 the soldiers of the Telemark Battalion engaged the Taliban insurgents in two further confrontations from a safe distance, again supported by CV 9030 armoured vehicles, mortars and NATO close air support, as well as by Afghan security forces.

=== United States participation ===
Along with 35 ETT and a PSD from ARSIC-N, US forces embedded with and supported Afghan commandos from May 17–19 participating in Afghan air assaults. These air assaults were conducted in Russian MI-16 helicopters to create a solid cordon while Norwegians pushed through forcing enemy combatants right into the cordon where they were stripped of any firearms and detained or engaged at times. The U.S. soldiers on these air assaults made history as the air assaults were a historic first for Afghan Airforce pilots and loadmasters.

=== German participation ===
The circumstances of the participation of the German soldiers in the operation is disputed. Whilst German sources stated that they were participating in Operation Karez in northern Afghanistan in conjunction with the Afghan army and the Norwegian QRF, the German magazine Der Spiegel stated that the German government hesitated to deploy the reconnaissance, logistics and KSK forces originally promised by the German regional commander. The reason given was that the area of operation, which is in Ghormach district, lay exactly on the border with the area under Italian command. For domestic political reasons, the German government is very intent on only deploying ISAF soldiers to RC North and Kabul, which are covered by the mandate from parliament, even if this interferes with operational realities. It was only on May 17 that the German Minister of defense, Franz Josef Jung, decided to approve the German participation in the operation. At that point, the Norwegian and Afghan forces active in the engagement had already been fighting the Taliban for a week.

The National Joint Headquarters would neither confirm or deny the information in the Spiegel article.

== Aftermath ==
On May 23 the ISAF-led operations concluded with no casualties among the ISAF soldiers nor the Afghan security forces. The Norwegian soldiers and officers received very good response from NATO for their successful use of NATO tactics in combat, which focuses on the deliberate strategy of avoiding casualties and using heavy weaponry over long distances.

According to the official spokesperson of the National Joint Headquarters, Lt. Col. John Inge Øglænd, it was one of the largest operations Norwegian soldiers have carried out in this part of Afghanistan, the size of the operation in November last year in which about 50 people were killed.

The given numbers of Taliban insurgent casualties in the operation vary, but were estimated between 13 and 15 killed in action. According to the Commander of the QRF, Lt. Col. Kjell Inge Bækken, there were no reports of civilians casualties in the operation.

== See also ==
- Operation Harekate Yolo
