= Alfred Smith (VC) =

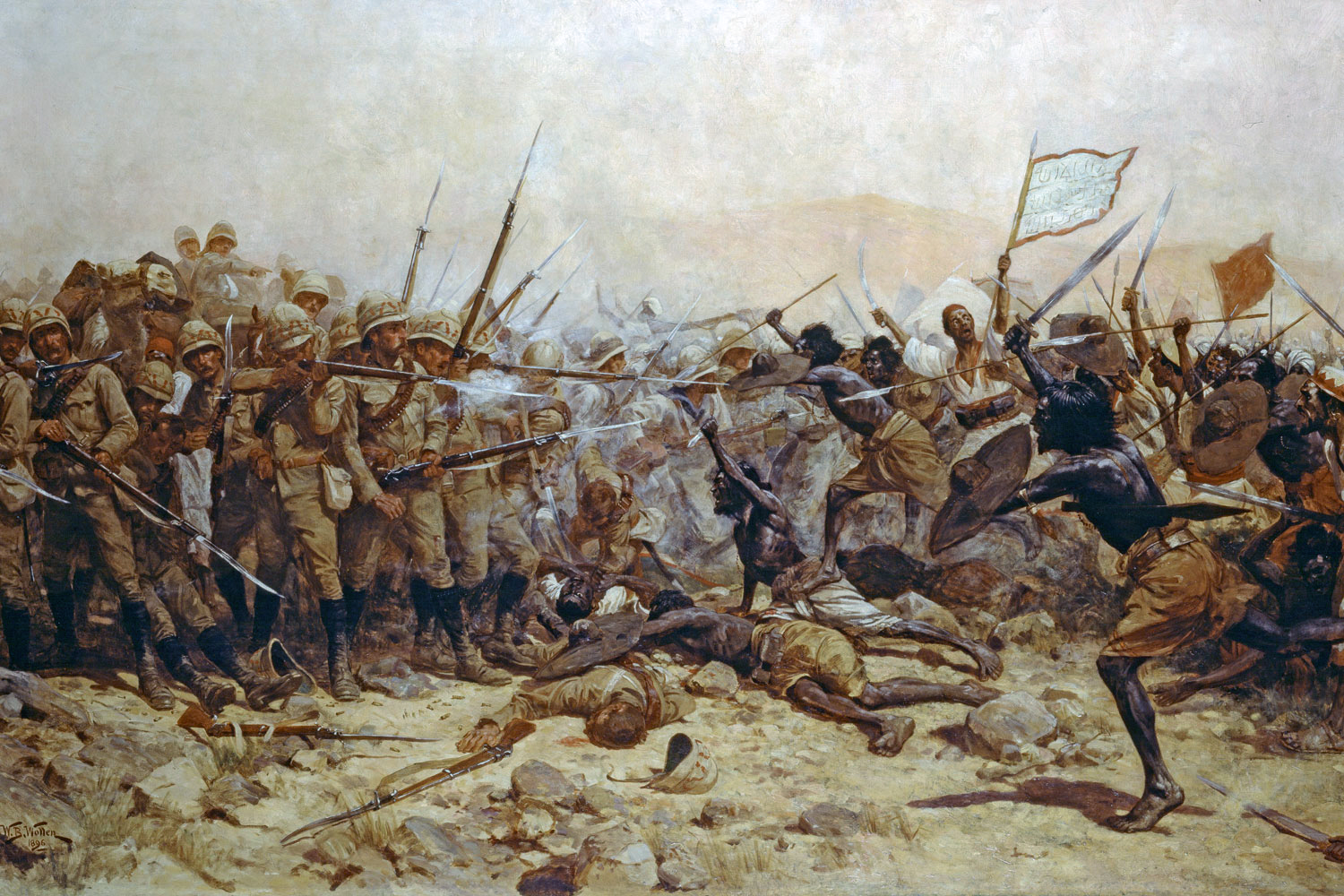
- Depiction of the battle of Abu Klea
- Born: 13 March 1860; London
- Died: 6 January 1932 (aged 71–72); Plumstead
- Burial place: Plumstead Cemetery
- Military career
- Allegiance: United Kingdom
- Branch: British Army
- Rank: Gunner
- Units: Royal Regiment of Artillery
- Conflicts: Mahdist War
- Awards: Victoria Cross

Alfred Smith VC (1860–6 January 1932) was an English recipient of the Victoria Cross, the highest and most prestigious award for gallantry in the face of the enemy that can be awarded to British and Commonwealth forces.

Smith was 24 years old, and a gunner in the Royal Regiment of Artillery, British Army during the Mahdist War, when the following deed took place for which he was awarded the VC.

"At the Action of Abu Klea, on the 17th January last [1885], when the enemy charged, the square fell back a short, distance, leaving Lieutenant Guthrie, Royal Artillery, with his gun, in a comparatively unprotected position. At this moment a native rushed at Lieutenant Guthrie with a spear and would in all probability have killed that officer, who had no weapon in his hand at the time (being engaged in superintending the working of his gun), when Gunner Smith with a gun handspike warded off the thrust, thus giving Lieutenant Guthrie time to draw his sword, and with a blow bring the assailant to his knees, but as the latter fell he made a wild thrust at the Officer with a long knife, which Gunner Smith again warded off, not however before the native had managed to inflict a wound in Lieutenant Guthrie's thigh. Before the Soudani could repeat the thrust Gunner Smith killed him with the handspike and thus for the time saved the life of his Officer, though the latter unfortunately died some days afterwards of his wound".

In 1895, while working at the Royal Arsenal at Woolwich, Smith was involved in an accident when his forearm was crushed by machinery.

His Victoria Cross is displayed at the Royal Artillery Museum, Woolwich, England.

Gunner Smith's unit, 1 Battery, Southern Division, Royal Artillery, was later re-numbered 176 Battery and still exists today. In 1955 it was awarded the honour title "Abu Klea" in recognition of Gunner Smith's VC.
