= 39th Regiment Royal Artillery =

- Active: 1 April 1947 to 20 February 2015
- Branch: British Army
- Type: Artillery
- Garrison/HQ: Albemarle Barracks, Northumberland
- Nickname: The Welsh Gunners
- Equipment: M270 Multiple Launch Rocket System
- Battle honours: UBIQUE

39 Regiment Royal Artillery (RA) was part of the British Army's Royal Artillery. Its name is pronounced "three nine", The Regiment was one of the Depth fire units of 1st Artillery Brigade, part of the British Army. It was formed in 1947, and placed into suspended animation on 20 February 2015. The Regiment was based at Albemarle Barracks in Northumberland.

As of 2011, the regiment was equipped with the Guided Multiple Launch Rocket System (GMLRS). They will be the first unit to deploy the new Fire Shadow loitering munition; training has already begun and they were planned to take it to Afghanistan in 2012. The regiment deployed Batteries on Op Herrick and fired the first GMLRS rounds in theatre.

Under Army 2020, the regiment was disbanded and its GMLRS launchers transferred to the other RA regiments and the Territorial Army. The regimental flag was lowered on 20 February 2015.

== History ==
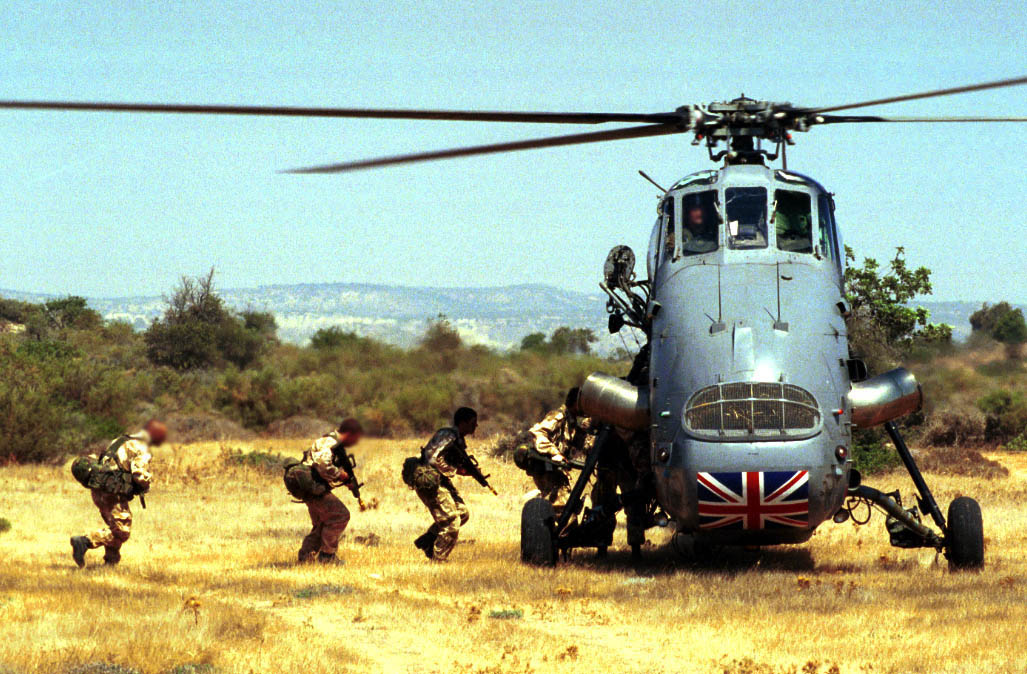
A stick of soldiers from 39 Regiment Royal Artillery rush to get onto a Wessex helicopter during an exercise in Cyprus in which the regiment practised operating in the infantry role

39 Regiment Royal Artillery was formed with the re-designation of 2 Medium Regiment RA on 1 April 1947. It was originally equipped with BL 5.5 inch Medium Gun and was first stationed in the Middle East and Africa. The Regiment left the Middle East in 1948 after an Emergency Tour to Palestine, where it deployed to Ayrshire and was re-equipped with the M59 155 mm Long Tom Gun. It converted to a 155mm Self Propelled Regiment in 1955 and deployed to Cyprus to support operations against EOKA with batteries based in Episkopi, Dhekhlia, and Jophinou in 1958.

In 1960 the Regiment moved to support the BAOR, and was based in Dempsey Barracks in Sennelager for the next 35 years. Here it became a Missile Regiment (one of three in the nuclear role), and was equipped with Honest John Rockets and towed M115 203 mm howitzer. 75 Battery was placed in suspended animation and was replaced by H Battery (Ramsay's Troop) Royal Artillery in 1967. The Regiment was caught up in the Coup d'état by Captain Gaddafi in Libya in 1969, and the Regiment's 2IC was captured and held hostage, but later released unharmed. There was a further reorganisation with 39 Medium Regiment using the M109 Howitzer and M110 Self Propelled Guns in 1972, and 132 Bty RA and 176 (Abu Klea) Bty RA joining H Battery. The Regiment completed four tours of Northern Ireland over the next seven years.

The regiment was redesignated 39 Field Regiment with H Bty, 132 & 176 Btys in 1977. 43 Bty joined Regt. equipped with Blowpipe. On 15 Mar 1980 the regiment was granted Freedom of the City of Paderborn, Germany. It was redesignated 39 Heavy Regiment was joined by 56 (Olpherts) Bty RA, 34 (Seringapatam) Battery and 76 (Maude's) Battery in 1982. H Battery was placed into suspended animation and 132 Battery together with 176 Battery departed for the Royal School of Artillery at Larkhill. In 1985 132 Battery and 176 Battery rejoined the Regiment with the M110 Self Propelled Gun role and 56 Battery converted to a special weapons battery, equipped with the M109 Self Propelled Guns. Then in August 1990 39 Heavy Regiment took delivery of the Multiple Launch Rocket System MLRS, and was given seven months to convert, complete training and become operational. However, in December 1990 the Regiment was deployed to Saudi Arabia as part of 1st Armoured Division during Operation Granby.

In 1993, the regiment was joined by 57 (Bhurtpore) Battery Royal Artillery, who were to be equipped with the Phoenix UAV, and deployed to Cyprus, as the British detachment in UNFICYP. This tour saw the Danish and Canadian Contingents leave, with only the Austrians and the British left. Argentina then sent a force to control Sector One, the Austrians were in charge of Sector Three and the British in charge of Sector Two. This was the first time that British and Argentine army units had met since the Falklands War in 1982. In 1995 39 Regiment left Dempsey Barracks, and moved to Albemarle Barracks in Northumberland.

In 1996, the regiment deployed again to Cyprus in support of UNFICYP. The island experienced some of its highest tension along the buffer zone in 30 years, and two of the Regiments soldiers were shot and wounded by Turkish Troops. The regiment deployed to Northern Ireland in 1998. The Regiment supported MAFF, in the North-East of the UK, during the Foot and mouth outbreak. 57 Battery deployed to Kosovo to carry out UAV flights in 2001. In 2003 57 Battery moved to 32 Regt RA, which was reorganised as one of the Royal Artillery Surveillance and Target Acquisition Regiments with its focus on UAVs; 74 Bty (The Battle Axe Company) joined 39 Regiment.

39 Regiment completed several tours of Northern Ireland in that period, as the Urban Reinforcement Battalion. It continued to support operations in the province, until the end of Operation Banner in 2007. Soldiers of the Regiment also deployed to Kuwait and Iraq as part of Operation Telic. In 2004 35 Bty RA joined 39 Regiment after the disbandment of 22nd Regiment Royal Artillery.

The Regiment was also equipped with GMLRS in 2004. The Regiment continued to deploy soldiers to Afghanistan to support Op Herrick at that time. 39 Regiment was disbanded on 20 February 2015 at Albemarle Barracks in Northumberland.

== Batteries ==
The regiment's batteries were as follows:

- 35 Battery
- 51 (Kabul 1842) Battery
- 56 (Olpherts) Headquarters Battery
- 74 Battery (The Battleaxe Company)
- 132 (Bengal Rocket Troop) Battery
- 176 (Abu Klea) Battery
