= Albemarle Barracks, England =

British Army barracks in Northumberland

Albemarle Barracks
- Near Stamfordham, Northumberland in England
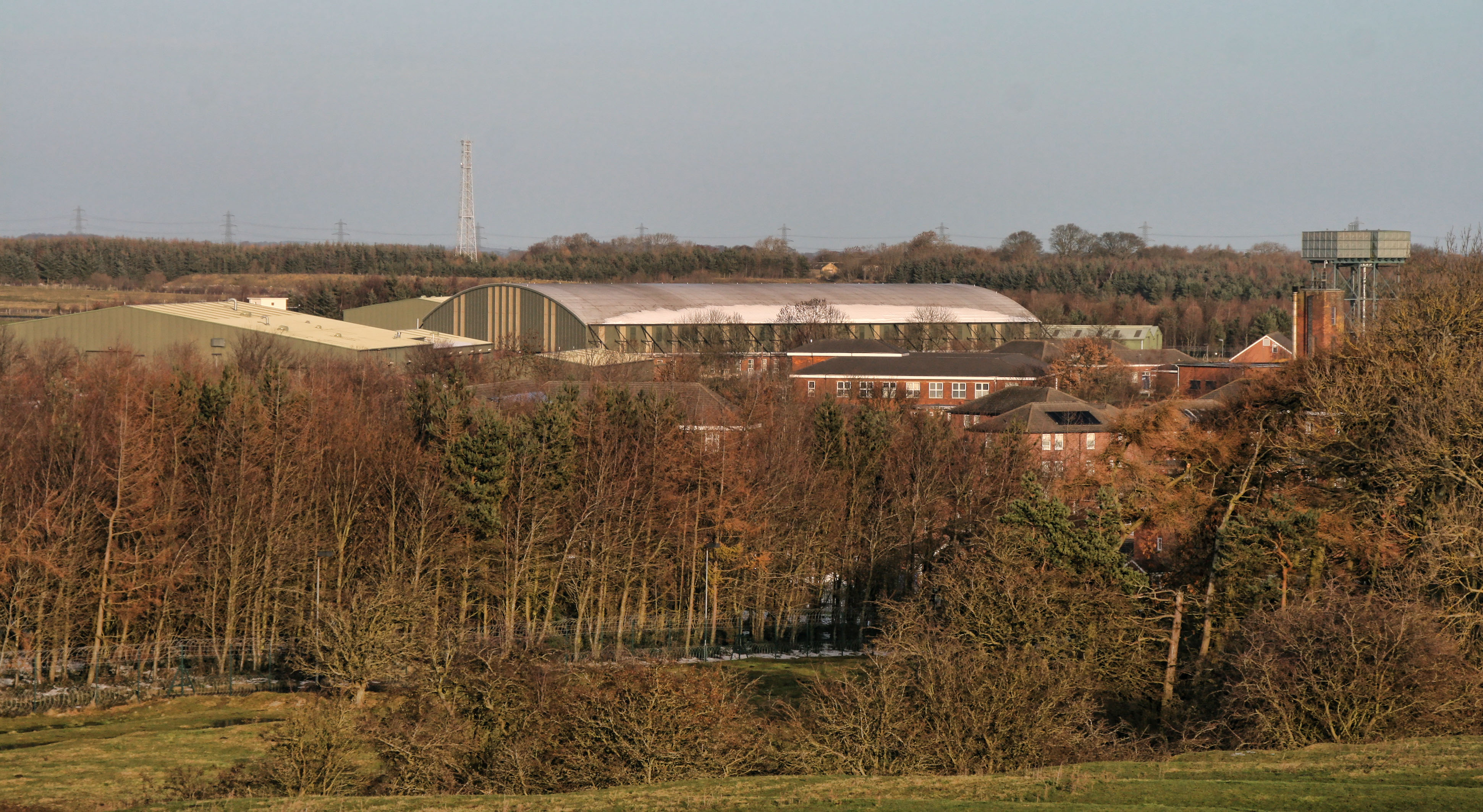
- View from Harlow Hill looking across Albemarle Barracks.

Site information
- Type: Barracks
- Owner: Ministry of Defence
- Operator: British Army

Location
- Shown within Northumberland
- Coordinates: 55°01′03″N 001°52′25″W

Site history
- Built: 1970
- Built for: War Office
- In use: 1970-Present

Garrison information
- Occupants: 3rd Regiment, Royal Horse Artillery

Albemarle Barracks is a British Army barracks located 1.7 miles (2.7 km) south of Stamfordham, Northumberland and 10.5 miles (16.9 km) west of Newcastle-upon-Tyne, Tyne and Wear.

== History ==
The barracks were established on the site of the former RAF Ouston airbase in 1970. The barracks were occupied by Junior Signalmans Wing of 11 Signal Regiment in the 1970s, before they were handed over to the Junior Infantry Battalion in the mid-1980s.

The barracks were home to 39 Regiment Royal Artillery from 1995, until that regiment disbanded there in February 2015. The 3rd Regiment Royal Horse Artillery moved from its former base in Bergen-Hohne Garrison, Germany, to Albemarle Barracks in 2015.

The runways are used by Northumbria Police for driver training and as a stop-off point for nuclear warheads convoys en route via road between RNAD Coulport and AWE Aldermaston as part of the UK Trident programme.

== Current units ==
- 3rd Regiment, Royal Horse Artillery
