= 44th Siege Battery, Royal Garrison Artillery =

44th Siege Battery, RGA
- Cap Badge of the Royal Regiment of Artillery
- Active: 12 July 1915–present
- Country: United Kingdom
- Branch: British Army
- Role: Railway artillery
- Part of: Royal Garrison Artillery
- Garrison/HQ: Sheerness
- Engagements: Somme; Vimy Ridge; Cambrai; Battles of 1918

The 44th Siege Battery was a unit of Britain's Royal Garrison Artillery (RGA) raised during World War I. It manned heavy Railway guns supporting the British Expeditionary Force on the Western Front from 1916 to 1918, seeing action on the Somme, at Vimy Ridge and at Cambrai. A distant successor unit continues in the present-day Royal Artillery.

== Mobilisation ==
On the outbreak of war in August 1914, units of the part-time Territorial Force (TF) moved into their war stations. The Tynemouth Royal Garrison Artillery was a 'defended ports' unit tasked with manning the defences of the River Tyne. By October 1914, the campaign on the Western Front was bogging down into Trench warfare and there was an urgent need for batteries of siege artillery to be sent to assist the British Expeditionary Force (BEF). Soon TF coast defence units that had volunteered for overseas service were supplying trained gunners to serving RGA units and providing cadres to form complete new units. 44th Siege Battery was formed on 12 July 1915 at Sheerness from a cadre provided by the Tynemouth RGA and Regular RGA coastal gunners brought back from the garrisons of Gibraltar and Malta. Formally, it was a New Army ('Kitchener's Army') unit rather than TF or Regular.

== Service ==
The battery was sent out to the Western Front to man two 12-inch railway howitzers, disembarking at Le Havre on 25 January 1916. On 16 February it was allocated to XIII Corps in Fourth Army, which was preparing for that summer's 'Big Push' (the Battle of the Somme). The battery came under 21st Heavy Artillery Brigade on 12 March and spent the next few weeks constructing dugouts first at Morlancourt and then at Méaulte. On 9 April the battery reported that it had 'Rigged up a haystack with wire netting and straw over No 1 gun position'. It was also digging trenches for buried communication cables. In early May it came under the command of XV Corps, a headquarters that had returned from Egypt and now took over XIII Corps' section of the line for the forthcoming offensive.

=== Somme ===
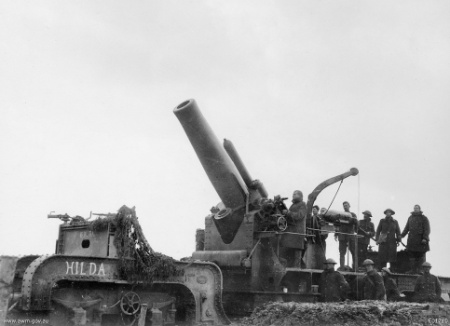
Loading a 12-inch railway howitzer Mark I.

On 2 June the battery brought up its No 1 gun and got it into position during the night under its 'haystack'. On 14 June No 2 gun was got into position near Vivier Farm. On 16 June No 1 gun fired four rounds for registration against Mametz Church. On 24 June both guns fired for registration, No 2 at Fricourt Farm. Then on 26 June the battery joined in the preliminary bombardment for the attack on 1 July. The two howitzers each fired 45–68 rounds per day at Fricourt and Fricourt Farm; at one point No 1 gun crew achieved seven rounds (each weighing 750 pounds (340 kg)) in 11 1/2 minutes. The recoil was so great that the railway embankment from which No 1 gun was firing began to settle, and it had to cease fire until the Royal Engineers (RE) could shore it up. Despite the weight of shelling the first day's assault on Fricourt was a failure, and its capture had to be completed on 2 July.

While No 1 gun fired at Contalmaison, No 2 gun moved near to Bray-sur-Somme on 5 July, then No 1 moved alongside on 8 July. The bombardment of the German second line began on 11 July: No 1 blew up an ammunition store while No 2 was reported to have set fire to Martinpuich Church and to have destroyed an anti-aircraft gun. The attack on the second line (the Battle of Bazentin Ridge) went in on 14 July and the guns fired on Martinpuich and Bazentin-le-Petit.

Over the next three months of the Somme offensive 44th SB continued to engage targets such as High Wood, Delville Wood, Switch Trench, Guillemont, and Ginchy, each the scene of bitter fighting. Firing was often in cooperation with observation balloons and occasionally with aircraft. On 31 August the No 1 gun (No 10 in order of manufacture) was showing signs of wear and was allocated its last 50 rounds. It was replaced by gun No 34 on 6 September, but this lasted only 152 rounds before it suffered torn rifling and was also condemned on 15 September during the Battle of Flers–Courcelette. While No 2 gun continued firing at Gueudecourt, No 1 was sent to Le Havre for replacing. No 2 gun was condemned on 27 September for scoring of the barrel after 1956 rounds fired, but gun and mounting No 40 arrived on 30 September as the battery's new No 1 gun.

XV Corps' participation in the Somme Offensive ended with the Battle of Le Transloy (1–18 October), after which 44th SB was transferred to 69th Heavy Artillery Group (HAG) on 23 October. It continued firing at various targets until the end of the year.

=== Vimy ===
The practice at this stage of the war was to switch batteries and HAG headquarters around as required. 44th Siege Battery moved to 23rd HAG on 27 January 1917, then on 3 February it got orders for an immediate move, joining I ANZAC Corps with Fifth Army on 6 February for the Operations on the Ancre, January–March 1917. Next it was with First Army, first with 55th HAG, then from 18 March with 26th HAG.

First Army was preparing for its part in the forthcoming Arras Offensive, the attack on Vimy Ridge planned for 9 April. The role of heavy howitzers was clarified in early 1917, when it was recognised that they were best suited for counter-battery (CB) fire against well-protected enemy guns. For Vimy there were dedicated CB groups with observation aircraft, beginning 20 days before the attack (Z minus 20) with systematic fire, then from Z minus 10 switching to more vigorous destruction of all known enemy batteries, telephone exchanges and observation posts. First Army's commander, Gen Henry Horne was himself a gunner and took personal command through his Major-General, Royal Artillery, Maj-Gen H.F. Mercer, of the heaviest 15-inch and 12-inch guns. 26th HAG was firing in direct support of the Canadian Corps attacking on Vimy Ridge itself. The huge weight of artillery, including 'some of the most accurate counter-battery fire of the war', together with the dash of the Canadians ensured the success of the attack.

Successes dwindled as the Arras offensive continued, though the guns continued their support. In May 44th SB brought CB fire and direct bombardment onto Mericourt. But CB fire could work both ways: on 28/29 May the battery suffered two men wounded and cartridge dugouts destroyed by enemy guns.

=== Cambrai ===
44th Siege Battery continued its CB duties from June to October 1917, then between 12 and 18 November it was transported to join 90th HAG with Third Army, preparing for the Battle of Cambrai. The massed guns were kept silent until the surprise attack was launched in 20 November, but their positions and targets were accurately surveyed so that they could fire 'off the map' without need for prior registration. The 'super heavy' artillery group fired concentrations on the villages behind the lines, 44th SB firing on Havrincourt, Flesquières and Graincourt, major objectives for the attack. The attack was a great success, but its exploitation was disappointing. 44th Siege Bty switched to the command of 58th HAG on 25 November during the fighting for Bourlon Wood and then the German counter-attacks that wiped out the gains of Cambrai.

=== Battles of 1918 ===
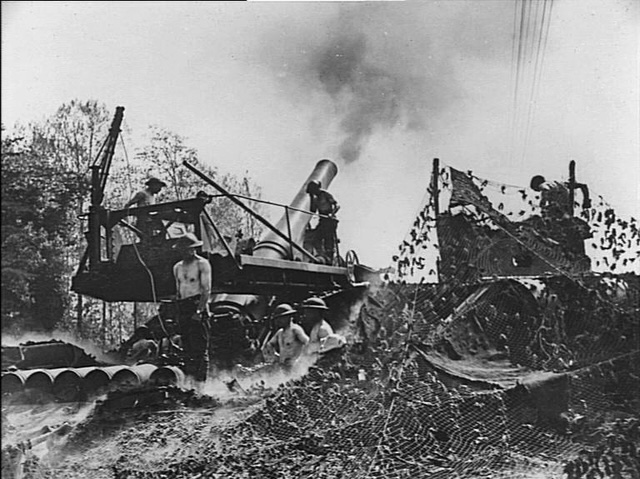
12-inch Howitzer Mark V firing, May 1918.

44th Siege Battery remained with Third Army during the winter of 1917–18, under 87th HAG from 15 December to 26 February 1918. In early 1918 the BEF changed its heavy artillery organisation. The HAGs became permanent RGA brigades, but the heaviest guns (including 44th SB's railway howitzers) remained unbrigaded under the direct command of Army HQs. The battery operated under Third, First, Fifth and Fourth Armies during the German spring offensive and Allied Hundred Days Offensive of 1918. As the fighting became more fluid the heaviest artillery became less useful, the railway guns in particular being dependent on the rate at which the RE could repair the destroyed lines in the battle zone. When hostilities ended in November, 44th SB was operating under Fifth Army.

== Postwar ==
Unusually for a New Army unit, 44th Siege Battery was not disbanded after the Armistice with Germany but continued in the postwar Regular Army. On 24 July 1919 it absorbed the Home Service details of No 84 Company RGA at Plymouth (the rest of the company having been converted into 130th Siege Battery in 1916 and disbanded in 1919). It was then converted into a medium artillery battery in XI Brigade, RGA. On 13 January 1920 it absorbed the former 60th Siege Battery and later that year the battery and brigade were redesignated as 16th Medium Battery in 4th Medium Brigade.

From 16 August 1921 16th Med Bty was considered to be the successor to 84 Company, RGA, originally formed in 1757, and on 13 November 1934 it was awarded the Honour Title 'Gibraltar 1779–83' in recognition of that company's service during the Great Siege of Gibraltar.

On 1 June 1924 the RGA was subsumed into the Royal Artillery (RA), and in May 1938 the brigade was redesignated 4th Medium Regiment, RA. Just before the outbreak of war in 1939 the RA's medium regiments were each reorganised into two large batteries, and 16th Bty served throughout World War II as part of the linked 14/16 Medium Bty. 4th Medium Rgt served in the Battle of France, Tunisian Campaign and Italian Campaign. 16 Battery was unlinked in the 1947 reorganisation of the RA, and resuscitated with new personnel to become 22 (Gibraltar 1779–83) Observation Battery ('Locating Battery' from 15 June 1951) in 52 Observation Regiment, later as an independent battery.

Today, 22 (Gibraltar 1779–83) Battery forms part of 32 Regiment Royal Artillery.

== External sources ==
- British Army units from 1945 on
- Mark Conrad, The British Army, 1914 (archive site)
- Royal Artillery 1939–1945 (archive site)
