= 35 Battery Royal Artillery =

- Active: 1765-1 April 2004, 16 July- present
- Country: United Kingdom
- Branch: Army
- Type: Artillery
- Equipment: MLRS

35 Battery Royal Artillery was part of the Royal Artillery. Its name is pronounced "three five", The battery is one of the sub-units of 39th Regiment Royal Artillery, part of the British Army. It was formed in 1765. It is the senior battery.

== Present day ==
The Battery Currently forms part of 39th Regiment Royal Artillery. Most of the Battery has deployed to Afghanistan in support of Op Herrick. Deployed with GMLRS providing essential support to the troops on the ground when it's needed. The rest of the Battery are back in Newcastle with the Regiment providing support to the Troops deployed. 35 Battery are the senior battery within 39 regiment RA as they were established in 1765, therefore they would lead any parade the Regiment was to undertake in. Although 35 Battery do not have a recognised battle honour thus not having a name they have been called "The Sabres" or "The Black Scimitars", this being a reference to the battery badge or shield.

== Recent history ==
35 Battery were the first Battery from 39 Regiment RA " The Welsh Gunners " to deploy to Iraq on Op Telic 7 where they re-rolled to STA ( surveillance and target acquisition ) to cover 5 Regiment RA commitment in 2005. From there the Battery has gone from strength to strength having returned from Op Telic 7 in October 2005 they then went on to get another first within their Regiment by becoming to first Battery to deploy to Afghanistan on Op Herrick 6 in 2007. As well as being the first Battery within their Regiment to deploy to Afghanistan they were also the first battery in the history of the Royal Artillery to fire the GMLRS (Guided Multiple Launch Rocket System). Having had a successful tour of Afghanistan on Op Herrick 6 the battery then had some down time and after a year began preparation to deploy again to Afghanistan on Op Herrick 10. This same rotation is still currently in use and the battery is now on its 3rd deployment of Afghanistan on Op Herrick 14, making it the first battery within 39 Regiment RA to deploy on 3 different tours to Afghanistan.

== History ==
=== 19th century ===
1869 - Battery becomes E Battery 20 Brigade

1877 - Battery becomes E Battery 6 Brigade, and returns to the UK, and then W Battery as the Brigades restructure.

1889 - Battery becomes 24 Field Battery

=== First World War ===
1914-1919 24 - Battery fight continuously through the 1st World War. ( Full details are recorded in 38 Brigade’s War Diaries.)

=== Post war ===
1922-1931 24 - Battery transferred to Nowshera in India where it absorbed 120 Battery.

1938 24 - Battery, back in the UK, mechanised by taking on Morris tractors, thereby ending the use of horses which had been used to pull the Battery’s guns since the Battery transferred Madras Foot Artillery to Light Field Artillery in 1855. At the end of the year the Battery amalgamated to become 21/24 Battery Royal Artillery.

=== Second World War ===
1939-1940 - 21/24 deployed to the Hebuterne-Bevry area as part of the British Expeditionary Force. From December 1939 to March 1940 the Battery was based at Auchy until it fought its way back to Dunkirk, embarking on 1–2 June after having to destroy its guns on 31 May 1940. 21/24 Battery initially took on an anti-invasion role in Devon but was re-equipped with 18-Pounder guns in October 1940.

1941 - After a period of intense reorganisation and retraining, there were sufficient men to form two separate batteries from 21/24 Battery. In September 1941 the Battery re-equipped with 25-Pounder Guns.

1942-1945 - On 22 July, 24 Field Battery transferred to India where it again undertook extensive retraining to become a jungle field battery equipped with 3.7” Howitzers. These were used in the Arakan offensive from 1944 to 1945.

=== Post Second World War ===
1946 - Immediately after the War the Battery was involved in internal security work against the Dacoits in Burma.

1947 - In January the Battery was posted to Hong Kong, where it became 35 Field Battery, part of 25 Field Regiment.

1950-1956 - The Battery was involved, with 25 Field Regiment, in supporting anti-terrorist operations in Malaya.

1957 - In November 1957 the Battery was deployed to the North East of Cyprus, known as the Panhandle. In this remote area they were used as infantry in the EOKA Campaign, until their withdrawal 5 months later, in April 1958.

1961-1965 35 - Battery served in BAOR with M44 Self-propelled guns.

1968-1970 35 - Battery again served in Hong Kong with 25-Pounders and 105mm Pack Howitzers.

1971- Within a year of its return from Hong Kong, 35 Battery deployed to Northern Ireland. It has subsequently served in the Province on 6 more occasions: in 1971 & 1973 (Belfast), in 1977 (Belfast City Centre), in 1979 (Ardoyne) and in 1987 & 1993 (Omagh and South Armagh).

1984 35 - Battery was placed into suspended animation on 1 April 1984.

1985-1992 - On 1 March 1985, 35 Battery was reformed as an Air Defence Battery in 22nd Air Defence Regiment based in Dortmund. Since then 35 Battery has been equipped with Rapier Air Defence System. Whilst based in Dortmund it deployed with Rapier to the Falkland Islands in 1986, and took on infantry roles in Northern Ireland, and Cyprus (1990, 1999, 2003).

1992-2004 - 35 Battery moved to Kirton in Lindsey, Lincolnshire. 35 Battery, along with 22nd Air Defence Regiment, was put into suspended animation on 1 April 2004.

2004 - On 16 July 2004, 35 Battery was reformed as a General Support Battery in 39th Regiment Royal Artillery based in Newcastle. It has now been equipped with the Multiple Launch Rocket System.

2005–2006 - Deployed on Op Telic 7, to southern Iraq in support of 7 Armd Bde.

2007- ongoing - Deployed on Op Herrick.
