= 56 (Olpherts) Battery Royal Artillery =

- Active: 2 June 1786 to present
- Country: United Kingdom
- Allegiance: Hon East India Coy (till 1858); United Kingdom (post 1858)
- Branch: British Army
- Type: Artillery
- Role: Deep Fires
- Size: Battery
- Equipment: MLRS
- Engagements: Indian Mutiny of 1857; World War I World War II

56 (Olpherts) Battery Royal Artillery was part of the Royal Artillery. Its name is pronounced "five six". The battery is one of the sub-units of 39th Regiment Royal Artillery, part of the British Army. It was formed in 1786.

== Present day ==
56 (Olpherts) Battery was placed in to suspended animation on 20 February 2015 following the disbandment of 39th Regiment Royal Artillery, which occurred on the same date. Up to this time, 56 (Olphert's) Battery was the Headquarters Battery of 39th Regiment Royal Artillery, providing the command element, and various other functions such as communications, training, logistics, and HR administration. It was the largest of the six batteries in the regiment.

== History ==
56 (Olpherts) Headquarters Battery RA has its origins in India as 5 Company, 3 Battalion, The Bengal Artillery, which was formed on 2 June 1786. The Indian mutiny of 1857 played a significant part in Battery history. During the first Relief of Lucknow, Captain William Olpherts or "Hellfire Jack" as he was known, won the Victoria Cross for conspicuous gallantry; he charged the enemy on horseback and captured two rebel guns that were pouring fire onto the flanks of the advancing forces. To commemorate this distinction, on 19 October 1966, the honour title "Olpherts" was awarded to 56 Battery RA.

=== 19th century ===
- 1793 - Siege of Pondicherry
- 1803 - Mahratta War
- 1805 - Siege of Bhurtpore
- 1814 - Nepal War
- 1825 - Second siege of Bhurtpore
- 1857 - The Indian Mutiny

=== First World War ===
During the First World War the Battery saw action at Mons, Hooge, Arras, Bethume, Le Cateau, Cambrai and Le Basse.

=== Second World War ===
In the Second World War the Battery was again involved in Malta and Italy.

=== Post Second World War ===
The Bty was a Special Weapons Battery for some years, and served in 36 Regt, along with 168 Bty and 60 Bty in Malta until 1957. It moved to Shoeburyness in Essex.

=== Post Cold War ===
In more recent times the Battery has served operationally in Northern Ireland, The Gulf conflict, Cyprus and Afghanistan.

In 1975 and 1977 the Battery did tours of NI based in Lurgan and then again in 1979/80 based in Belfast.

In 1982/3 the Battery relocated from 27 Field Regiment Royal Artillery based in Lippstadt to 39 Regiment based in Sennelager

In 1995 the Battery relocated from Sennelager to Albemarle Barracks, near Newcastle upon Tyne where it is situated today.

In the late 1990s, the Battery deployed to Northern Ireland with the Regiment three times; in July 1998 the Battery deployed to Northern Ireland as the Urban Reinforcement Battalion, June 2000 as Northern Ireland Battalion, and in 2002 as NIBAT 3 Belfast.

In 2006-7 the Battery formed the Support Battery for the 39 Regt RA deployment to Operation TOSCA as part of the UN Force in Cyprus (UNFICYP).

in 2007–2008, immediately following the end of the Op TOSCA tour, the Battery dropped the 'Headquarters' part of its title and formed itself as an equipment battery in readiness to deploy to Op HERRICK 7 in support of 52 Inf Bde in September 2007. It was equipped with two troops of M270-B1 MLRS launchers firing the M31 G-MLRS (Unitary) Rocket. The most notable success was its firing of the opening salvo as a combined force of Coalition and Afghan Forces captured the town of Musa Qa L'Eh in Northern Helmand in early December 2007. On return to the UK at the end of the highly successful tour, it returned to its conventional role providing the command and control element to 39 Regt RA. Its soldiers consistently supported the enduring deployment of other batteries in 39 Regt RA.

It was until disbandment the headquarters battery of 39 Regt RA.
