= Operation Harekate Yolo =

2007 operation of the War in Afghanistan

- Part of the War in Afghanistan (2001–2021)
Date	October–November 2007
Location	North-west Afghanistan
Result	Tactical Coalition victory

Belligerents
Coalition: Germany; Islamic Republic of Afghanistan; Norway; Italy; Spain; Hungary; Latvia	(Afghanistan) Taliban

Commanders and leaders
(Germany) Brig. Gen. D. Warnecke (Islamic Republic of Afghanistan) General Ali Murat	Unknown

Strength
(Germany) 460 (Afghanistan) 1,300 (Norway) 260	Unknown

Casualties and losses
1 killed (after battle)	59–79 killed

Operation Harekate Yolo (Persian for front straightening) was a two-part military operation involving NATO, ISAF and Afghanistan government forces against the Taliban as part of the War in Afghanistan.

In late October 2007, Regional Command North along with the Afghan National Army and Afghan National Security Forces launched its first major operation against hostile forces in the northern provinces. It was composed of about 2000 coalition troops from Afghanistan, Norway, Germany, Italy, Spain and Hungary; and its purpose was to oust Taliban militants from several locations in the Ghowrmach district, Faryab Province, and Faizabad, Badakhshan Province, wherefrom they had operated and caused a number of ANA and coalition casualties since the early summer of 2007. The offensive followed threats of senior Taliban officers to expand the insurgency to the relatively peaceful north.

Operation Harekate Yolo I was launched in late October and was composed of about 160 German paratroopers and 400 Afghan National Army soldiers. Its aim was to identify Taliban hideouts in the Badakhshan province and to drive the militants out of the district.

The second stage of the offensive, Operation Harekate Yolo II, was launched on November 1. As announced by ISAF RC North commanding general Brig. Gen. D. Warnecke, ISAF forces detained several suspected insurgents on the first day of the operation, accused of having organized several attacks on ISAF troops, including a suicide attack which seriously injured three Germans in October. It was composed of about 900 members of the Afghan National Army, 260 Norwegian Army troops from 2nd Battalion/Brig. N and Kystjegerkommandoen, 300 German troops, several dozen Italian troops, and some Hungarian and Spanish troops. Intelligence gathered by reconnaissance planes indicated the presence of about 300 Taliban forces in Ghowrmach.

Between November 1, and November 6, Norwegian and German ISAF forces along with Afghan security forces battled Taliban insurgents in the Ghowrmach district, Northwest Afghanistan, in what was described as "active warfare" by the Norwegian Department of Defense. The insurgents suffered a number of casualties while no casualties were reported for ISAF/Afghan National Army force. The exact death toll had not yet been disclosed as of November 9, but according to Norwegian news reports "between 45 and 65 insurgents" were killed in action. The German Ministry of Defense verified a further 14 hostile fighters killed in action. The fighting erupted on November 3 and intensified through November 6. NATO aircraft provided Close Air Support during the operation, which ended on November 6/7.

During the mission, a Norwegian sniper with the 2nd Battalion hit one of the Taliban insurgents from a distance of 1,380 meters on the first shot, using a Barret M82A1. Another Norwegian sniper team shot and killed a Taliban insurgent from a distance of approximately 2,010 meters, although not a first round hit. Several targets were engaged with the Barrett, some of them almost 3000 meters away.

In the aftermath, a Norwegian soldier was killed in an IED attack in Maimana on November 8. ANA's 209th Corps took over control of the district on the same day.

Subsequent to the battle, a number of soldiers from the Norwegian Military Observer Team Navy (unit made up of soldiers from the Kystjegerkommandoen) were awarded the US Army's Commendation Medal for their efforts in expelling the Taliban from the Ghowrmach district.

Operation Harekate Yolo was the combat debut of the CV90 armoured vehicle used by the Norwegian Army.

== See also ==
- Operation Karez
