= Kystjegerkommandoen =

Coastal Ranger Command
- Kystjegerkommandoen
- Active: 2001- current
- Country: Norway
- Branch: Royal Norwegian Navy
- Type: Commando
- Size: 130-140 Operators
- Part of: Royal Norwegian Navy
- Garrison/HQ: Harstad
- Engagements: Operation Enduring Freedom; Operation Harekate Yolo; ISAF; Destruction of Syria's chemical weapons Resolute Support Mission; Operation Active Endeavour
- Decorations: United States Commendation Medal

Kystjegerkommandoen (English: "Coastal Ranger Command", or KJK) is a unit in the Royal Norwegian Navy. KJK is a marine commando unit trained to operate in littoral combat theatres, filling the role of marines and coastal artillery.

The unit consists of coastal rangers and vessel operators. Its home base is at Trondenes in Harstad Municipality in North Norway.

== Background and history ==
Beyond the 1990s and up to the turn of the millennium, there was a widespread perception that the Coast Artillery's coastal forts had played their role, as the experiences from the Gulf War in 1990–1991 showed that stationary installations were very vulnerable to precision-guided weapons. The dissolution of the Soviet Union also reduced the threat of a naval invasion against large parts of the coast, thereby reducing the utility of large stationary coastal forts.

At this time, the Norwegian Armed Forces moved away from territorial defense to more focus on international missions, and it was considered to create a marine infantry unit modeled after the Netherlands Marine Corps and Royal Marines. But it was seen as more relevant for Norwegian conditions to look at the Swedish coastal ranger companies.

=== Afghanistan (2005–2012) ===
In 2005, KJK sent its first independent contributions to ISAF as the Military Observer Team (MOT) to the Provincial Reconstruction Team Meymaneh. They also carried out several operations together with Marinejegerkommandoen (MJK) (Norwegian special operations unit). During this time, KJK established its position as a professional department, gaining a high reputation among allied departments and the Norwegian command in Mazar-e Sharif.

=== Risk of disbandment (2013–2021) ===
From December 2013 to July 2014, KJK participated with a significant contribution to the operation to remove chemical weapons from Syria (RECSYR).

In the autumn of 2014, then Chief of Defense Haakon Bruun-Hanssen presented his professional military advice to the Norwegian government where it was recommended that the unit be moved to Haakonsvern Naval Base in Bergen. There, the unit would continue in a boarding and force protection capacity in support of surface vessels, unless the Norwegian Armed Forces were awarded an increased financial framework. In the government's subsequent proposal for a long-term plan, it was stated that they would proceed with this recommendation. Several interest organisations, together with union representatives from KJK and MJK, then started lobbying to try to get the departments merged in an attempt to keep KJK's capacities in Northern Norway.

The opposition in the Norwegian parliament disagreed with the closure, which led to a defense settlement in November 2016 where it was decided that the unit would continue in its current form.

In 2018, the government considered a proposal to incorporate KJK into the Norwegian Special Operations Command, but this was not taken forward as the Norwegian navy's boarding capacity would disappear. However, cooperation between the units, and KJK's support for the special forces, was to continue as before.

=== Introduction of new capacities and training of Ukrainians (2022-) ===
In the context of the fact that Naval Strike Missile had been developed to gain land targeting capacity, it was decided that KJK should gain the capacity to acquire target data outside the frigates' and corvettes' own sensor range using drones (UAV). The unit set itself the goal in 2022 of becoming a leader in maritime drone operations.

In September 2023, it became known that the unit has trained Ukrainian marines to be able to operate covertly in coastal areas, including tactical movement and infiltration, covert surveillance, reconnaissance and offensive operations. This is part of a coordinated project with the British Royal Marines and the Netherlands Marine Corps.

== Role ==
KJK operatives are trained to be highly mobile in the littoral environment, using the Combat Boat 90, RHIBs and occasionally helicopters. The CB90 is capable of landing troops directly on the shore. Their main weapon against enemy vessels is the AGM-114 Hellfire missile, using a blast-fragmentation warhead. This will be carried in the CB90, and launched from ashore, taking advantage of Norway's numerous islands and rugged coast.

KJK's main task is thus to carry out intelligence gathering in various contexts and situations. KJK's operational portfolio is largely similar to the Norwegian Army's Intelligence Battalion and artillery rangers, and after long experience from Afghanistan, they have valuable weight in other spectrums of the warfare domain other than the coastal zone.

The units must be able to document and analyze the information obtained. Furthermore, the units must be able to direct fire from various platforms (JTAC), i.e. contribute to combating high-value targets.

Coastal rangers operates in small groups and is equipped and trained to operate alone over time in areas controlled by an enemy.

The soldiers are professionals and, based on their competence, they can be used for other tasks that are not necessarily covered within the maritime ISTAR concept. This is reflected i.a. through the unit's contribution in Afghanistan.

== Allied training ==
KJK train regularly with allied partners like USMC, Royal Marines and Netherlands Marine Corps.

== Honors and losses ==
In November 2007, a KJK unit assisted a force of Afghan soldiers and their 14 American mentors as they came under a Taliban ambush in Badghis province in Afghanistan. When the Afghan soldiers and their American mentors were headed into an area to apprehend Taliban soldiers and leaders, they were unaware that they were headed into an ambush. The Norwegian soldiers observed this and were able to get through to their American allies on radio and warn them about the danger ahead, guiding them so they could fight themselves out of the situation. The Norwegian soldiers involved received the Army Commendation Medal for their efforts.

In November 2007, KJK took part in Operation Front Straightening to push Taliban out of the Faryab province.

The unit lost 3 men on June 27, 2010 when a roadside bomb (IED) exploded under their vehicle on a mission in the Almar District, Afghanistan.

== Selection and training ==
KJK has an annual selection, and anyone who meets the requirements can apply for admission. The basic education is based on volunteering and extends over one year. The education consists of an initial selection, a selection period over five weeks and a ten-month specialist training.

=== Initial selection ===
Prior to the coastal ranger training, an initial selection is carried out by the Norwegian Armed Forces' common recruitment and selection (Forsvarets opptak og seleksjon). Applicants who satisfy the criteria are invited to an initial selection at Trondenes Fort in Harstad.

During the initial selection, tests are carried out and the applicant's medical and physical fitness is assessed. In addition, there is a field period where the applicant's physical and mental performance is tested.

=== Selection period ===
The five weeks ensure that the aspirants have the personal qualities that the education requires.

The period is characterized by high activity and demanding military training in a coastal environment. The selection is mainly carried out under field conditions, in the coastal zone and at sea, and ends with a milestone exercise.

=== Specialization ===
Professional training as a coastal ranger starts with a maritime part, with basic training in the use of RHIBs, deployment with combat boat 90, surface swimming and survival in a coastal environment.

A maritime patrol course is then carried out with field disciplines, combat techniques, marksmanship training, combat casualty care, signals and a number of field exercises in a coastal environment to ensure the quality of the education level on an ongoing basis.

The last part of the professional training is a course in maritime ranger operations which ends with an exercise that checks that the level of education is satisfactory. The coastal ranger aspirants are then transferred to an operational squad in the Coastal Ranger Command.

== See also ==
- Marinejegerkommandoen - Naval Special Operations Command
- Minedykkerkommandoen - Naval EOD Command
