= 32nd Regiment Royal Artillery =

British Army artillery regiment

- Active: 1939 – present
- Country: United Kingdom
- Branch: British Army
- Role: Mini-Unmanned Aerial Systems (MUAS)
- Size: Regiment; 398 personnel
- Part of: Joint Aviation Command
- Garrison/HQ: Roberts Barracks
- Nickname: The Wessex Gunners
- Website: 32 Regiment Royal Artillery

32 Regiment Royal Artillery (The Wessex Gunners) is a regiment in the Royal Artillery, part of the British Army and is the only Royal Artillery unit equipped with miniature unmanned aerial systems.

== History ==
The regiment has its origins in 7th Medium Brigade, which was raised in 1927, equipped with 60 Pounders and 6" Howitzers. It evolved into 7th Medium Regiment and served throughout the Second World War.

In 1947, the 32nd Regimental Headquarters (RHQ) was retitled as the 45th Field Regiment and the 7th Medium Regiment RHQ was retitled as the 32nd.

In 1966, the regiment became a Heavy Regiment with M107 175 mm self-propelled guns. In 1972, it became a light Regiment, equipped with 105mm Light Guns; then, in 1978, a Guided Missile Regiment equipped with Swingfire anti-tank missile. In 1985, it became a heavy regiment again with M107 guns based in Dortmund. During the Gulf War, the regiment was equipped with M110 self-propelled 203 mm howitzers and served as part of the Divisional Artillery Group supporting the 1st Armoured Division.

In December 2016, it was announced that the regiment would be disbanded and its personnel redistributed to other parts of the British Army. In the British Army's Soldier Magazine, October 2020 edition, it was confirmed the regiment would not disband but would continue to support the field army in the Mini-Unmanned Aerial Systems (MUAS) support role, using the Puma and Wasp AE (All Environment) mini unmanned air system.

As part of the Future Soldier Programme, the regiment gained an addition MUAS battery in 2023: 42 (Alem Hamza) Battery. The regiment were also equipped with the Stalker VXE30 and Indago 4 UAS from 2024 under the Army's TIQUILA Programme.

In May 2024, the regiment resubordinated to the command of Joint Aviation Command, operating under the same organisation as battlefield helicopters.

== Batteries ==
The regiment currently comprises the following batteries:

- 18 (Quebec 1759) Battery Royal Artillery – formed 1759
- 21 (Gibraltar 1779–83) Air Assault Battery – supporting 16 Air Assault Brigade, formed 1756
- 22 (Gibraltar 1779–83) Battery Royal Artillery – formed 1756
- 42 (Alem Hamza) Battery Royal Artillery – formed 1716
- 46 (Talavera) Battery Royal Artillery – Headquarters battery, formed 1778
