= Coalition casualties in Afghanistan =

Overview of war casualties

Coalition fatalities per month from the start of the war until 2015

Throughout the War in Afghanistan, there had been 3,621 coalition deaths in Afghanistan as part of the coalition operations (Operation Enduring Freedom and ISAF) since the invasion in 2001. 3,485 of these deaths occurred during NATO's combat operations which ended in 2014, while the remainder of deaths happened afterwards until 2021.However there are some reports of greater estimates which range up to 7,500+ total deaths.

In addition to these numbers were the deaths of 18 CIA operatives, a number of American deaths that occurred in other countries from injuries sustained in the theater, and 62 Spanish soldiers returning from Afghanistan who died in Turkey on 26 May 2003, when their plane crashed.

Number of foreign soldiers killed in Afghanistan
Country	Deaths	Population (millions) (Note: As of 2010)	Deaths per million
USA	2461^{*}	309	7.96
UK	457	63	7.25
Canada	159^{*}	34	4.68
France	90	63	1.43
Germany	62	82	0.76
Italy	53	60	0.88
Poland	44	38	1.16
Denmark	44	5.5	8.00
Australia	41	22	1.86
Spain	35^{*}	46	0.76
Georgia	32	3.8	8.42
Romania	27	21.3	1.27
Netherlands	25	16.6	1.51
Turkey	15	73.7	0.20
Czech Republic	14	10.5	1.33
New Zealand	10	4.4	2.27
Norway	10	4.9	2.04
Estonia	9	1.3	6.92
Hungary	7	10	0.70
Sweden	5	9.4	0.53
Latvia	4	2.2	1.82
Slovakia	3	5.4	0.56
Finland	2	5.4	0.37
Jordan	2	6.1	0.33
Portugal	2	10.6	0.19
South Korea	2	49.5	0.04
Albania	2	2.8	0.71
Belgium	1	11	0.09
Bulgaria	1	7.5	0.13
Croatia	1	4.4	0.23
Lithuania	1	3.2	0.31
Montenegro	1	0.62	1.61
Total	3621		

During the first five years of the war, the vast majority of coalition deaths were American, but between 2006 and 2011, a significant proportion were amongst other nations, particularly the United Kingdom and Canada which had been assigned responsibility for the flashpoint provinces of Helmand and Kandahar, respectively. This is because in 2006, ISAF expanded its jurisdiction to the southern regions of Afghanistan which were previously under the direct authority of the U.S. military. The UK in particular suffered a high number of deaths relative to other countries, having been in charge of the highly hazardous Helmand region; both Denmark and Estonia, which were part of the British-led Task Force Helmand, also suffered high death rates, with Danish troops having the highest death rate of any country in the war as of 2009. In later years, Georgia became the largest non-NATO contributor to Afghanistan and paid a heavy toll with the highest casualty rate, with all of the 32 deaths occurring in Helmand.

As Robert Gates pointed out on 10 June 2011, in his "last policy speech" as U.S. Secretary of Defense, "more than 850 troops from non-U.S. NATO members have made the ultimate sacrifice in Afghanistan. For many allied nations these were the first military casualties they have taken since the end of the Second World War." Additionally, there have been 95 fatalities among troops from the non-NATO contributors to the coalition (Georgia, Australia, Sweden, New Zealand, Finland, Jordan, South Korea and Albania). By 2015 with the passing of operations to the Afghan National Security Forces, the number of coalition casualties dropped, however, the Afghan forces suffered as many as 45,000 fatalities between 2014 and 2019, and an estimated 69,095 total by the end of the war in August 2021.

== Cause of the war ==
As time went on and the insurgency was widening, the war became increasingly deadly. With 711 Operation Enduring Freedom and ISAF deaths, 2010 was the deadliest year for foreign military troops since the U.S. invasion in 2001, continuing the trend that occurred every year since 2003.

In 2009, there were 7,228 improvised explosive device (IED) attacks in Afghanistan, a 120% increase over 2008, and a record for the war. Of the 512 foreign soldiers killed in 2009, 448 were killed in action. 280 of those were killed by IEDs. In 2010, IED attacks in Afghanistan wounded 3,366 U.S. soldiers, which is nearly 60% of the total IED-wounded since the start of the war. Of the 711 foreign soldiers killed in 2010, 630 were killed in action. 368 of those were killed by IEDs, which is around 36% of the total IED-killed since the start of the war to date. Insurgents planted 14,661 IEDs in 2010, a 62% increase over the previous year.

== Details regarding the casualties ==
Local Afghans pay respect during the memorial service in honor of Albanian Army Capt. Feti Vogli

=== Albania ===
There has been one recorded fatality among Albanian troops. Captain Feti Vogli was killed in Herat in February 2012, another soldier was wounded A second Albanian soldier, Major Xhevahir Jazaj, died from unspecified causes on January 19, 2021.

=== Australia ===
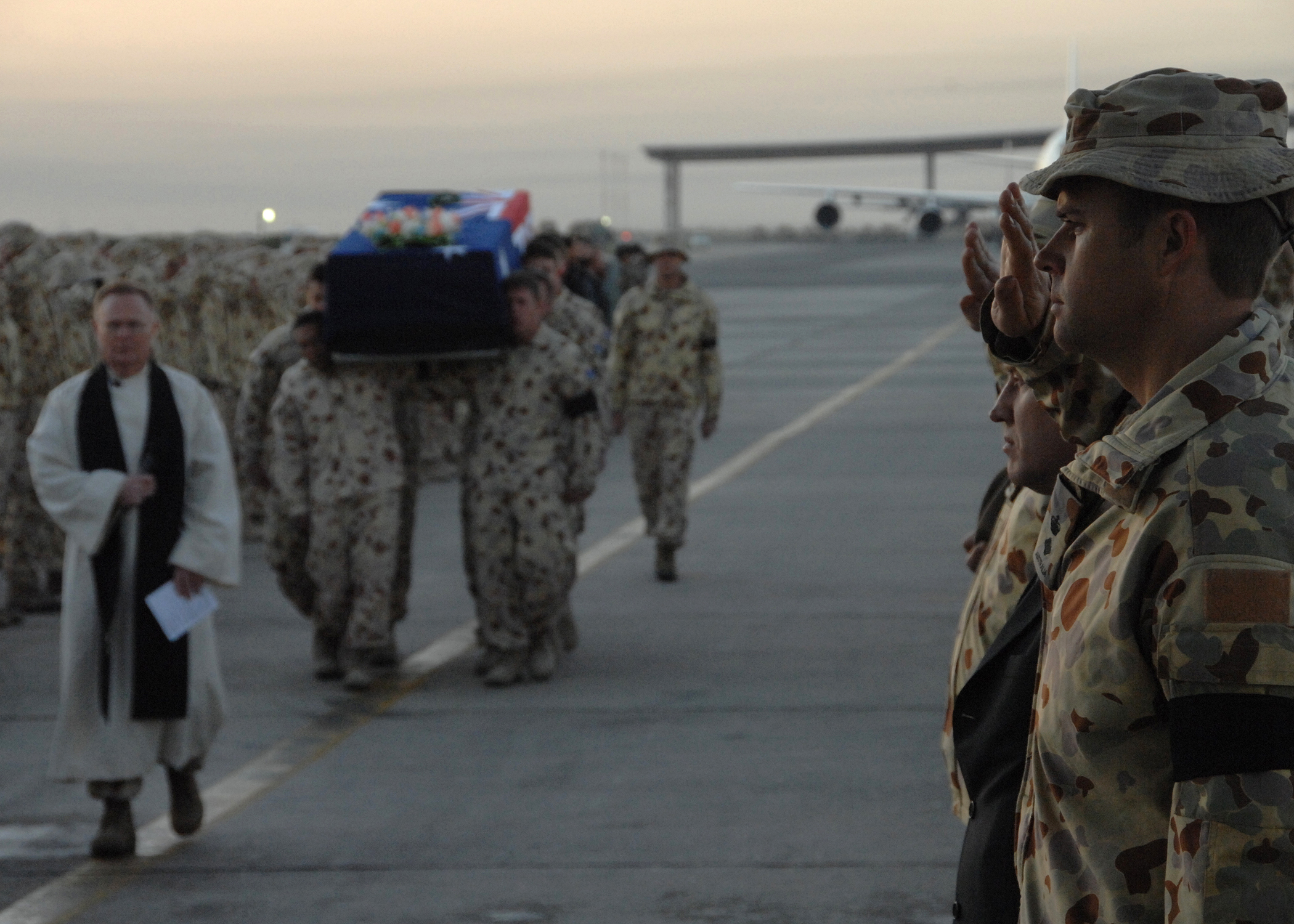
The repatriation ceremony for Australian Private Gregory Michael Sher, killed in southern Afghanistan in 2009, making him the first Australian Defence Force soldier to be killed by indirect fire since 1992.

The Australian forces in Afghanistan have suffered 41 fatalities (34 in action) 261 soldiers have been wounded.

One Australian civilian (David Savage, formerly a senior officer with the Department of Foreign Affairs working as an adviser to AusAID) was wounded in Afghanistan.

=== Belgium ===
One Belgian soldier died of meningitis while serving in Afghanistan, 14 soldiers have been wounded in action.

=== Bulgaria ===
One Bulgarian soldier died in Afghanistan. At least 7 Bulgarian soldiers have been wounded in Afghanistan.

=== Canada ===
Canada's role in Afghanistan, consisting of operations against the Taliban and other insurgents in southern Afghanistan (Kandahar Province), has resulted in the largest number of fatal casualties for any single Canadian military mission since the Korean War. A total of 159^{*} members of the Canadian Forces died in Afghanistan between February 2002 and 29 October 2011. Of these, 132 were due to enemy actions, including 97 due to IEDs or landmines, 22 due to RPG, small arms or mortar fire, and 13 due to suicide bomb attacks. Another six Canadian soldiers died due to friendly fire from their American allies while conducting combat training operations. An additional 19 Canadian soldiers have died in Afghanistan as a result of accidents or non-combat circumstances; 6 in vehicle accidents, 3 unspecified non-combat-related deaths, 3 suicide deaths, 2 in a helicopter crash, 2 from accidental falls, 2 from accidental gunshots and 1 death from an illness. 635 soldiers had been wounded in action and 1,412 received non-battle injuries since April 2002, up to their withdrawal in March 2014.

=== Croatia ===
Since November 2006, at least 9 Croatian soldiers have been wounded and injured in Afghanistan On 24 July 2019 three Croatian soldiers were wounded in a motorcycle suicide attack. One of the wounded soon succumbed to head injuries while the other two are stable with serious arm and leg trauma. LCpl Josip Briški (1992.-2019.) is the first Croatian soldier to die in Afghanistan.

=== Czech Republic ===
14 Czech soldiers were killed in Afghanistan and at least 26 others were wounded.

=== Denmark ===
Denmark, a NATO member, sent 9,500 personnel to Afghanistan between January 2002 and 1 July 2013. They were mostly stationed in Helmand province as part of NATO's International Security and Assistance Force (ISAF).

Denmark's first three deaths were the result of an accident during the disposal of a Soviet-era anti-aircraft missile in 2002. With a new mandate issued by the Danish parliament in 2006, Danish military operations transformed from relatively safe non-combat operations in the centre of the country to combat operations alongside the British contingent in the violent southern Helmand province. 37 soldiers were killed in various hostile engagements or as a result of friendly fire, and 7 were killed in non-combat related incidents, bringing the number of Danish fatalities to 44, being the highest loss per capita within the coalition forces. In addition, 214 soldiers were wounded in action and injured.

In addition, one Danish EUPOL civilian staff member was killed in 2014 in Kabul.

=== Estonia ===
Nine Estonian soldiers have died in Afghanistan: eight have been killed in action and one in an accident, 92 soldiers have been wounded in action.

=== Finland ===
Two Finnish soldiers were killed by hostile action in Afghanistan, and at least 11 soldiers have been wounded.

=== France ===
A total of 90 French soldiers died. 71 soldiers have been killed in action, of the 19 others: seven have died in vehicle accidents, one in a helicopter crash, two committed suicide, two have drowned, one was killed by a lightning strike, two died from a non-hostile gunshot wound, one died by friendly fire, one died in an accidental explosion, and one died of unknown causes. According to the website Mémoire des Hommes (website of the French Ministry of Armed Forces), 52 soldiers were killed in action, 7 died of accident and 31 died from unspecified causes. Among these 90 casualties, 71 were recognized Mort pour la France and 19 were recognized Non Mort pour la France.

See also: French forces casualties in Afghanistan.

The largest number of soldiers killed was when French troops were ambushed in the area of Sirobi, some 50 km (31 mi) east of Kabul, in August 2008. Ten French troops were killed and a further 21 wounded in the attack – the heaviest loss of troops France has suffered since deploying to Afghanistan in 2001. A total of 44 French soldiers were killed in Tagab district, by far the deadliest area patrolled by the force and a stronghold of the Taliban and other insurgent groups.

An additional 725 French soldiers were wounded and injured in Afghanistan.

=== Georgia ===
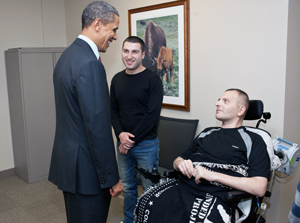
U.S. President Barack Obama visiting a wounded Georgian LTC Alexandre Tugushi at Walter Reed National Military Medical Center.

Georgia, was the largest non-NATO contributor to the war effort, losing 32 soldiers in Afghanistan with 435 wounded since 2010. The first Georgian fatality occurred on 5 September 2010, when 28 years old Lieutenant Mukhran Shukvani was killed in a sniper attack and Corporal Alexandre Gitolendia was seriously wounded. Four more Georgian soldiers were killed by a landmine during combat operations on 1 October 2010, in Helmand. On 21 February 2011 Georgia lost another soldier, George Avaliani, while two others were wounded. On 14 March 2011, one of the two injured died in a hospital in Germany and on 27 May 2011 another soldier died. On 21 June a ninth Georgian soldier died of injuries sustained during an attack. On 31 August 2011, junior sergeant Rezo Beridze was killed by sniper fire during a patrol mission, Corporal Besarion Naniashvili died on 30 December 2011, 6 January 2012 Corporal Shalva Pailodze was killed, on 22 February 2012 Georgian Ministry of Defense announced death of Corporals – Valerian Beraia, Ruslan Meladze and Paata Kacharava, their combat vehicle exploded following an insurgent attack. Sergeant Valerian Khujadze exploded on an IED (Improvised Explosive Device) and died from the injuries. Corporal Givi Pantsuala, wounded in January 2012 succumbed to his wounds at a hospital in Gori, Georgia on 28 July 2012, bringing the total number of the Georgian military death toll to 18. On 29 December 2012, Defense Minister of Georgia Alasania held a special briefing regarding to the death of Georgian Sergeant Giorgi Kikadze who missed in Afghanistan on 19 December. On 13 May 2013, 3 Georgian soldiers: Cpl Alexander Kvitsinadze, Lower Sergeant Zviad Davitadze and Cpl Vladimer Shanava were killed after a suicide attack on 42nd Battalion military base. 27 more were wounded. On 6 June 2013 a truck bomb hitting the Georgian military base killed 7 and injured 9 servicemen, bringing the total of casualties to 29.

=== Germany ===
A total of 59 German ISAF soldiers and 3 EUPOL officers have been killed and 245 service personnel have been wounded in action.

=== Greece ===
In 2005, two Greek soldiers were injured in Kabul, Afghanistan following the detonation of an improvised explosive device.

=== Hungary ===
Seven Hungarians died in Afghanistan. Two EOD members were killed by IEDs. Two were killed in a convoy attack by the Taliban. Two died in a vehicle accident during a convoy-escort task. One died because of a heart attack.

Also, 14 Hungarian soldiers have been wounded in action.

=== Iceland ===
Three Icelandic personnel were wounded in an attack in 2004.

=== Italy ===
A total of 53 Italians have died in Afghanistan: 34 killed in action, nine died in vehicle accidents, two of heart attacks, one due to an accidental weapon discharge, four of illness, one in an accidental airplane crash and one committed suicide. Of the 34 who died in combat, one had died from injuries sustained a week before. The soldier had been captured and was injured in the raid to rescue him. One other Italian soldier was captured but he was rescued safely.

=== Jordan ===
A member of the Jordanian intelligence agency Dairat al-Mukhabarat al-Ammah was killed in the Forward Operating Base Chapman attack. Also, a Jordanian soldier was killed and three were wounded while escorting a humanitarian convoy in Logar province on 22 May 2011.

=== Latvia ===
Three Latvian soldiers (Edgars Ozoliņš, Voldemārs Anševics and Andrejs Merkuševs) were killed in Afghanistan, another one (corporal Dāvis Baltābols) died in German military hospital in 2009 and at least 11 soldiers have been wounded.

=== Lithuania ===
One Lithuanian soldier, Arūnas Jarmalavičius, was killed in Afghanistan, and at least 13 have been wounded.

=== North Macedonia ===
At least 4 Macedonian soldiers have been wounded in Afghanistan.

=== Montenegro ===
One soldier (Mijailo Perišić) died in Afghanistan after suffering a heart attack.

=== Netherlands ===
A total of 25 Dutch servicemen were killed in Afghanistan. The first two Dutch fatalities were soldiers killed in an accidental helicopter crash in 2006. Since then, one pilot died in a non-hostile F-16 crash, and one soldier committed suicide at Multi National Base Tarin Kot (Kamp Holland). In 2007, one soldier was accidentally killed when a Patria armoured vehicle overturned at a river crossing near Tarin Kowt in Uruzgan. After that 19 soldiers were killed in action between 2007 and 2010. Finally, the last soldier to die was from an illness a month before the contingent withdrew from the country in December 2010. 140 soldiers were wounded in action.

=== New Zealand ===
Ten New Zealand Defence Force soldiers have died in Afghanistan, most while carrying out their duties as part of the Provincial Reconstruction Team in the Bamyan Province. Lieutenant Timothy O'Donnell was killed when his convoy was ambushed on a stretch of road in the Kahmard District of the province. Private Kirifi Mila died when the Humvee in which he was travelling accidentally rolled down a 30-metre cliff. Corporal Doug Grant of the New Zealand SAS was killed in Kabul on 18 August 2011. Lance Corporal Leon Smith, also of the New Zealand SAS, was killed on 27 September 2011 in Wardak province. On 3 April 2012, Corporal Douglas Hughes died in Bamyan Province. On 5 August 2012, Lance Corporals Rory Malone and Pralli Durrer, were killed in Bamyan Province in a firefight with insurgents. Most recently, Lance Corporal Jacinda Baker, Private Richard Harris, and Corporal Luke Tamatea were killed on 19 August 2012 when their vehicle was hit by an IED. Lance Corporal Baker is New Zealand's first female casualty in a combat role since women were allowed to serve on the frontline in 2000. In November 2012, New Zealand Prime Minister John Key confirmed a coalition airstrike had killed Abdullah Kalta, the Taliban commander believed responsible for the deaths of O'Donnell, Baker, Harris and Tamatea.

=== Norway ===
10 Norwegian ISAF soldiers have been killed in action in Afghanistan.

At least 940 soldiers have been wounded in action or injured in accidents

In addition, one Norwegian military advisor (Lt. Col. Siri Skare) was killed in the 2011 Mazar-i-Sharif attack.

=== Poland ===
44 Polish soldiers (including a military civilian medic and one JW GROM member) have been killed. 41 in action, 2 died due to a non-combat cause and 1 died in a vehicle accident. At least 231 soldiers and civilian ISAF members have been wounded in action.

=== Portugal ===
Portugal sent at least 196 soldiers to Afghanistan as part of the International Security Assistance Force, one duty of which was guarding the airport in Kabul.

Two Portuguese soldiers have been killed in action in Afghanistan and at least 10 have been wounded.

=== Romania ===
27 Romanian soldiers have been killed in action in Afghanistan, while at least 131 soldiers have been wounded in action.

=== Slovakia ===
3 Slovak soldiers have been killed in Afghanistan, at least 8 soldiers have been wounded.

=== Slovenia ===
At least 2 Slovenian soldiers and one Slovenian civilian expert were injured.

=== South Korea ===
A South Korean officer (Captain Kim Hyo-sung, 33) was accidentally shot by a fellow officer (Major Lee Kyu-sang, 37) while in a row for not following an order to speak quietly on the telephone. Another South Korean soldier, Sergeant Yoon Jang-ho, was killed in a suicide bomb attack at Bagram Air Base.

=== Spain ===
Of the 35 Spanish deaths, 17 died in August 2005 when the Eurocopter Cougar helicopter they were travelling in crashed, 13 were killed in separate attacks by insurgents, two died from natural causes, and two died in vehicle accidents. Another 62 died in a 2003 Yak-42 plane crash in Turkey on their way back to Spain from Afghanistan.

=== Sweden ===
Five Swedish soldiers have been killed in action since 2005. Three in two separate IED incidents and two in an ambush by an ANP uniform wearing insurgent. At least 13 soldiers were wounded

Also, two local translators working with the Swedish PRT have been killed.

=== Turkey ===
The Turkish Army suffered its first deaths on 14 July 2009, when two soldiers were killed in a road traffic accident in Faryab province, between Mazar-i Sharif and Kabul. One of the two killed was the commander of the Turkish contingent of ISAF troops in Afghanistan. On 16 March 2012, 12 Turkish soldiers were killed when their helicopter crashed into a house in Kabul. On 26 February 2015, one Turkish soldier was killed and another wounded in a suicide-bombing in Kabul.

=== United Kingdom ===
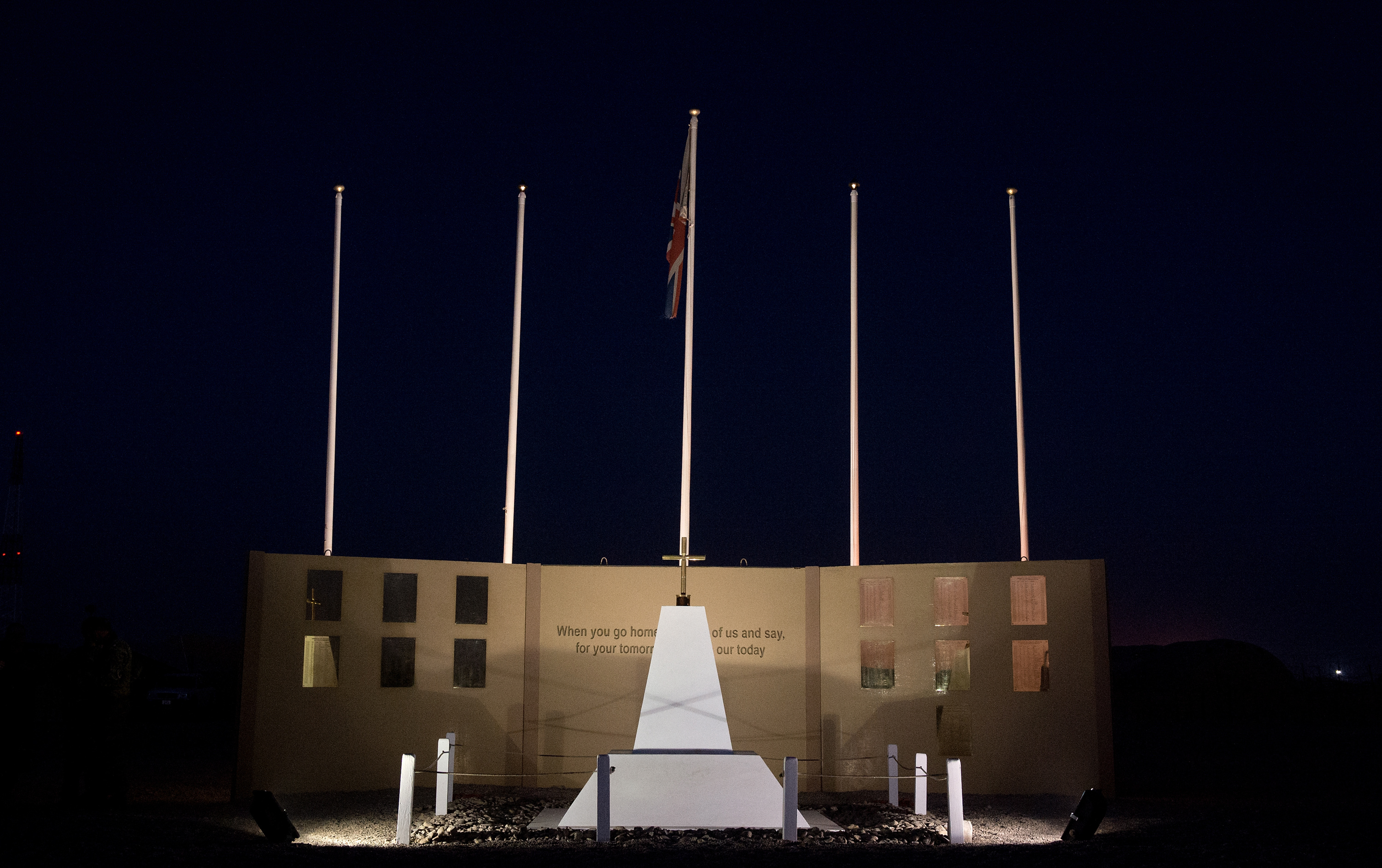
Memorial Wall at Camp Bastion

The British forces suffered 457 fatalities and 2,188 wounded in action, another 5,251 have suffered from disease or non-battle injuries. Of these, 404 soldiers were killed as a result of hostile action, while 49 are known to have died either as a result of illness, non-combat injuries or accidents, or have not yet officially been assigned a cause of death pending the outcome of an investigation. The vast majority of fatalities took place after the redeployment of British forces to the Taliban stronghold of Helmand province in 2006, as only five men died between April 2002 and early March 2006.

=== United States ===
From the start of U.S. military operations through the wars end, nearly 2,400 American service members were killed in Afghanistan. Additionally, 20,719 U.S. service members were wounded in hostile action, according to the Department of Defense.

Of the United States deaths, 1,922 died in hostile action. Included in these numbers are 18 CIA operatives that were killed in Afghanistan: 16 by hostile fire, including seven in a suicide bomb attack on a military base, one in an accident and one committed suicide. The independent website iCasualties put the total number of U.S. deaths at 2,355. This number is by 9 higher than the Department of Defense's tally which is 2,346, when including the intelligence operatives.

== War related out-of-country deaths ==
Coalition deaths in other countries as the result of the war

US: 59
Spain: 62
Canada: 1

TOTAL: 122

In addition to the 2,313 American deaths in Afghanistan, Pakistan and Uzbekistan, 59 U.S. soldiers died in Kuwait, Bahrain, Saudi Arabia, Qatar, United Arab Emirates, Kyrgyzstan, Germany, Oman, Jordan, Turkey, Yemen, the Arabian sea, the Persian Gulf, the Red Sea and the Mediterranean, while supporting operations in Afghanistan. Among them are also a Marine, a civilian DoD employee, two military airmen and a special forces member who were killed in action while supporting Operation Enduring Freedom.

62 Spanish soldiers died in a Yak-42 plane crash in Turkey on their way back to Spain from Afghanistan.

One Canadian soldier was found dead of non-combat-related causes at Camp Mirage, a forward logistics base in the United Arab Emirates near Dubai.

== See also ==
- War in Afghanistan (2001–2021)
- War in Afghanistan order of battle, 2012
- Criticism of the war on terror
- Civilian casualties in the war in Afghanistan (2001–2021)
- List of Afghan security forces fatality reports in Afghanistan
- List of aviation accidents and incidents in the war in Afghanistan
- International public opinion on the war in Afghanistan
- ISAF
- Operation Enduring Freedom
- Protests against the war in Afghanistan
- Taliban insurgency
- Tarnak Farm incident
