= List of Norwegian Armed Forces casualties in Afghanistan =

From late 2001, following the United States-led Invasion of Afghanistan, and during subsequent the War in Afghanistan, the Norwegian Armed Forces maintained a steady presence of troops, (peaking at approximately 90) in the country, attached to the larger International Security Assistance Force (ISAF).

As of October 2013, there had been 10 Norwegian Armed Forces fatalities in the War, seven of these due to Improvised explosive devices, two due to direct hostile gunfire, and one in connection with the 2011 Mazar-i-Sharif attack. In addition there were at least 26 non-fatal combat-related casualties.

== List of fatalities ==
The following is a list of the fatal casualties:

Date of death	Name	Rank	Age	Sub unit	Unit	Cause of death	Location of death	Place of origin
23 May 2004	Tommy Rødningsby	Grenadier	29	Telemark Task Force II	Telemark Battalion	Hostile fire	Outside Kabul	Skreia, Østre Toten Municipality
23 July 2007	Tor Arne Lau-Henriksen	Lieutenant	33	Army Ranger Command	Armed Forces' Special Command	Hostile fire	Outside Kabul	Elverum Municipality
8 November 2007	Kristoffer Sørli Jørgensen	Grenadier	22	5th Oppland Home Guard	Home Guard	IED attack	Meymaneh, Faryab province	Stange Municipality
17 April 2009	Trond Petter Kolset	Captain	29	Intelligence Battalion	Northern Brigade	IED attack	West of Mazar-e Sharif	Steinkjer Municipality, Trøndelag
25 January 2010	Claes Joachim Olsson	Grenadier	22	Provincial Reconstruction Team Meymaneh	Telemark Battalion	IED attack	Ghowrmach	Gressvik, Fredrikstad Municipality
27 June 2010	Trond André Bolle	Commander	41	Norwegian Navy Special Operations Command	Navy Special Forces	IED attack	Almar	Lena, Østre Toten Municipality
27 June 2010	Christian Lian	Lieutenant	31	Coastal Ranger Command	Navy Special Forces	IED attack	Almar	Kristiansand Municipality
27 June 2010	Simen Tokle	Ensign	24	Coastal Ranger Command	Navy Special Forces	IED attack	Almar	Ballangen Municipality, Troms
27 June 2010	Andreas Eldjarn	Quartermaster	21	Coastal Ranger Command	Navy Special Forces	IED attack	Almar	Tromsø Municipality, Troms
1 April 2011	Siri Skare	Lieutenant Colonel	52	United Nations Assistance Mission in Afghanistan	Norwegian Air Force	Mob violence	Mazar-e Sharif	Åndalsnes, Rauma Municipality
