= War in Afghanistan order of battle, 2012 =

Coalition forces in Afghanistan (2012)

This list covers coalition forces in Afghanistan in 2012. See the article Participants in Operation Enduring Freedom for coalition support for Operation Enduring Freedom from October 2001 to 2003. For coalition forces involved in NATO combat operations in the past, see the articles Coalition combat operations in Afghanistan in 2006, Coalition combat operations in Afghanistan in 2007, and Coalition combat operations in Afghanistan in 2008.

The ISAF seal.

The ISAF flag.

Below is the disposition and structure of international military forces that were participating in the War in Afghanistan in November 2012, listing deployed units under the command of the International Security Assistance Force (ISAF), which controlled both combat and reconstruction operations (often led by the Provincial Reconstruction Teams). During its existence from 2001 to 2014, despite the photos in this article only showing American soldiers, marines and sailors, the ISAF comprised units from many countries, including: Albania, Armenia, Australia, Belgium, Canada, Croatia, Czech Republic, Estonia, Finland, France, Georgia, Germany, Hungary, Italy, Latvia, Lithuania, Macedonia, Netherlands, New Zealand, Norway, Poland, Romania, South Korea, Spain, Sweden, Turkey, United Kingdom and others. In this article, units are assumed to be from the United States unless otherwise stated. This list is a rough and unofficial listing of units and formations.

== International Security Assistance Force ==
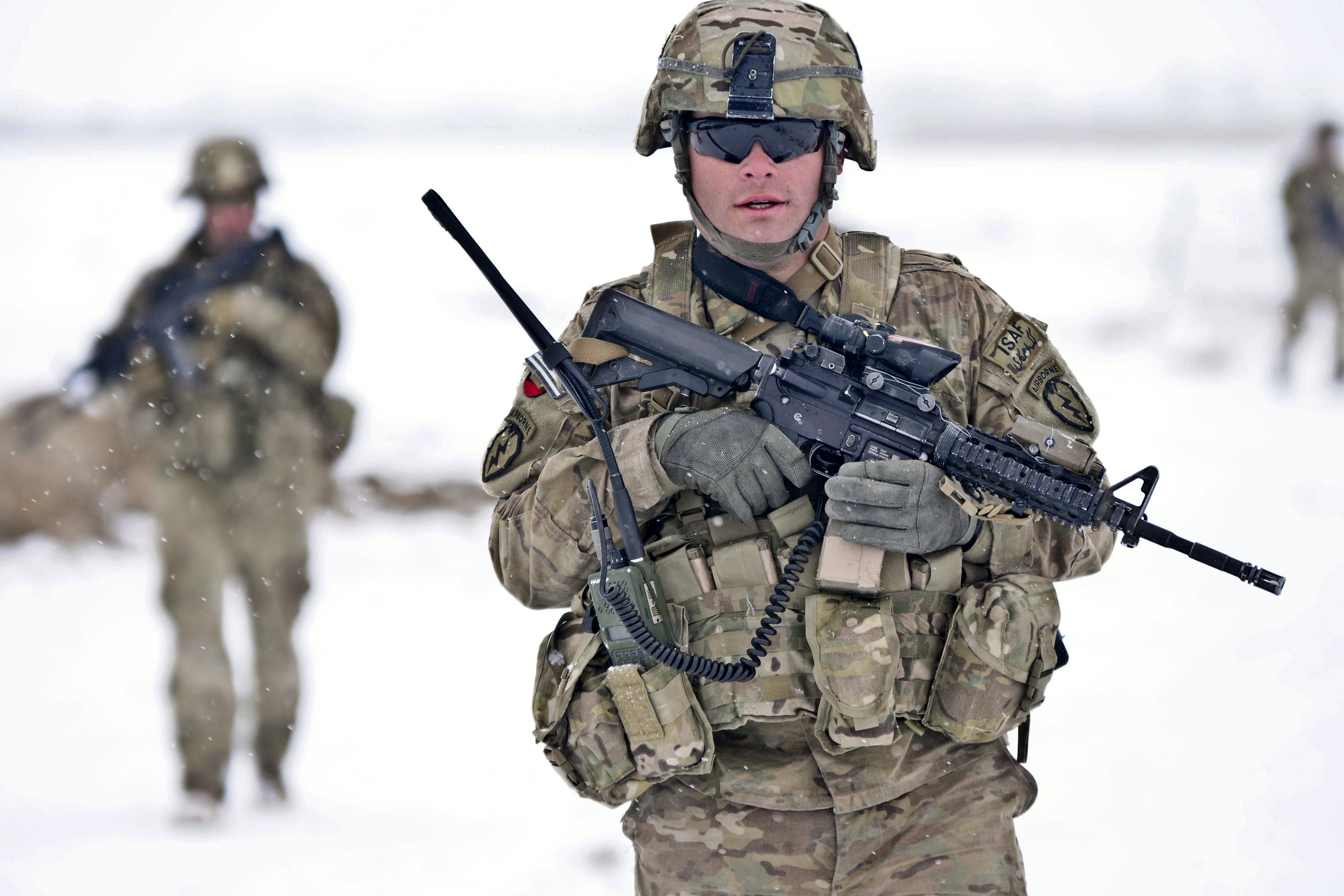
A U.S. 25th Infantry Division soldier with the ISAF patrolling the Paktya Province in January 2012.

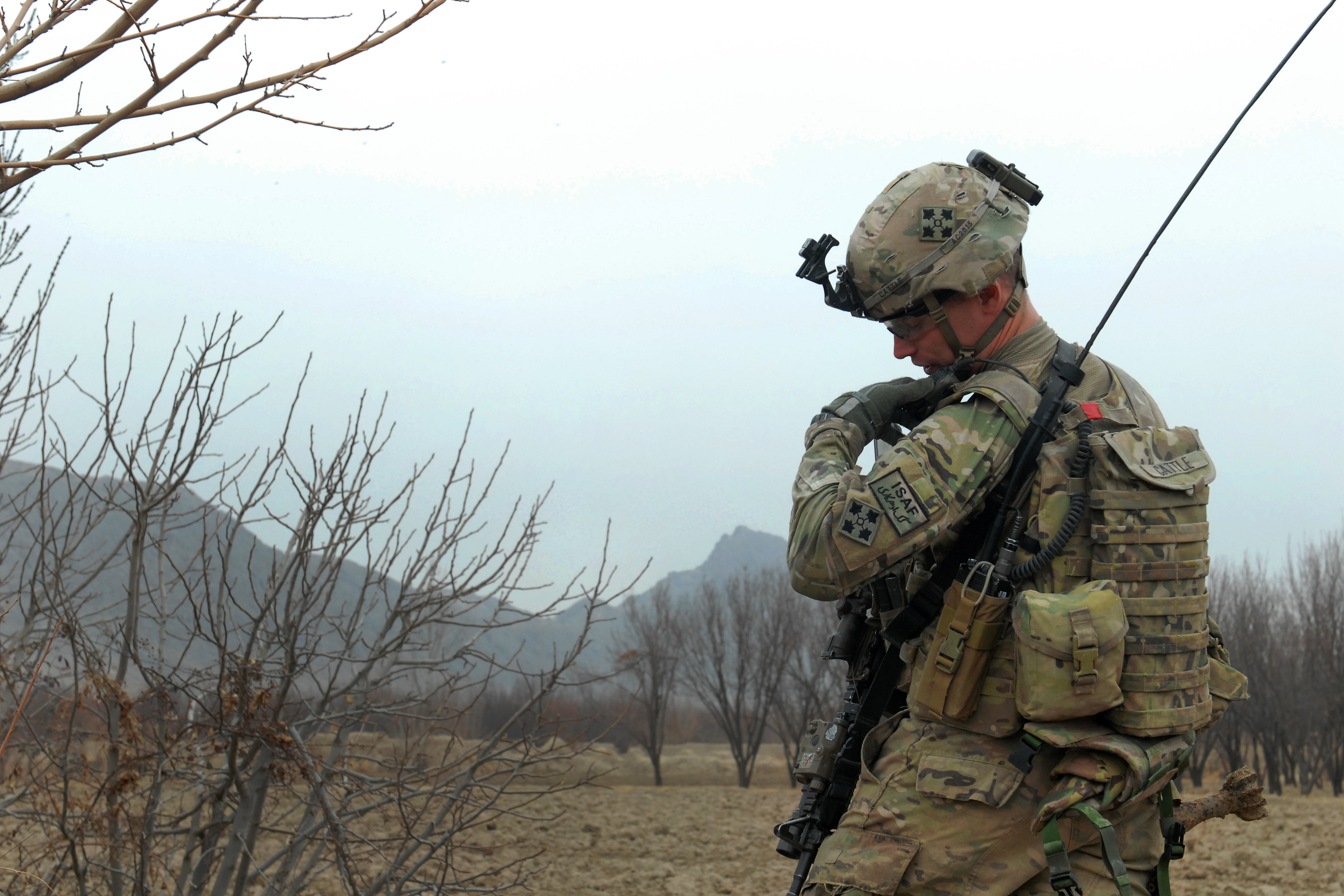
A U.S. 4th Infantry Division soldier with the ISAF soldier during a joint operation with Afghan police in Kandahar in February 2012.

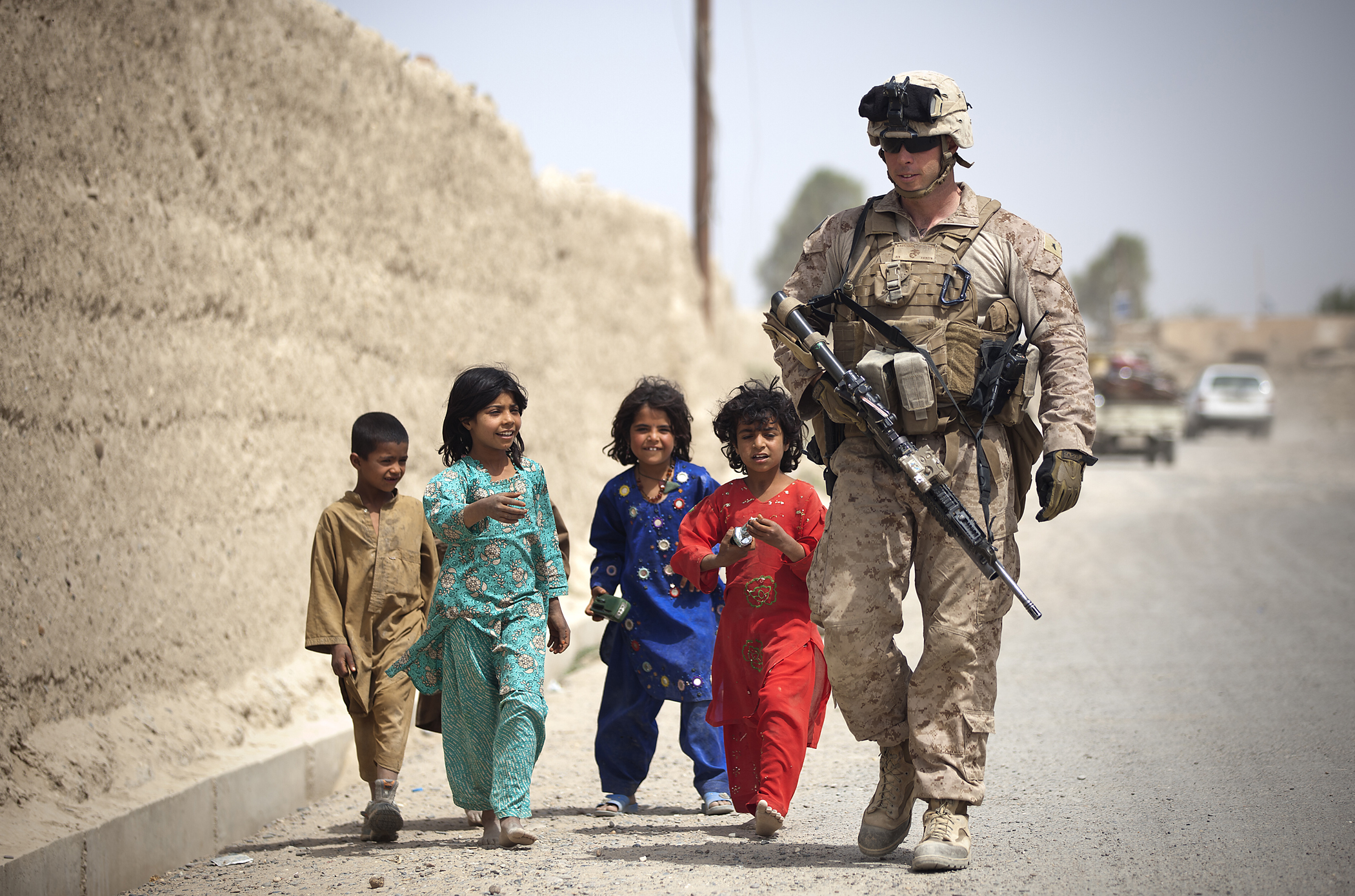
A U.S. Marine with the ISAF walking alongside Afghan children in Afghanistan's Helmand Province in April 2012.

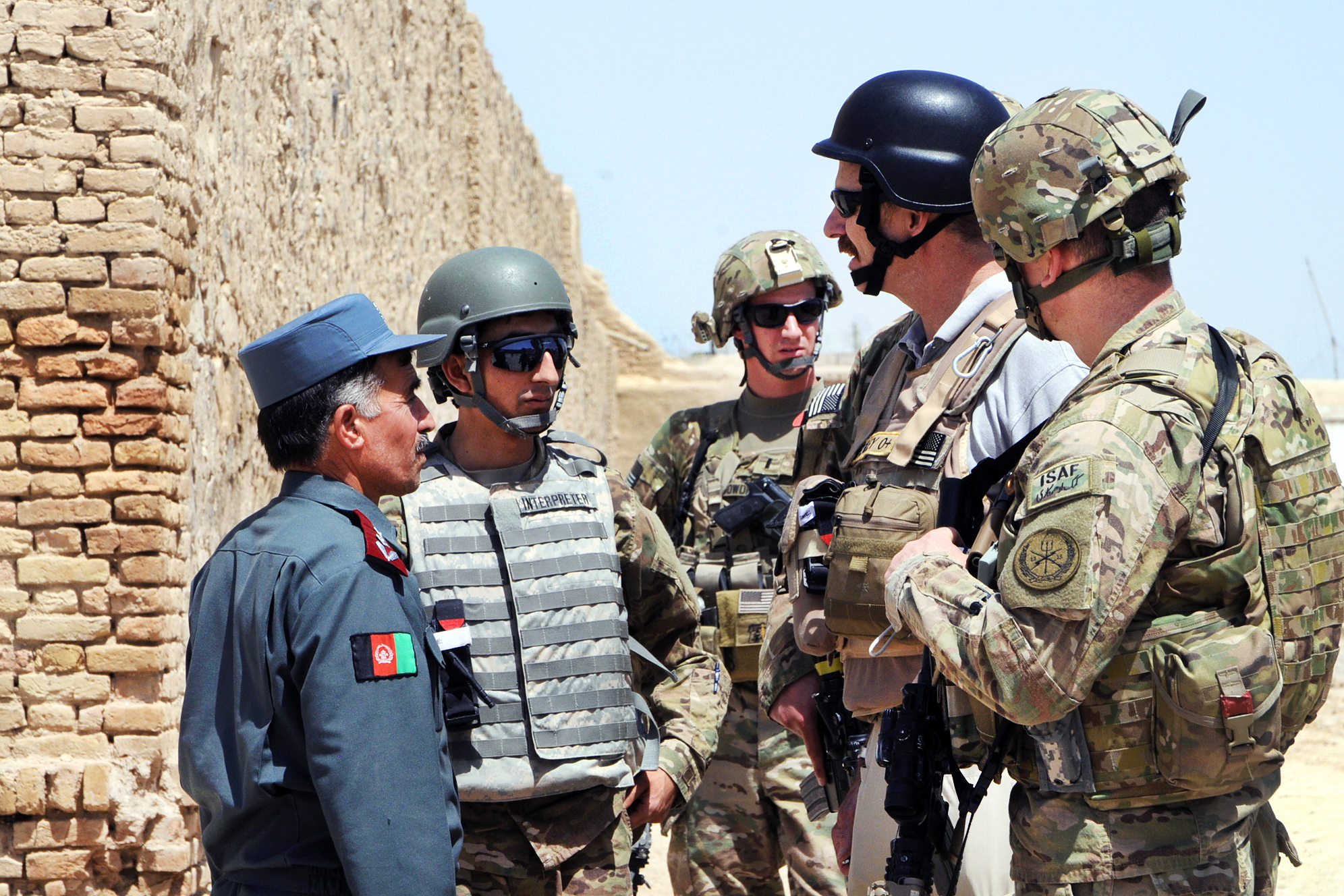
U.S. soldiers with the ISAF, with Afghan policemen in April 2012.

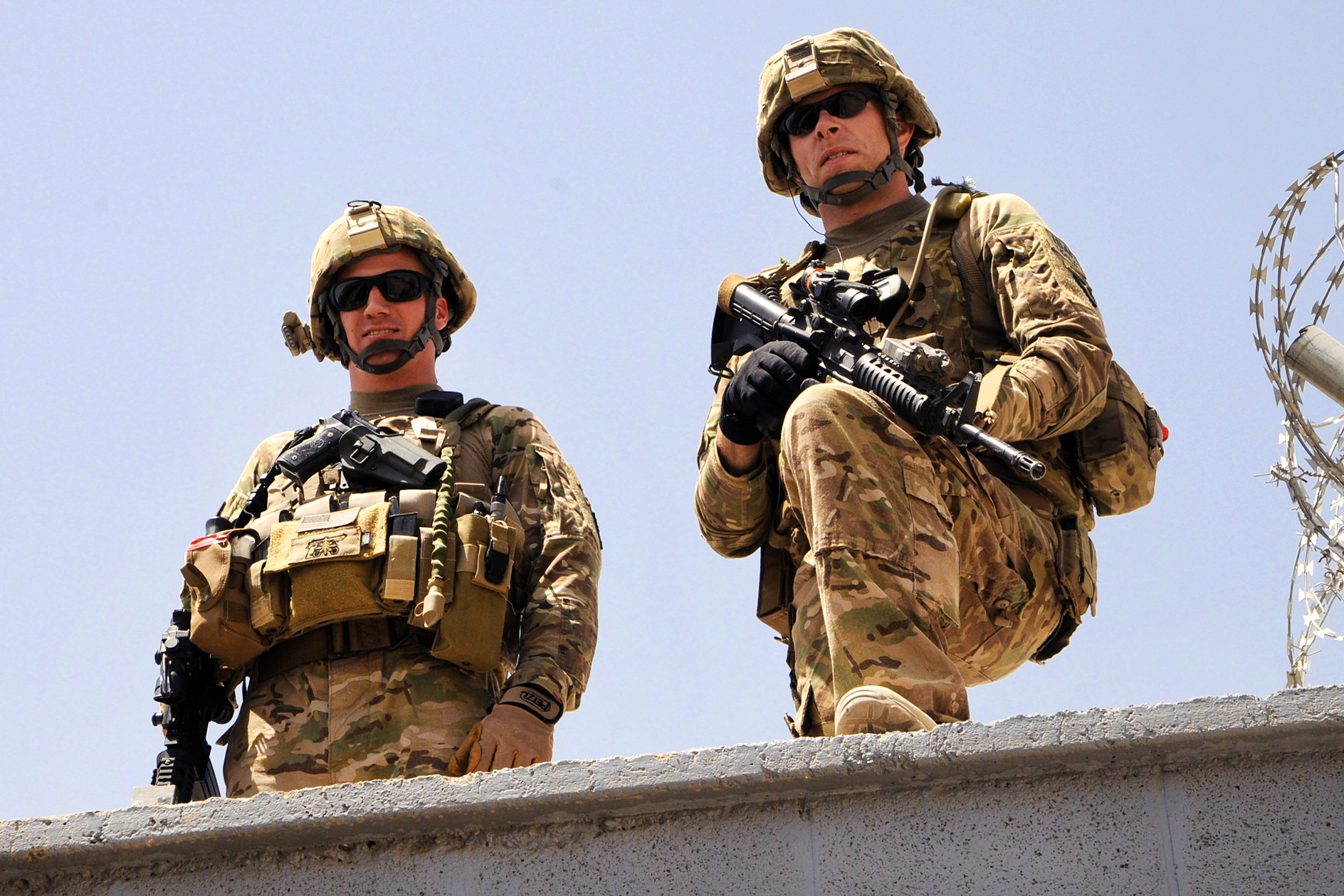
U.S. soldiers with the ISAF in Farah Province in April 2012.

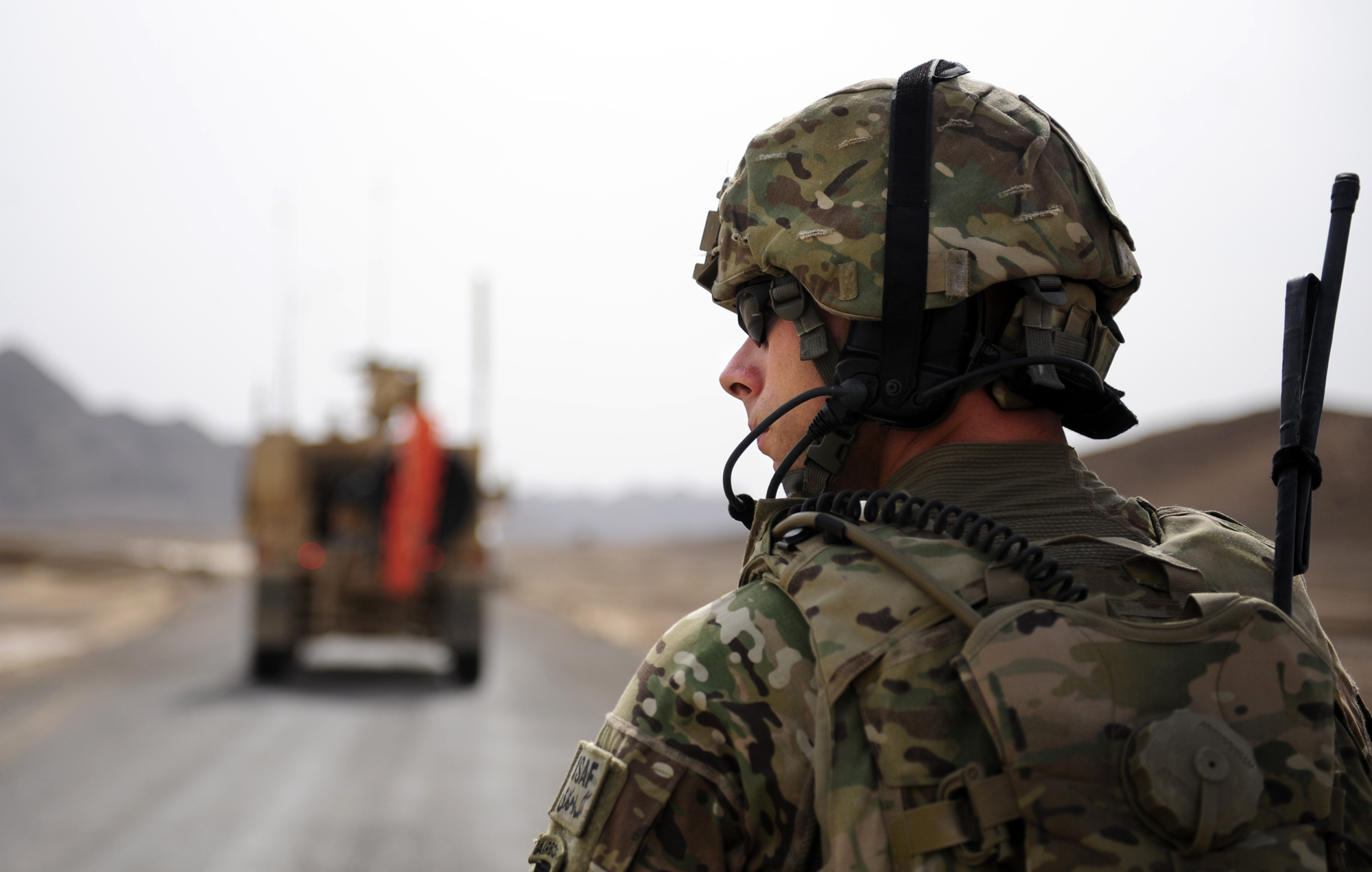
A U.S. soldier with the ISAF in May 2012.

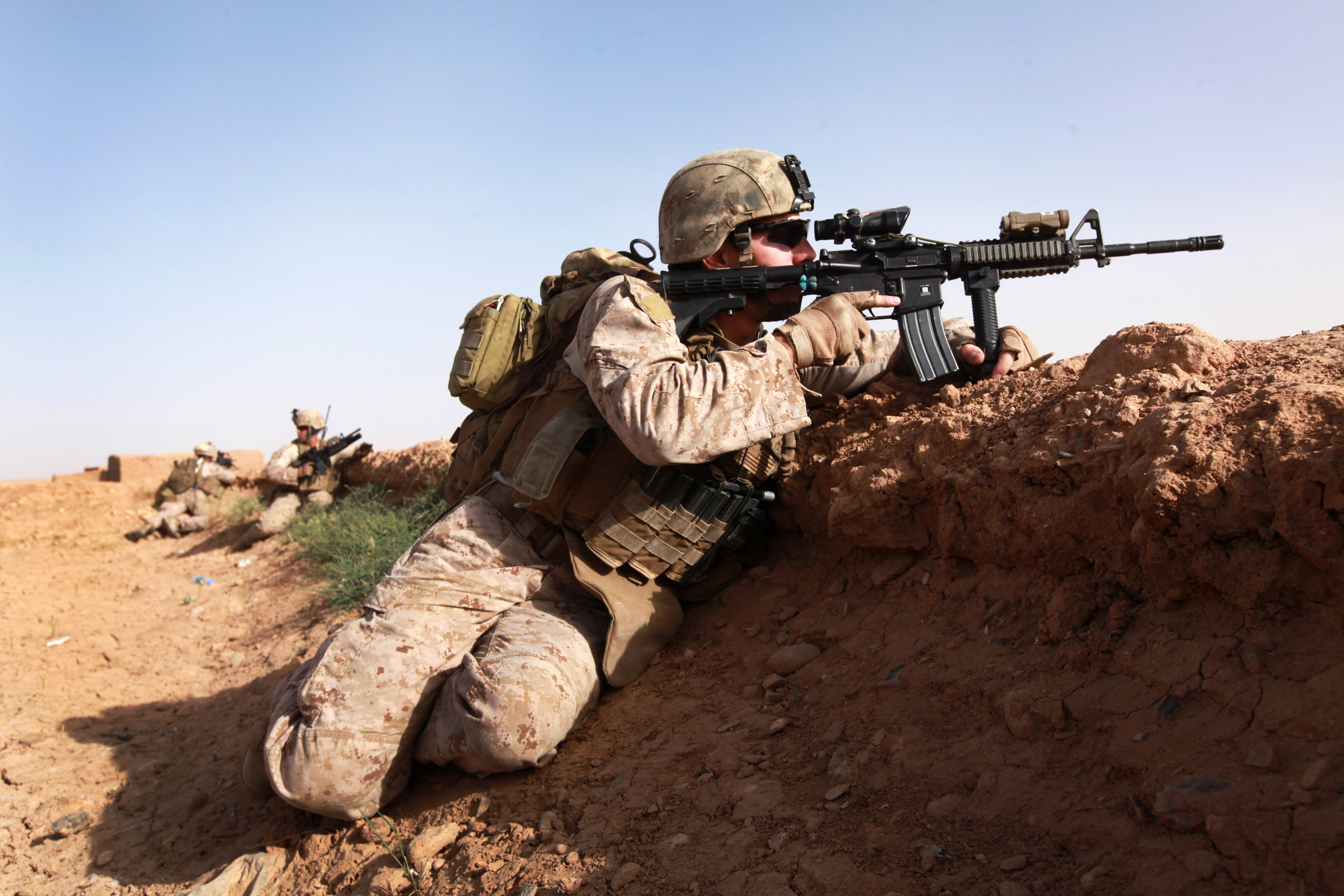
A U.S. sailor with the ISAF in June 2012.

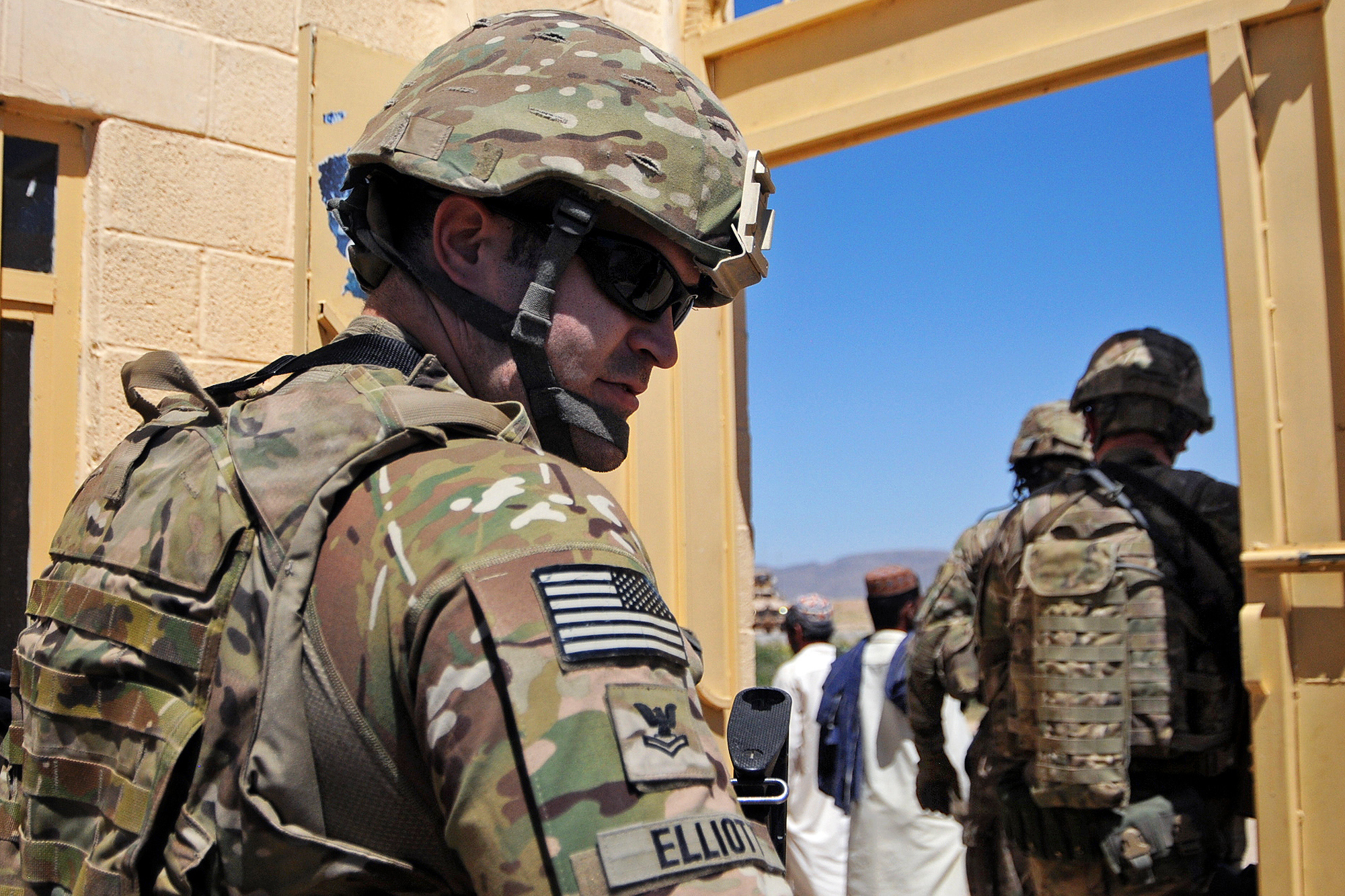
A U.S. sailor with the ISAF in June 2012.

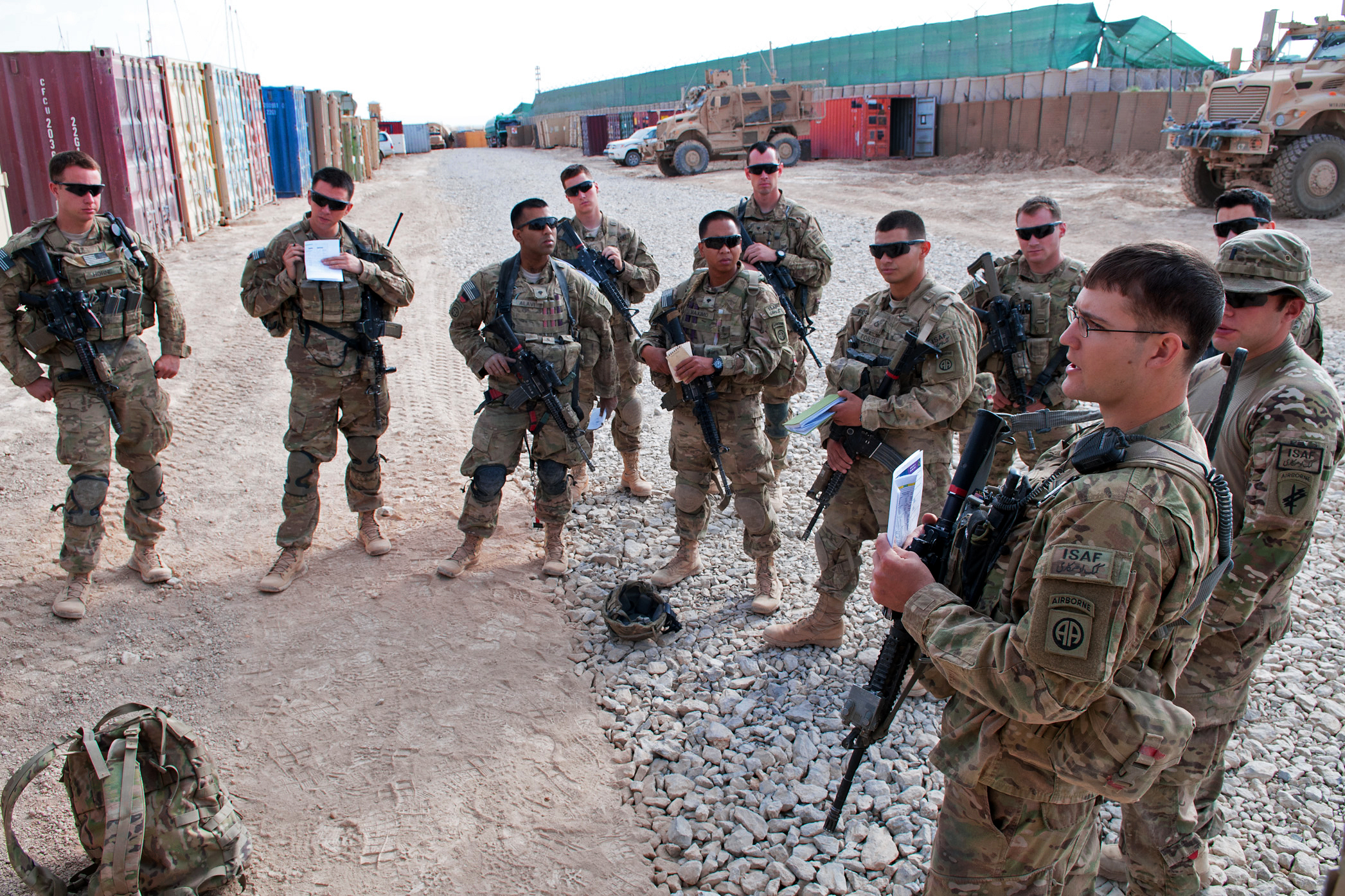
U.S. soldiers with the ISAF in July 2012.

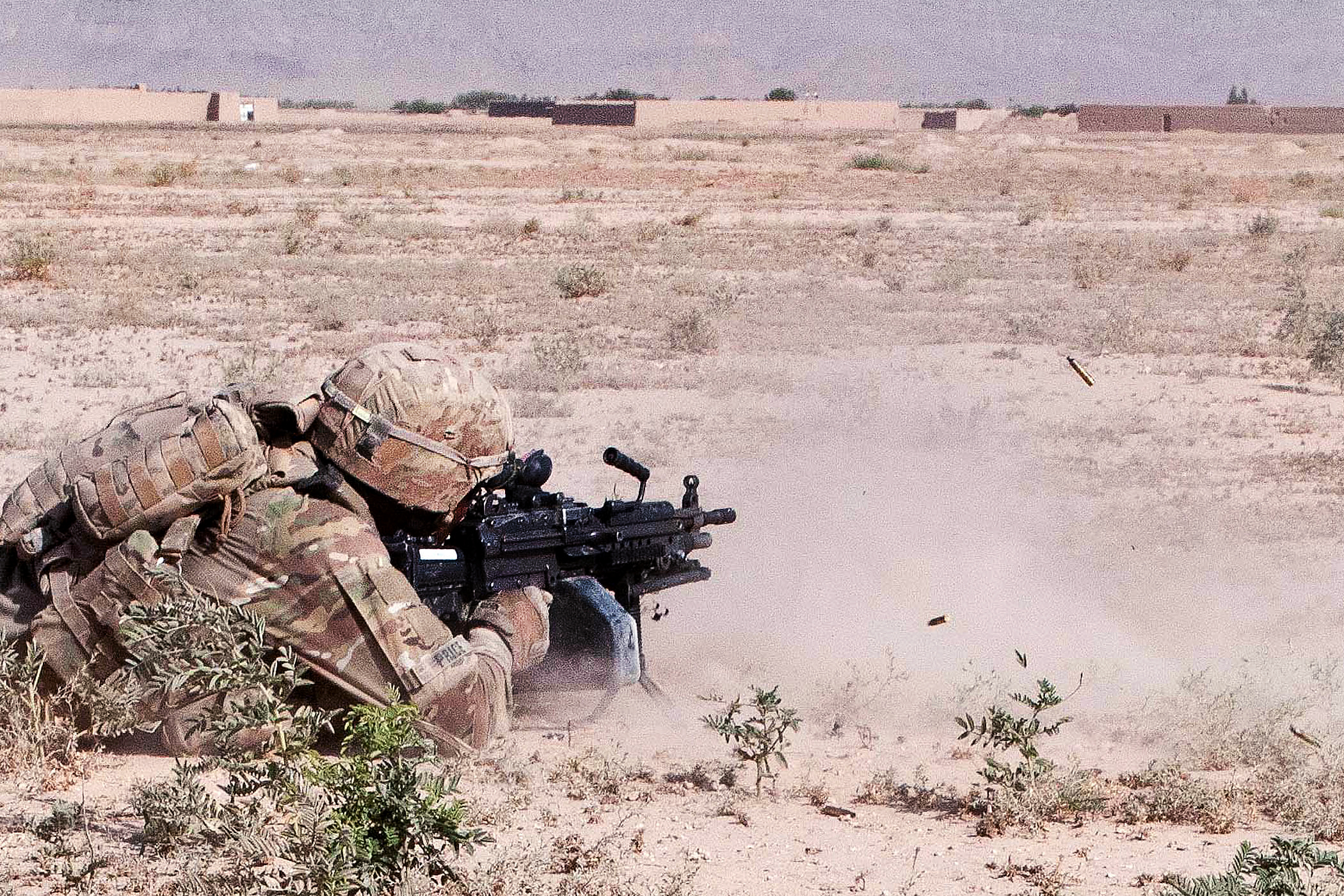
A U.S. soldier with the ISAF in August 2012 engaged in battle.

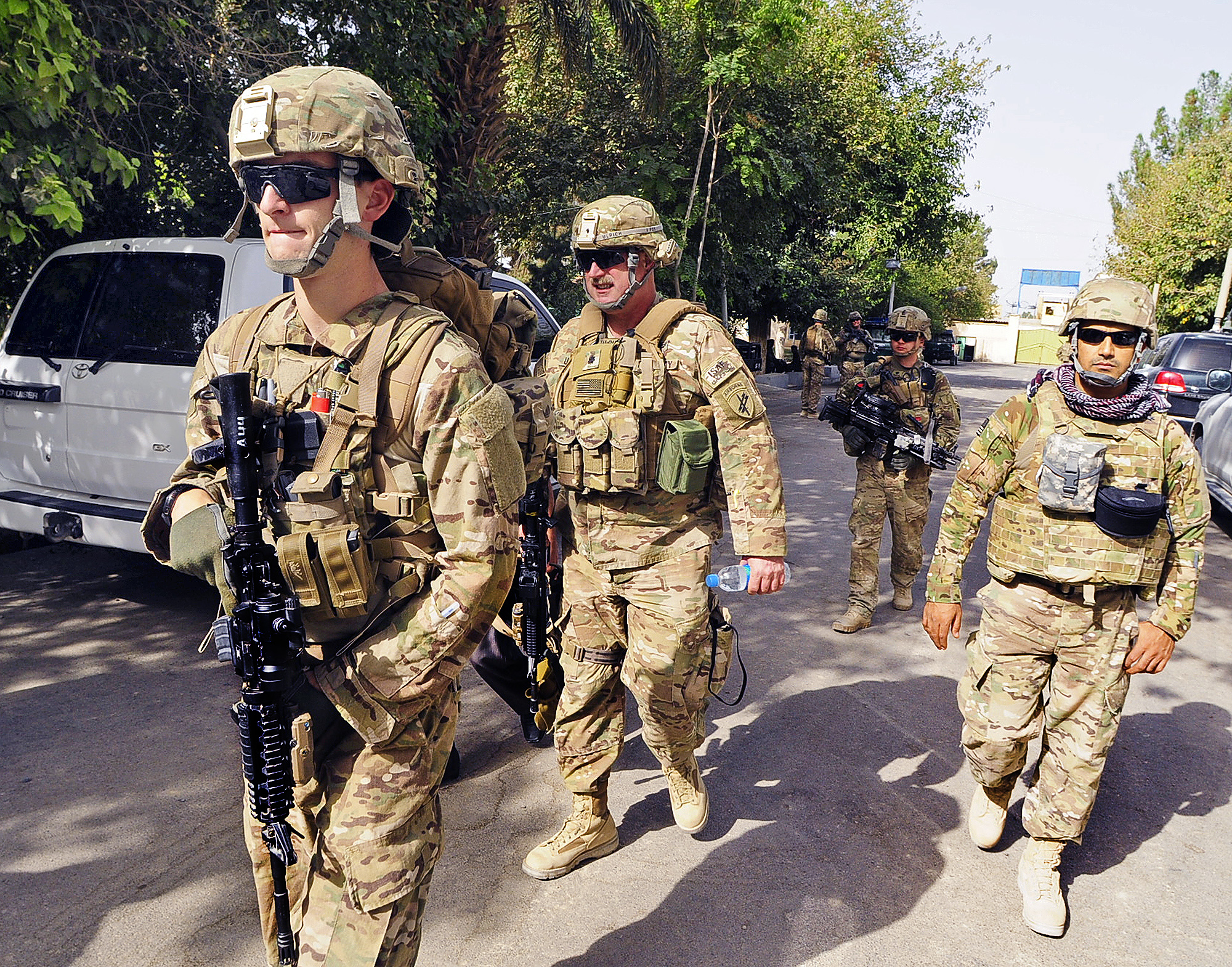
U.S. soldiers with the ISAF in August 2012.

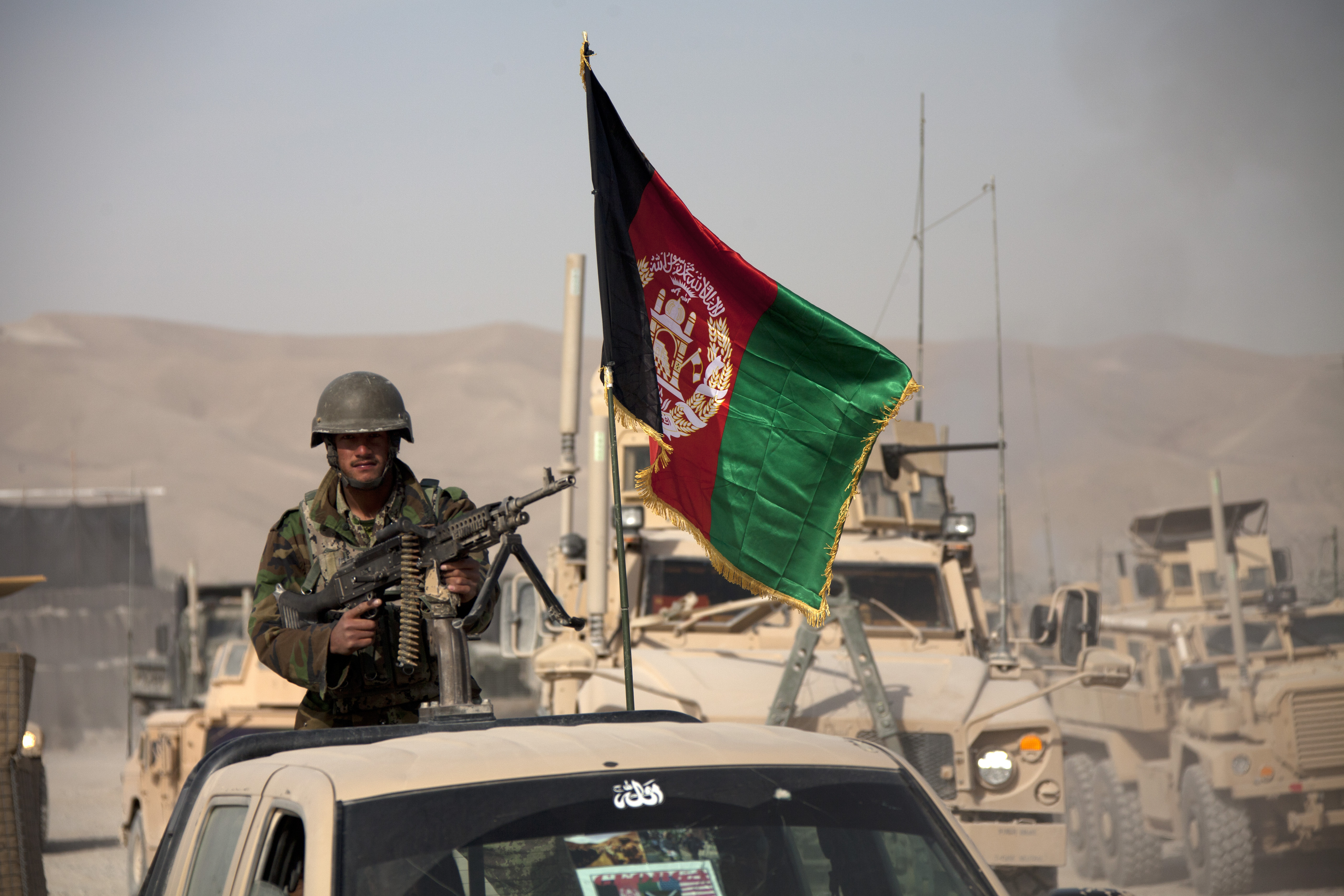
An Afghan soldier in November 2012.

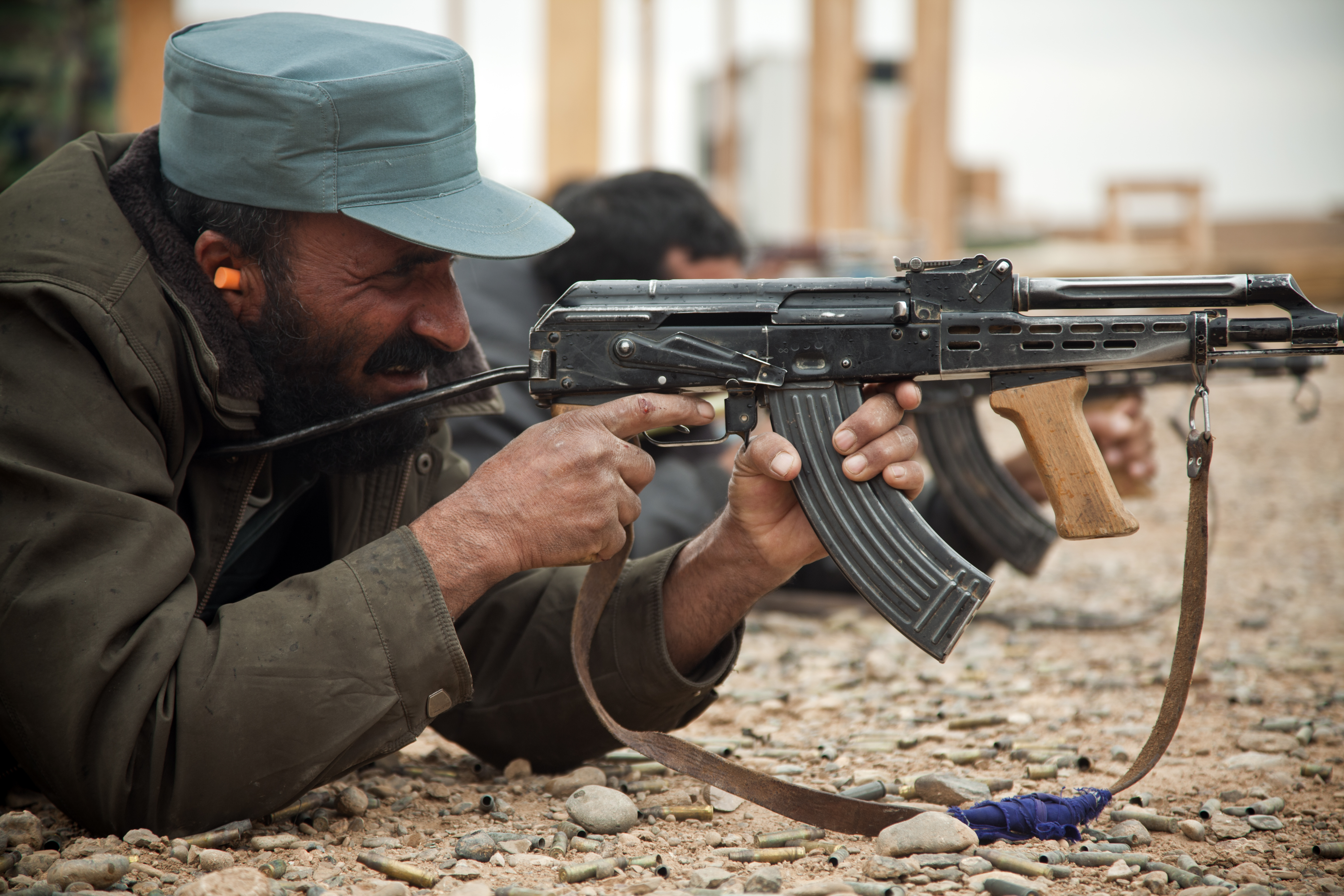
An Afghan policeman in December 2012.

The overall command of the NATO-led International Security Assistance Force in 2012 started from Supreme Headquarters Allied Powers Europe at Casteau, Belgium. The overall command was vested in Joint Force Command Brunssum at Brunssum in the Netherlands, then the Commander ISAF (COMISAF). The COMISAF in 2012 was USMC General John R. Allen, at ISAF Headquarters in Kabul.

There were three subordinate commands under COMISAF: the Intermediate Joint Command, which controls the tactical battle along the lines of the Multi-National Corps Iraq; the NATO Training Mission-Afghanistan/Combined Security Transition Command – Afghanistan, which trains the Afghan National Army; and Special Operations Forces.

The Intermediate Joint Command in turn controlled the regional commands, roughly analogous to divisions. There were six regional commands: Capital (at Kabul), South, Southwest, North, East, and West. Each regional command had a headquarters to provide command and control and logistics support for its area of responsibility, and comprised both combat units and Provincial Reconstruction Teams (PRTs).

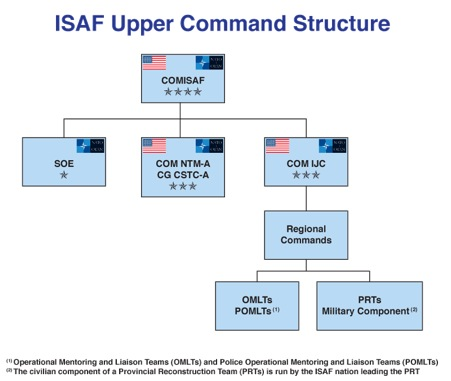

=== Regional Command Capital ===
- Commander: Brigadier General Rafet Sevinc Sasmaz (Turkey)
- Headquarters: Kabul
- Area of responsibility: Kabul Province

==== Combat units ====
Unit	Headquarters	Tasking
1st Battalion Motorized Task Force (Turkey)	Camp Dogan, Kabul	Responsible for Kabul Province.
2nd Battalion Motorized Task Force (Turkey)	Camp Gazi, Kabul	Responsible for Kabul Province.

==== Provincial Reconstruction Teams ====
Regional Command Capital has no Provincial Reconstruction Teams.

=== Regional Command South ===
- Commander: Major General Robert Abrams (USA)
- Headquarters: Kandahar Airfield
- Area of responsibility: Kandahar, Orūzgān, and Zabul Provinces.

==== Combat units ====
Unit	Headquarters	Tasking	Dates
76th Brigade Combat Team; Combined Team Uruzgan	Camp Holland, Tarin Kowt	Responsible for Orūzgān Province.	
3rd Stryker Brigade Combat Team, 2nd Infantry Division (Task Force Arrowhead)	FOB Masum Ghar, Panjwaye	Responsible for Zabul Province and southern and eastern Kandahar Province	
2nd Stryker Brigade Combat Team, 2nd Infantry Division (Task Force Lancer)	Camp Nathan Smith	Responsible for Kandahar City and Arghandab District.	May 2012 – January 2013
25th Combat Aviation Brigade (Task Force Wings)	Kandahar Airfield	Aviation support for Regional Command South.	

==== Provincial Reconstruction Teams ====
Designation	Composition	Headquarters	Sponsors
PRT Kandahar		Kandahar	Lead country: U.S.
PRT Uruzgan		Tarin Kowt	Lead country: Australia
PRT Zabul		Qalat	Lead country: U.S. Supporting countries: Romania; United Kingdom

=== Regional Command Southwest ===
- Commander: Major General Charles M. Gurganus (USMC)
- Headquarters: Camp Leatherneck, Helmand
- Area of Operations: Helmand and Nimruz Provinces

==== Combat units ====
Unit	Headquarters	Tasking
12th Mechanized Brigade (United Kingdom) (Task Force Helmand)	MOB Lashkar Gah	Conducts ground operations in central Helmand Province.
Regimental Combat Team 6 (Task Force Leatherneck)	Camp Leatherneck	Responsible for Nimruz Province and northern and southern Helmand Province.
3rd Marine Aircraft Wing	Camp Leatherneck	Aviation support in Helmand and Nimruz Provinces.
Joint Aviation Group (United Kingdom)	Camp Bastion	Headquarters for British aviation units.

==== Provincial Reconstruction Teams ====
- PRT Helmand (Lead nation: United Kingdom)

Designation	Composition	Headquarters	Sponsors
PRT Helmand		Lashkar Gah	Lead nation: UK

=== Regional Command East ===
- Commander: Major General Bill Mayville, USA
- Headquarters: Bagram Airfield
- Area of responsibility: Ghazni, Kapisa, Khost, Kunar, Laghman, Logar, Nangarhar, Nuristan, Paktika, Paktia, Panjshir, Parwan and Wardak Provinces and Surobi District of Kabul Province

==== Combat units ====
Unit	Headquarters	Tasking
4th Infantry Brigade Combat Team, 1st Infantry Division (Task Force Dragon)	FOB Sharana	Responsible for Paktika Province.
4th Brigade Combat Team, 4th Infantry Division (Task Force Warrior)	Jalalabad Airfield	Responsible for Nangarhar, Laghman, Nuristan, and Kunar Provinces.
173rd Airborne Brigade Combat Team (Task Force Bayonet)	FOB Shank, Logar	Responsible for Logar and Wardak Provinces.
101st Combat Aviation Brigade (Task Force Destiny)	Bagram Airfield	Provides aviation support for eastern and northern Afghanistan.
4th Airborne Brigade Combat Team, 25th Infantry Division (Task Force Spartan)	FOB Salerno, Khost	Responsible for Khost and Paktia Provinces.
2nd Armored Brigade (France) (Task Force Lafayette)	FOB Nijrab, Kapisa	Responsible for Kapisa Province.
6th Airborne Brigade (Task Force White Eagle, Poland)	FOB Ghazni	Responsible for Ghazni Province.

==== Provincial Reconstruction Teams ====
Designation	Composition	Headquarters	Sponsors
PRT Logar	200 military personnel 10 civilians	FOB Shank	Lead nation: Czech Republic
PRT Ghazni			Lead nation: Poland; Supporting nation: U.S.
Provincial Reconstruction Team (New Zealand)		Bamiyan, Bamiyan Province	Lead nation: New Zealand
PRT Kapisa			Lead nation: U.S. Supporting nation: France
PRT Parwan			Lead nation: South Korea
PRT Wardak			Lead nation: Turkey
PRT Panjshir			Lead nation: U.S.
PRT Paktika			Lead nation: U.S.
PRT Mehtar Lam			Lead nation: U.S.
PRT Khost		FOB Salerno	Lead nation: U.S.
PRT Nangahar		Jalalabad	Lead nation: U.S.
PRT Patkia		Gardez	Lead nation: U.S.
PRT Kunar		Asadabad	Lead nation: U.S.
PRT Nuristan			Lead nation: U.S.

=== Regional Command North ===
- Commander: Major General Erich Pfeffer, Germany
- Headquarters: Mazar-i-Sharif
- Area of responsibility – Badakhshan, Baghlan, Balkh, Faryab, Jowzjan, Kunduz, Samangan, Sar-e Pul and Takhar Provinces.

==== Combat units ====
Unit	Headquarters	Tasking
Task Force Kunduz (Germany)	FOB Kunduz	Operating in eastern Regional Command North.
Task Force Mazar-e-Sharif (Germany)	Camp Marmal	Operating in western Regional Command North.
Expeditionary Air Wing Mazar-e-Sharif (Germany)	Camp Marmal	Aviation support for northern Afghanistan.
3rd Squadron, 7th Cavalry Regiment (United States) (Task Force Garry Owen)	FOB Kunduz	Operating in Kunduz province

==== Provincial Reconstruction Teams ====
Designation	Composition	Headquarters	Sponsors
PRT Kunduz			Lead nation: Germany; Supporting countries: Armenia; Belgium; U.S.
PRT Mazar-i-Sharif			Lead nations: Finland and Sweden; Supporting countries: U.S.
PRT Meymaneh			Lead nation: Norway; Supporting countries: Latvia; Macedonia; U.S.
PRT Pul-e Khumri			Lead nation: Hungary; Supporting nations: Albania; Croatia; Montenegro
PRT Faizabad			Lead nation: Germany; Supporting nations: Mongolia; U.S.

=== Regional Command West ===
- Commander: Brigadier General Dario Mari Ranieri, Italy
- Headquarters: Camp Arena, Herat
- Area of responsibility: Badghis, Farah, Ghor, and Herat Provinces
- Airfields: Herat International Airport, Shindand Air Base

==== Combat units ====
Unit	Headquarters	Tasking
Task Force Badghis (Spain)	Qala-e-Naw	Operating in Badghis Province.
3rd Alpine Regiment, Italy (Task Force Center)	Camp La Marmora, Shindand	Operating in southern Herat Province.
32nd Engineer Regiment, Italy (Task Force Genio)	Herat	Engineer support for western Afghanistan.
9th Alpine Regiment, Italy (Task Force South)	Camp El Alamein, Farah	Operating in western Farah Province.
2nd Alpine Regiment, Italy (Task Force Southeast)	Camp Lavaredo, Bakwa District	Operating in eastern Farah Province.
7th Aviation Regiment, Italy (Task Force Fenice)	Herat Airfield	Providing aviation support for western Afghanistan.

==== Provincial Reconstruction Teams ====
Unit	Sub-units	Headquarters	Tasking
PRT Herat			Lead nation: Italy
PRT Farah			Lead nation: U.S.
PRT Qal'ah-ye Now			Lead nation: Spain
PRT Chagcharan			Lead nation: Lithuania

== U.S.-led coalition ==
In 2012, the overall command of the U.S.-led coalition effort in Afghanistan—known as Operation Enduring Freedom—Afghanistan—was headquartered at Bagram Air Base, Afghanistan, which reported to United States Central Command. OEF-Afghanistan's two major commands in 2012 were Combined Joint Task Force 101, and the Combined Security Transition Command – Afghanistan (CSTC-A). After the Stage IV transition of authority to ISAF, the status of the 10th Combat Aviation Brigade/Task Force Falcon, which handles all the helicopter combat aviation duties in Afghanistan, was uncertain, along with the exact status of Combined Task Force Sword, the engineer task force, and the Combined Joint Special Operations Task Force. It was unclear exactly what units are assigned to OEF-Afghanistan, but the operation in 2012 was in charge of counter-terrorist operations, including pursuing al-Qaeda along Afghanistan's inhospitable border region with Pakistan.

Combined Security Transition Command – Afghanistan (CSTC-A)

- In 2012, this command was responsible for training the Afghan National Army and the Afghan National Police through its headquarters and Combined Joint Task Force (CJTF) Phoenix. CSTC-A was responsible for mentoring the ministries of defense and interior, while CJTF Phoenix was responsible for mentoring Afghan National Army corps and below and Afghan National Police districts and below. CJTF Phoenix was headquartered by the 33rd Brigade Combat Team, Illinois Army National Guard, which relieved the 27th Brigade Combat Team, New York Army National Guard in late 2008, which relieved the 218th Brigade Combat Team, South Carolina Army National Guard in early 2008. The rest of the task force was made up of National Guard and Reserve personnel from 42 states, U.S. Marine Corps reservists, active duty representatives from the U.S. Air Force, U.S. Navy, and U.S. Marine Corps, and soldiers assigned from France, Germany, Romania, Canada, New Zealand, Mongolia, and the United Kingdom.
