= Provincial Reconstruction Team Mazar-i-Sharif =

Coordinates: 36°42′0″N 67°7′0″E

Provincial Reconstruction Team Mazar-i-Sharif was a Provincial Reconstruction Team in Afghanistan, and was part of the NATO International Security Assistance Force (ISAF) mission. Mazar-i-Sharif is a city in Balkh province which fell under the control of Regional Command North.

Since 2006 the PRT's unit commanders were Swedish military officers, on loan to ISAF. It has ISAF-soldiers that are citizens of Sweden or Finland.

== See also ==
- 2011 Mazar-i-Sharif attack
- Afghan War order of battle
- Provincial Reconstruction Team
