= Siri Skare =

Norwegian aviator (1958–2011)

Siri Skare (6 June 1958 – 1 April 2011) was the first female aviator in the armed forces of Norway. She died during a demonstration in Mazar-i-Sharif in 2011.

== Early life ==
Skare was originally from Åndalsnes in Møre og Romsdal county, Norway. A resident of Oslo, Skare was married and had one child.

== Career ==
Already a civilian pilot and flight instructor with more than 1400 hours, she completed her military pilot training in 1984, and went on to fly Lockheed P-3 Orion at 333 Squadron and later Lockheed C-130 Hercules at 335 Squadron. She achieved the rank of lieutenant colonel within the Royal Norwegian Air Force.

Skare became a military advisor to the United Nations Assistance Mission in Afghanistan, in August 2010.

== Death ==
Skare was killed at the United Nations Assistance Mission in Afghanistan (UNAMA) compound during a protest in Mazar-i-Sharif on 1 April 2011, and two other UNAMA staff died along with their four armed security guards and a number of protesters.

Her remains were transported to a ceremony that was held in a hangar at Gardermoen, with Crown Prince Haakon and Minister of Defence Grete Faremo in attendance. Her grave is at Grytten Church in Rauma Municipality.
