= List of Afghan security forces fatality reports in Afghanistan =

This is a comprehensive list of Afghan security forces killed in the war in Afghanistan.

Besides serving as an indicator of some of the numbers of policemen, soldiers and private military contractors (PMCs) deaths during specific time periods, this article allows readers to investigate the circumstances of those deaths by reading the citation articles.

By mid-October 2009, overall it was confirmed that more than 5,500 soldiers and policemen were killed since the start of the war. In early March 2014, the number was updated to 13,729. Another 16,511 soldiers and policemen were wounded. Among the dead were 4,551 soldiers who died by 20 March 2013. The number of soldiers killed was updated to 6,835 by September 20, 2014. In 2017, casualty figures of the ANSDF became classified information.

Based on the numbers below, in the Afghan Defense and Interior Ministry section figures, by December 31, 2014, 21,008 soldiers and policemen had been killed since June 2002. According to Neta C. Crawford, a Professor of Political Science at Boston University and Co-Director of the Costs of War Project, an estimated 23,470 security forces members, including 14,200 policemen and 7,750 soldiers, had been killed since the start of the war until the end of 2014. Additionally, 28,529 policemen and soldiers were reported killed in the period between January 2015 and mid-November 2018, but this was later revised to over 45,000 fatalities for the period between the end of September 2014 and late January 2019. The Turkish Anadolu Agency reported that, according to declassified figures, an estimated 7,000 Afghan security forces were killed during 2019. Additionally, between 29 February and 21 July 2020, about 3,560 security forces members were killed. Crawford also presented a new updated estimate of 66,000–69,000 dead for the whole war, up to April 2021, and 69,095 dead by August 2021. In addition, right after the end of the war, Afghan general Sami Sadat confirmed 66,000 troops were killed during the 20 years of conflict, while general Yasin Zia, former Chief of General Staff of Afghanistan and Acting Defence Minister, reported to The Washington Post that Afghan security forces counted 92,000 killed members since 2001, citing data he collected. According to Zia, the last days of the war, from July 1 to August 15, were particularly deadly with 4,000 troops killed and 1,000 missing.

== Afghan security forces losses confirmed by time periods ==
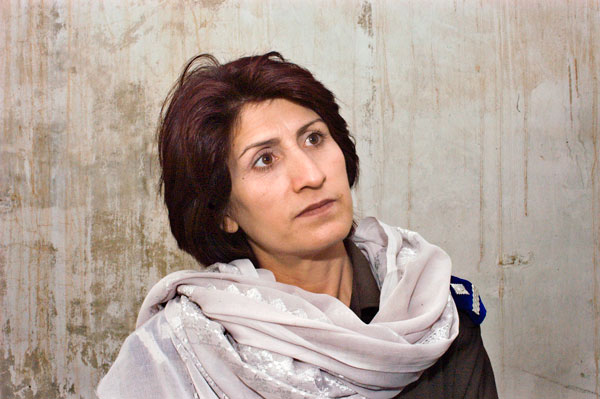
Malalai Kakar was assassinated in the morning outside her house on 28 September 2008.

=== Yearly totals per the Afghan Defense and Interior Ministry ===
==== 2002–14 ====
Note: Most of these annual numbers are per the Afghan calendar which starts on March 21 of the Gregorian calendar.

Police fatalities (per specific time periods reported)
Period	Number of killed
June 13, 2002 – May 16, 2005	600
June 1, 2005 – July 31, 2005	50
March 21, 2006 – March 20, 2007	630
March 21, 2007 – March 20, 2008	1,119
March 21, 2008 – March 20, 2009	1,290
March 21, 2009 – March 20, 2010	1,410
March 21, 2010 – March 20, 2011	1,360
March 21, 2011 – March 20, 2012	1,400
March 21, 2012 – March 20, 2013	1,800
March 21, 2013 – September 1, 2013	1,792
January 1, 2014 – December 31, 2014	3,720
TOTAL	14,173

Military fatalities (per specific time periods reported)
Period	Number of killed
March 21, 2003 – March 20, 2004	9
March 21, 2004 – March 20, 2005	51
March 21, 2005 – March 20, 2006	138
March 21, 2006 – March 20, 2007	206
March 21, 2007 – March 20, 2008	325
March 21, 2008 – March 20, 2009	380
March 21, 2009 – March 20, 2010	635
March 21, 2010 – March 15, 2011	748
March 21, 2011 – March 20, 2012	831
March 21, 2012 – March 20, 2013	1,170
March 21, 2013 – March 20, 2014	1,392
March 21, 2014 – September 20, 2014	950
TOTAL	6,835

==== 2014–19 ====
Military and Police fatalities (per specific time periods reported)
Period	Number of killed
September 29 – December 31, 2014	N/A
2015	7,000
January 1 – November 12, 2016	6,785
2017	10,000
2018	N/A
January 2019	N/A
TOTAL	45,000

==== 2019–21 ====
Military and Police fatalities (per specific time periods reported)
Period	Number of killed
2019	7,000
January 2020	235
February 2020	133
February 29, 2020 – July 21, 2020	3,560
August 2020	287
September 2020	429
October 2020	369
November 2020	244
December 2020	185
January 2021	239
February 2021	257
March 2021	259
April 2021	301
May 2021	405
June 2021	703
July 1, 2021 – August 15, 2021	4,000
TOTAL	18,606

=== Yearly totals per the Brookings Institution ===
Period	Soldiers	Policemen
2007	209	803
2008	226	880
2009	282	646
2010	519	961
2011	550	1,400
2012	1,200	2,200
TOTAL	2,986	6,890

Period	Soldiers & Policemen
2013	4,700
2014	4,380
2015	7,000
2016	5,500
2017	2,500
TOTAL	24,080

== Afghan police losses before the start of official records ==
=== 2005 ===
In 2005, in addition to the overall above-mentioned totals, 42 policemen were reported killed.

- May
  - May 30 - Four policemen were killed in an attack on a police station in Zabul province.
- August
  - August 2 - Taliban militants attacked a police checkpoint in Nuristan province killing four policemen.
  - August 17 - A roadside bomb killed one policeman in Kandahar province.
  - August 21 - A roadside bomb killed two policemen in Zabul province.
  - August 22 - A roadside bomb killed two policemen in Oruzgan province.
  - August 31 - Militants kidnapped David Addison, a British engineer, and his interpreter after an attack in western Afghanistan that left at least three policemen dead. Addison’s body was found September 3.
- September
  - September 4 - Various Taliban attacks in the country left eight policemen dead.
  - September 17 - A Taliban attack in Kabul killed three policemen.
  - September 18 - Fighting in the east of the country left two policemen dead.
  - September 26 - A roadside bomb killed two policemen in Helmand province.
  - September 28 - A land mine killed two policemen in Kunar province.
- October
  - October 23 - Nine policemen were killed in an ambush in Helmand province.

=== 2006 ===
In 2006, in addition to the overall above-mentioned total, 49 policemen were reported killed and four policemen were missing in action.

- January
  - January 3 - One policeman was killed in Zabul province.
  - January 5 - A suicide bomber killed three policemen along with seven civilians in Oruzgan province.
  - January 27 - A roadside bomb killed two policemen in Helmand province.
- February
  - February 3 - Fighting in the Musa Qala district of Helmand province left six policemen dead.
  - February 4 - Fighting in the Nauzad district of Helmand province left one policeman dead.
  - February 5 - A roadside bomb killed six policemen in Kandahar province.
  - February 7 - A powerful bomb exploded outside the police headquarters in Kandahar killing seven policemen and six civilians.
  - February 13 - Three policemen were killed when their checkpoint was attacked in Helmand province.
  - February 15 - A bomb blast left one policeman dead.
  - February 16 - A clash killed one policeman in Nimroz province.
  - February 18 - Taliban militants attacked a police post in Helmand province killing three policemen.
- March
  - March 12 - Various Taliban attacks in the country left three policemen.
  - March 17 - Various Taliban attacks in the country left 10 policemen dead.
  - March 19 - A Taliban attack on a police post in Kandahar province left two policemen dead and four missing.

== Afghan private security guard losses ==
2002

- September 5 - An assassination attempt on the Afghan president in Kabul left one PMC guarding him dead along with a civilian.

2003

- April 29 - One PMC was killed when his checkpoint was attacked in Kandahar province.
- September 27 - Seven PMCs guarding the governor of Helmand province were killed in an ambush.

2004

- March 5 - One PMC was killed in an ambush in Zabul province.
- August 29 - Three PMCs were killed in an attack outside the doors of their compound in Kabul.

2005

- July 29 - A parliamentary candidate was killed along with six PMCs who were protecting him in Oruzgan province.
- September 27 - A PMC guarding a presidential candidate was killed along with the candidate in Mazar-e Sharif.

2006

- March 17–18 – Various Taliban attacks in the country left five PMCs dead and two missing.
- March 28 – Three PMCs were killed by a landmine in Farah province.
- April 23 - Taliban militants attacked a U.S.-funded Afghan construction company killing one PMC.
- May 24 - Various Taliban attacks in the country left three PMCs dead.
- June 18 - A former district chief was killed along with four PMCs who were guarding him in Helmand province.
- September 10 - A suicide bomber killed a provincial governor in eastern Afghanistan along with his nephew and a PMC.

2007

- February 7 - Three PMCs were killed when an explosive-packed motorcycle exploded in Kandahar province.
- March 23 - 15 PMCs were killed and four were missing when a convoy transporting logistics for NATO troops was ambushed in Shahwalikot district of Kandahar province.
- April 15 - A suicide bomber killed four PMCs in Spin Boldak district of Kandahar province.
- April 25 - Three PMCs were killed when Taliban fighters stormed a road construction company site near the main highway between Kabul and Kandahar.
- May 17 - A roadside bomb struck the vehicle of a private security company in Kandahar killing four PMCs.
- May 30 - A roadside bomb struck the vehicle of a private security company in the province of Helmand killing two PMCs.
- July 16 - A suicide bomber killed one PMC in Kandahar.
- July 18 - In Loghar, near Kabul, a shooting attack occurred near an office which gives security advice; the attack left a PMC and his driver working for a non-governmental organisation dead.
- July 21 - Four PMCs were killed in an ambush in Farah province.
- July 30 - Taliban militants killed 10 PMCs in the south of the country.
- August 18 - A suicide bomber killed four PMCs in Kandahar along with 11 civilians.
- August 22 - A suicide bomber killed one PMC in Khost.
- August 23 - 10 PMCs were killed when a convoy transporting logistics for NATO troops was ambushed in Zabul province.
- September 3 - A landmine explosion killed six PMCs in Kunar province.
- September 20 - Militants killed one PMC in Zabul province.
- September 23 - Three PMCs were accidentally killed by U.S. soldiers. Three other PMCs were captured in a Taliban attack.
- September 30 - Militants killed one PMC in Ghazni province.
- December 18 - Taliban militants killed 15 PMC's in an ambush near the town of Bala Boluk in the province of Farah.
- December 30 - Taliban militants killed six PMCs in an ambush on their convoy on Afghanistan's main highway in Wardak province.

2008

- January 14 – An attack by Taliban commandos on a popular luxury hotel in Kabul left six people dead, including two PMCs.
- February 23 – Seven PMCs were killed by a roadside bomb.
- April 8 – 18 PMCs were killed when militants attacked them in Zabul province.
- July 7 – Six PMCs were killed in a Taliban attack.
- July 18 – Various Taliban attacks in the country killed seven PMCs.
- July 21 – Four PMCs were killed when their food convoy was ambushed.
- August 17 - Nine PMCs were killed when a NATO supply convoy was ambushed.
- September 12 - Five PMCs were killed and three were captured when a convoy transporting logistics for NATO troops was ambushed in Farah province.
- September 21 - Two PMCs were killed in a Taliban attack.
- September 25 - 11 PMCs were killed when Taliban militants attacked Indian workers constructing a dam in Herat province.
- October 10 - Two PMCs were killed in an ambush in Farah province.
- October 26 - 24 PMCs were killed in a NATO air strike in Ghazni province.
- November 30 - One PMC was killed by a roadside bomb in Kandahar province.
- December 28 - One PMC was killed in a Taliban attack.

2009

- February 5 – Six PMCs, guarding the governor of Musa Qala district, were killed by a roadside bomb in Helmand province.
- March 19 – Three PMCs, guarding an Afghan lawmaker, were killed by a roadside bomb in Helmand province. The lawmaker and a senior policeman were also killed.
- April 1 – Ten people were killed, including one PMC, in a Taliban attack on a provincial council building in Kandahar.
- April 20 – One PMC was killed by a roadside bomb in Oruzgan province.
- April 25 – Three PMCs were killed by suicide bombers targeting the governor's offices in Kandahar province.
- April 26 – Two PMCs were killed in a Taliban attack.
- May 2 - One PMC was killed along with an American PMC in a Taliban attack.
- May 4 – Various Taliban attacks in the country killed nine PMCs.
- May 28 – Four PMCs were killed in an ambush in Herat province.
- June 1 – 10 PMCs were killed in an ambush in Farah province.
- June 2 – 10 PMCs were killed in an ambush in Paktia province.
- June 5 – One PMC was killed in fighting in Khost province.
- June 6 – Three PMCs were killed in an ambush in Nimroz province.
- June 7 – Four PMCs were killed in an ambush in Paktika province.
- July 11 - Various Taliban attacks in the country killed five PMCs.
- June 12 - Four PMCs were killed in a Taliban attack.
- June 13 - Nine PMCs were killed by a suicide bomber in Helmand province.
- June 28 - One PMC was killed in an ambush of a logistics convoy in Andar.
- July 2 - Four PMCs were killed by a roadside bomb in Khost province.
- July 12 - Four PMCs were killed in an ambush in Ghazni province.
- July 14 - Three PMCs were killed by a roadside bomb in Helmand province.
- July 25 - Three PMCs were killed by a landmine in Helmand province.
- July 28 - Various Taliban attacks in the country killed nine PMCs.
- July 30 - Four PMCs were killed by a roadside bomb in Helmand province.
- August 4 - Three PMCs were killed in an accidental explosion in Ghazni province.
- September 12 - Six PMCs were killed when Taliban fighters attacked their offices in Kunar province.
- October 2 - A PMC was killed by another South African PMC in Helmand province.
- October 5 - Two PMCs, guarding a businessman, were killed in Kabul.
- October 9 - Six PMCs were killed by a suicide bomber in Paktia province.
- November 16 - Four PMCs were killed when Taliban fighters attacked a bridge construction project in Kunduz province.

2013

- March 1 – Seven PMCs were killed by a roadside bomb in Konar province.

Total
Based on the above listed reports, an estimated 356 private security guards were killed, six were missing and three were captured during the war.
