= 2011 Mazar-i-Sharif attack =

2011 riot against a UN mission in Mazar-i-Sharif, Afghanistan

- Date: 1 April 2011
- Location: Mazar-i-Sharif, Afghanistan; 36°42′N 67°07′E
- Deaths: At least 14
- Injuries: 20

The 2011 Mazar-i-Sharif attack occurred on 1 April 2011 when a group of demonstrators attacked the United Nations Assistance Mission in Afghanistan (UNAMA) compound in Mazar-i-Sharif, Afghanistan, killing seven foreigners, including three United Nations staff members and four Nepalese guards. Additionally, five protesters died in the violence.

== Incident ==
=== Antecedent ===
The violence began as a protest against the burning of the Quran in the United States, overseen by an American pastor, Terry Jones, on 20 March 2011. The incident was denounced by President Hamid Karzai in a press release on 24 March, and again in a speech on 31 March. News report that most Afghans learned of the incident through Karzai's announcement.

=== Riot ===
A riot erupted in Mazar-i-Sharif on 1 April 2011 during the protest over the burning of the Qur'an in the US. Estimates of the number of protesters ranged from "hundreds" to as many as 2,000. The protest began near the city's Blue Mosque shortly after Friday prayer, with protesters chanting "Death to the USA, death to Israel." During the sermon, which is part of the Friday prayer, worshipers were told by three mullahs to begin protesting in favor of the arrest of Pastor Terry Jones, who led the Qur'an burning.

Atta Muhammad Nur, the provincial governor of Balkh, said that some Taliban insurgents were among the protesters who used the event as an opportunity. Protesters were able to overwhelm forces of the Afghan National Police and UN guards; a local police official said that "[police] tried to stop them, but protesters began stoning the building and finally the situation got out of control." The mob burned down a part of the United Nations compound, toppled guard towers and heaved blocks of cement down from the walls. It was reported that the victims were killed by weapons that the demonstrators had wrestled away from the United Nations guards. Around twenty seven people, who Nur said were "insurgents," were later arrested.

Afghan National Security Forces turned down an offer of assistance from PRT Mazar-i-Sharif during the protests, according to Krister Bringéus at Sweden's Embassy in Kabul.

=== Casualties ===
A UN spokesperson said that "three international UNAMA (United Nations Assistance Mission in Afghanistan) staff members were killed, and four international armed security guards were killed." Two of the UN dead were reported to have been beheaded. It was the deadliest attack ever against United Nations personnel in Afghanistan.

The three UN staff workers who were killed were Swedish human rights officer Joakim Dungel, Romanian political affairs officer Filaret Motco, and military advisor and Royal Norwegian Air Force officer Lt. Colonel Siri Skare. The four Nepalese guards who lost their lives defending the compound were Dil Prasad Gurung, Chhabi Lal Purja Pun, Min Bahadur Thapa, and Narayan Bahadur Thapa Magar.

In addition, five protesters were killed, with twenty wounded.

== Response ==
After the incident, a state of emergency was declared in Mazar-i-Sharif. Roads near the city were blocked, and cars were inspected by army and police forces. Staffan de Mistura, the senior UN representative in Afghanistan, traveled to Mazar-i-Sharif hours after the incident.

UN regulations state that after attacks on UN-personnel, recall of staff, and suspension of UN operations, have to be considered. Previously, an attack in 2009, which killed five UN workers, led to temporary relocation of workers to Dubai. Despite these regulations, a spokesperson said that there was "not a question of us pulling out. The U.N. is here to stay."

== Reactions ==
- United Nations Secretary-General Ban Ki-moon said that the incident was "an outrageous and cowardly attack against UN staff, which cannot be justified under any circumstances and I condemn it in the strongest possible terms."
- Afghanistan Taliban spokesman Zabiullah Mujahid said "The Taliban had nothing to do with this, it was a pure act of responsible Muslims."
- United States President Barack Obama said in a statement that "I condemn in the strongest possible terms the attack on the United Nations Assistance Mission in Afghanistan [...] I offer my deepest condolences to those injured and killed, as well as to their loved ones." United States legislators, including Senate Majority Leader Harry Reid, also condemned both the burning and the violence in reaction to it.

== U.S. involvement claims ==
On 4 September 2012, a Norwegian journalist claimed to have discovered secret Swedish documents which proved that the masses were guided by Afghan agents, hired by the U.S. military, to turn in the direction of the UN headquarters to avert an attack on the American consulate. This according to a classified report done by the Swedish foreign ministry. This was featured in the Norwegian television channel NRK Brennpunkt documentary "Hvem Drepte Siri og Joakim (Who killed Siri and Joakim)".

The Norwegian foreign ministry subsequently made a request to the Swedish foreign ministry about the report and received a copy. Norwegian State Secretary Gry Larsen said there were no grounds in the report to say that the Americans intentionally asked the demonstrators to go to the UN offices. Brennpunkt documentary director Odd Isungseth said the documentary never portrayed it as the Americans leading the protestors to the UN offices but that their Afghan agents actions to divert the mob is what caused them to go in the direction that led to the UN fatalities.
