= Provincial Reconstruction Team Meymaneh =

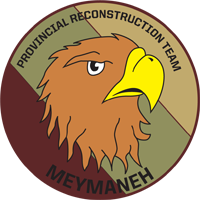
- Insignia of PRT Meymaneh
- Active: 2004–2012
- Country: Norway, Latvia, Macedonia, Iceland, United States
- Branch: Land/Air Forces
- Type: Light Motorised Task Force/Civilian components/Role 2 medical facility/aeromedical detachment
- Role: Reconstruction/Partnering/Mentoring
- Size: as at March 2010: approximately 400 soldiers and civilians
- Garrison/HQ: Faryab province, Meymaneh
- Motto: One Team – One Mission

Commanders
- Last commander: Colonel Odd Andreas Søbstad

The Provincial Reconstruction Team in Meymaneh was an International Security Assistance Force (ISAF) command; it existed between 2004 and 2012. It was classified by NATO, as a "Provincial Reconstruction Team". It consisted of soldiers and civilians from Norway, Latvia, Macedonia, Iceland and the United States. It conducts joint operations with Afghan Security Forces in Faryab province. It is led by ISAF and began its work in 2004 when they took over from the British. The camp was moved out of the city due to several attacks and a lack of space, in 2006. It is co-located with the airstrip, north of Meymaneh. Several "FOBs" are located in Ghormach and Qeysar districts, which the PRT share with Afghan soldiers.

== Overview ==
The PRT Meymaneh focuses on security operations with Afghan security forces who they 'partner'. Their joint mission is to establish a secure and safe environment for Afghan society. Since the Taliban were defeated by the Northern Alliance in 2001 and withdrew from the region, ISAF took control. Towards 2010, the Afghan Army and security forces have increased numerically and the provincial government was given more influence.

In Faryab Coalition forces are out to show their presence, talk to the locals to gather information, and ensure that insurgents do not interfere with daily life. Operations are run frequently, both civilian and military. PRT Meymaneh was given control of security over the district in 2008, but some of the area is still under the control of insurgents. The Ring Road, which connects Afghanistan, is still not finished in Ghormach district.

== Operations ==
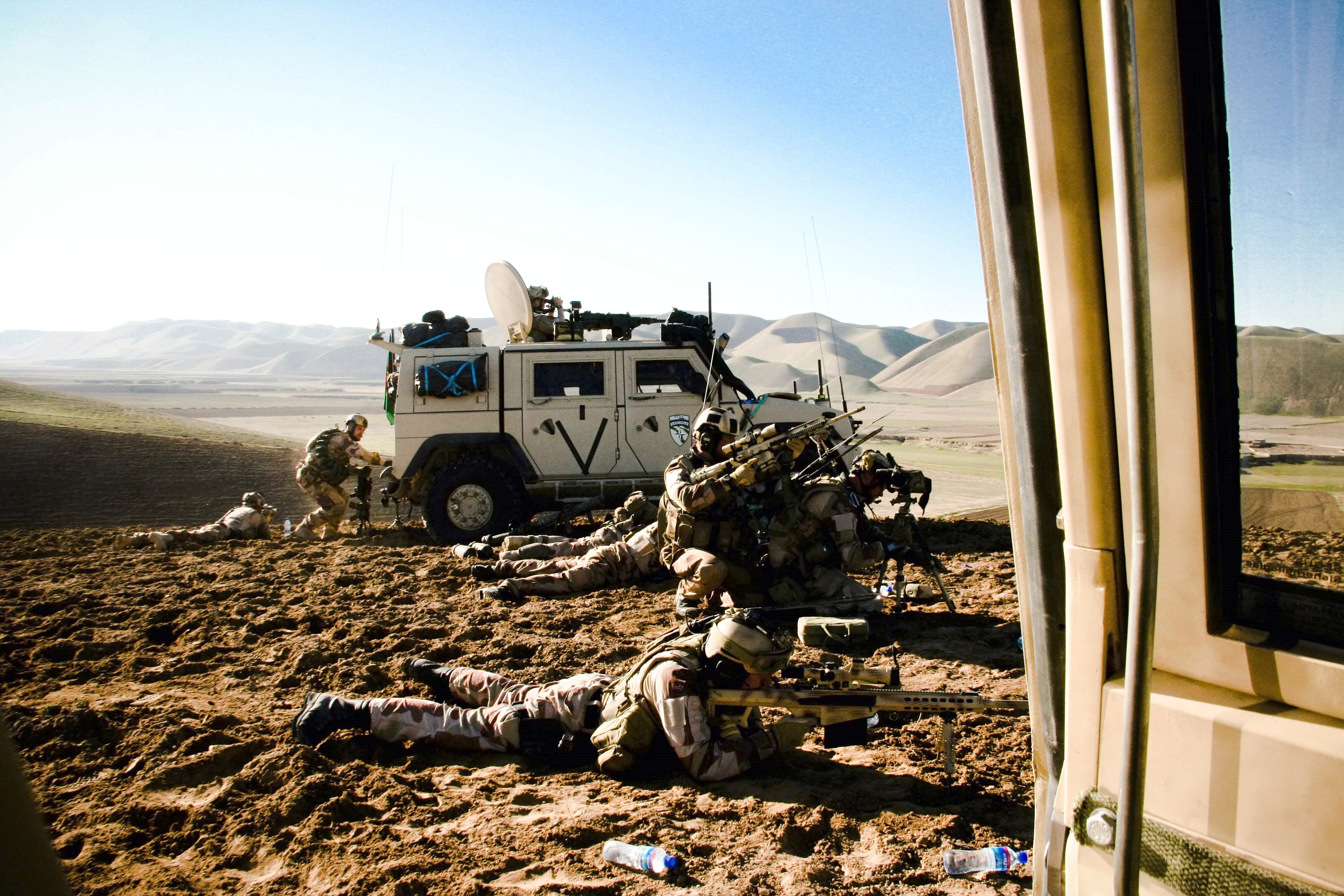
Norwegian soldiers

To prevent insurgents from disrupting security Coalition and Afghan Security Forces have conducted 'partnered' operations in Faryab on an almost daily basis since 2004; Coalition forces train and supervise the Afghans.

Most operations conducted in the PRT's area are led by the Afghans; while the PRT coordinate and plans, Afghan soldiers work in the field. Coalition soldiers are employed as a supporting force and are in charge of security. Norwegian Operation Mentoring and Liaison Teams train officers in the Afghan Army.

Norwegian soldiers have met a lot of resistance from insurgents in 2010. Between December 2009 and February 2010, soldiers from the PRT engaged insurgents in several places in Faryab province. One firefight north of the capital lasted over six hours, but no injuries or damage were reported.

In March 2010, the PRT, with the provincial government and Afghan Security Forces launched Operation Chashme Naw (New Source in dari Persian). The aim of the operation is to improve security in the north and northwest of the province.

== Organization ==
The PRT consists of soldiers and civilian personnel. At least 2 soldiers from Finland, were employed by the unit in 2007 (including the unit's executive officer and one soldier who was killed on duty).

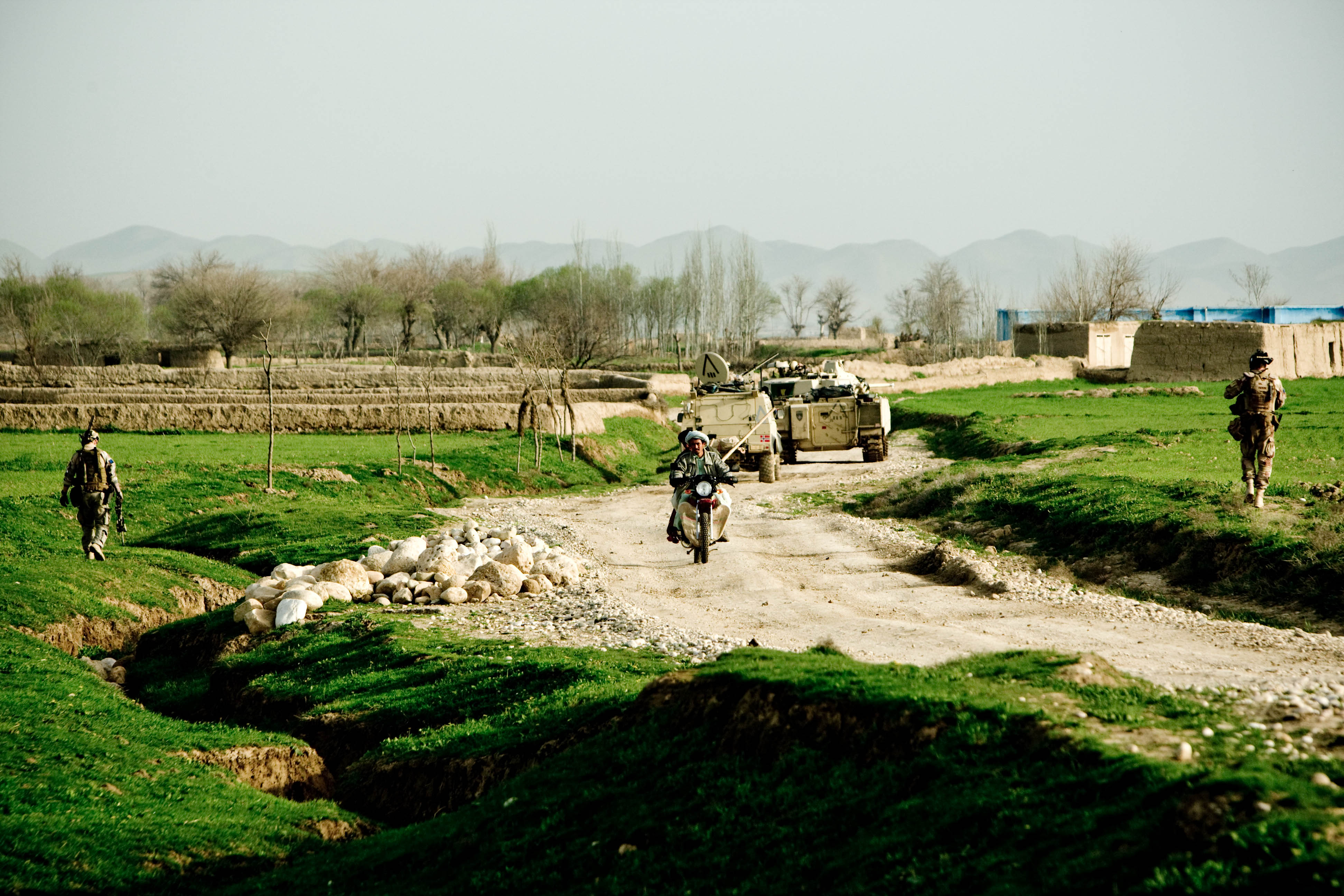
Norwegian soldiers on patrol in Faryab province

=== Task Unit ===
The Task Unit consists of conventional and mechanized infantry from either the Telemark Battalion, Norwegian Army 2nd Battalion or the Norwegian Army Armoured Battalion. The soldiers use Iveco LMV armored vehicles, CV9030 combat vehicles, and ATV all-terrain vehicles to maneuver in the hilly and rough terrain in Faryab. The Task Unit also includes snipers, mortar teams, EOD bomb disposal experts, and combat engineers. From December 2011, the Latvian Army will deliver soldiers to the Task Unit.

=== ISTAR task group ===
The ISTAR task group handles information and intelligence. They operate in the province as Military Observation Teams with light vehicles such as the MB 270/290 (Mercedes Benz G-class 270/90) and ATVs.

=== Medical company ===
The medical company contains a ROLE 2 medical treatment facility and a platoon of medical evacuation soldiers in SISU armored vehicles. This unit has two surgical teams from Macedonia and the United States and has pharmaceutical, laboratory, X-Ray and dental capabilities. The medical evacuation teams follow other units in the field. Medical soldiers are only allowed to use personal weapons in self-defense and to defend patients.

From 2011, the medical doctors employed by Norway's military, will not be working at civilian hospitals in Afghanistan, according to recommendations from Forsvarsstaben.

=== CSS company ===
The Combat Service Support Company provides the PRT with technical repair and maintenance services and logistics. They often deliver supplies to units who are deployed in the field and frequently accompany the troops to be able to repair their vehicles and equipment. The CSS company drives Scania P93, P113, P143 trucks and the 412 rescue and recovery vehicle. The CSS also runs the kitchen in the camp.

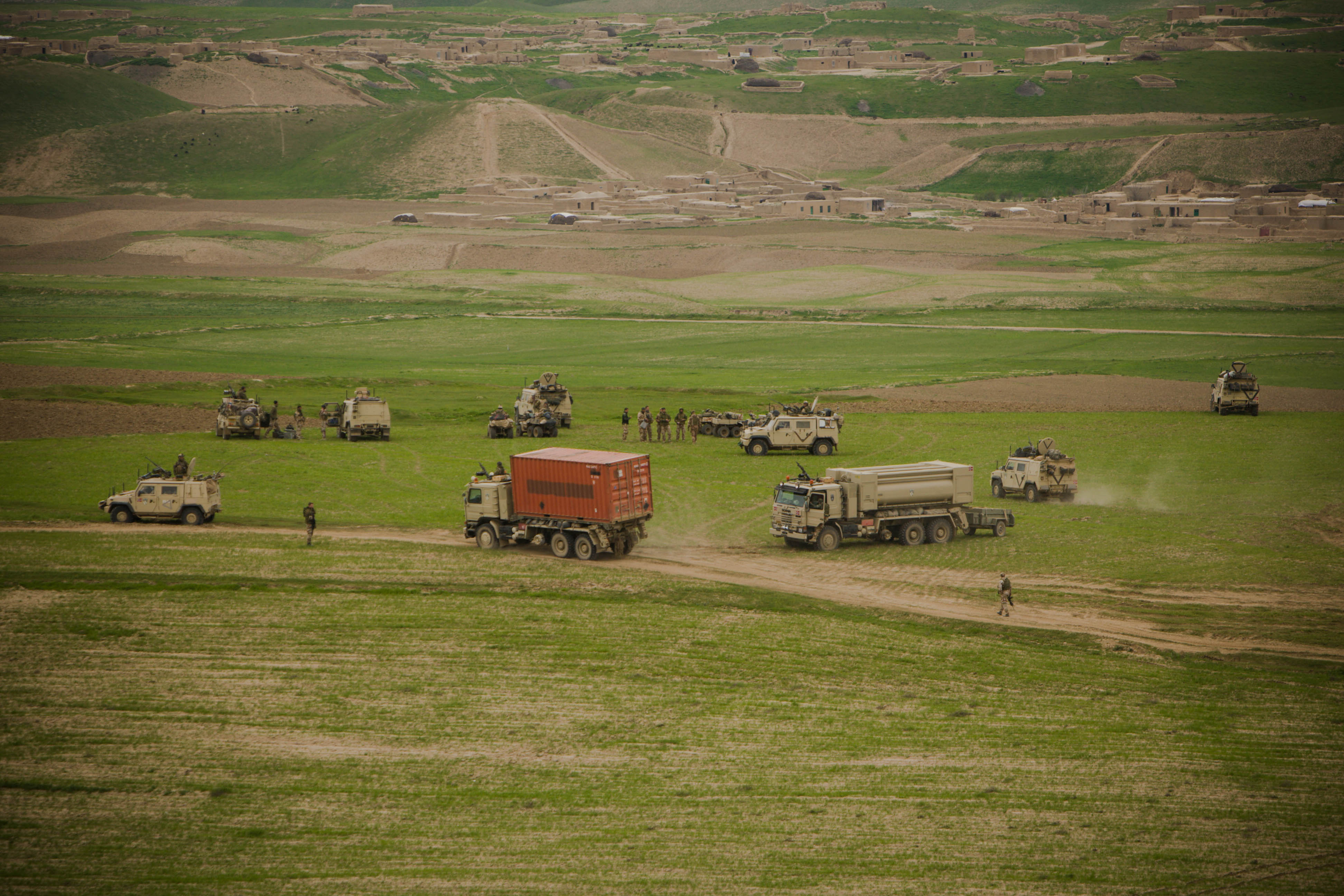
The CSS company delivering supplies to units in the field in Faryab province

=== Force Protection ===
The Force protection company is found from soldiers from Latvia. As well as serving in that role for the PRT, they are also often used to escort convoys. From December 2011, The Royal Norwegian Air Force are responsible for the delivery for soldiers to Force Protection in the PRT Meymaneh.

=== NAD ===
The Norwegian Aeromedical Detachment was deployed in PRT Meymaneh between April 2008 and October 2012 with three Bell 412 helicopters and crew on 24 hours standby for evacuating patients from the field. One of the helicopters was armed with two Miniguns to provide close protection. 100,000 flight hours with the Norwegian Bell 412 was commemorated in December 2009 in Meymaneh. The helicopter deployment ended after 4,5 years in October 2012 with 245 missions completed evacuating a total of 270 people. A two-part documentary named "Livredderne i Afghanistan (Lifesavers in Afghanistan)" about NAD was produced by Bitmill for Viasat 4 in 2010.

=== Staff ===
This unit contains the staff comparable to a normal NATO standard battalion. They make the decisions on operations and planning and make sure that all of the soldiers are working well.

=== Civilian components ===
The PRT also includes civilian coordinators from the respective nations. USAID, which works for the US embassy in Afghanistan, is stationed in Meymaneh. Norwegian Police work with their Afghan Police Force counterparts. Norwegian and Icelandic development and political advisors and members of the Norwegian Prison service are co-located in the PRT to provide support for the prisons in the province.

== Casualties ==
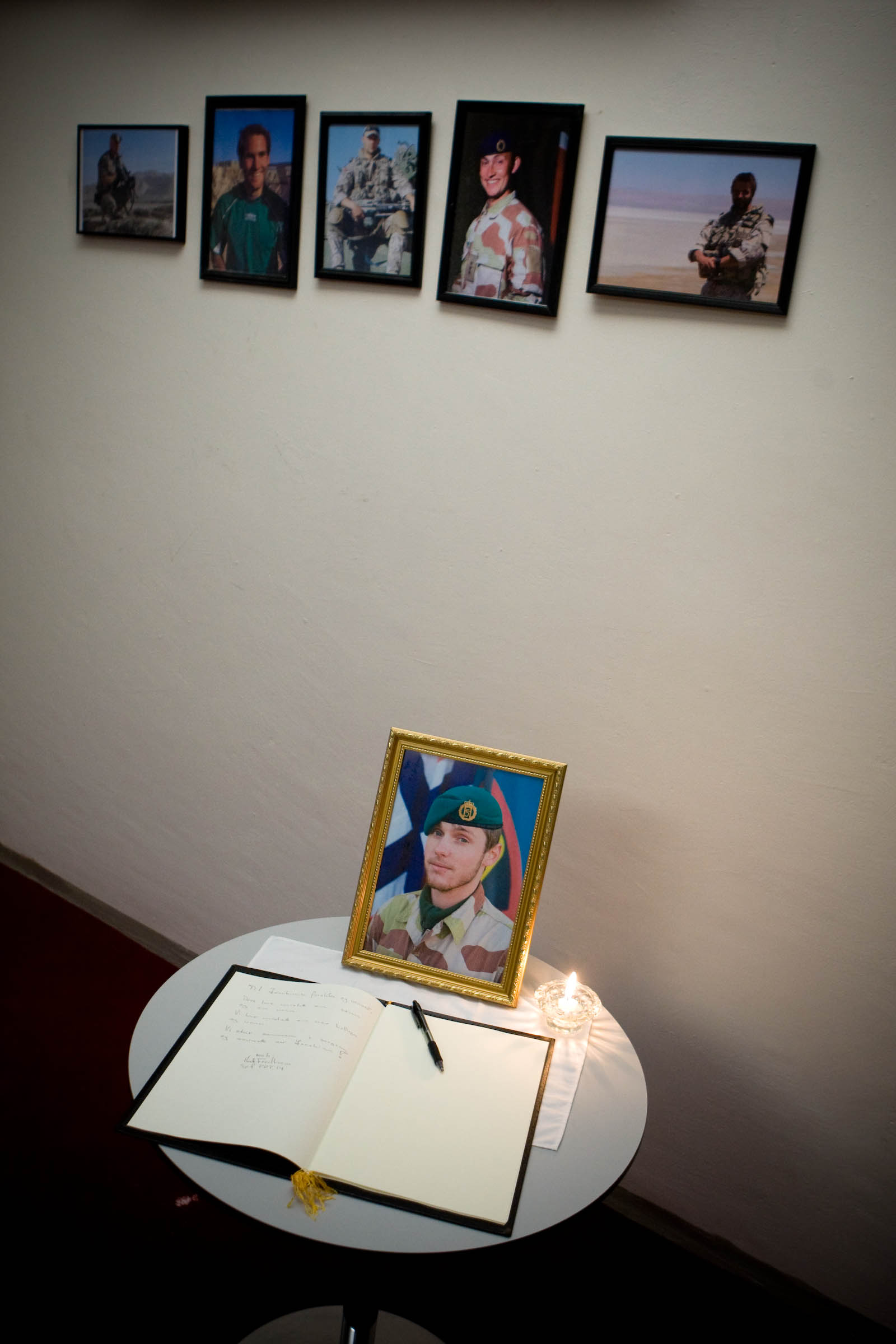
Book of condolences for one of the unit's soldiers who was killed on duty.

Members of the unit were killed on the following dates:

- One soldier from Finland died on 23 May 2007 of his injuries after an IED strike outside the local hospital in Meymaneh city. Three other Norwegian soldiers were wounded.
- One soldier from Norway died on 8 November 2007 when his vehicle hit an IED outside the camp. His fellow soldier in the car was mortally wounded, but was rescued by Norwegian soldiers. The deceased was affiliated with the National Home Guard.
- Edgars Ozoliņš from Latvia died on 11 August 2008 in an IED attack in Meymaneh city. Three other Latvian soldiers were wounded.
- Dāvis Baltābols from Latvia died on 9 August 2009 in Germany after serious exhaustion in a firefight in Faryab province.
- Private Claes Joachim Olsson from Norway died on 25 January 2010 when the CV9030 he was driving went over an IED in Ghormach district. Other soldiers in the vehicle escaped with mild bruising. The deceased was affiliated with the Telemark Battalion.
- Lieutenant commander Trond André Bolle from Norway died on 27 June 2010 when an Iveco LMV went over an IED in Almar district. All the 4 soldiers in the vehicle were killed.
- Lieutenant Christian Lian from Norway died on 27 June 2010 when an Iveco LMV went over an IED in Almar district. All the 4 soldiers in the vehicle were killed.
- Second lieutenant Simen Tokle from Norway died on 27 June 2010 when an Iveco LMV went over an IED in Almar district. All the 4 soldiers in the vehicle were killed.
- Quartermaster Andreas Eldjarn from Norway died on 27 June 2010 when an Iveco LMV went over an IED in Almar district. All the 4 soldiers in the vehicle were killed.

== Awards and decorations ==
Norwegian, Latvian, Macedonian and US soldiers all receive the non-article five medal after 30 days service in ISAF. The Norwegian soldiers also receive the International Operations medal after 90 days of service.

== Contributors ==
Soldiers of the PRT in Meymaneh are recruited from their respective nations' armed forces, the Norwegian Army is in charge of training the military contingents before deployment. Civilians come from the Ministry of Foreign Affairs (Norway), the Ministry of Justice and Police, the Icelandic Government and USAID. The aeromedical detachment is provided by the Norwegian Air Force.

== Unit commanders ==
- Lieutenant Colonel Arne Opperud (May 2007)
- Lieutenant Colonel Ivar Knotten (December 2008 – June 2009)
- Lieutenant Colonel Ivar Omsted (June 2009 - December 2009)
- Colonel Knut Fredheim. (December 2009 – June 2010)
- Colonel Rune Solberg (June 2010 – December 2010)
- Colonel Fred Arne Jacobsen (December 2010 – June 2011)
- Colonel Lars Huse (June 2011 – December 2011)
- Colonel Torger Gillebo (December 2011 – June 2012)
- Colonel Odd Andreas Søbstad (June 2012 – September 2012)
