= Republic of Korea Armed Forces overseas casualties =

- This page records hostile and non-hostile overseas casualties of the Republic of Korea Armed Forces since the end of the Vietnam War.
- The star sign indicates that there are uncertainty of measuring exact age due to Korean age system.
- The rank is honored posthumously in most cases. The rank system of Republic of Korea Armed Forces will be recognized.
- The cause of death is the official conclusion of the Republic of Korea Armed Forces.
- The place of death is recorded as the official name when the event has taken.

Date	Personal Information		Military Information			Casualty Information		Notes
Date	Name (Last First)	Age	Rank	Unit	Branch	Cause of Death	Place of Death	Notes
1995-09-13	Choe Myeong-seok	36*	Joongryeong (LTC)	United Nations Observer Mission in Georgia	Republic of Korea Army	non-hostile - natural disaster	Pitsunda, Autonomous Republic of Abkhazia, Georgia	
2002-05-12	Jeong Kyeong-moon	40*	Joongryeong (LTC)	United Nations Military Observer Group in India and Pakistan	Republic of Korea Army	non-hostile - illness	Seongnam, Gyeonggi Province, Republic of Korea	
2003-01-27	Kim Hyo-seong	33*	Daewi (CPT)	924th Medical Assistance Unit, International Security Assistance Force	Republic of Korea Army	non-hostile - friendly fire	Bagram, Parwan Province, Islamic Republic of Afghanistan	
2003-03-06	Min Byeong-jo	38*	Joongryeong (LTC)	Task Force Sangroksu, United Nations Mission in East Timor	Republic of Korea Army	non-hostile - natural disaster	Oecusse District, Democratic Republic of Timor-Leste	
2003-03-06	Bak Jin-gyu	35*	Joongryeong (LTC)	Task Force Sangroksu, United Nations Mission in East Timor	Republic of Korea Army	non-hostile - natural disaster	Oecusse District, Democratic Republic of Timor-Leste	
2003-03-06	Kim Jeong-joong	22*	Byeongjang (SGT)	Task Force Sangroksu, United Nations Mission in East Timor	Republic of Korea Army	non-hostile - natural disaster	Oecusse District, Democratic Republic of Timor-Leste	
2003-03-06	Baek Jong-hoon	23*	Byeongjang (SGT)	Task Force Sangroksu, United Nations Mission in East Timor	Republic of Korea Army	non-hostile - natural disaster	Oecusse District, Democratic Republic of Timor-Leste	
2003-03-06	Choe Heui	22*	Byeongjang (SGT)	Task Force Sangroksu, United Nations Mission in East Timor	Republic of Korea Army	non-hostile - natural disaster	Oecusse District, Democratic Republic of Timor-Leste	
2007-02-27	Yoon Jang-ho	26	Hasa (SSG)	100th Construction Engineer Unit, International Security Assistance Force	Republic of Korea Army	hostile - suicide bomb	Bagram, Parwan Province, Islamic Republic of Afghanistan	
2007-05-19	Oh Jong-soo	25	Joongwi (1LT)	Zaytun Division, Multi-National Force – Iraq	Republic of Korea Army	non-hostile - suicide	Erbil, Iraqi Kurdistan, Republic of Iraq	
2008-03-03	Bak Hyeong-jin	50*	Daeryeong (COL)	United Nations Mission in Nepal	Republic of Korea Army	non-hostile - helicopter crash	Ramechhap District, Federal Democratic Republic of Nepal	
2014-04-15	Ha (first name unknown)	22*	Hasa (PO1)	Task Force Cheonghae, Combined Task Force 151	Republic of Korea Navy	missing in action	off Mukalla, Republic of Yemen, Gulf of Aden	
