= 2014 Bagram Airfield bombing =

2014 suicide bombing in Afghanistan

2014 Bagram suicide bombing
- Part of War in Afghanistan (2001–2021)
- Location of Parwan Province in Afghanistan
- Location: Bagram, Parwan Province, Afghanistan
- Date: July 8, 2014; 5:15 (UTC)
- Target: Afghan-ISAF reconnaissance patrol
- Attack type: Suicide bombing
- Weapon: Explosives
- Deaths: Total: 17+: 5 Czech soldiers; (Afghanistan) 2 Afghan policemen; 10 Afghan civilians
- Perpetrator: (Afghanistan) Taliban

On 8 July 2014, a Taliban suicide bomber riding a bicycle attacked a joint Afghan-ISAF reconnaissance mission in the vicinity of Qalandar Khel village in front of the Korean Clinic.

== Events ==
The attack occurred at approximately 5:15 (UTC) A.M., as the Czech soldiers along with Afghan police, were assessing the security situation in the village in the vicinity of Bagram Airfield. The bomber was in a crowd of Afghans talking to the soldiers who were investigating rocket attacks against Bagram airbase. Two days prior, a rocket had been fired at the base from the nearby village of Qalandar Khil. At least 17 people died on site in the suicide bombing, including 10 Afghan civilians, 2 Afghan police officers, and 4 Czech soldiers. A fifth Czech soldier died of wounds six days later in a Prague military hospital.

== Fatalities ==
Five Czech ISAF soldiers were killed, of the Czech Afghanistan Contingent.

Date	Name	Rank	Age	Unit	Branch	Region	City	Cause	Place of Death	Died In
7-14-2014	Lieskovan, Jaroslav	Rotmistr (Sergeant First Class)	39	2nd Czech Force Protection Company	Czech Army	Pardubice	Chrudim	Hostile - hostile fire	Prague	Czech Republic
7-08-2014	Beneš, David	Rotmistr (Sergeant First Class)	28	2nd Czech Force Protection Company	Czech Army	Pardubice	Chrudim	Hostile - hostile fire	Bagram Air Force Base	Afghanistan
7-08-2014	Šenkýr, Jan	Desátník (Corporal)	39	43rd airborne battalion	Czech Army	Ústí nad Labem	Žatec	Hostile - hostile fire	Bagram Air Force Base	Afghanistan
7-08-2014	Ligac, Libor	Desátník (Corporal)	32	2nd Czech Force Protection Company	Czech Army	Pardubice	Chrudim	Hostile - hostile fire	Bagram Air Force Base	Afghanistan
7-08-2014	Klusák, Ivo	Četař (Sergeant)	33	2nd Czech Force Protection Company	Czech Army	Pardubice	Chrudim	Hostile - hostile fire	Bagram Air Force Base	Afghanistan

== See also ==
- 2007 Bagram Airfield bombing
- 2015 Bagram Airfield bombing
- 2016 Bagram Airfield bombing
