= Yoon Jang-ho =

South Korean soldier (1980–2007)

- Born: September 21, 1980; Seoul, South Korea
- Died: February 27, 2007 (aged 26); Bagram Airfield, Afghanistan
- Military career
- Allegiance: South Korea
- Branch: Republic of Korea Army
- Unit: Special Warfare Command
- Conflicts: War in Afghanistan: Bagram Airfield bombing †

Yoon Jang-ho (Korean: 윤장호; Hanja: 尹章豪; September 21, 1980 – February 27, 2007) was a South Korean soldier.

Yoon was staff sergeant (posthumous) serving as an English translator in Afghanistan as a member of the Task Force Dasan, a dispatched engineering unit of the Republic of Korea Army. He was killed during the suicide bomb attack on a military base in Bagram on February 27, 2007. The attack occurred at the front gate, where he was waiting to greet two local residents into the base.

== Early life and education ==
Born on September 21, 1980, Yoon Jang-ho was the youngest of three children. After graduating from elementary school in Seoul in 1994, he received secondary education in New York. He graduated from the Kelley School of Business at Indiana University with an undergraduate degree in business in 2003 and started attending the Southern Baptist Theological Seminary in early 2004.

== Career ==
In December 2004, Yoon returned to South Korea and joined the South Korean army's Special Warfare Command as a translator in June 2005. He was dispatched to Afghanistan in September 2006, and was to return to South Korea on March 14, 2007, for a planned discharge in June. He was promoted to staff sergeant and received the Inheon Order of Military Merit and the Bronze Star posthumously.

== See also ==
- Republic of Korea Armed Forces overseas casualties
