= 2016 Bagram Airfield bombing =

Suicide bombing in Bagram, Afghanistan

- Part of War in Afghanistan (2001–2021)
- Location of Parwan Province in Afghanistan
- Location: 34.946111°N 69.265°E; Bagram, Parwan Province, Afghanistan
- Date: 12 November 2016; 05:30 am (UTC+04:30)
- Target: Bagram Airfield
- Attack type: Suicide bombing
- Weapon: Explosive belt
- Deaths: 5 (+1 bomber)
- Injuries: 18
- Perpetrator: Taliban
- Motive: American occupation of Afghanistan

The 2016 Bagram bombing took place on November 12, 2016, when a suicide bomber managed to penetrate the security layer of Bagram Airfield, which was at the time the largest U.S. military base in Afghanistan located about 45 km north of Kabul, detonating his vest near a group of soldiers who were en route to Modern Army Combatives Training. Four U.S. citizens were killed (2 soldiers and 2 contractors, while at least 17 others were injured, including 16 Americans and 1 Polish citizen. One injured soldier died a month later from complications due to injuries sustained in the blast, raising the total killed to 5.

== Attack ==
According to Abdul Wahid Sediqi, spokesman for the governor of Parwan Province Mohammad Asim Asim, the attacker was employed by a subcontractor of Virginia-based engineering and construction firm Fluor Corporation. He had been constructing the vest over a period of time on the base. After successfully passing through at least one checkpoint, he approached a sidewalk where a group of soldiers were gathering prior to the Veteran's Day running event, detonated his explosive vest around 05:38 local time. Two U.S. soldiers and two U.S. private contractors were killed, in addition to the bomber. Among the 17 injured were 16 U.S. service members and one Polish soldier.

The bombing was the deadliest single incident involving U.S. troops since a December 2015 suicide attack at the same base which killed six troops.

== Aftermath ==
The Taliban claimed responsibility for the bombing in a statement issued by their spokesman Zabiullah Mujahid, confirming the sports ground was the intended target, and adding that the attack had been planned for four months.

In response to the bombing, Bagram Airfield was placed under lockdown, while additional security measures were taken at all other locations in Afghanistan for Resolute Support Mission forces. The Embassy of the United States in Kabul was closed for the following day as a precautionary measure.

== See also ==
- German consulate in Mazar-i-Sharif attack, a suicide truck bombing that took place two days earlier
- 2007 Bagram Airfield bombing
- 2014 Bagram Airfield bombing
- 2015 Bagram Airfield bombing
