= 2015 Bagram Airfield bombing =

2015 bombing in Afghanistan

2015 Bagram suicide bombing
- Part of War in Afghanistan (2001–2021)
- Location of Parwan Province in Afghanistan
- Location: Bagram, Parwan Province, Afghanistan
- Date: 21 December 2015
- Deaths: 6
- Injuries: 3
- Perpetrators: Taliban, Suicide bomber named Zahidullah
- Motive: To end foreign occupation of Afghanistan

On 21 December 2015, in Bagram, a suicide bomber blew himself up, killing six NATO service members of a foot patrol.

== Victims ==
All six of the members killed were of American nationality.

- 2015-12-21, Special Agent Adrianna M. Vorderbruggen[897], U.S. Air Force Office of Special Investigations, US Bomb
- 2015-12-21, Special Agent Michael A. Cinco[898], U.S. Air Force Office of Special Investigations, US Bomb
- 2015-12-21, Special Agent Peter W. Taub[899], U.S. Air Force Office of Special Investigations, US Bomb
- 2015-12-21, Special Agent Chester J. McBride[900], U.S. Air Force Office of Special Investigations, US Bomb
- 2015-12-21, Technical Sergeant Joseph G. Lemm[901], U.S. Air Force Security Forces, US Bomb
- 2015-12-21, Staff Sergeant Louis M. Bonocasa[902], U.S. Air Force Security Forces, US Bomb

Zabiullah Mujahid, the spokesperson for the Taliban, claimed they were responsible for the attack via Twitter and e-mail.

== Attack ==
A suicide bomber riding a motorcycle loaded with explosives crashed into a NATO-Afghanistan foot patrol while it was traveling through the village near Bagram Air Base. Six American NATO service members were killed with two other Americans and an Afghan injured.

== Reactions ==
U.S. Secretary of Defense Ash Carter responded to the bombing, stating, "our troops are working diligently alongside our Afghan partners to build a brighter future for the Afghan people. Their dedicated efforts will continue despite this tragic event. Our deepest sympathies go out to the families of these brave Americans who died in service to this vital mission, and our thoughts remain with all of our troops serving overseas during this holiday season so that we may have peace and security at home."

White House Office of the Press Secretary issued a statement, stating "we express our deepest condolences to the families of the six U.S. service members killed and to all of those injured in today’s Taliban attack near Bagram Airfield in Afghanistan. Our thoughts and prayers are with the victims, their families, and their loved ones. The United States condemns this cowardly attack on members of the U.S. and Afghan forces, and we remain committed to supporting the Afghan people and their government. We will continue to work together to promote peace and stability in Afghanistan, just as we will not relent in our mission to counter the threat of terrorism that plagues the region."

== See also ==
- Air Force Office of Special Investigations
- United States Air Force Security Forces
- 2007 Bagram Airfield bombing
- 2014 Bagram Airfield bombing
- 2016 Bagram Airfield bombing
