= Bagram District =

Bagram بگرام
- District
- Location in Afghanistan
- Coordinates: 34°58′00″N 69°17′34″E
- Country: Afghanistan
- Province: Parwan
- Capital: Bagram

Population
  - Religions: Islam
- Time zone: +04:30

Bagram (Dari: بگرام) is a district of Parwan province, Afghanistan. Its seat lies at Bagram, which lies about 60 kilometers north of the capital of Kabul. It borders Kabul District to the south, Shinwari District to the east, and Chaharikar District to the north.

== History ==
Historically this district was known for its rhinoceros hunting. Haji Abdul Qader also commanded some 200 Mujahideen in Bagram District during the war against the Soviet Union, with a permanent base located at Deh Babi near Abdullah-e Burj.

== See also ==
- Districts of Afghanistan
