= 2019 Bagram Airfield attack =

Taliban bombing and attack on a US airfield in Afghanistan

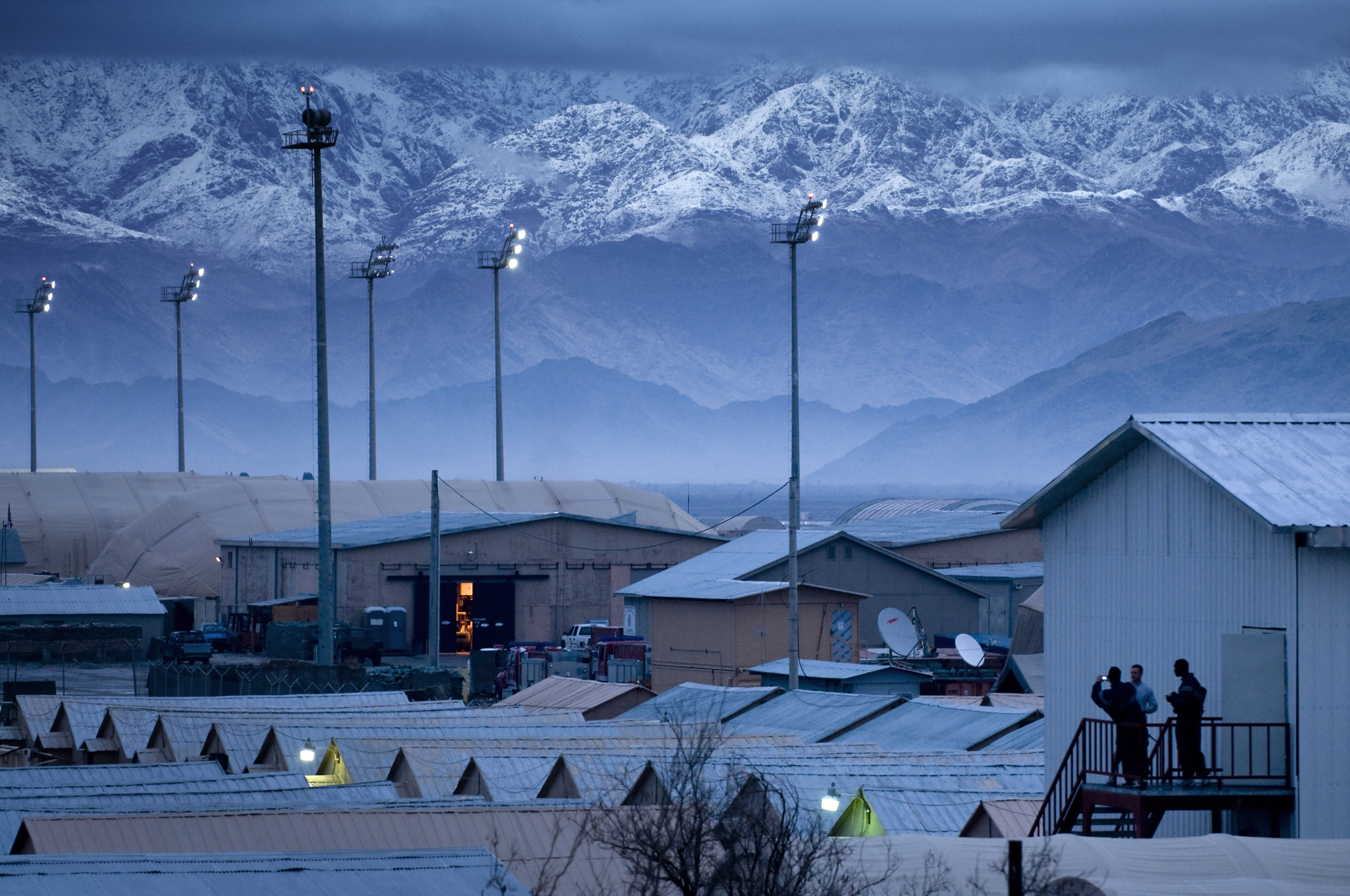
- Bagram Airfield, Afghanistan
- Location: Bagram Airfield
- Date: December 11, 2019
- Weapons: 1 Garbage Truck and suicide attack
- Deaths: 2
- Injuries: 80
- Perpetrator: Taliban
- Defenders: U.S. Marine Corps, U.S. Army, U.S. Air Force, Georgian Army

In the early morning of December 11, 2019, the Taliban attacked Bagram Air Base in Afghanistan, which at the time was controlled by the United States military. The attackers used a VBIED garbage truck with 25,000 pounds (11,000 kg) of home-made explosives which killed two civilians and injured 80 others.

== The attack ==
Taliban insurgents attacked the western part of the base following the explosion. The attack was repelled by a US-led NATO forces. At 5:50 a.m. a 22,500-pound (10,200 kg) VBIED (Vehicle Borne IED) was detonated at Bagram Airfield abandoned medical facility that was walled off separate from the rest of the base.

== American military response ==
Just minutes after the attacks, Marine advisors, U.S. Army Military Police and their Georgian military counterparts responded to the attacks. The Marines and Georgians were in charge of perimeter security for Bagram Airfield Security Forces (BAFSECFOR). The U.S. Army Military Police were in charge of Law Enforcement Operations. At the time of the attack BAFSECFOR was headquartered by the 307th Airborne Engineer Battalion, and organized as Task Force Cobalt.

Task Force Cobalt pushed more combat power to the site of the initial attack, consisting of more marine advisers and elements of 1st Platoon, 348th Engineer Company (Route Clearance), focusing on containing Taliban fighters from entering the main portion of the base. Heavy small arms fire and rockets could be heard In the area of the initial car bomb but Taliban fighters were unsuccessful from entering the main portion of the base.

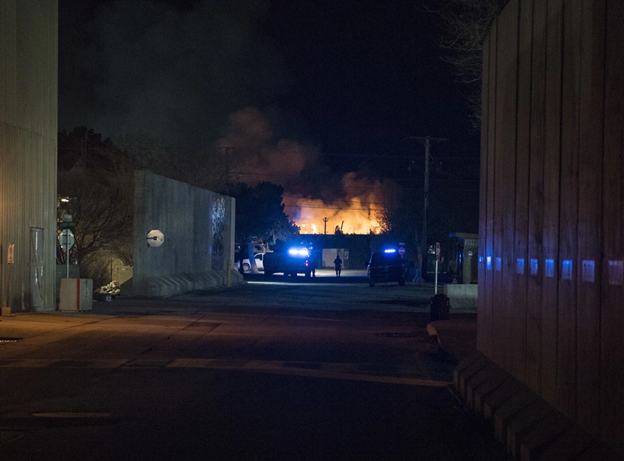
Complex Attack on BAGRAM Air Base Dec 11 2019 DVIDS

16 hours after the initial attack, himars launched two missiles then 2 US F-16 fighter aircraft from the 79th FGS out of Shaw AFB SC assessed the area outside of the military base colloquially known as the Korean hospital, due to its former usage by the South Korean military.

Following the attack HHC, 307th AEB coordinated the closing of the breach in the perimeter created by the initial blast and subsequent bombings by US Forces. The 244th Engineer Company, a National Guard unit hailing from Hagerstown, Maryland, took mission command to repair the breach in Bagram's perimeter wall utilizing organic equipment.
