= Mir Zakah =

Coordinates: 33°46′00″N 69°29′00″E

Mir Zakah (Pashto: میر زکاه) is a village in the Mirzaka District of Paktia Province in eastern Afghanistan, and on the old caravan route from Ghazni to Gandhara. Mauryan punch-marked coins have been discovered at Begram and Mir Zakah, indicating early trade or administrative presence in the region.

Two of the largest ancient coin deposits ever attested to, were discovered in the village, in 1947 and 1992. The hoards contained over half a million punch-marked coins dating from the late 5th century BC, to the 1st century AD, containing early Indian bent-bar and punch-marked coins, Greek, Graeco-Bactrian, Indo-Greek, Indo-Scythian, Indo-Parthian, and Kushana origins coins. The hoards were plundered in later years, and seen being openly sold, in February 1994, in the Peshawar bazaar. The village he controversial Alexander Medaillon is said to have come from the treasure looted at Mir Zakah between 1992 and 1993.

== See also ==
- Destruction of art in Afghanistan # Mir Zakah Treasure
