= Attempted assassination of Dick Cheney =

2007 suicide attack in Afghanistan

Coordinates: 34.946°N 69.265°E

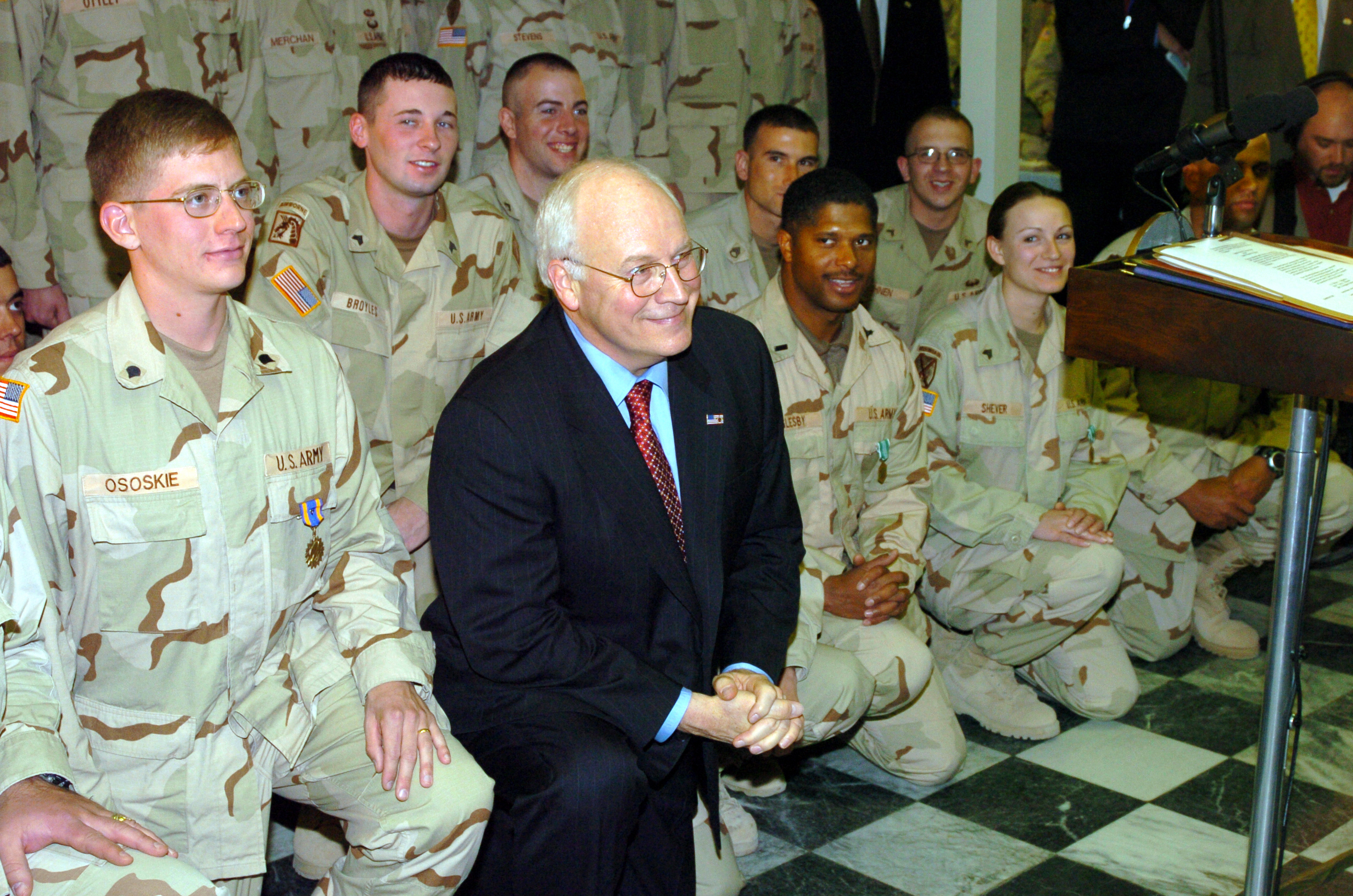
- Dick Cheney in Bagram, Afghanistan in 2004, roughly three years prior to the attack.
- Location: Bagram, Afghanistan
- Date: February 27, 2007; 10:00 a.m. (UTC+4:30)
- Target: Bagram Air Base; Vice President Dick Cheney
- Attack type: suicide attack, assassination attempt
- Deaths: 23
- Injuries: 20
- Perpetrators: Taliban al-Qaeda

The attempted assassination of Dick Cheney was a 2007 suicide attack that killed up to 23 people and injured 20 more at the Bagram Airfield in Afghanistan, while Dick Cheney, then Vice President of the United States, was visiting. The attack occurred inside one of the security gates surrounding the heavily guarded base 60 km north of Kabul. In 2007, Bagram was the main US airbase in Afghanistan.

== Events ==
On February 27, at about 10 am local time, a suicide bomber attacked the outer gate of the base, killing 23 people and injuring at least 20 others. Among the dead were U.S. soldier PFC Daniel Zizumbo, a U.S. contractor; SSG Yoon Jang-ho, a South Korean soldier; and 20 Afghan workers at the base.

Vice President Cheney was on the base at the time of the attack, having arrived in Afghanistan the previous day to meet with US Allies. US officials reported that the Vice President was never in danger and was about 1 mile away from the site of the explosion. A purported Taliban spokesman, Qari Yousef Ahmadi, told the Associated Press that the Taliban had advance knowledge of Cheney's visit and Cheney was the intended target—claims that were met with skepticism by US officials. One US spokesman called them "far-fetched" and observed that "the vice president wasn't even supposed to be here overnight, so this would have been a surprise to everybody." Another US spokesman, Lt. Col. David Accetta, reported that the attacker did not attempt to pass any of the U.S. security checkpoints, but instead detonated himself amongst a group of Afghans. Accetta was quoted as saying "To characterize this as a direct attempt on the life of the vice president is absurd."

Later reports released as part of the SIGAR reports revealed that word of Cheney's presence had leaked, and that the bomber had targeted a convoy as it left the base in the belief that Cheney was inside. Cheney had originally intended to depart in a different convoy which was scheduled to depart 30 minutes later. Media sources remarked that this picture of the bombing undermined the skeptical statements of US officials and supported the Taliban claim that the bombing had been a serious attempt on Cheney's life.

== See also ==
- 2014 Bagram Airfield bombing
- 2015 Bagram Airfield bombing
- 2016 Bagram Airfield bombing
