= Czech Afghanistan Contingent =

- Active: 2004, 2006, 2008-2009, 2011-2012
- Country: Czech Republic
- Allegiance: International Security Assistance Force
- Branch: Czech Armed Forces
- Type: battlegroup
- Size: 120
- Part of: Regional Command South(?)
- Garrison/HQ: Camp PROSTĚJOV, Kandahar province
- Engagements: War in Afghanistan: Operation Mountain Thrust

Czech BVP-2 Infantry Combat Vehicles on Forward Operating Base Altimur, Logar province, Afghanistan.

The Czech Afghanistan Contingent or Kontingent speciálních sil (KSS) was a joint military force of the Czech Armed Forces deployed mainly in the southern region of Afghanistan in Kandahar province, Nangarhar province and Helmand province. Czech combat forces were in Afghanistan several times - in 2004, 2006, 2008-2009 and in 2011-2012. The Czech fighting unit serving in Afghanistan was the 601st Special Forces Group (601. skupina speciálních sil). In addition to Czech combat units in Afghanistan to work as field hospitals, engineer units and police and military instructors to help train the Afghan police and army.

== Deployment Units ==
- 601. skupina speciálních sil (601st Special Forces Group) - special forces
- 6. polní nemocnice - field hospital
- 7. polní nemocnice - field hospital
- 11. polní nemocnice - field hospital
- 3. vrtulníková jednotka - helicopter unit
- 5. vrtulníková jednotka - helicopter unit
- 6. vrtulníková jednotka - helicopter unit
- 7. vrtulníková jednotka - helicopter unit

== Size ==
Combat forces:

Turn	Time frame	Commander	Unit	Number of Soldiers
Enduring Freedom (I)	24 March 2004 - August 2004	plukovník gšt. Ing. Ondrej Páleník	601. skupina speciálních sil	120
Enduring Freedom (II)	2006	plukovník gšt. Ing. Ondrej Páleník	601. skupina speciálních sil	120
Enduring Freedom (III-V)	2008 - 2009	?	601. skupina speciálních sil	3x100
Enduring Freedom (VI)	June 2011 - December 2011	plukovník Ing. Karel Řehka	601. skupina speciálních sil	100
Enduring Freedom (VII)	December 2011 - June 2012	plukovník Ing. Pavel Kolář	601. skupina speciálních sil	100

Non-combat forces:

Turn	Time frame	Commander	Unit	Number of Soldiers
Field Hospitals (ISAF - Fingal)	24 April 2002 - 28 January 2003	plukovník MUDr. Jindřich Sitta, podplukovník MUDr. Marek Obrtel	6. polní nemocnice, 11. polní nemocnice, Polní chirurgický tým	280
Kabul International Airport - Air traffic & Meteo (ISAF-KAIA)	March 2004 - March 2007	plukovník Bohuslav Dvořák	-	66 (350 in all turns)
Hospital & chemical unit - Kabul International Airport (KAIA)	April 2007 - December 2008	podplukovník MUDr. Martin Benda, major Ing. Karel Navrátil	7. polní nemocnice, 311. prapor radiační, chemické a biologické ochrany v Liberci	100 (658 in all turns)
Guarding of Camp Hadrian	16 January 2009 - 20 March 2009	kapitán Jiří Líbal	41. mechanizovaný prapor z Žatce, 42. mechanizovaný prapor z Tábora	63
Heli Unit ISAF (Transport)	2009 - 2011	plukovník gšt. Ing. Jaromír Šebesta, plukovník Ing. Václav Valeš	3. vrtulníková jednotka, 5. vrtulníková jednotka, 6. vrtulníková jednotka, 7. vrtulníková jednotka	7x100, 3 Mi-171Š
ISAF PRT (Provincial Reconstruction Team)	19 March 2008 - 31 January 2013		different engineer units (11 turns)	peak 300, (3000 in all turns)
Military Police Advisory Team	2011 - 2013		military police instructors	4x12
OMLT - Operational Mentoring and Liaison Team	2010 - 2013		military instructors	5x54
1. MAT Wardak ISAF (Military Advisory Team)	April 2013 - October 2013	podplukovník Ing. Jan Zezula, Ph.D.	71. mechanizovaný prapor	59
1. MAT Lógar ISAF (Military Advisory Team)	20 March 2013 - October 2013	major Ing. Přemysl Tuček	44. lehký motorizovaný prapor	64
