= Bagram Airfield =

Military base in Afghanistan

Bagram Airfield: د بګرام هوايي ډګر (Pashto); میدان‌هوایی بگرام (Dari)
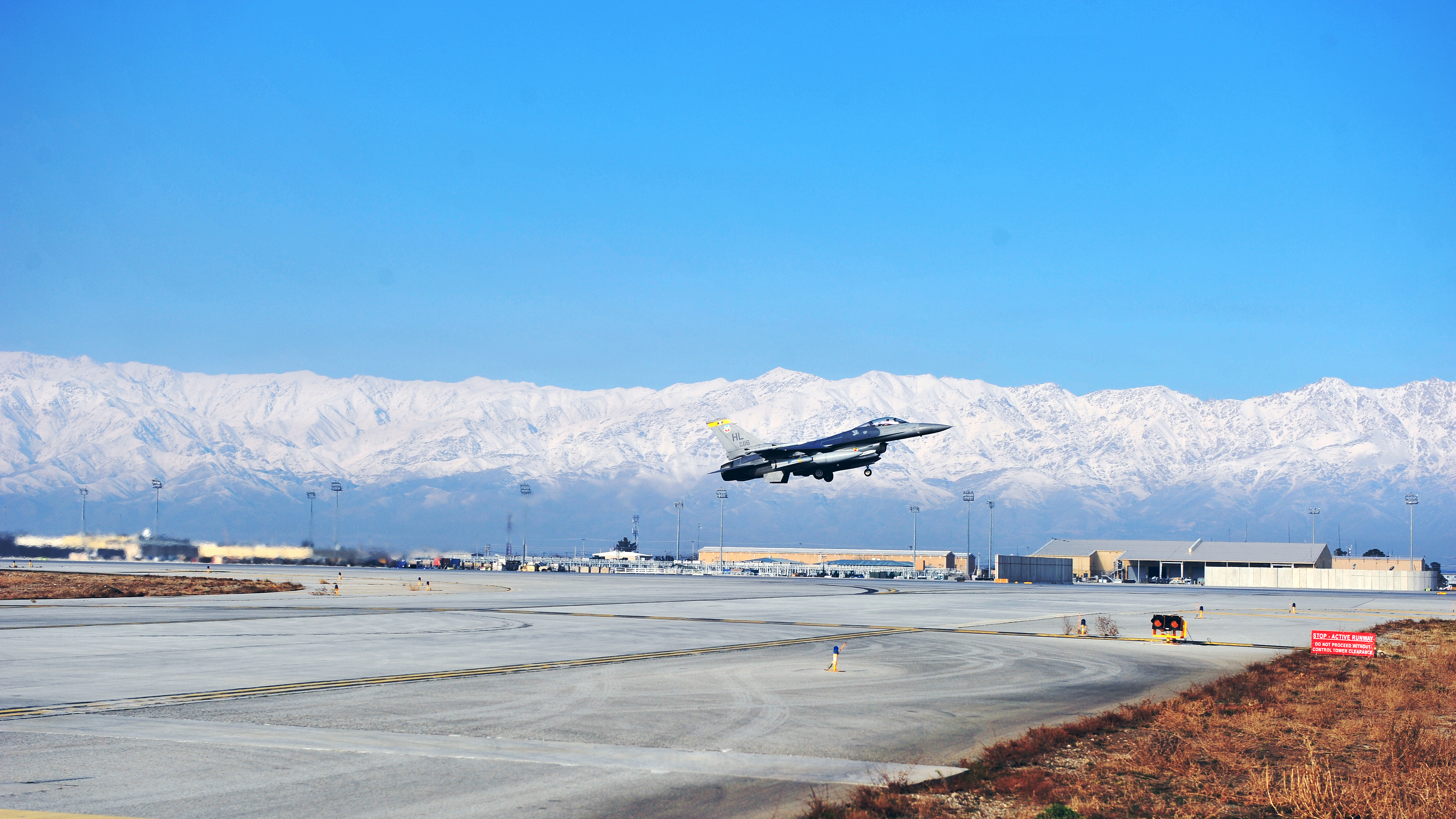
- A USAF F-16 Fighting Falcon taking off at Bagram Airfield in January 2015
- IATA: OAI; ICAO: OAIX

Summary
- Airport type: Military
- Owner: Ministry of Defense
- Operator: Afghan Armed Forces
- Location: Bagram, Afghanistan
- Elevation AMSL: 4,895 ft (1,492 m)
- Coordinates: 34°56′46″N 069°15′54″E

Map
- Location of airport in Afghanistan

Runways
Direction	Length		Surface
Direction	m	ft	Surface
03R/21L	3,724	12,218	Concrete
03L/21R	2,953	9,688	Concrete
- Source: skyvector.com; Google Earth

Bagram Airfield (BAF), also known as Bagram Air Base (IATA: OAI, ICAO: OAIX), is located 11 kilometres (6.8 mi) southeast of Charikar in the Parwan Province of Afghanistan. It was owned and operated by the country's Ministry of Defense. Sitting on the site of the ancient town of Bagram at an elevation of 1,492 metres (4,895 ft) above sea level, the air field has two concrete runways. The main one measures 3,602 by 46 metres (11,819 ft × 151 ft), capable of handling large military aircraft, including the Lockheed Martin C-5 Galaxy. The second runway measures 2,953 by 26 metres (9,687 ft × 85 ft). The air field also has at least three large hangars, a control tower, numerous support buildings, and various housing areas. There are also more than 13 hectares (32 acres) of ramp space and five aircraft dispersal areas, with over 110 revetments.

Bagram Airfield was built by the Soviet Union in the 1950s. Bagram Air Field was formerly the largest U.S. military base in Afghanistan, staffed by the United States Army Garrison (USAG) under the command of United States Forces - Afghanistan (USFOR-A) with major tenants such as the 455th Air Expeditionary Wing of the U.S. Air Force, along with rotating units of other U.S. and coalition forces. It was expanded and modernized by the Americans. There is also a U.S. Army hospital with 50 beds, three operating theatres and a modern dental clinic. Kabul International Airport is located approximately 40 km (25 mi) south of Bagram, connected by two separate roads.

On 15 August 2021, the entire Forward Operating Base (FOB) fell to Taliban rebel forces after the NATO-trained Afghan National Army had surrendered. All prisoners at the Detention Facility in Parwan (DFIP) were released. The International Committee of the Red Cross (ICRC) revealed that in August 2009 it has been informed about a second prison where detainees were held in isolation and without access to the ICRC (that is usually guaranteed to all prisoners); this was denied by U.S. authorities.

The base was targeted and damaged by Pakistani airstrikes in March 2026 during the 2026 Afghanistan–Pakistan war.

== History ==
=== Soviet period ===
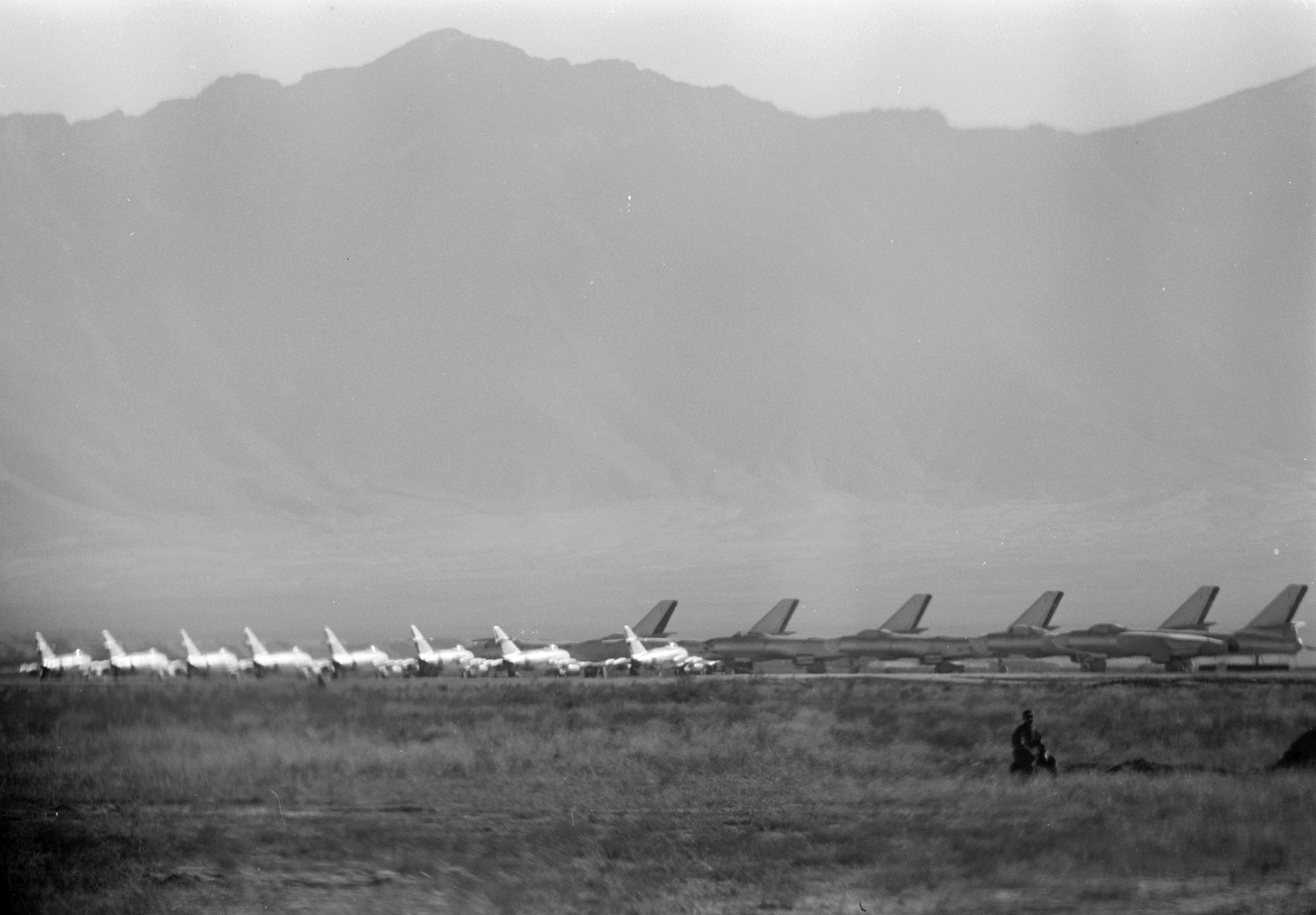
This image shows aircraft of the Afghan Air Force during U.S. President Eisenhower's visit in 1959.

Bagram Airfield was built by the Soviet Union in the 1950s. It was during the early period of the Cold War when the United States and the neighboring Soviet Union were spreading political influence in Afghanistan. While the United States was focusing on Afghanistan, the Soviets were strengthening ties with Cuba. In 1959, a year after Afghan Prime Minister Daud Khan toured the United States, U.S. President Dwight Eisenhower landed at Bagram Airfield where he was greeted by King Zahir Shah and Daud Khan among other Afghan officials.

In 1976, the original runway 3,000-metre long (10,000 ft), was built. The airport at Bagram was maintained by the Afghan Air Force (AAF) with some support from the United States. During the 1980s Soviet–Afghan War, it played a key role, serving as a hub for the Limited Contingent of Soviet Forces in Afghanistan operations and a base for its troops and supplies. Bagram was also the initial staging point for the invading Soviet forces at the beginning of the conflict, with elements of two Soviet Airborne Troops' divisions being deployed there. Aircraft based at Bagram, including the 368th Assault Aviation Regiment flying Su-25s, provided close air support for Soviet and Afghan troops in the field. The 368th Assault Aviation Regiment was stationed at Bagram from October 1986 to November 1987.

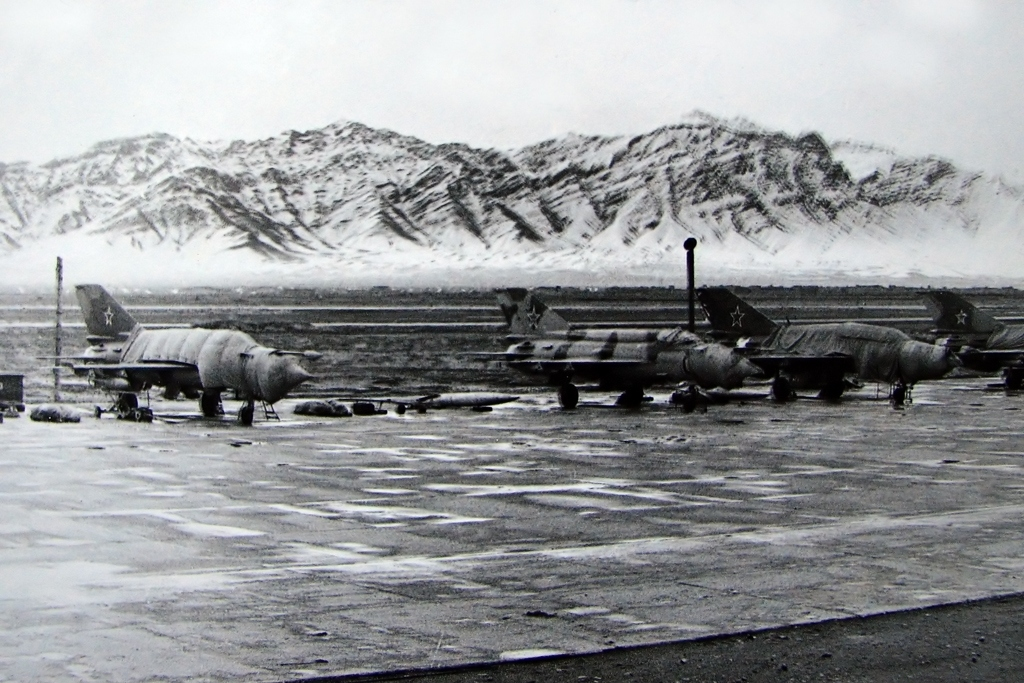
Soviet MiG-21 fighter jets at Bagram, 1980

Some of the Soviet land forces based at Bagram included the 108th Motor Rifle Division and the 345th Independent Guards Airborne Regiment of the 105th Guards Vienna Airborne Division. Following the withdrawal of the Soviet forces and the rise of the Western-funded and Pakistani-trained mujahideen rebels, Afghanistan plunged into civil war. Many of its support buildings and base housing built by the Soviet Armed Forces during their occupation were destroyed by years of fighting between various warring Afghan factions after the Soviets left.

From 1999 onward, control of the base was contested between the Northern Alliance and Taliban, often with each controlling territory on opposite ends of the airfield. Taliban forces were consistently within artillery and mortar range of the field, denying full possession of the strategic facility to the Northern Alliance. Press reports indicated that at times a Northern Alliance general was using the bombed-out control tower as an observation post and as a location to brief journalists, with his headquarters nearby.

Reports also indicated that Northern Alliance rocket attacks on Kabul had been staged from Bagram, possibly with Russian-made FROG-7 Rockets. In 2000, the Taliban took over control and forced the Northern Alliance to retreat further to the north.

=== 21st century ===
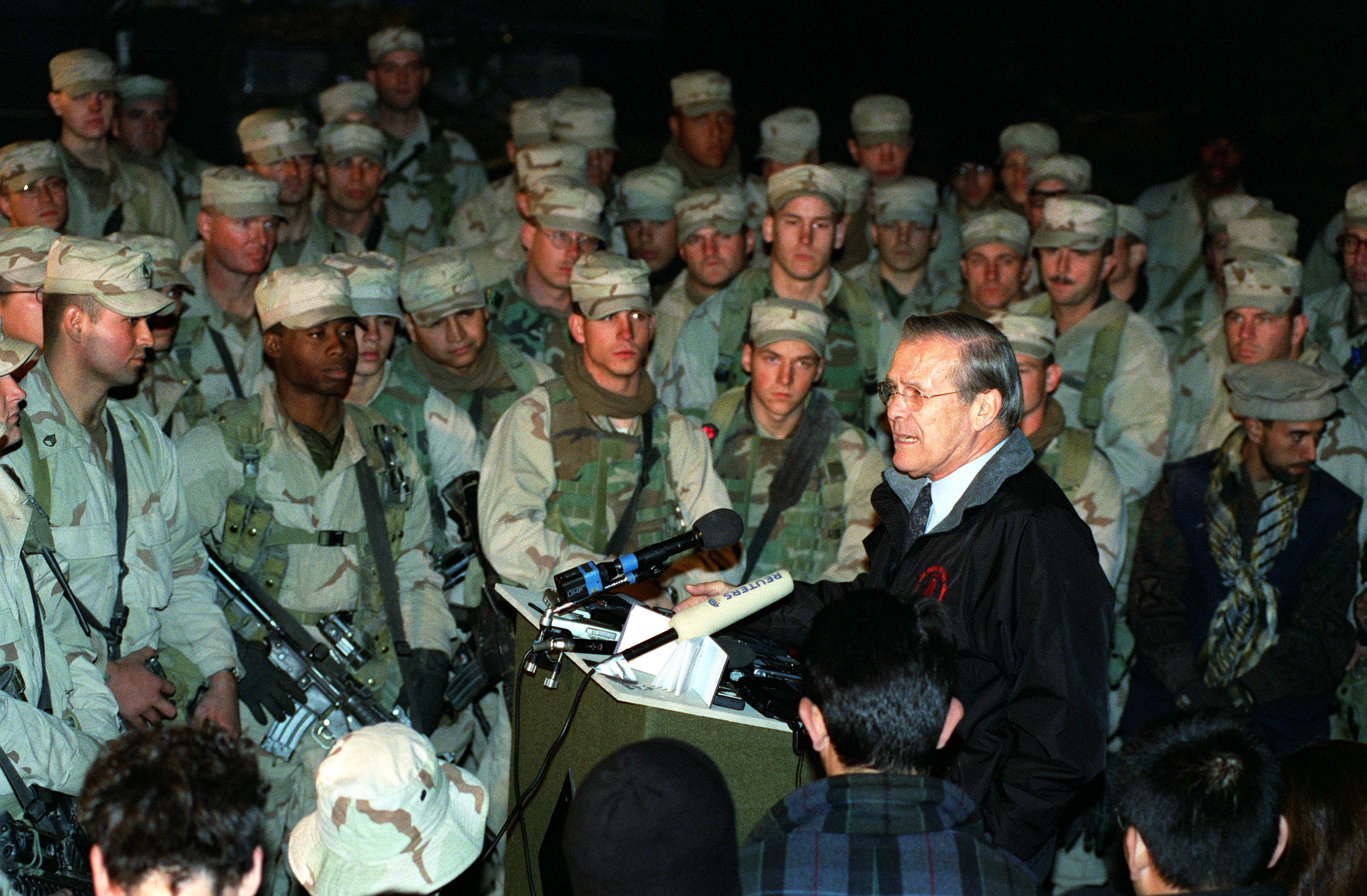
U.S. Secretary of Defense Donald Rumsfeld speaks to U.S. troops at Bagram on 16 December 2001.

During the U.S.-led invasion of Afghanistan, the base was secured by a team from the United Kingdom's Special Boat Service. By early December 2001, U.S. troops from the 10th Mountain Division shared the base with Special Operations Command officers from MacDill Air Force Base in Florida, Paratroopers of the 82nd Airborne Division from Fort Bragg, and a small communications team consisting of personnel from the 269th Signal Company, 11th Signal Brigade from Fort Huachuca. The British force consisted of B and C Companies from 40 Commando, Royal Marines. As of mid-December 2001 more than 300 U.S. troops, mainly with the 10th Mountain Division, were providing force protection at Bagram. The troops patrolled the base perimeter, guarded the front gate, and cleared the runway of explosive ordnance. As of early January 2002, the number of 10th Mountain Division troops had grown to about 400 soldiers.

There were numerous dining facilities at Bagram Airfield. Troops and civilians had various dining options that included Pizza Hut, Subway, an Afghan restaurant, as well as Green Beans coffee shops.

In late January 2002, there were somewhere around 4,000 U.S. troops in Afghanistan, of which about 3,000 were at Kandahar International Airport, and about 500 were stationed at Bagram. The runway began to be repaired by U.S., Italian, and Polish military personnel. By mid-June 2002, Bagram Airfield was serving as home to more than 7,000 U.S. and other armed services. Numerous tent areas housed the troops based there, including one named Viper City. It was reported that "Bagram came under daily rocket attack" in 2002 even though most of these attacks went unreported by the press. Landmines were also a serious concern in and around Bagram Airfield.

According to Reuters, in the early years of the conflict, the CIA used it as a black site for terrorism suspects.

By late 2003, B-huts, 5.5-by-11.0-metre (18 by 36 ft) structures made of plywood designed to hold eight troops, were replacing the standard shelter option for troops. There were several hundred, with plans to build close to 800 of them. The plans were to have nearly 1,200 structures built by 2006, but completion of the project was expected much earlier; possibly by July 2004. The increased construction fell under U.S. Central Command standards of temporary housing and allowed for the building of B-huts on base, not to show permanence, but to raise the standard for troops serving here. The wooden structures had no concrete foundation and thus were not considered permanent housing, just an upgrade from the tents, the only option Bagram personnel and troops had seen previously. The small homes offered troops protection from environmental conditions including wind, snow, sand and cold. During 2005, a USO facility was built and named after former pro football player and United States Army Ranger, Pat Tillman.

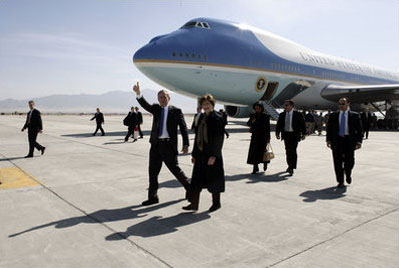
The 43rd U.S. President George W. Bush and wife Laura Bush arrive at Bagram Airfield in Air Force One on 1 March 2006.

A second runway, 3,500 metres (11,500 ft) long, was built and completed by the United States in late 2006, at a cost of US$68 million. This new runway is 497 metres (1,631 ft) longer than the previous one and 280 millimetres (11 in) thicker, giving it the ability to land larger aircraft, such as the C-5 Galaxy, C-17 Globemaster III, Il-76, An-124, An-225 or the Boeing 747 (which is used by civilian cargo airlines).

By 2007, Bagram had become the size of a small town, with traffic jams and many commercial shops selling goods from clothes to food. The base itself is situated high up in the mountains and sees temperatures drop to −29 °C (−20 °F). Due to the height and snowstorms commercial aircraft have difficulty landing there, and older aircraft often rely on very experienced crews in order to be able to land there. The base was able to house 10,000 troops in 2009.

The 2007 Bagram Airfield bombing was a suicide attack that killed up to 23 people and injured 20 more, at a time when Dick Cheney, then Vice-President of the United States, was visiting Afghanistan. The attack occurred inside one of the security gates surrounding the heavily guarded base. Yousef Ahmadi, one of the Taliban spokesmen, claimed responsibility for the attack and said that Cheney was the intended target. Another Taliban spokesman later confirmed that Osama bin Laden planned the attack, and reiterated that Cheney was the intended target. This claim is supported by the relatively limited number of large suicide bombings carried out in Afghanistan, combined with the intensity of this particular attack, and the fact that Cheney was at the base. Cheney was unharmed from the attack. Among the dead were a U.S. soldier, a U.S. contractor, a South Korean soldier, and 20 Afghan workers at the base.

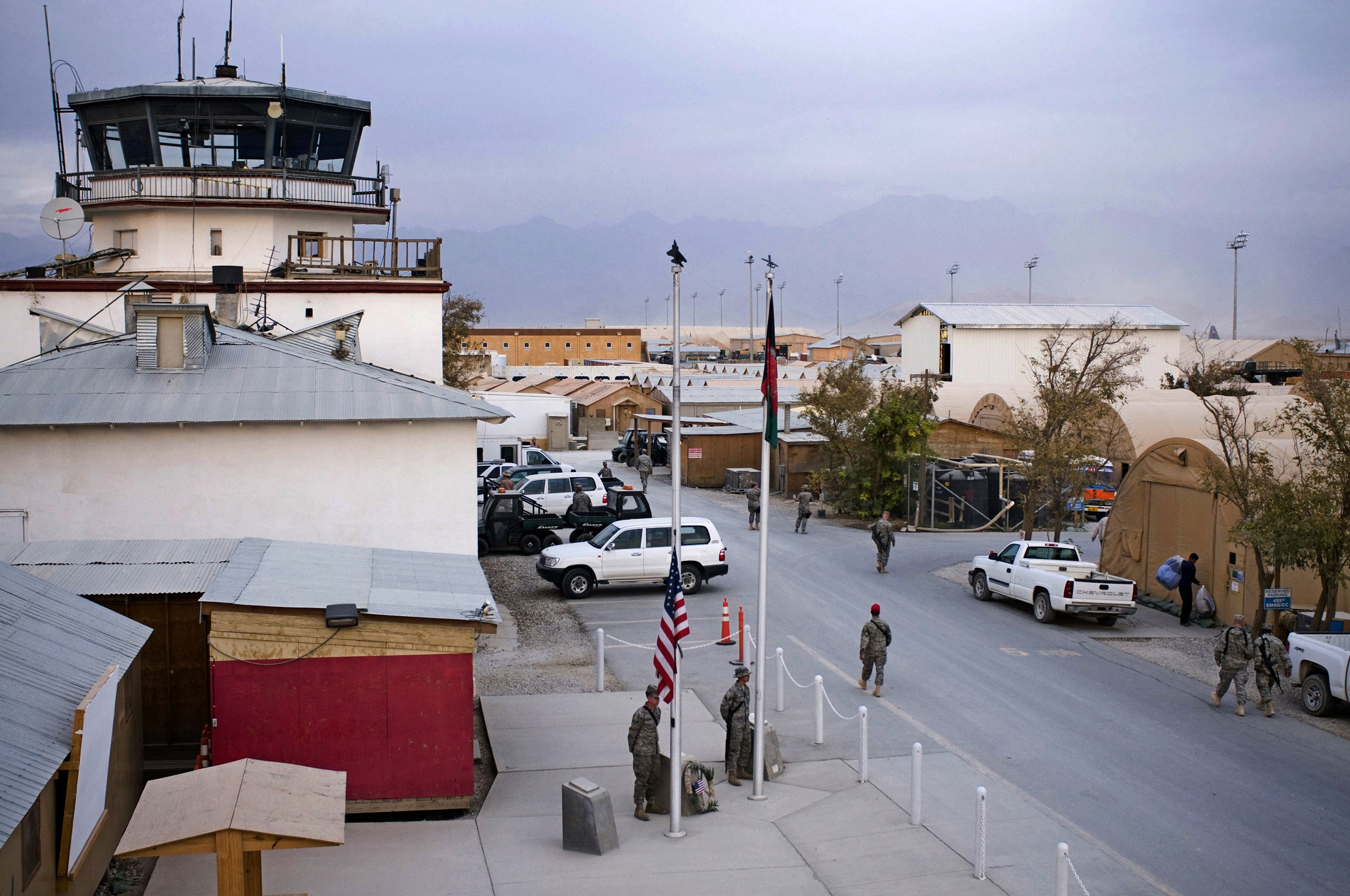
Veterans Day at the base in 2008

In 2008, several U.S. service members were accused of accepting bribes for the award of building contracts on Bagram. Four of the Afghans have also faced charges, while three of them have been held as material witnesses. The GI's are reported to have received over 100,000 dollars in bribes.

In March 2009, a car bomb exploded outside the gates of Bagram Airfield facilities, wounding three civilian workers. In June 2009, two U.S. soldiers were killed and at least six other personnel were wounded during an early morning rocket attack.

In October 2009, The State reported on Bagram's expansion. It reported that Bagram was currently undergoing US$200 million expansion projects, and called the Airfield a "boom town". According to the article: "Official U.S. policy is not to create a permanent occupation force in Afghanistan. But it is clear from what's happening at Bagram Airfield—the Afghan end of the Charleston-to-Afghanistan lifeline—that the U.S. military won't be packing up soon." In November 2009, construction of the Parwan Detention Facility was completed. It housed about 3,000 inmates, mostly insurgents who were fighting against Afghanistan and NATO-led forces.

In March 2010, the U.S. Air Force (USAF) installed 150 solar powered lights to address reports of sexual assaults at the base. Eight reported sexual assaults occurred at the base in 2009 involving Airmen; the U.S. Army's sexual assault response team reported treating 45 victims in 2009. The report revealed that most victims knew their attacker. In same month, insurgents attacked an area at the base with rockets. One of the rockets landed next to a B-Hut in a camp located on the west side of the base killing a Bosnian national, who was working at Bagram as a contract firefighter.

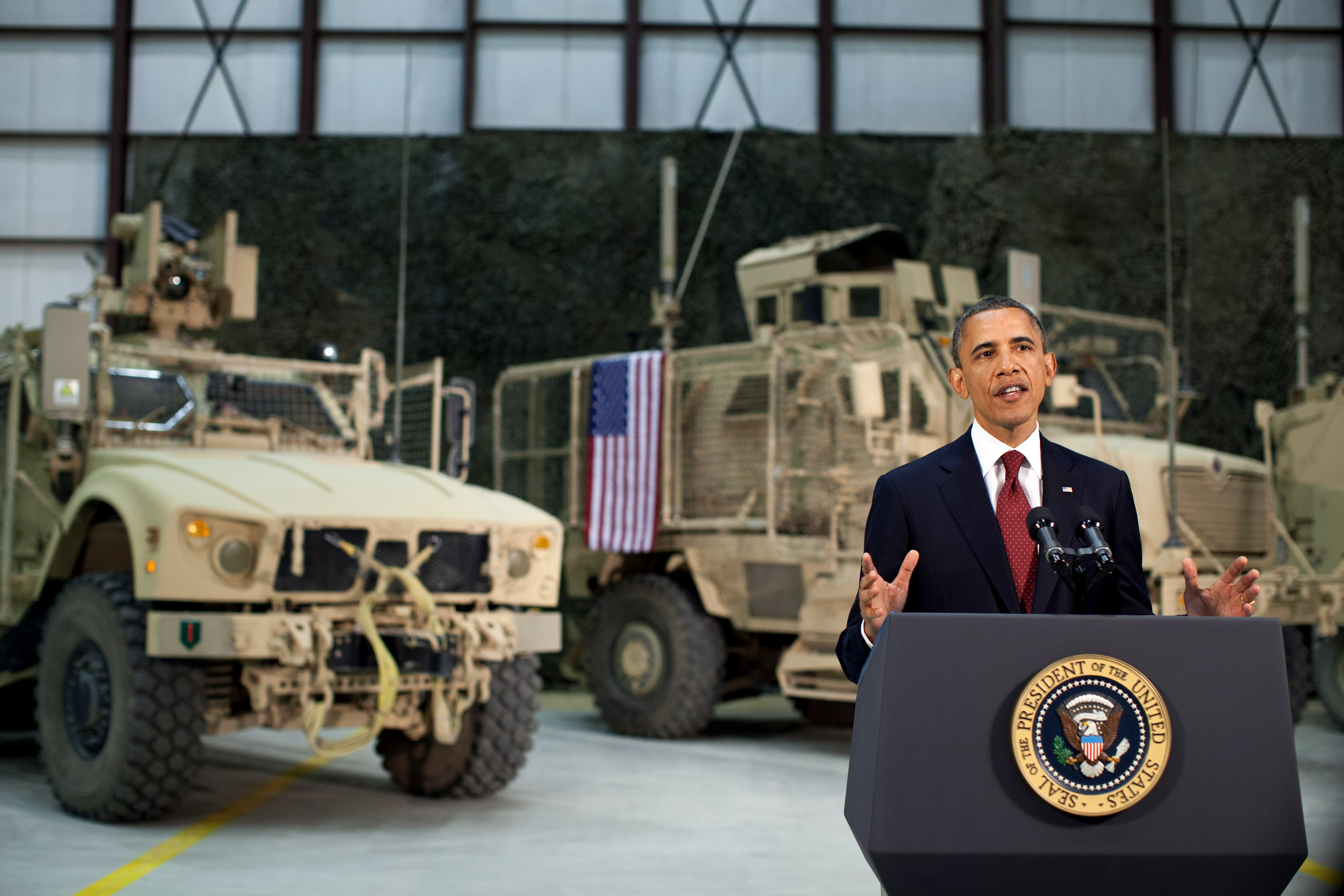
U.S. President Barack Obama at Bagram in 2012

In May 2010, a group of "nearly a dozen" insurgents attacked around the north end of the base. The assault left one U.S. contractor dead while nine service members were reported wounded. A spokesman for Bagram said a building was slightly damaged during the attack. Taliban spokesman claimed 20 armed men wearing suicide vests attacked the base with four detonating explosives at the entrances, but the military spokesman said they failed "to breach the perimeter" and were "unable to detonate their suicide vests." The attackers were dressed in U.S. Army uniforms.

Early on the morning of 30 December 2010, Taliban militants fired two rockets on Bagram though no casualties were reported. The insurgents claimed responsibility for the incident. After the 2012 Afghanistan Quran burning protests the United States decided to transfer the running of the Parwan Detention Facility to Afghan National Security Forces (ANSF), although the Americans continued to have access to the facility and veto power over the release of inmates.

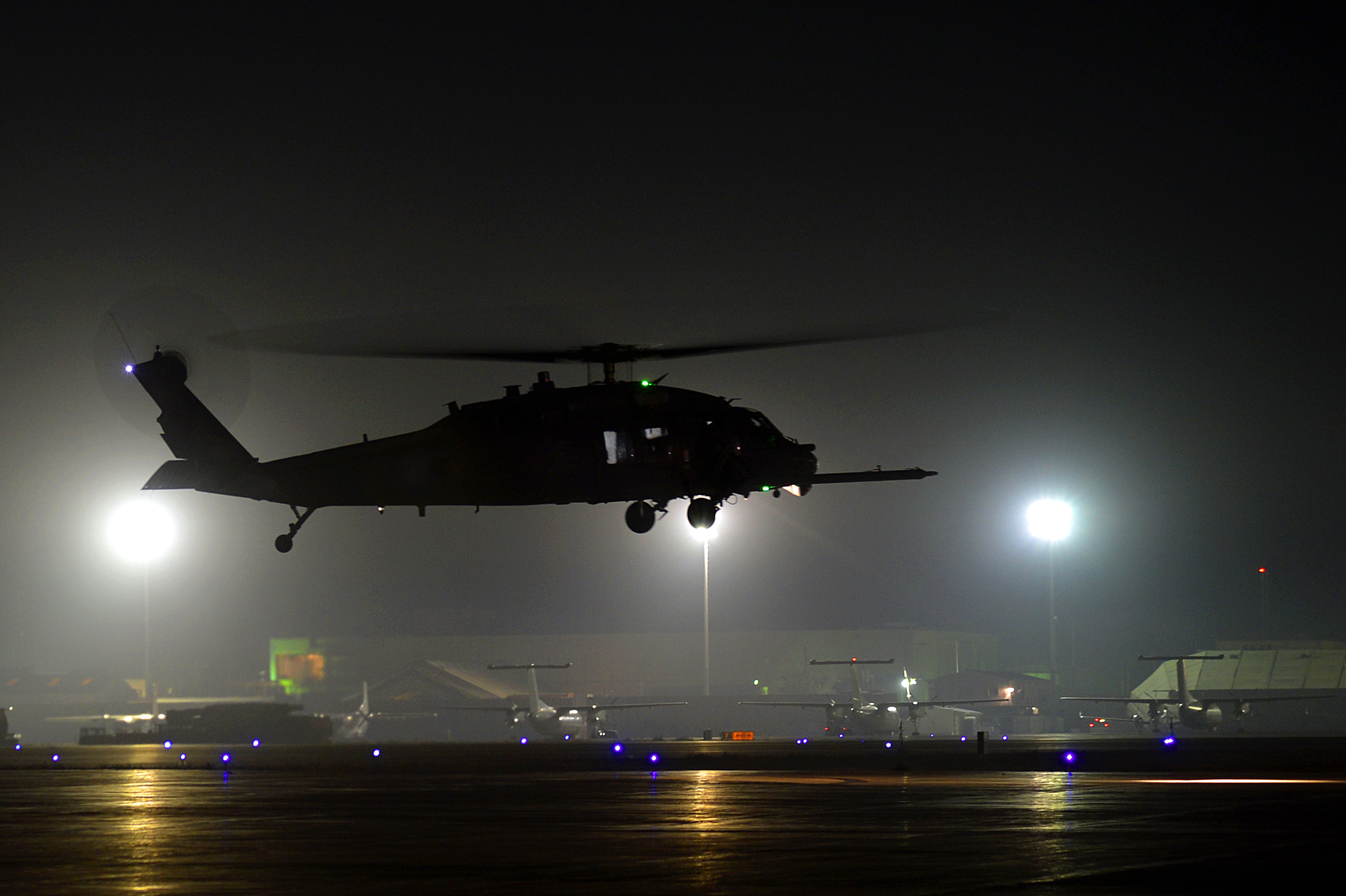
A night scene in November 2013

On 18 June 2013, the base was the subject of a mortar attack by Taliban forces, which resulted in four U.S. troops being killed and several others wounded. On Thanksgiving evening in 2013, a rocket attack killed 2 civilian contractors as they slept in their B hut on the southern part of the field.

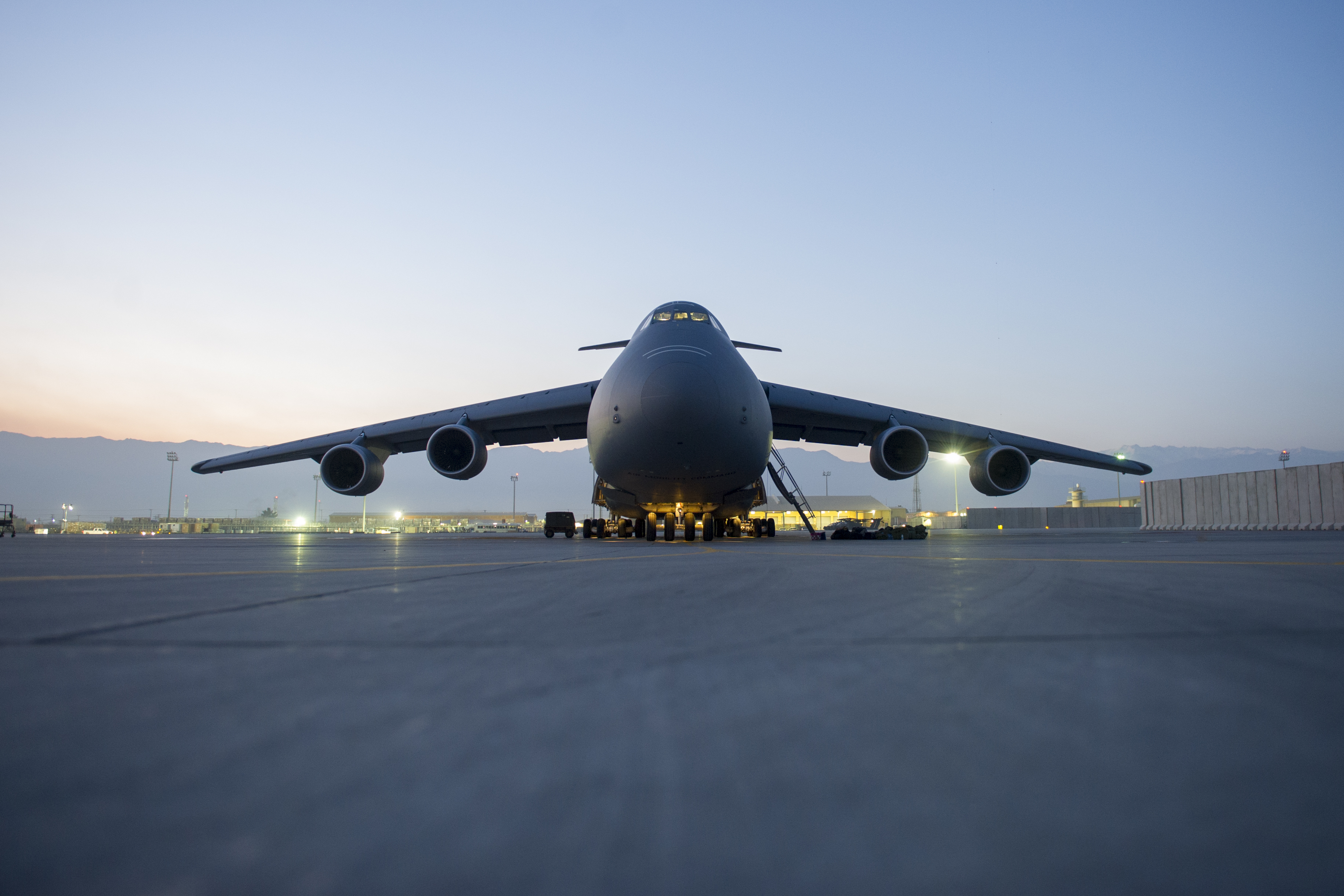
C-5 Galaxy

On 28 November 2019, U.S. President Donald Trump visited the Bagram Airfield for the first time to celebrate Thanksgiving with the U.S. troops there.

As part of the US withdrawal from Afghanistan, after nearly 20 years of continuous U.S. presence at the site, the Bagram Air Base was secretly evacuated by the U.S. during the night on 1 July 2021 and de facto handed back to the Afghan government on 2 July 2021. The last remaining U.S. troops left the base by shutting off the electricity and slipping away in the night without notifying the Afghan Armed Forces. The base was looted by local civilians soon after U.S. forces left the area. The Afghan National Army later took control of the area and arrested some looters.

On 15 August 2021, Afghan troops stationed there fell back from their positions, leaving them to the Taliban and losing control of the airfield. The Taliban freed thousands of prisoners, including senior Al-Qaeda and Taliban figures from the prison complex.

==== Post-American control ====
On 9 March 2024, National Resistance Front of Afghanistan (NRF) fighters claimed responsibility for an attack which killed the Bagram Division's chief of staff.

On 14 August 2024, the Taliban celebrated the three-year anniversary of their victory against the United States and Western powers at Bagram Airfield.

During a state visit to the United Kingdom in September 2025, U.S. President Donald Trump disclosed that the United States was "trying" to take back possession of the airfield. According to CNN, three people familiar with the matter stated that discussions about returning the base to U.S. control had been underway for at least 6 months. The Taliban rejected the idea out of hand. He cited China's proximity as a key reason for seeking to regain control of the base, stating that the facility is located "an hour away from where [China] makes its nuclear weapons." On Truth Social, Trump issued a threat that, "If Afghanistan doesn't give Bagram Airbase back to those that built it, the United States of America, BAD THINGS ARE GOING TO HAPPEN!!!". At the seventh Moscow Format Consultations on Afghanistan in October 2025, regional powers-including India, China, Russia, Iran, and Central Asian states issued a joint statement implicitly opposing Trump's demand to reclaim the strategic airbase. The statement "called unacceptable the attempts by countries to deploy their military infrastructure in Afghanistan and neighboring states, since this does not serve the interests of regional peace and stability." Taliban spokesperson Zabihullah Mujahid stated that "Afghans will never allow their land to be handed over to anyone under any circumstances," rejecting the possibility of foreign military presence in the country. Similarly, Zakir Jalaly, an official with the Afghan Foreign Ministry, dismissed the notion of the base being returned to the U.S.

==== 2026 Afghanistan-Pakistan war ====
On 1 March 2026, Pakistan's information minister, Attaullah Tarar, stated that 46 locations across Afghanistan had been targeted by air strikes since the start of the Operation Ghazab Lil Haq, including Bagram Airfield. Afghan officials claimed they had repelled the aerial attack on Bagram Airfield using ZU-23 anti-aircraft guns, and the airfield suffered no damage. However, satellite imagery published by New York Times showed that a hangar and two warehouses at the base had been destroyed. Pakistani officials also stated that the air strike on Bagram Airfield had destroyed military supplies and an unknown number of Black Hawks, C-130 and Super Tucanos.

== Camp Vance ==
Camp Vance
- Near New Dehsabz City site in Afghanistan

Site information
- Owner: Afghanistan
- Operator: Afghanistan
- Controlled by: Afghanistan
- Open to the public: Not open to public

Location
- Coordinates: 34°57′10″N 069°15′43″E

Site history
- Built: 2002
- In use: 2016

Camp Vance, Afghanistan was the base, 1.4 km from the airfield, established in December 2002 by the United States Department of Defense to headquarter the Combined Joint Special Operations Task Force (CJSOTF).

The camp was named for Gene Arden Vance Jr., a member of the U.S. Special Forces and a cryptologic linguist who, despite being critically wounded, helped save the lives of two fellow Americans and 18 Afghan soldiers during the hunt for Osama bin Laden in the War in Afghanistan.

Camp Vance was headquartered by U.S. Special Forces troops whose core tasks included advising the Afghan National Army's special operations forces and local police, training forces associated with the Village Stability Operations (VSO) and counterinsurgency (COIN). The camp also housed highly specialized battalion-level task forces built around Army Special Forces, infantry, a Marine special operations battalion, and a Navy SEAL team.

== Parwan Detention Facility ==
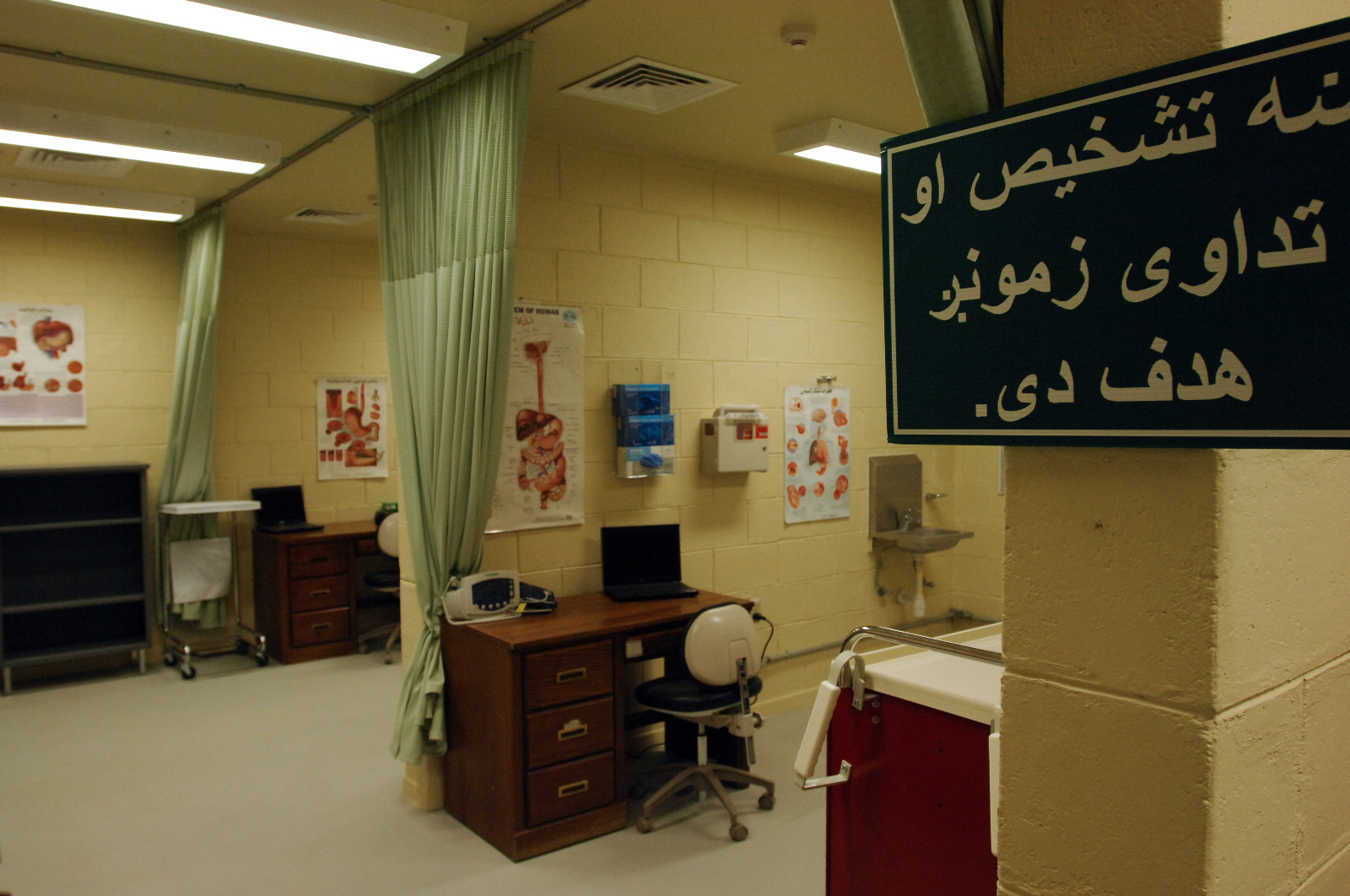
The nurse office inside the Parwan Detention Facility

The Parwan Detention Facility (PDF) was completed in 2009 and is located at Bagram Airfield. It was the main detention facility for persons detained by U.S. forces in Afghanistan. The older detention facility, which was located at a different site, has been criticized in the past for alleged torture and prisoner abuse. In 2005, The New York Times reported that two detainees had been beaten to death by guards in December 2002. Amnesty International used the word "torture" to describe treatment at the detention center.

Apart from military and intelligence personnel, the only people officially allowed inside the prison building were Red Cross representatives who inspected the facility once every two weeks. It was reported in February 2009 that detainees had no access to any legal process. Many of the officers and soldiers interviewed by U.S. Army investigators in the subsequent criminal investigation said the large majority of detainees were compliant and reasonably well treated. Some interrogators routinely administered harsh treatment which included alleged beatings, sleep deprivation, sexual humiliation, shackling to ceilings, and threats with guard dogs. Amnesty International has criticized the U.S. government for using dogs in this way at the detention center.

In 2005, the number of anti-American militants held at Bagram was 450, but began increasing then. In the same year, four al-Qaeda militants escaped from Bagram detention center. To address the mounting human rights violations and the 2005 escape incident, the U.S. decided to build a more modern detention facility. As of November 2011, more than 3,000 alleged militants and foreign terrorists were detained at PDF, roughly 18 times as many as in Guantanamo Bay. The number increased 5-fold since President Barack Obama took office in January 2009. The detainees included senior members of al-Qaeda and Taliban militant commanders. In 2012, the Afghan government requested that control of the Parwan Detention Facility be handed over to the Afghan National Security Forces (ANSF).

Alleged prisoner abuse at Bagram by U.S. personnel was the subject of the 2007 Academy Award-winning documentary Taxi to the Dark Side. The film details the severe beatings and torture, and ultimate death, of an Afghan taxi driver being held at the Parwan Detention Facility.

== Medical care ==
The Heathe N. Craig Joint Theater Hospital on the base is 50 bed military hospital named after SSG Heathe N. Craig, a United States Army medic who died while trying to save a wounded comrade.

== Incidents and accidents ==
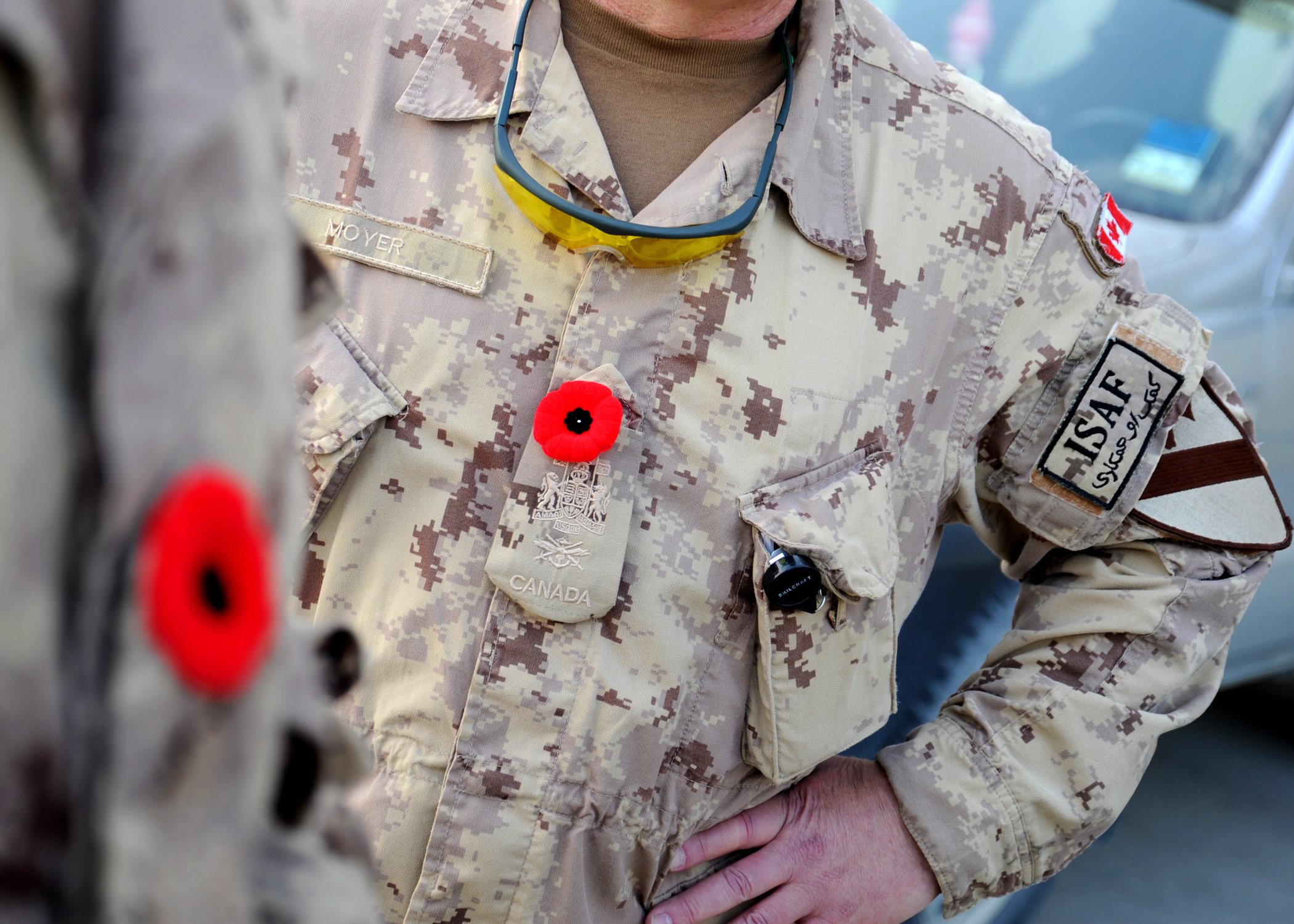
Canadian service members wearing red poppy flowers attend a ramp ceremony at Bagram Airfield, 31 October 2011, to honour Master Corporal Byron Greff, 3rd Battalion Princess Patricia's Canadian Light Infantry.

- 19 December 2002: A Block 20 MLU F-16 fighter overran a runway at Bagram Airfield and landed about 500 metres (1,600 ft) away in a mine field. The Danish Air Force pilot was evacuated to a U.S. Army hospital.
- 25 December 2002: A C-130 ran off the runway, closing the runway for a 24-hour period. There were no injuries.
- 20 April 2003: A C-17 landed on part of the runway that was closed due to construction: The C-17 suffered over $2 million in main landing gear damage. There were no injuries.
- 27 February 2007: A suicide bombing at the outer gate of the base left at least 23 people dead and injured 20 others.
- 10 August 2007: A U.S. CH-47 Chinook s/n 83-24123 while on the ground at Bagram Airfield, taxied into another parked CH-47D aircraft (84-24182) and was severely damaged. There were no fatalities. The aircraft was written off.
- 5 August 2008: A United Arab Emirates Air Force C-130 Hercules (S/N 1212) overran the runway and caught fire. There were no casualties. The plane was partially salvaged.
- 21 October 2008: A United States Navy P-3 Orion reconnaissance and intelligence aircraft overshot the runway while landing. The aircraft caught fire and was destroyed but the only injury to the crew was one broken ankle. The aircraft was from PATWING 5 from Naval Air Station Brunswick and was assigned to CTF-57 in Afghanistan
- 1 March 2010: An ACT Airlines Airbus A300 TC-ACB sustained substantial damage when the port main landing gear did not extend and lock out completely. The gear collapsed on landing, forcing the aircraft to veer off the runway. The aircraft was a write-off and was scrapped within four days of the crash.
- 10 June 2011: A French Army Gazelle Viviane crashed about 20 kilometres (12 mi) from Bagram in the north of the country in difficult weather conditions. One person died and the pilot was seriously injured.
- 29 April 2013: National Airlines Flight 102 was a Boeing 747 that crashed on takeoff killing all seven American crew members. The crash was recorded by the dashboard video camera of an approaching vehicle.
- 21 December 2015: A suicide bomber on a motorcycle killed 6 U.S. troops in an attack near the base.
- 12 November 2016: A suicide bomber managed to enter the Air Force base, killing at least 4 Americans and injuring 17 others. U.S. and Afghan forces pledged an investigation on the matter.
- 11 December 2019: An Afghan suicide bomber hit an under construction medical facility near the base. Two Afghan civilians were killed and 80 were wounded.
- 9 April 2020: Five rockets hit the base with no casualties reported. The Taliban denied responsibility and Daesh claimed responsibility.

== See also ==
- Camp Leatherneck
- Camp Marmal
- International Security Assistance Force
- Kandahar International Airport
- List of airports in Afghanistan
- Transit Center at Manas (Manas Air Base)
- War in Afghanistan order of battle, 2012
- 2019 Bagram Airfield attack
