= Bagram =

Town in Afghanistan

Bagram بگرام بګرام
- Town
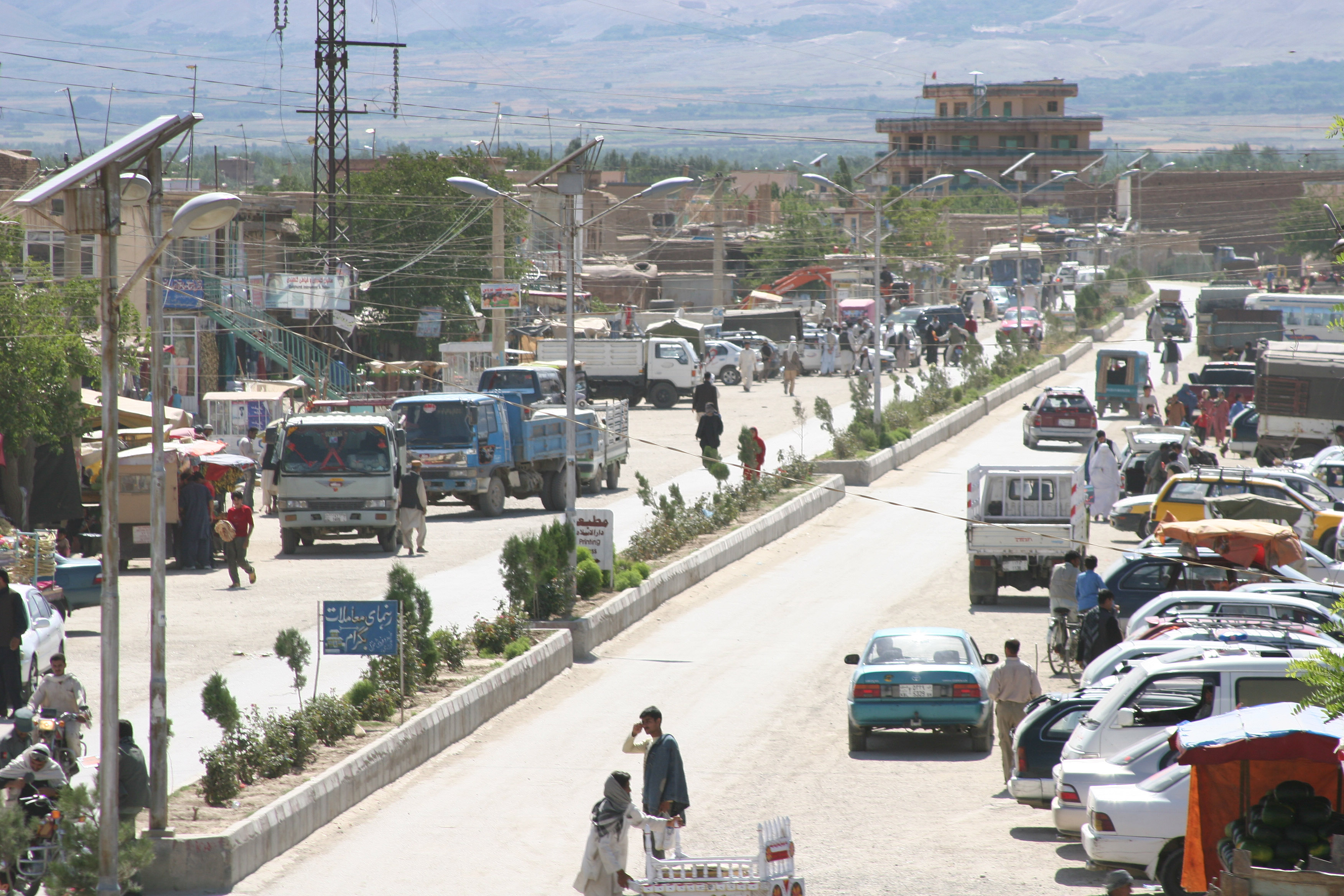
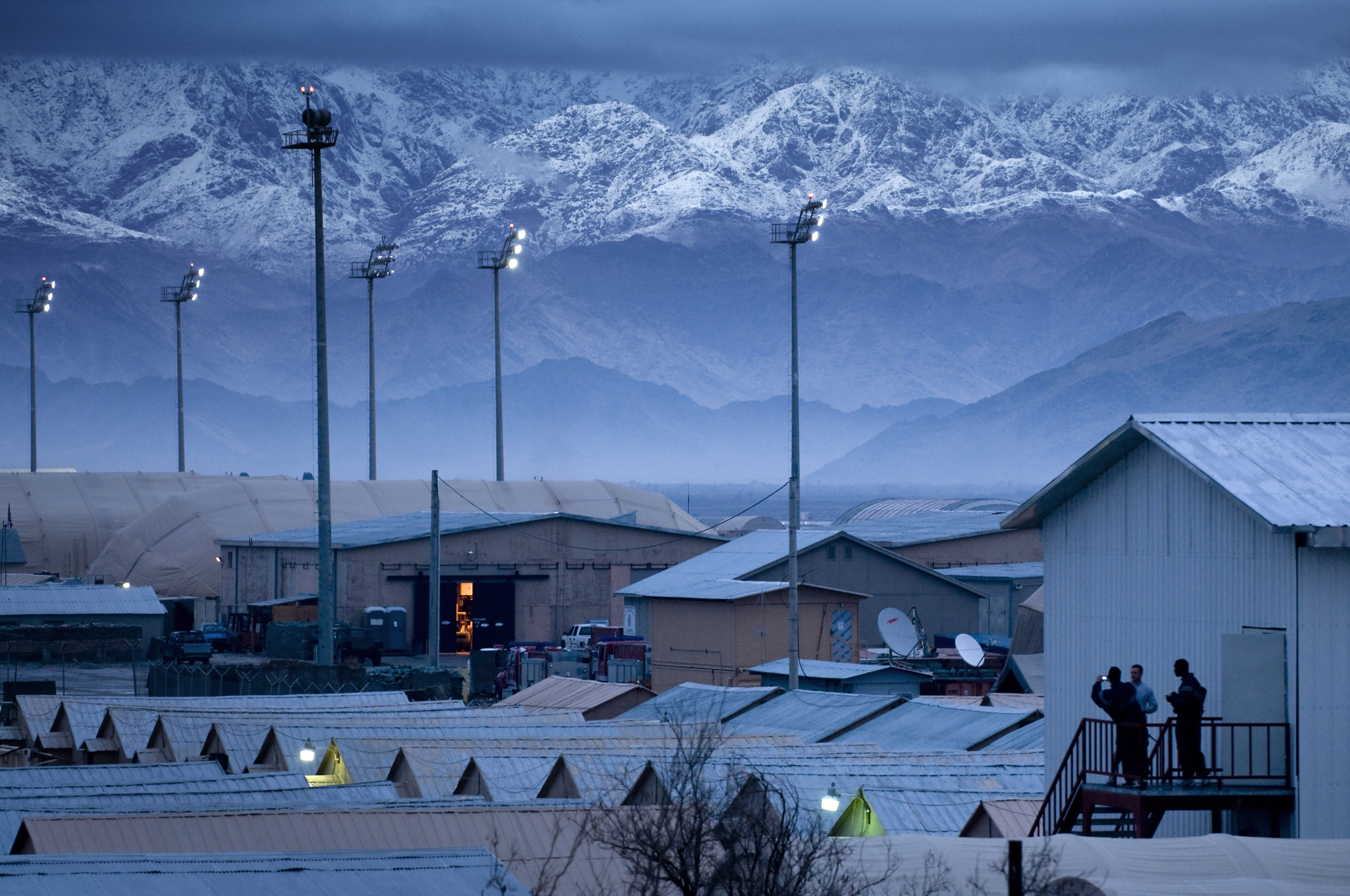
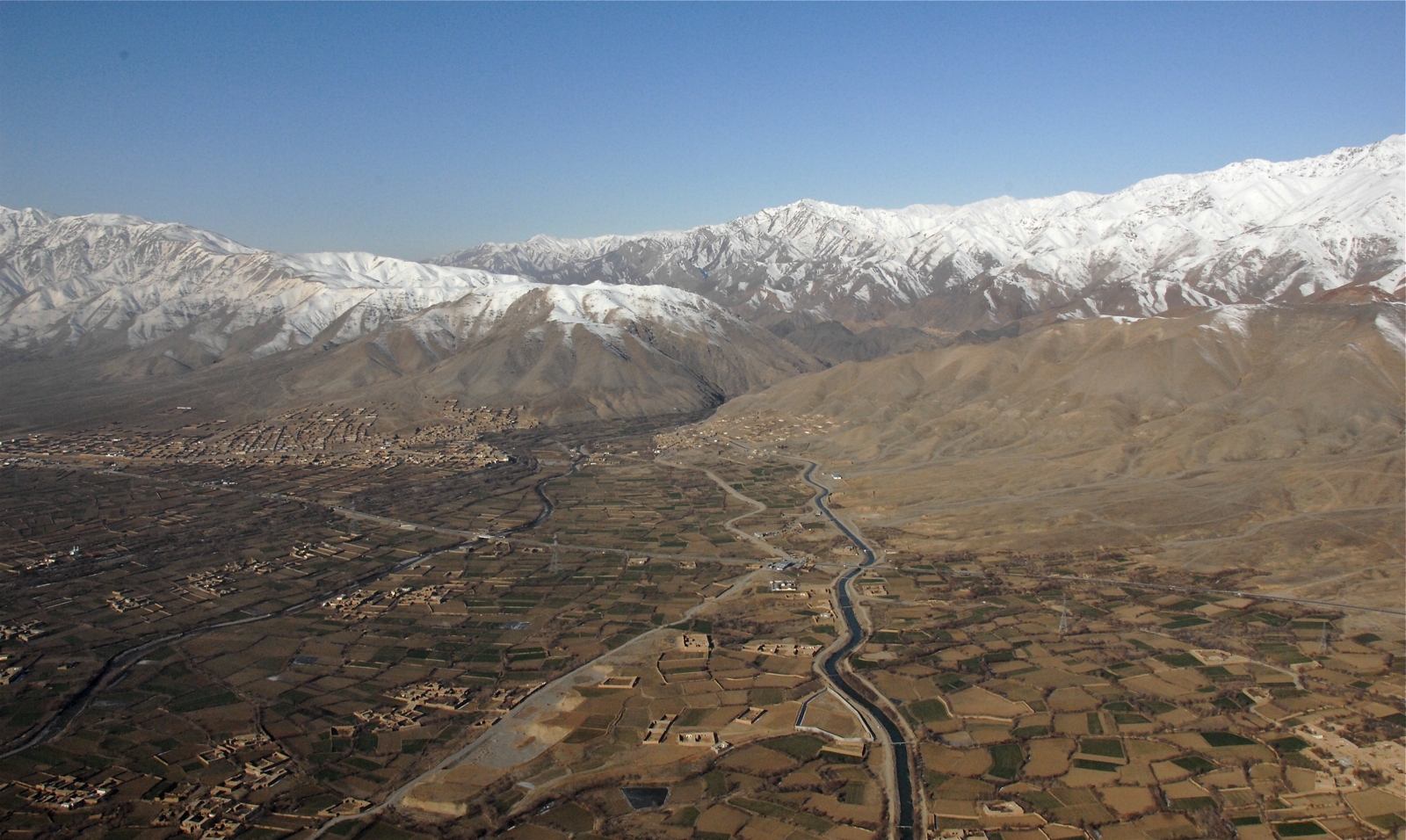
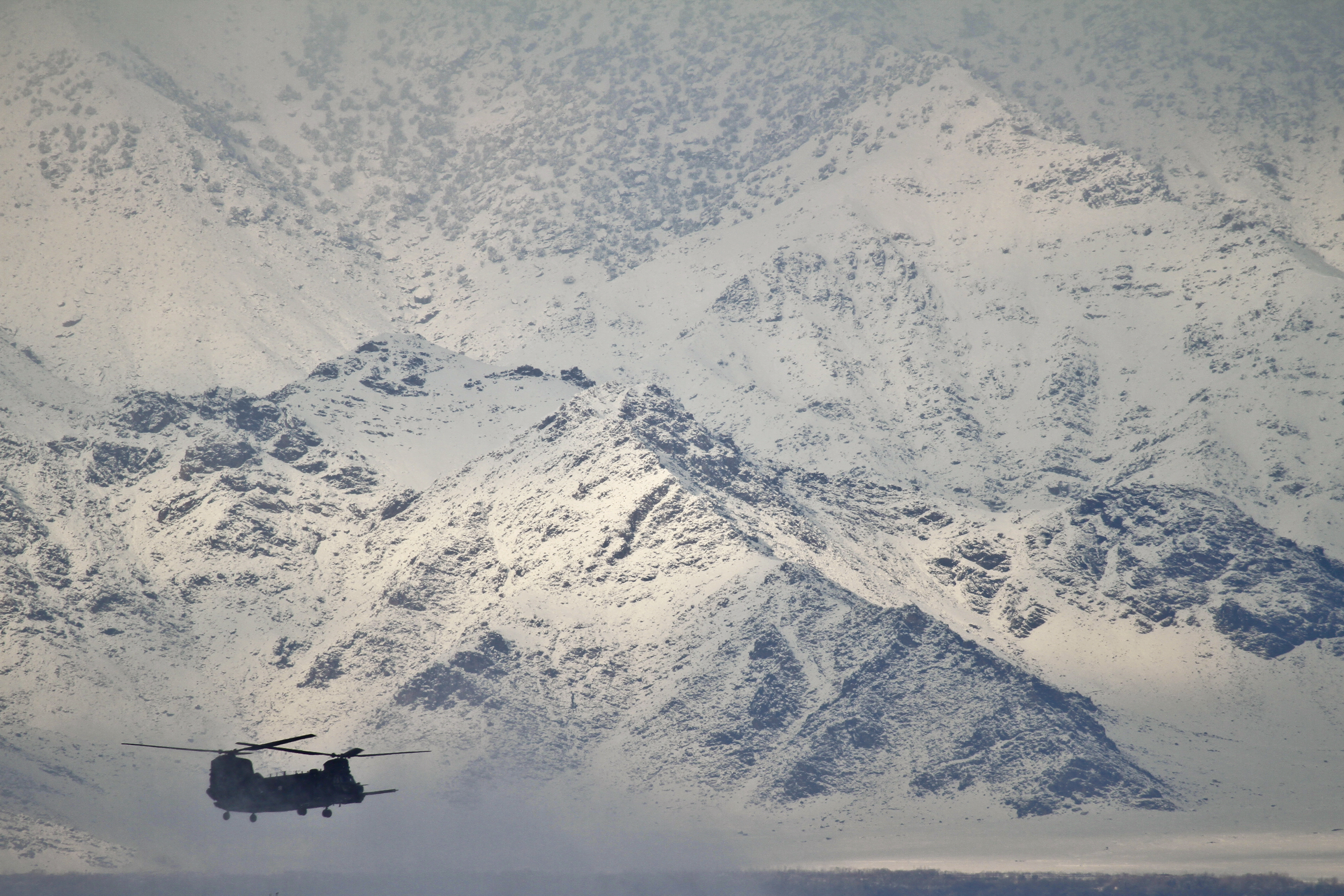
- Clockwise from top: Bazaar and part of Bagram (2009); Bagram Valley; A U.S. Army CH-47 Chinook heavy lift helicopter takes off on February 4, 2012 from Bagram Airfield; and Bagram Airfield in winter

- Location in Afghanistan Bagram (South Asia)
- Coordinates: 34.9403°N 69.2550°E
- Country: Afghanistan
- Province: Parwan
- District: Bagram
- Elevation: 4,882 ft (1,488 m)
- Time zone: +04:30

Bagram (/bəɡrɑːm/; Pashto/Dari: بگرام) is a town and seat in Bagram District in Parwan Province of Afghanistan, about 60 kilometers north of the capital Kabul. It is the site of an ancient city located at the junction of the Ghorband and Panjshir Valley, near today's city of Charikar, Afghanistan. The location of this historical town made it a key passage from Ancient India along the Silk Road, leading westwards through the mountains towards Bamiyan, and north over the Kushan Pass to the Baghlan Valley and past the Kushan archeological site at Surkh Kotal, to the commercial centre of Balkh and the rest of northern Afghanistan. Bagram was the capital of the Kushan Empire in the first century AD.

== History ==
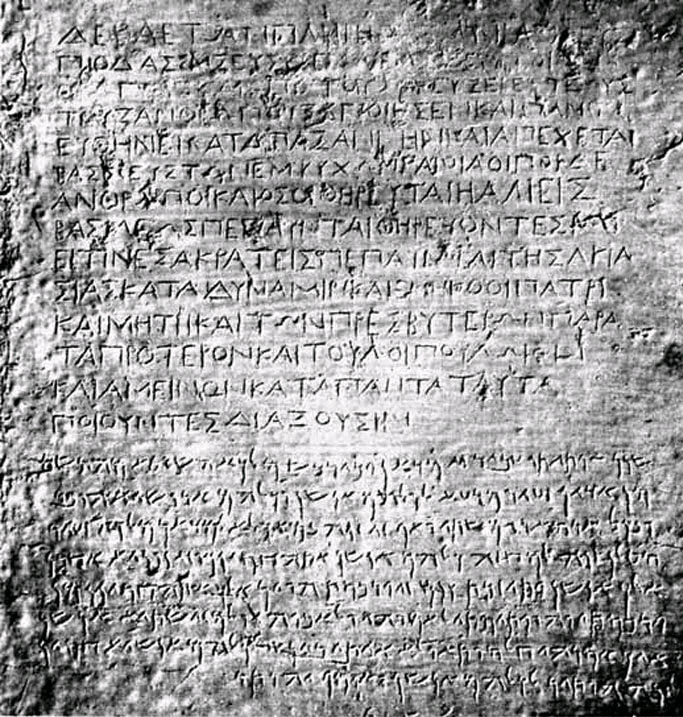
Bilingual edict (Greek and Aramaic) by Emperor Ashoka, from Kandahar - Afghan National Museum. (Click image for translation).

=== Ancient history ===
The ancient city of Kapisi is identified with present-day Bagram. The figures of ancient Buddhist and Hindu sculptures show that the city was initially ruled by Indic people who have either migrated or intermingled with the Iranian populations who moved into the region like Kambojas from Bactria.

While the Diadochi were warring amongst themselves, the Mauryan Empire was developing in the northern part of the Indian subcontinent. The founder of the empire, Chandragupta Maurya, confronted a Macedonian invasion force led by Seleucus I in 305 BC and following a brief conflict, an agreement was reached as Seleucus ceded Gandhara and Arachosia (centered on ancient Kandahar) and areas south of Bagram (corresponding to the extreme south-east of modern Afghanistan) to the Mauryans. During the 120 years of the Mauryans in southern Afghanistan, Buddhism was introduced and eventually become a major religion alongside Zoroastrianism and local pagan beliefs. Mauryan punch-marked coins have been discovered at Begram and Mir Zakah, indicating early trade or administrative presence in the region.

Bagram became the capital of the Kushan Empire in the first century. The "Bagram treasure" as it has been called, is indicative of intense commercial exchanges between all the cultural centers of the classical time, with the Kushan empire at the junction of the land and sea trade between the east and west. However, the works of art found in Bagram, such as the Begram ivories, are either quite purely Hellenistic, Roman, Chinese or Indian, with only little indications of the cultural syncretism found in Greco-Buddhist art.

=== Islamic conquest ===
The Islamic conquest of Afghanistan and the adjoining Pashtun region began in seventh century right after conquest of Persia. However, the complete Islamization of Afghanistan wasn't achieved until the Ghaznavid rule. The modern-day town is believed to be founded by Babur at the site of the ancient city. In Babur's memoirs, the Baburnama, the emphasis of his visit in 1519 is on the colony of Hindu ascetics at Gurh Kattri (Kur Katri), who fascinated him.

=== Recent history ===
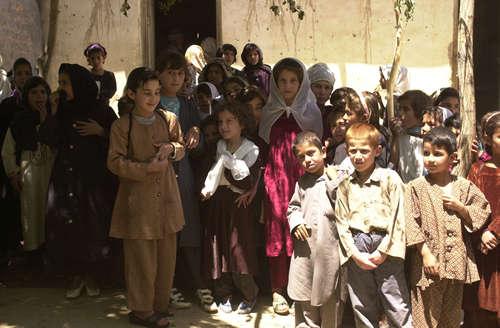
Bagram school children

Bagram hosts the strategic Bagram Airfield, from which most US air activity in Afghanistan took place. The runway was built in 1976, and it was a Soviet air base from 1979 to 1989. There was also a Provincial Reconstruction Team when the US were present in Afghanistan and implemented their counter-insurgency strategy.

Bagram is also the location of the Parwan Detention Facility; this detention facility was the last prison in Afghanistan under management of the US. It was handed back to the Afghan government on 25 March 2013. The detention centre had earlier come into the attention of the news media as it was claimed that prisoners were tortured (see the article Bagram torture and prisoner abuse). At the time of the hand-over of the facility, human-rights groups like Amnesty International have raised concerns about the treatment of prisoners there.

On 21 December 2015, Bagram was the site of a suicide bombing killing 6 people.

On 1 July 2021, US troops departed from the air base, abandoning the outpost over to the Afghan government after 20 years. According to the Afghan commander at the time, the US evacuated the base during the night without any previous official notice to the Afghan army.

== Climate ==
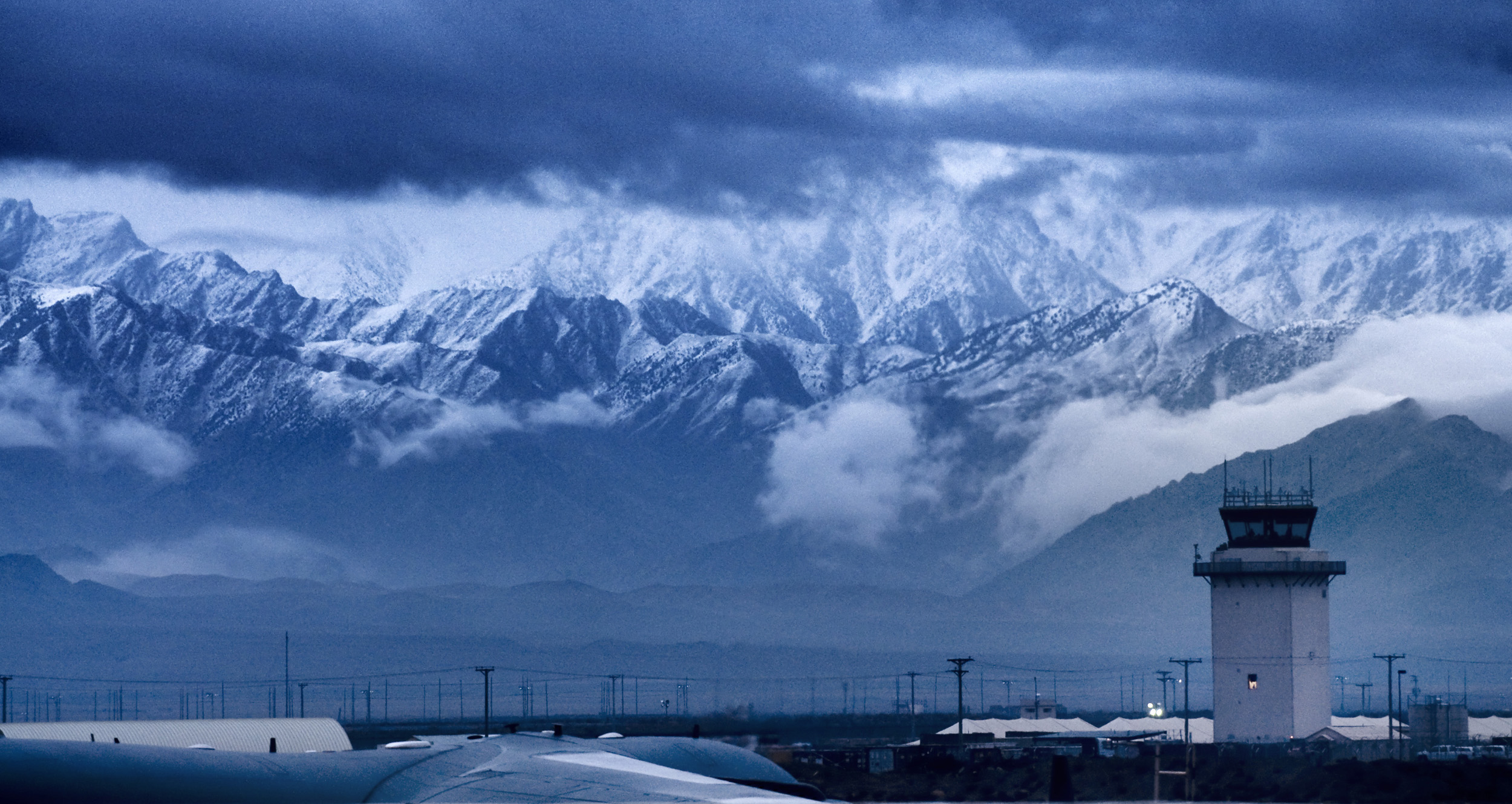
Storm clouds part, offering a rare glimpse through the crisp air at Bagram Airfield, Afghanistan, 18 December 2008. The high altitude of the Hindu Kush mountain range creates a harsh climate ranging from more than 100 degrees Fahrenheit in the summer to below-freezing temperatures in the winter.

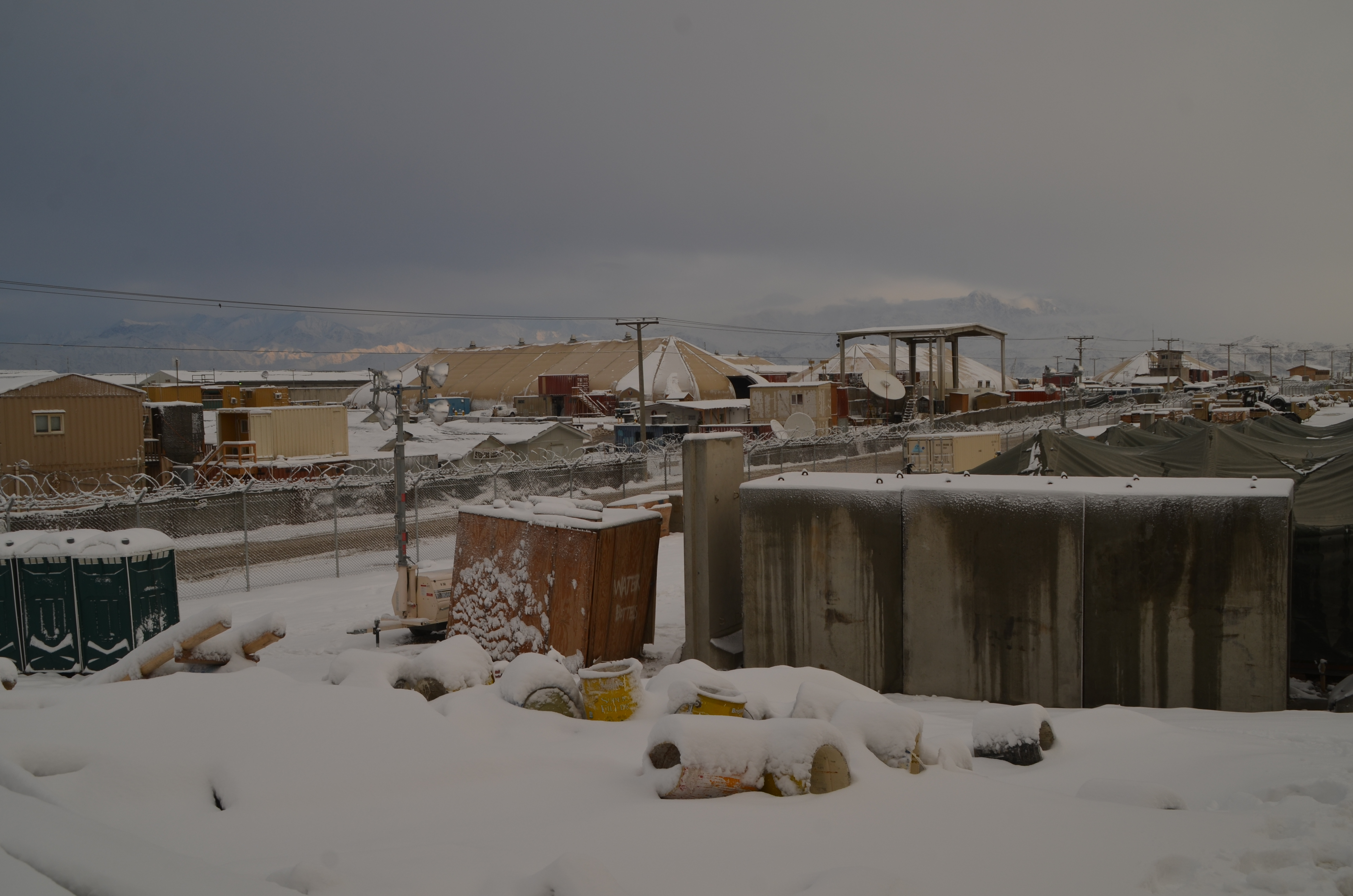
Bagram blanketed in snow, 28 December 2012.

According to the Köppen climate classification system, Bagram has a hot-summer humid continental climate (Dsa) with brief, but cold winters and long, hot and dry summers. Precipitation is most likely between the months of October and April. Dust storms and sand storms occur frequently during certain times of the year and the city is often blanketed by snow in winter months. The annual mean temperature is 12.0 °C (53.6 °F)

Climate data for Bagram
Month	Jan	Feb	Mar	Apr	May	Jun	Jul	Aug	Sep	Oct	Nov	Dec	Year
Mean daily maximum °C (°F)	3.5 (38.3)	4.1 (39.4)	11.1 (52.0)	18.2 (64.8)	24.6 (76.3)	29.6 (85.3)	32.6 (90.7)	31.8 (89.2)	27.6 (81.7)	21.0 (69.8)	12.9 (55.2)	7.2 (45.0)	18.7 (65.6)
Daily mean °C (°F)	−2.5 (27.5)	−1.3 (29.7)	4.8 (40.6)	11.3 (52.3)	17.4 (63.3)	22.3 (72.1)	25.5 (77.9)	24.7 (76.5)	20.7 (69.3)	14.4 (57.9)	6.3 (43.3)	0.8 (33.4)	12.0 (53.7)
Mean daily minimum °C (°F)	−8.5 (16.7)	−6.7 (19.9)	−1.5 (29.3)	4.4 (39.9)	10.1 (50.2)	15.0 (59.0)	18.3 (64.9)	17.6 (63.7)	13.7 (56.7)	7.7 (45.9)	−0.4 (31.3)	−5.6 (21.9)	5.3 (41.6)
Average precipitation mm (inches)	50 (2.0)	72 (2.8)	73 (2.9)	51 (2.0)	23 (0.9)	6 (0.2)	2 (0.1)	1 (0.0)	3 (0.1)	9 (0.4)	20 (0.8)	29 (1.1)	339 (13.3)
Source: Climate-Data.org

== See also ==
- Bagram District
- Parwan Province
