= Provincial Reconstruction Team Logar =

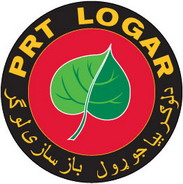
- Insignia of PRT Logar
- Active: 19 March 2008 - 2014
- Country: Czech Republic
- Branch: Land Forces
- Type: Light Motorised Task Force
- Role: Reconstruction/Area Security
- Size: as of February 2010: 298 total (286 soldiers and 12 civilians)

Provincial Reconstruction Team Logar (Czech: Provinční rekonstrukční tým Logar) was a Provincial Reconstruction Team that was part of the International Security Assistance Force - an international military force in Afghanistan. PRT Logar was subordinated to ISAF Regional Command East, responsible for the eastern provinces of Afghanistan. Regional Command East with its HQ in Bagram was a U.S.-run Operational Command containing units from several other NATO and non-NATO countries. The task of PRT Logar was to help the Afghan government rebuild and further develop Logar province.

The PRT combined civilian experts from the Czech Ministry of Foreign Affairs and the Czech Army military, whose role was to maintain a secure environment for reconstruction projects. The Czech PRT had proportionally one of the highest numbers of civilian experts in PRT. The members of the civilian team included construction engines, development specialists and experts in areas such as agriculture, security, media or veterinary medicine. These specialists cooperated with the provincial government, councils of elders (suras) and other representatives of local communities to extend their capacities and, through a broad range of joint projects, to have a positive impact on the province both in mid and long-term.

== History ==
PRT Logar was established on March 19, 2008, as a 26th Provincial Reconstruction Team deployed to Afghanistan. The PRT was located at U.S. Forward Operating Base Shank near capital of the Logar province, Pul-i-Alam. Area of responsibility was 3,800 km^{2}.

PRT Logar, as of July 2008, was composed of 192 troops and 7 civilians. Troops were mostly members of 102nd Reconnaissance Battalion (1st Contingent) with attachments from other units. In August 2008, 102nd Reconnaissance Battalion was replaced by troops of the 7th Mechanized Brigade (2nd Contingent). As of August 2008, PRT Logar was composed of 200 troops and 8 civilians. In March 2009 the troops of the 7th Mechanized Brigade were replaced by troops of the 4th Rapid Deployment Brigade (42nd Mechanized Battalion - 3rd Contingent, 41st Mechanized Battalion - 4th Contingent). As of March 2009, the number of troops was increased to 275 and the number of civilians to 10. As of February 2010, the 7th Mechanized Brigade (72nd Mechanized Battalion - 5th Contingent / 5th Unit) took over again and the number of personnel was further increased to 286 troops and 12 civilians. In August 2010, the 7th Mechanized Brigade (71st Mechanized Battalion - 6th Unit) was deployed and the number of personnel was set to 261 troops and 11 civilians. In February 2011, the 4th Rapid Deployment Brigade (43rd Airborne Battalion - 7th Unit) was deployed and the number of personnel was set to 293 troops and 11 civilians. In August 2011 they were relieved by 102nd Reconnaissance Battalion (8th Unit) and the number of personnel was set to 292 troops and 12 civilians.

== Principal Leaders ==
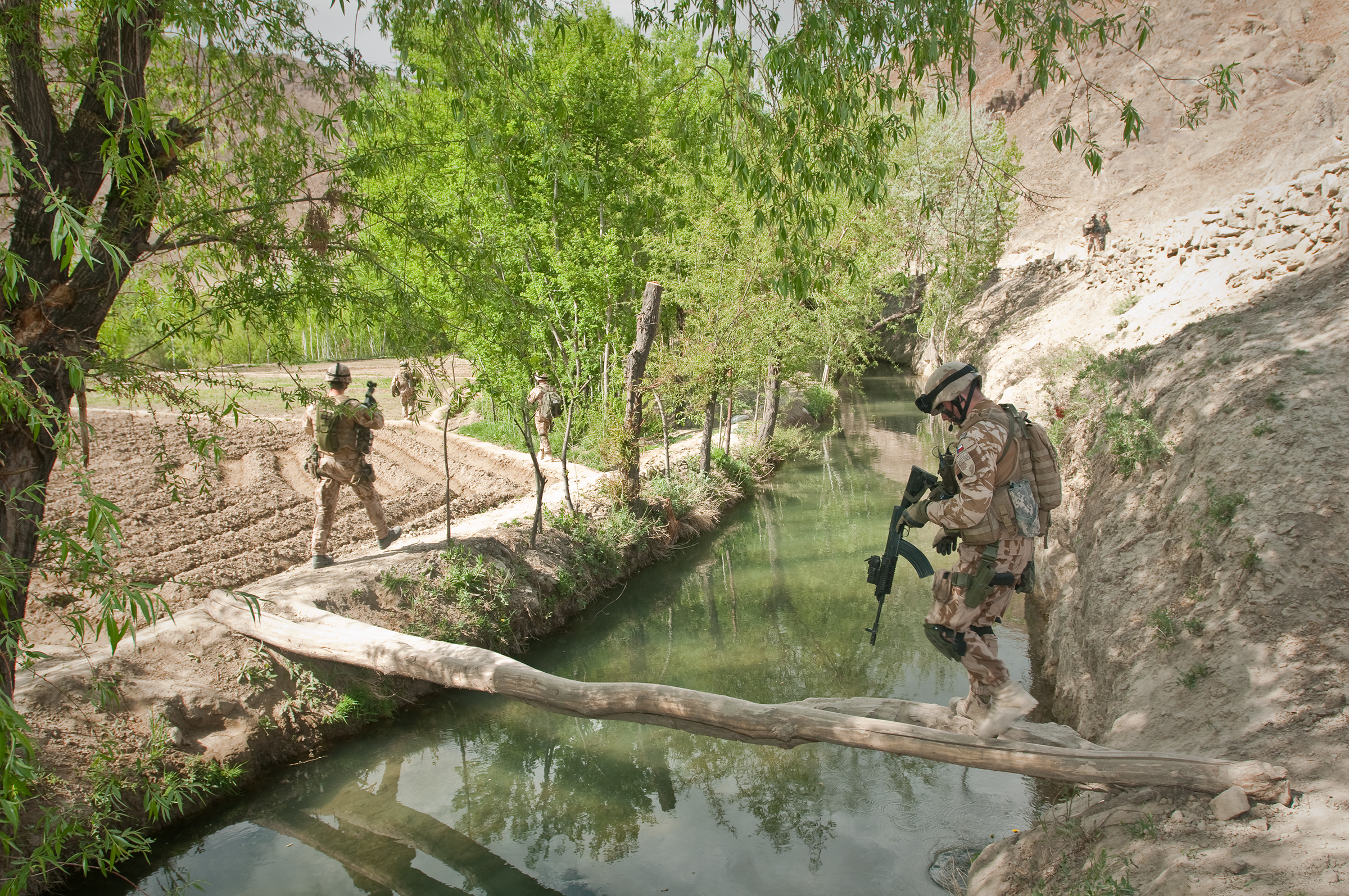
LOGAR PROVINCE, Afghanistan (April 9, 2010) —Czech soldiers assigned to Provincial Reconstruction Team Logar patrol a valley in Tang-e-Waghjan south of Forward Operating Base Shank. (U.S. Navy photo by Petty Officer 1st Class Mark O’Donald/Released)

=== Civilian Part ===
Year	Head of the civ. part of PRT	Deputy head of the civ. part of PRT
2008 – 2009	Václav Pecha	Igor Klimeš
2009 – 2010	Bohumila Ranglová	Jan Pejřil
2010 – 2011	Matyáš Zrno	Jarmila Jelínková
2011 – 2012	Petr Svačina	Marisa Perelló

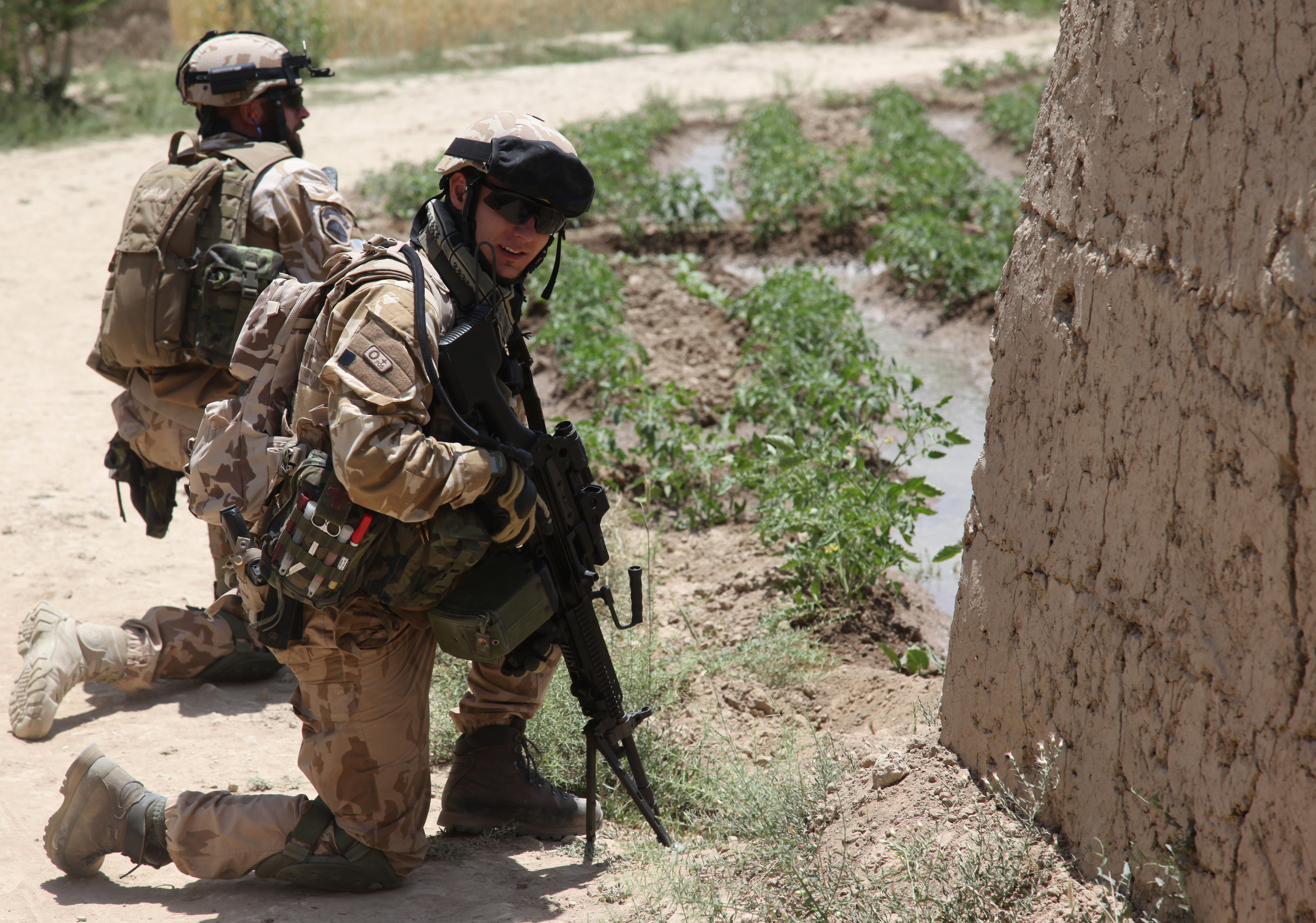
Czech Republic soldiers provide security in the village of Baraki Barak, Logar province, Afghanistan, during route clearance, in order to improve security in the area, July 06, 2011.

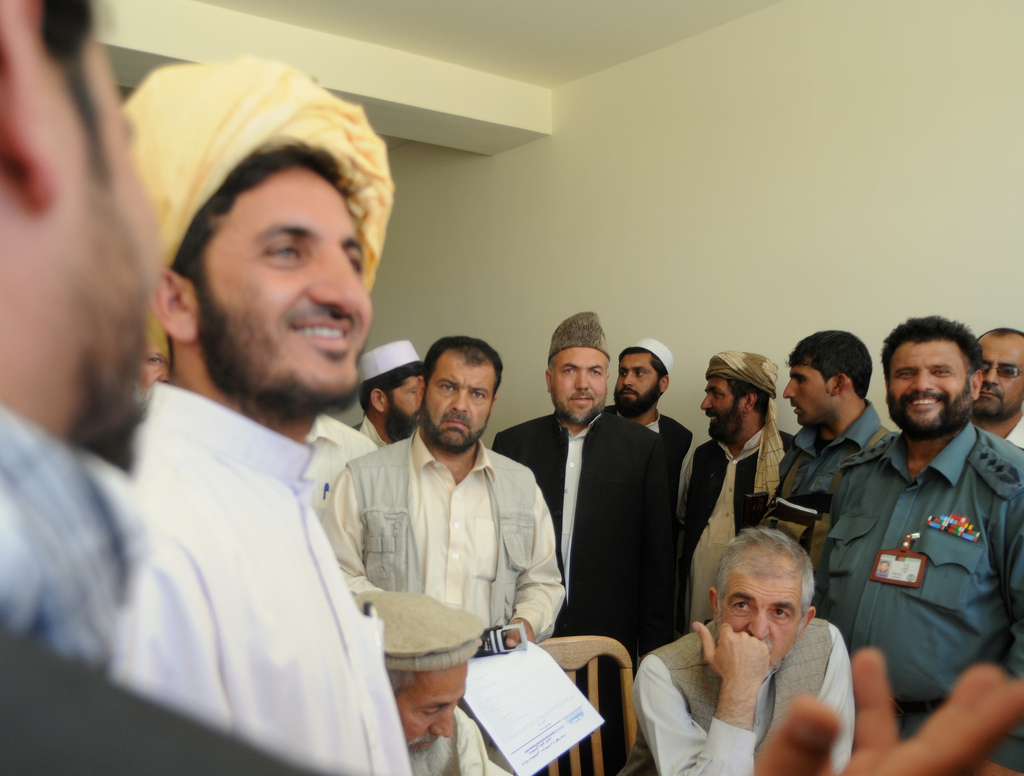
Government and court officials during a ceremony, August 14, 2011, celebrating a new law and justice library built with the help of the Czech Republic Logar Provincial Reconstruction Team, August 14, 2011.

=== Military Part ===
Contingent and Deployment	Commanding Officer	Command Sergeant Major
1st Contingent; March 2008 – August 2008	COL Ivo Střecha	CSM Daniel Indra
2nd Contingent; August 2008 – March 2009	LTC Pavel Lipka	CSM Martin Zaorálek
3rd Contingent; March 2009 – September 2009	LTC Petr Procházka	CSM Oto Holinka
4th Contingent; September 2009 – February 2010	COL Milan Schulc	CSM Jan Mudruňka
5th Contingent / 5th Unit; February 2010 – August 2010	COL Rudolf Honzák	CSM Vladimír Vrba
6th Unit; August 2010 – February 2011	LTC Ctirad Gazda	CSM Radim Kříž
7th Unit; February 2011 – August 2011	COL Miroslav Hlaváč	
8th Unit; August 2011 – February 2012	LTC Pavel Andráško	
9th Unit; February 2012 – August 2012	COL Antonín Genser	
10th Unit; August 2012 – February 2013	COL Josef Kopecký	
11th Unit - Pull-Out Detachment; January 2013 - July 2013	MAJ Vladimír Jelínek	

== Casualties ==
Since March 2008, one soldier of PRT Logar was killed and 17 were wounded by enemy action.

- April 30, 2008, at 1550, Private First Class (rotný in Czech; OR-3) Radim Vaculík, from the 102nd Reconnaissance Battalion, was killed in his M1151 Up-Armored HMMWV by Improvised Explosive Device (IED) composed of anti-tank mine. Four other soldiers were wounded (one of them seriously, two moderately and one lightly) in the same attack. PFC Radim Vaculík was posthumously promoted to Sergeant First Class (praporčík in Czech; OR-7).
- August 25, 2008 one soldier from the Military Police Special Operations Group was moderately injured when a wheel of his vehicle was damaged and the vehicle overturned.
- September 22, 2008, at 0200, two Privates First Class were moderately wounded and one Corporal (rotmistr in Czech; OR-4) was lightly wounded by an Indirect Fire (IDF) attack on FOB Shank.
- October 1, 2008, at 1220, seven soldiers from 7th Mechanized Brigade were wounded (one of them moderately and six lightly) in an ambush, while trying to recover an M1151 Up-Armored HMMWV that got stuck in the wadi. All were hit by shrapnel from the RPG-7.
- November 18, 2008, at 0955, three soldiers from 7th Mechanized Brigade, were lightly wounded in their M1151 Up-Armored HMMWV by Improvised Explosive Device (IED).
- April 17, 2009, shortly before 1400, three soldiers from 4th Rapid Deployment Brigade, were wounded (one of them seriously and two lightly) in their M1151 Up-Armored HMMWV by Improvised Explosive Device (IED).
- April 5, 2010, one soldier from 43rd Airborne Battalion, 4th Rapid Deployment Brigade, on a foot patrol, was lightly wounded in the upper arm by a hand grenade shrapnel.
- July 13, 2011, a Corporal from 43rd Airborne Battalion, 4th Rapid Deployment Brigade, on a foot patrol, was lightly wounded in the leg by enemy small arms fire.
- September 7, 2012, a Corporal at FOB Shank was heavily wounded by shrapnel from enemy indirect fire.

== Awards and decorations ==
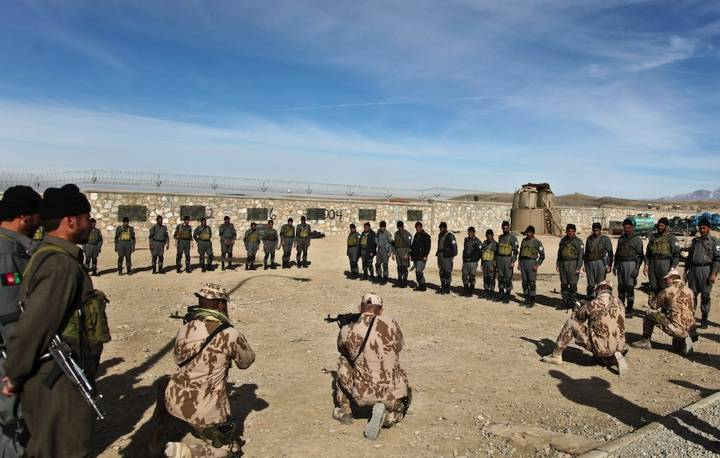
Czech soldiers demonstrate squad tactics to Afghan National Police

Czech soldiers who deploy to Afghanistan (for at least 30 consecutive days) receive Medal of the Minister of Defense for Service Abroad - Afghanistan. Also, Czech soldiers are eligible for NATO Non-Article 5 Medal after 30 either continuous or accumulated days on deployment in Afghanistan.

== See also ==
- Afghanistan War order of battle
- Counter-insurgency
- International Security Assistance Force (ISAF)
- Logical line of operation
- Military of Afghanistan
- Provincial Reconstruction Team
