= Provincial Reconstruction Team =

2002–2013 US military unit in unstable states

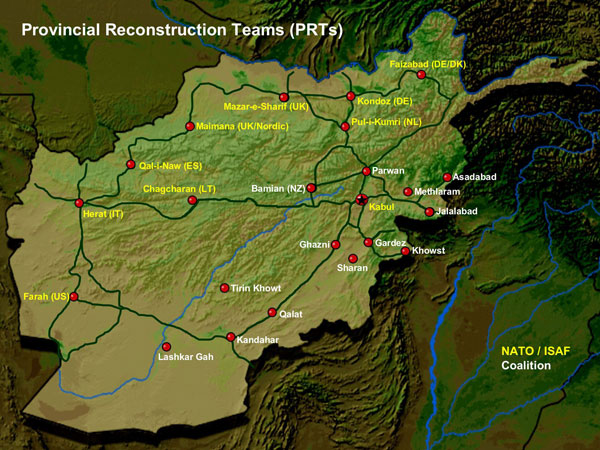
Distribution of Provincial Reconstruction Teams (PRTs) in Afghanistan (2005).

A Provincial Reconstruction Team (PRT) was a unit introduced by the United States government, consisting of military officers, diplomats, and reconstruction subject matter experts, working to support reconstruction efforts in unstable states. PRTs were first established in Afghanistan in early 2002, and were used in Iraq as well. While the concepts are similar, PRTs in Afghanistan and Iraq had separate compositions and missions. Their common purpose, however, was to empower local governments to govern their constituents more effectively.

== Structure ==
A PRT included a military component (Civil Affairs/Force Protection, etc.), civilian police advisors, and civilian representatives of US (or other national) government foreign affairs agencies. In a US-led PRT, this generally included a representative from USAID, the Department of State, the Department of Agriculture, and the Department of Justice. They were assisted by public diplomacy and reporting staff. The PRTs were the primary civil-military relations tool in Afghanistan and Iraq and have been described as "'a means to extend the reach and enhance the legitimacy of the central government'" into the provinces of Afghanistan.

A PRT in Afghanistan was commanded by a military officer, generally of the rank of Lieutenant Colonel (USAF) or Commander (USN). The officer was supported by a team of various specialties including civil affairs, engineers, medical staff, public affairs, information operations, logistics and a platoon of National Guard soldiers for security. The staff generally numbered between sixty and one hundred persons and trained together as a unit prior to deployment. There was no lead agency or department; the US government civilians and the military commander form an executive committee of equals which developed a strategy for the PRT, drawing on the expertise of all contributing agencies. By 2009, the military still dominated the role within PRTs as only three to four civilians were posted to each team of eighty to two hundred and fifty personnel. The lack of civilian personnel civilian executive agencies was a serious concern of CENTCOM commanders. Activities in Afghanistan focused on extending the reach of the central government into the provinces.

In an Iraq PRT, the Team Leader was a civilian who reports to the US Department of State; the deputy team leader was generally a military officer. While civil affairs members were present on the team, there were more civilians than military personnel on the team. Functional areas included rule of law, reconstruction and development, agriculture, and governance. Some Iraq PRTs were embedded into the Brigade Combat Team (BCT) with which they were colocated (ePRT). The BCT retained responsibility for providing security for the civilian team members. While PRTs in Afghanistan focused on short-term effects and ensuring an attractive alternative to the insurgency was available, Iraq PRTs focused on building the governance capacity at the local levels of government.

=== Public Diplomacy ===
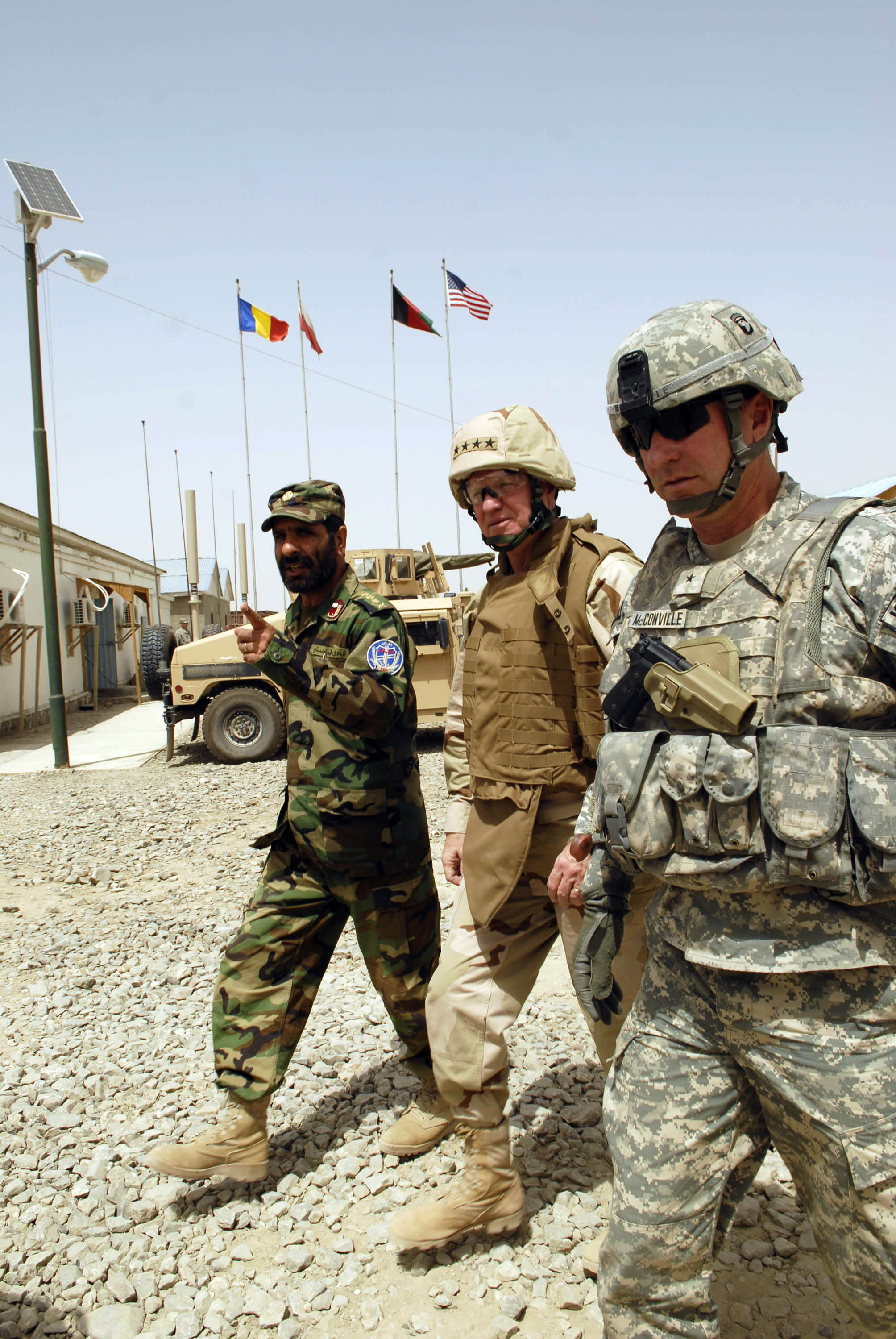
Chief of Naval Operations Adm. Gary Roughead (middle) tours FOB Rushmore in 2008 led by then-BG James C. McConville (right) and an Afghan soldier (left).

Public diplomacy was an essential element to successful Provincial Reconstruction Team projects. PRTs, in Afghanistan, were tasked with a specific area of a province and coordinate, develop, and fund local projects with the aid of the government. These projects enabled the local population to become familiar with and trust the U.S. counterinsurgency (COIN) efforts in Afghanistan. Projects supported by PRTs were created and approved by the ranks of the entire provincial government in Afghanistan. The ability of PRTS to conduct Public diplomacy and their ability to work with the provincial government made counterinsurgency objectives obtainable.

The PRT's civil affairs line of operation exerted a large amount of public diplomacy. CA operations were responsible, along with the provincial government, for implementation and supervision of projects in the province. These projects included public affairs like humanitarian supply distribution, like school and medical supplies. Civil affairs operations were responsible for reaching out to the population to determine what was deemed necessary to make society stable and secure from the insurgent ideology. To do this, military personnel had to familiarize themselves with the environment, including the people, places, and culture of their section of the province.

In addition to the military cooperation with the provincial government, civilian agencies like the U.S. Department of Agriculture and the U.S. Agency for International Development, had a strong hand in the projects structured by the PRTs. For example, these agencies worked together to improve farming techniques and introduce ways to bring goods to local markets to meet the increasing demand rather than taking them into Pakistan. PRTs' interaction with the Afghan people enhanced U.S. public relations and allow the civilians of Afghanistan to trust the American presence in their domain. It was speculated that the only way that the counterinsurgency in Afghanistan could achieve victory is through long-term patience and keeping the people's political will through the Provincial Reconstruction Teams in the U.S. military.

Information operations associated with PRTs were also a vital aspect to conducting public diplomacy in order to defeat insurgencies. These operations can include psychological operations, operational security, and military deception operations to deceive enemy combatants. Information operations assisted civil affairs, medical outreach, and agricultural projects by providing information to the local Afghans about counterinsurgency projects and illustrating beneficial effects of them to the community. These operations, as a part of PRTs, enabled the civilians to see how the U.S. military-civilian efforts work secure their society and defeat the insurgents influence. Information operations must be consistent between civilian and military operations.

The goal of the PRTs was to "enhance their popular legitimacy of the provincial government by developing their capacity to conduct reconstruction and provide effective governance." In order to support the counterinsurgency efforts PRTs built government legitimacy by reconstruction and development to separate the insurgents from the people and to instill trust in U.S. COIN operations.

== Funding ==
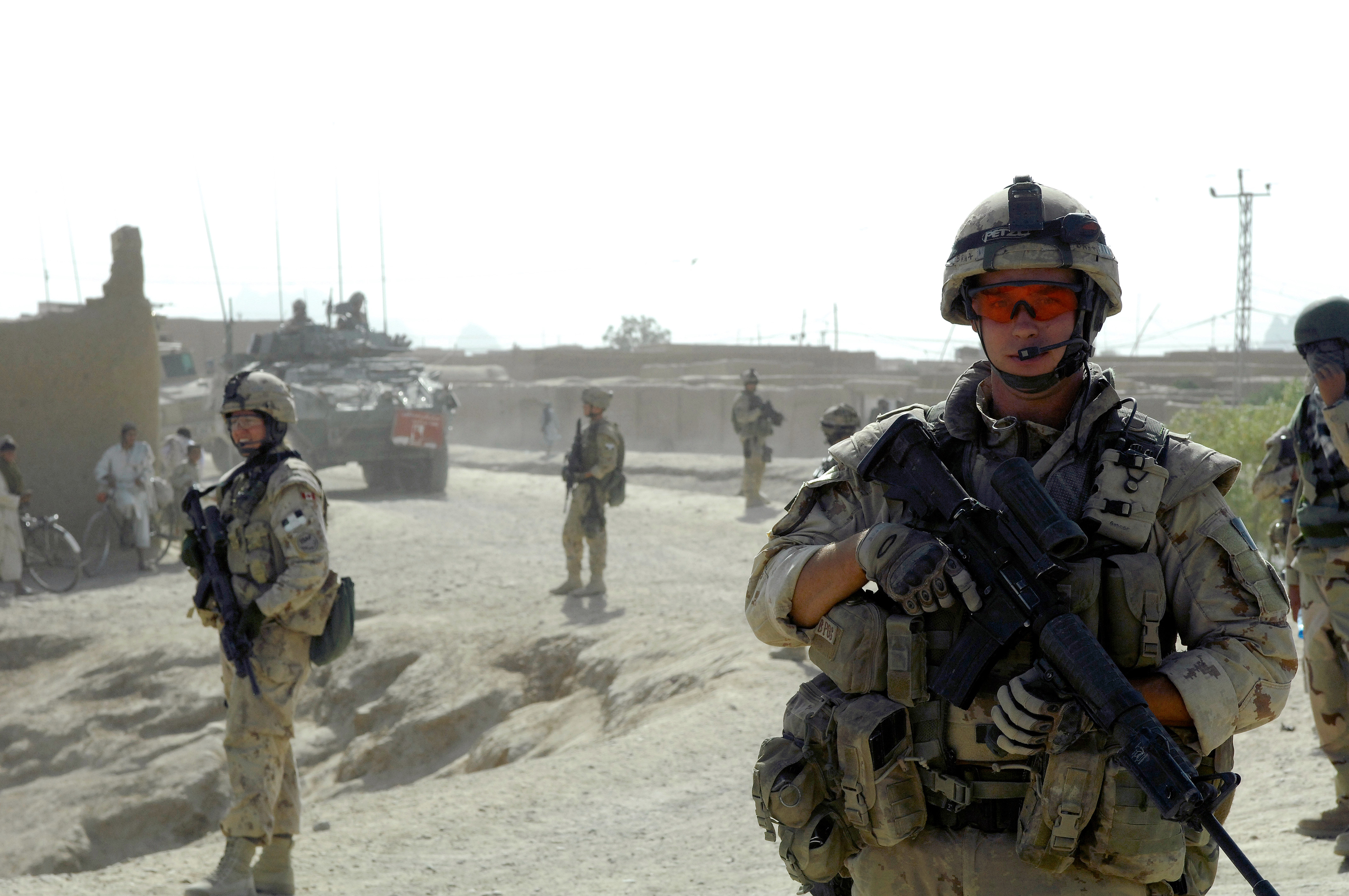
Canadian PRT patrolling in Kandahar Province

The main funding for Afghan PRTs came from Provincial Reconstruction and Development Committee (PRDC) and Quick Response Fund (QRF) programs under the International Security Assistance Force. Also, some funding came from USAID; namely under the Community Stabilization Program (CSP); the Local Governance Program (LGP); Community Action Program (CAP); Izdihar Economic Growth Program; and the INMA Agri-business Program.

Additional sources were: the Iraq Relief and Reconstruction Fund (IRRF), the Commander's Emergency Response Program (CERP) was the main fund used by the United States Army or USMC Civil Affairs Teams in both Iraq and Afghanistan. By the new regulations that came out in early 2009, the Iraqi Government has to pay half (50%) of projects above $750,000.

CERP Officers had authority to sign agreements with contractors up to $200,000. The Pay Agent disbursed cash or paid by electronic transfer (EFT) in Afghanistan. The PRT Commander (LTC or CDR) could approve projects up to $25,000. CERP guidelines required that development projects be coordinated through and sustained by local governments and prohibit the use of funding for the salaries of government officials. The monies could not be used by police or security forces. CERP projects from up to $200,000 had to be approved by the Task Force Commander. The contracts were written in US Engineering standards. The Army usually paid by electronic funds transfer as pay agents are discouraged from paying cash to contractors in Afghanistan. The projects were paid in phases. Engineers worked through project details with contractors. If the contractors failed the performance work standard, the engineer could recommend that the PRT withhold funds until project deficiencies were corrected. The project could also be cancelled.

One of the issues that held up a project was sustainability. If the project was not self-sustaining, such as an electric utility in a small village or town, it would not be approved by higher headquarters. Mandated 'Terms of Use' contracts were signed by the end user of the projects to insure PRTs were providing a self-sufficient resource and would not be responsible for its upkeep. One year guarantee on contractor workmanship was standard.

Other funds that were not used by the Civil Affairs Section: the Development Fund for Iraq. (DFI) and funding targeted specifically for USAID Focused Stabilization, Community Action and Local Governance Program (LGP) as well as PRT development funding.

== Concept and history ==
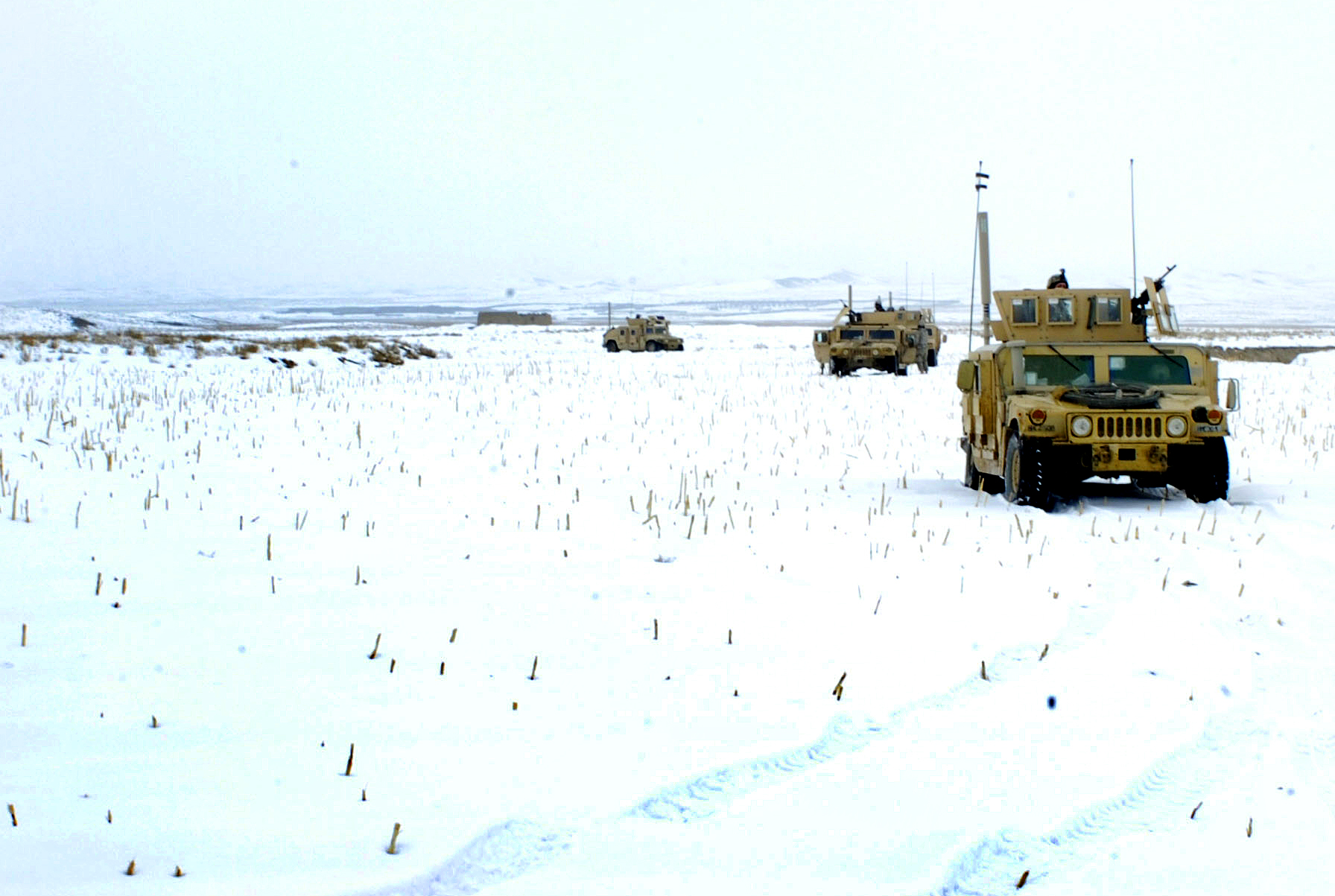
Coalition medics travelling to remote villages in Ghazni Province to provide medical care.

The overall PRT concept in Afghanistan was to use relatively small joint civil-military units to achieve three objectives. PRT objectives were to improve security, to extend the authority of the Afghan central government, and finally to facilitate reconstruction.

The first PRT was located in Gardez in Paktia Province, co-located with US Special Forces "A" team members. A Civil Affairs team provided the daily contact with locals and tribal leaders. A contingent of the 2nd Battalion, 504th Infantry Regiment, 82nd Airborne Division provided security in and around the compound. The sole civilian when the PRT became fully operational on February 1, 2003, was Thomas Praster of the State Department. At the end of March, he was joined by US Army Lieutenant Colonel Randolph Hampton, who worked under contract with the USAID providing overwatch to the rebuilding of schools and medical clinics throughout Paktia, Khost, and Ghazni Provinces.

Security was always an issue as the 100 by 125 foot mud-walled compound was attacked over 35 times by 105 mm rockets and RPGs. The PRT initiative expanded throughout most of the provinces for the purpose of reconstruction and reconciliation programs throughout Afghanistan. The 1st Provincial Reconstruction Team laid the critical cornerstones to future PRT initiatives throughout Afghanistan. PRTs were part of the NATO-led ISAF mission beginning on October 5, 2006 . The training for the majority of the American PRTs took place at Fort Bragg, North Carolina, and was later moved to Camp Atterbury, Indiana. The training was overseen by the 189th Infantry Brigade, which specialized in training PRTs. Other units, including the 158th Infantry Brigade, supported the 189th as it trained the PRTs in groups of twelve at a time. The training took anywhere from six weeks to three months.

After returning from an international conference in Munich in mid-February 2011, Afghan President Hamid Karzai accused foreign reconstruction teams of undermining efforts to build up the state's institutions, and said they would have to go as Afghan forces take over security. "Afghanistan clearly explained its viewpoint on Provincial Reconstruction Teams and structures parallel to the Afghan government - private security companies and all activities or bodies which are hindering the Afghan government's development and hindering the governance of Afghanistan," he said. Meanwhile, five rocket-propelled grenades hit a newly built South Korean military base in Parwan Province, northern Afghanistan, which housed hundreds of members of Korea's provincial reconstruction team and civilian aid workers. No one was injured in the attack, but it came hours after a visit by South Korean Defense Minister Kim Kwan-jin, raising suspicions of Taliban involvement. The opening ceremony of the base was postponed indefinitely.

== Afghan PRTs ==
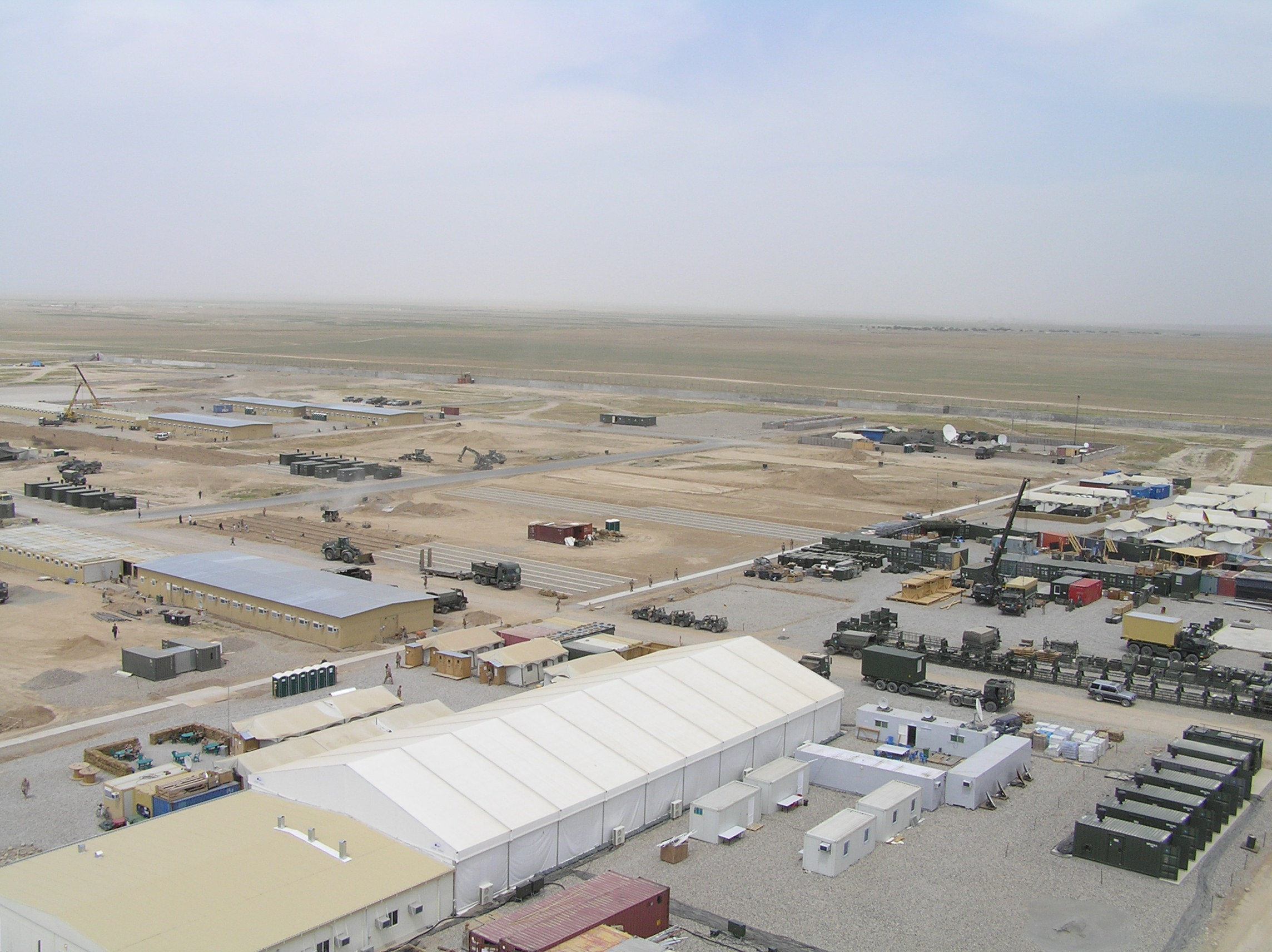
Camp Marmal, located in Balkh Province, under construction in 2006.

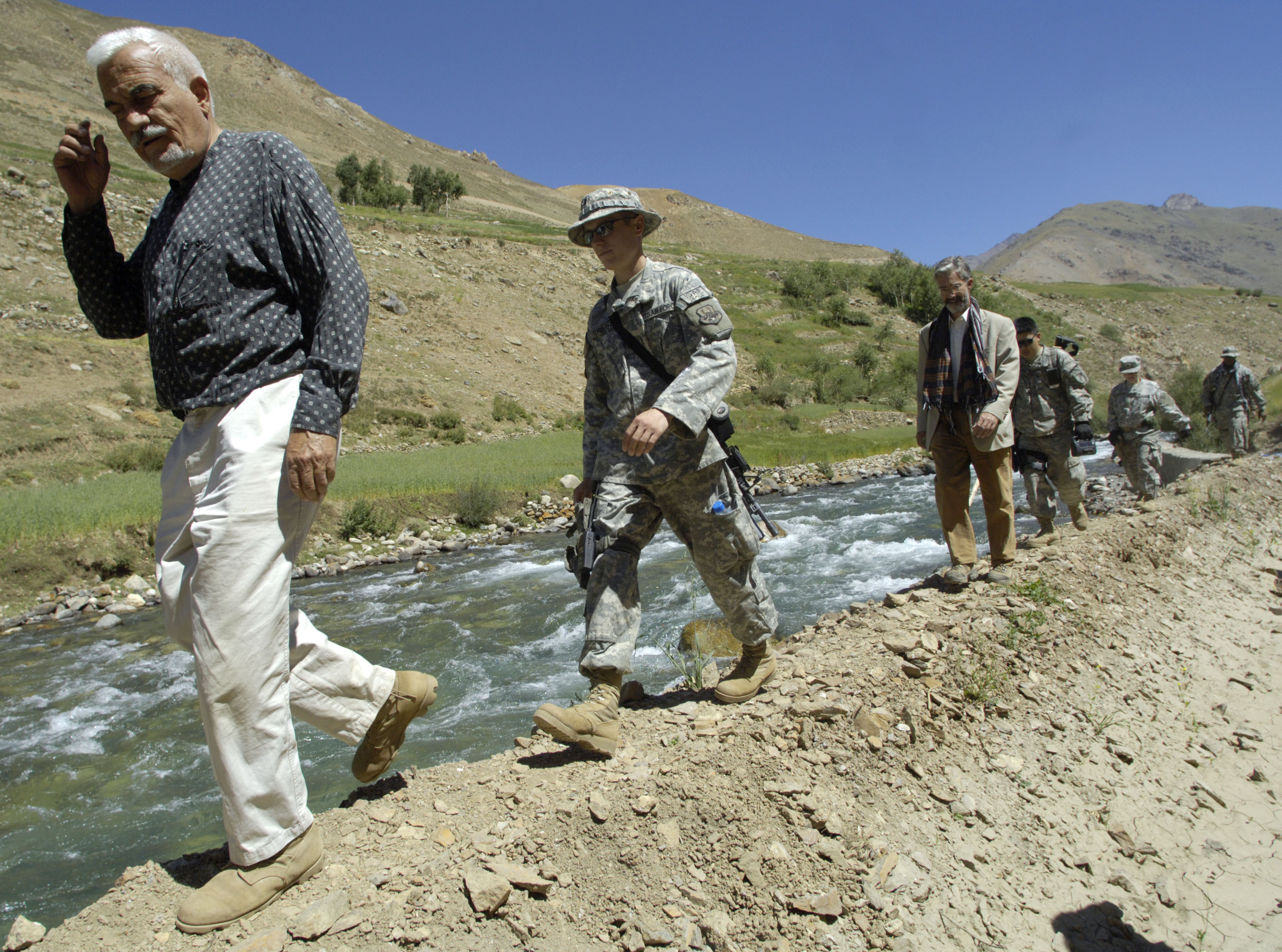
PRT members with Afghan elders in Panjshir Province conducting a micro hydro project

PRTs ceased operations by 2013 and are no longer operative in Afghanistan.

=== Regional Command North ===
- PRT Badakhshan (Germany)
- PRT Baghlan (Hungary)
- PRT Balkh (Sweden)
- PRT Faryab (Norway)
- PRT Kunduz (Germany)
- PRT Mazar-i-Sharif
- PRT Meymaneh

=== Regional Command East ===
- PRT Bamyan (New Zealand)
- PRT Ghazni (Poland, USA)
- PRT Khost (USA)
- PRT Kunar (USA)
- PRT Laghman (USA)
- PRT Logar (Czech Republic)
- PRT Nangarhar (USA)
- PRT Kapisa (USA)
- PRT Nurestan (USA)
- PRT Paktia (USA)
- PRT Paktika (Poland, South Korea, USA)
- PRT Panjshir (USA)
- PRT Parwan/Kapisa (USA)
- PRT Wardak (Turkey)

=== Regional Command South ===
- PRT Kandahar (Canada, USA)
- PRT Uruzgan (Australia, The Netherlands, USA)
- PRT Zabul (Romania, USA)

=== Regional Command Southwest ===
- PRT Helmand (UK, USA)
- PRT LashKar Gah (Denmark, Estonia, UK, USA)

=== Regional Command West ===
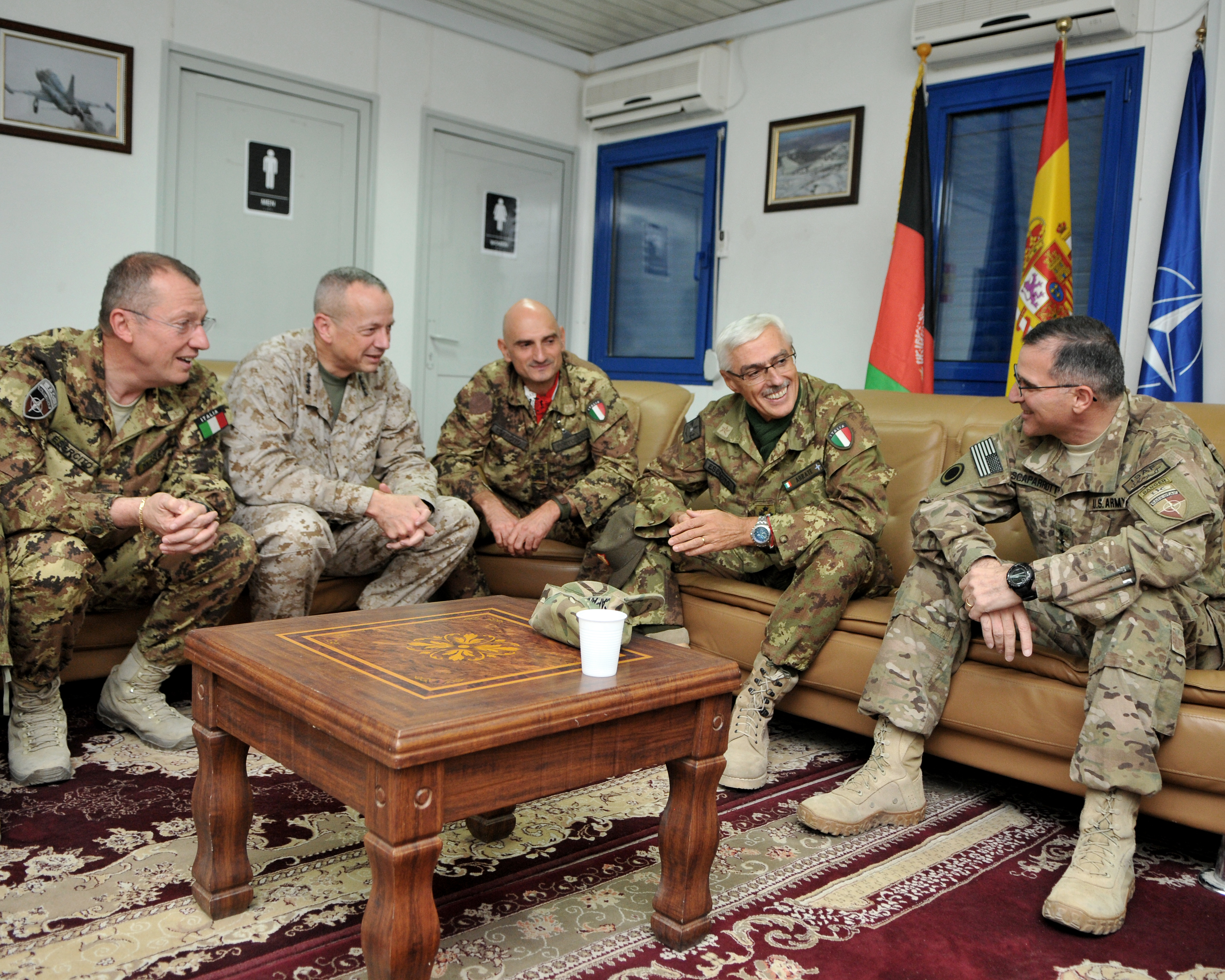
Meeting of Italian and U.S. commanders at Regional Command West HQ in Herat.

- PRT Badghis (Spain)
- PRT Farah (USA)
- PRT Gower (Lithuania)
- PRT Herat (Italy)

== Iraq PRTs ==
The PRT concept was imported from Afghanistan into Iraq in 2005. That year, 10 PRTs were established in Nineveh, at-Ta'Mim, Saladin, Diyala, Basra (UK), Dhi Qar (Italy), Erbil (South Korea), Baghdad, Anbar, and Babil. As part of the Iraq War troop surge of 2007, the number of PRTs was expanded to cover every province in the country. Additionally, ePRTs were rolled out to work with the sub-provincial levels of government. By 2008, there were 31 PRTs, including 13 ePRTs, located throughout Iraq. Beginning in 2008, a PRT including USDA agricultural advisers worked with Iraqi farmers and created the Green Mada'in Association for Agricultural Development, an agricultural cooperative of 800 farmers in Mada'in Qada. The book, We Meant Well: How I Helped Lose the Battle for Iraqi Hearts and Minds, by former PRT Team Leader Peter Van Buren, covers the Green Mada'in and other reconstruction projects in Iraq. PRTs are no longer operative in Iraq.

== Relationship with NGOs ==
Many NGOs were critical of PRT activity, claiming that the mixture of humanitarian and military operations had "blurred the line" between combatant and civilian. Organizations such as Save the Children, CARE International, and InterAction have all complained that PRTs put aid workers at risk. However, evidence of such a relationship has largely been anecdotal. Empirical studies on aid worker insecurity in Afghanistan have failed to show a statistically significant relationship between attacks on NGOs and their proximity to the military in general and PRTs specifically. Watts (2004) did not find evidence indicating heightened aid worker insecurity in provinces where the US military was present. Similarly, Mitchell (2015) was unable to discover a relationship between attacks against NGOs and their proximity to US-led PRTs.

In addition, Refugees International made the observation that the cost of PRTs undertaking small-scale reconstruction projects was far higher than the same projects could be accomplished by NGOs and development agencies and recommended that PRTs focus on maintaining security rather than acting as aid agencies.

== See also ==
- Afghanistan War order of battle
- Counter-insurgency
- Logical line of operation
- Military of Afghanistan
- Task Force Uruzgan
