= Green Mada'in Association for Agricultural Development =

The Green Mada'in Association for Agricultural Development (GMAAD; Arabic: مؤسسه مدائن الخضراء للتنمية الزراعية, romanized: Muʼassasah Madāʼin al-Khaḍrāʼ lil-Tanmiyah al-Zirāʻīyah) is a not-for-profit agricultural cooperative in Iraq. The cooperative's membership includes over 800 small farmers, mostly situated in Mada’in Qada, a region east of Baghdad in Baghdad Governorate.

GMAAD assists farmers in buying fertilizer and seeds in addition to hiring drivers and renting equipment to harvest wheat and barley. Cooperative members may make arrangements to sell their products directly to the public in Baghdad. Farmers who receive training and greenhouses agree to return a portion of their profits to the agriculture associations in order to fund the construction of greenhouses for other members. The cooperative opened warehouse facilities and a new office and held the first meeting of its board of directors in December 2009.

Efforts to form the cooperative began in 2008 with the support of 47 Mada'in Qada agricultural associations, Iraqi Prime Minister Nouri al-Maliki, and the Iraq Ministry of Agriculture. The cooperative was founded with the help of the USDA's Provincial Reconstruction Team (PRT) to rebuild Iraq's agricultural sector. USDA agricultural advisors Floyd Wood, Glen Brown and John Ellerman provided technical expertise and guidance during the formation of the cooperative. Initial funding of $6 million was provided by the United States Department of State. Two-thirds of the funding was used to provide farmers with access to credit through a Revolving Loan Fund. An additional $4.5 million was provided by the U.S. Commanders' Emergency Response Program to install over 400 greenhouses and nearly 600 drip irrigation systems. Green Mada'in Association for Agricultural Development is the largest U.S. funded agricultural project in Iraq.

Future projects of the cooperative may include construction of a date-processing plant, cattle chutes and a poultry feed mill.

== Literature ==
A new book, We Meant Well: How I Helped Lose the Battle for Iraqi Hearts and Minds, by former PRT Team Leader Peter Van Buren, covers the Green Mada'in and updates the referenced reconstruction projects in Iraq.
