= Peter van Buren =

American diplomat (born 1960)

- Born: 1960 (age 65–66); New York City, New York
- Occupation: Author

Peter van Buren (born 1960) is a retired United States Foreign Service employee, and the author of two novels and two non-fiction books about military affairs.

== Early life ==
Peter van Buren was born in New York City.

== Career ==
Van Buren served in the U.S. Department of State for 24 years, including a year in Iraq as a team leader for two Provincial Reconstruction Teams (PRTs).

After his book, We Meant Well: How I Helped Lose the Battle for the Hearts and Minds of the Iraqi People, was published in 2012 Van Buren claims to have experienced a series of escalating, adverse actions. According to his former employer, the U. S. State Department, van Buren had not properly cleared his book for publication under Department rules, and the book contained unauthorized disclosures of classified material. The Washington Post noted that "Van Buren has tested the First Amendment almost daily." The Government Accountability Project and the ACLU helped defend van Buren, and the State Department eventually allowed him to retire with his standard pension and benefits.

Van Buren was associate producer for the film Silenced (2014) by James Spione.

In August 2018, Twitter banned Van Buren for life for writing that "harasses, intimidates, or uses fear to silence someone else's voice." Van Buren disputed this, and later wrote, "My specific offense [for which I was banned] was to criticize journalists for carrying the government’s propaganda leading into the Iraq War," and as of 2025 he was "reinstated to what is now X by Elon Musk after I wrote an open letter to him"

== Bibliography ==
- Hooper's War: A Novel of WWII Japan. Luminis Books. May 15, 2017. ISBN 978-1941311127.
- Ghosts of Tom Joad: A Story of the #99 Percent. Luminis Books. April 25, 2014. ISBN 978-1935462910.
- We Meant Well. Metropolitan Books. September 27, 2011. ISBN 9780805094367.
- Why Peace (as a contributor). Marc Guttman. April 23, 2012. ASIN B007WTUR6E.
