= Counter-insurgency operations during the Second Chechen War =

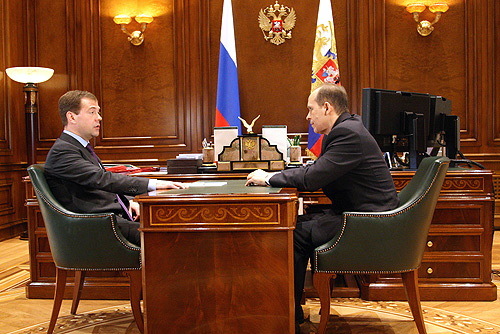
Dmitry Medvedev meets with Alexander Bortnikov on 27 March 2009 to discuss the ending of counter-terrorism operations in Chechnya.

Counter-insurgency operations during the Second Chechen War have been conducted by the Russian army in Chechnya since 1999. The President of Chechnya, and former rebel, Ramzan Kadyrov declared this phase to end in March 2009. On 27 March 2009, the President of Russia Dmitry Medvedev met with Alexander Bortnikov, the Director of the Federal Security Service to discuss the official ending of counter-terrorism operations in Chechnya. Medvedev directed the National Anti-Terrorism Committee, which Bortnikov also heads, to report to the Russian government on this issue, which will then by decided by the Russian parliament. As of early 2009 there were close to 480 active insurgents situated in the mountains under leadership of field commander Doku Umarov, according to official data.

Clashes with insurgents also continued in other regions of North Caucasus in 2009.
