= Logical line of operation =

A logical line of operation (LLO) is an obsolete American military doctrinal concept. It was originally used along with the separate term line of operation which described a geographic line from a base of operations to a military objective. The qualifier "logical" indicated the pursuit of military objectives that did not necessarily require a physical or geographic description, such as governance capacity-building and development activities.

In 2011, the US Army's Field Manual 3-0: Operations rescinded the term in favor of the term line of effort. As there is no joint doctrinal equivalent in the US military, the term has become obsolete in US military vernacular. The terms still exists in various US doctrinal references that have not been updated since 2011.

== Usage ==
In the traditional sense, a line of operations is "an imaginary line between the force's base of operations and the objective". In contrast, a logical line of operations is one in which "positional reference to enemy forces has little relevance". In essence, an LLO was a strategy or a series of steps to address a problem, either military or non-military, within the context of counterinsurgency operations, stability operations, or other operations not focused on major combat operations. Such problems included traditional military objectives such as providing security or training host-nation security forces, or unconventional tasks such as providing social services, economic development, or governance capacity-building.

== Rescinded in US military doctrine ==
The term "logical line of operation" was rescinded in US Army doctrine by FM 3-0: Operations. It was replaced by the term Line of Effort. The change makes lines of operation, which are now strictly geographic designations, distinct from the conceptual line of effort, which "links multiple tasks and missions using the logic of purpose—cause and effect—to focus efforts toward establishing operational and strategic conditions."

== Current uses ==
The current U.S. counter-insurgency field manual identifies five different LLOs.

- Combat Operations/Civil Security Operations
- Host Nation Security Forces
- Essential Services
- Governance
- Economic Development

Depending on their appropriateness to the situation, all five should be pursued simultaneously in order to weaken the root causes of insurgency. As many of these tasks exceed the traditional scope of the U.S. military, this concept is tied to the use of Provincial Reconstruction Teams (civilian reconstruction experts embedded with combat troops).
